= Gardula Zone =

Zone in the South Ethiopia Regional State

Coordinates: 5°40′N 37°20′E

Map of the regions and zones of Ethiopia

Gardula Zone is one of the zones in the South Ethiopia Regional State of Ethiopia. In 2011, the zone was demarcated in the former Segen Area Peoples Zone which was established by Derashe and other three former special woredas surrounding it. It received zonal status when the South Ethiopia Regional State formed in August 2023. The region is an important agricultural area, known for its farming of cereal crops and cash crops like Khat. It is also a significant paleoanthropological research area, and is the birthplace of the Moringa plant (locally referred to as ''Hallako": ሀለኮ in Amharic). It is known for Filla Festival, an annual cultural festival held in mid-January.

== Overview ==
The term "Gardula" originally described a mountain and the surrounding area west of the present day Gidole town. It also represented a wider administrative territory that included the Konso, Gawwada, and other communities. Initially the territory was chosen as strategic site by fitawrari Habtà Giyorgis, Emperor Ménilék II's War Minister and named it "Gaara Duula" (ጋራ ዱላ) in Afaan Oromoo which literally translates as "War Mountain". Geographically, the zone is bordered on the south by Konso Zone, on the west by Ale zone (part of Gardula itself before 2011), on the north by the Gamo Zone, on the northeast by Lake Chamo, and on the east by Amaro and Burji territorial and administrative zones. The administrative center of Gardula Zone is called Gidole, which is 175 kilometers away from the administrative capital of South Ethiopia, Wolaita Sodo and 54 kilometers from Arba Minch town.

Gardula Zone is a multiethnic, multilingual and multi-religious zonal administrative unit. It incorporates four indigenous ethnic groups: D’irasha, Mossiye, Kussume and Masholle. The D’irasha ethnic group is the majority, in terms of both population size and geographic coverage. In addition to the four indigenous ethnic groups, there are the Amhara, Gurage, Gamo, Wolayta, Oromo, Alle, Konso, Kore, Zeyese and others.

== History ==
Gardula historically referred to a mountainous area near the present day Gidole town, but was also used for an administrative division including various peoples, encompassing areas like the Konso and Borena. According to Gabrã Íéllase's map of 1930 (GueCopMen), Gardula was an administrative centre of the Borâna region, then a large territory governed by fitawrari Habtà Giyorgis, Emperor Ménilék II's War Minister. Borâna territory as shown on the map comprised the people and territories of Gamo, Soddo, Gurage, part of Wolayita, Baco, Boreda, Gedeo, Konso and Borâna. A travel account by Harrison (1901:269) testifies to the use of Gardula as the name of an administrative centre: “At Gardula we camped in the middle of terraced gardens, all the hillside being leveled up by thousands of low stone walls: none of the plots are more than 2 m wide, and yet hundreds of miles are treated in this manner. Here we were courteously entertained by fitawrari Wäldo, who now represents the last Abyssinian outpost; owing to the fearful drought, the more advanced posts at Hamär Koki and on the Omo have all been forced to retire. This officer has 1500 soldiers under his command, who spend all their time killing elephants for the emperor; he told us they alone have sent 1500 tusks to Addis in the last two months, which possibly accounts for the few we found.” Hodson, the British Consul who lived in Gardula, also used the name in the sense of a garrison town: “…I wished to call upon Fitaurari Waldi, the Governor of Boran, whose headquarters were at Gardula” (Hodson 1970:33). Immediately after the withdrawal of the Italians and until 1991, the area remained one of the administrative and political units.

Later, it was renamed from Gardula to Derashe due to the D'irasha being the majority ethnic group (Tefera, 2015). Gardula had become one of the administrative structures of Ethiopia, specifically within the SNNPR, which was dissolved in 2023.

== Demographics ==
Based on the 2007 Census conducted by the Central Statistical Agency of Ethiopia (CSA), this zone has a total population of 142,758, of whom 70,111 are men and 72,647 are women. With an area of 1,487.38 square kilometers, Dirashe has a population density of 95.98; 13,184 or 9.24% are urban inhabitants. A total of 26,838 households were counted in this zone, which results in an average of 5.32 persons to a household, and 26,102 housing units. The eight largest ethnic groups reported in this woreda were the Dirashe (45.01%), the Gawwada (27.94%), the Mossiya (9.27%), the Kusumie (5.08%), the Mashole (4.34%), the Konso (2.35%), the Gamo (1.76%), and the Amhara (1.62%); all other ethnic groups made up 2.63% of the population. Dirashe was spoken as a first language by 47.51% of the inhabitants, 27.43% spoke Gawwada, 9.09% spoke Bussa, 4.82% spoke Oromiffa, 4.1% spoke Amharic, 3.66% spoke Gamo, and 1.76% spoke Konso; the remaining 1.63% spoke all other primary languages reported. 50.03% were Protestants, 34.27% practiced Ethiopian Orthodox Christianity, and 12.84% of the population said they practiced traditional religions.

In the 1994 Census, Dirashe had a population of 89,900 in 17,181 households, of whom 45,617 were men and 49,038 were women; 8,167 or 9.08% of its population were urban dwellers. The five largest ethnic groups reported in this woreda were the Dirashe (58.44%), the Gawwada (19.75%), the Mossiya (10.06%), the Amhara (2.99%), and the Konso (2.34%); all other ethnic groups made up 6.48% of the population. Dirashe was spoken as a first language by 55.08% of the inhabitants, 19.64% spoke Gawwada, 7.26% spoke Bussa, 5.41% spoke Oromiffa, and 4.97% spoke Amharic; the remaining 7.64% spoke all other primary languages reported. 51.63% of the population said they practiced traditional religions, 35.46% were Protestants, and 10.38% practiced Ethiopian Orthodox Christianity. Concerning education, 17.49% of the population were considered literate; 9.69% of children aged 7–12 were in primary school; 3.2% of the children aged 13–14 were in junior secondary school, and 3.48% of the inhabitants aged 15–18 were in senior secondary school. Concerning sanitary conditions, about 74% of the urban houses and 19% of all houses had access to safe drinking water at the time of the census; 64% of the urban and 12% of the total had toilet facilities.
