= Munyo language =

Variety of the Oromo language spoken in Kenya

Munyo
- Region: Northeast Tana River County
- Ethnicity: Munyoyaya
- Language family: Afro-Asiatic: Cushitic; Lowland East; Oromoid; Oromo; Southern Oromo?; Orma; Munyo

Language codes
- ISO 639-3: orc
- Glottolog: muny1242

Munyo (Korokoro, Munyo Yaya, Munyoyaya; autonym: afaan munyoti) is a variety of the Oromo language spoken by the Munyoyaya of northeast Tana River County in Kenya. It is similar to the neighbouring Orma language and is regarded as a dialect of Orma by Ethnologue.
