= Dullay languages =

Cushitic language family of Ethiopia

Dullay
- Geographic distribution: Southern Nations, Nationalities, and Peoples' Region, Ethiopia
- Linguistic classification: Afro-Asiatic: Cushitic; East; Dullay
- Subdivisions: Dihina; Dobase; Gaba; Gawwada; Gergere; Gollango; Gorrose; Harso; Tsamai

Language codes
- Glottolog: dull1239

The Dullay languages belong to the Cushitic subgroup of the Afro-Asiatic language family and are spoken in Ethiopia, mainly in the watershed of the Weito River.

== Name ==
The name Dullay is derived from the name Dullay-speaking groups use for the Weito River. Two other general terms have been used for this language group in scholarly literature. Werizoid was introduced by Bender (1971) from the official Amharic administrativ denominations for the area at that time. Qawko by Hayward (1978) was taken from the word "man" in Dullay languages. None of those names bears any meaning to the speakers. The denomination of "Ale" (from /ʕale/, meaning 'upland') is a rather young denomination used in English publications and used by the today's administration of Ethiopia, and refers only to the highland varieties to the exclusion of Ts'amakko.

== Varieties ==
Dullay is a dialect continuum, by current convention divided primarily in the Ale varieties in the uplands around the mountains Gardulla and Dobase, and the relatively divergent Tsamai (Ts'amakko) in the lowlands west of Weito River. The former area is divided in a large number of further dialects. The following are listed by Amborn, Minker & Sasse:

- Dihina and Gaba: Northwest along the banks and tributaries of the Weito, poorly known.
- Dobase or Gobase, Gowaze: Above 2000m around the peak of mt. Dobase. Includes the sub-dialects of Lohu and Upper Masholle. (Lower Mashile is a more distantly related language of the Konsoid group of East Cushitic.)
- Harso: The northernmost variety, close to Dobase.
- Gawwada: South of the town of Gawwada along the east bank of river Dalbena, west of the Turo. A reported variety Gawwada of Dalbena may represent Gorrose or a transitional variety towards it.
- Gollango: Around the town of Kolango, north of Gawwada and south of Dobase.
- Gorrose: Transitional between Gollango and Dobase, east of the former.
- Gergere: Southwest along the banks of the Weito.

The best-described varieties are Gawwada, Gollango, Harso, Dobase and Ts'amakko.

Amborn, Minker & Sasse suggest a primary division in three main dialects:

- Northern Harso–Dobase
- Southeastern Gawwada–Gollango
- Western Tsamay–Gaba

Yoshino suggests for the first two the terms "Highland ʻAlle" and "Lowland ʻAlle".

=== Isoglosses ===
The chief phonological differences between the varieties concern the system of stop consonants:

Proto-Dullay	Tsamay	Gawwada, Gollango	Harso, Dobase
*b *d *z *g	b d z g	p t s k	p t s k
*t	t	t	tʃ
*k	k	x	h
*čʼ	tʃʼ	kʼ	tʃʼ
*kʼ	qʼ	q	kʼ, ɢ

Most of these isoglosses in the Ale area are areally shared with the neighboring dialect cluster of Konsoid languages to the east. All of also have devoicing of Proto-East Cushitic *b *d *g, while its northern varieties such as Dirayta and Mossiya shift *t to /tʃ/ and *k to /h/, southern varieties such as Konso shift *k to /x/ in some positions and *kʼ to uvular /ʛ/.
