= Waata language =

Dialect of Southern Oromo spoken in Kenya

Waata
- Sanye
- Native to: Kenya
- Region: Lamu District, Tana River
- Ethnicity: Waata
- Native speakers: 20,000 (2019 census)
- Language family: Afro-Asiatic: Cushitic; Lowland East; Oromoid; Oromo; Southern Oromo?; Waata
- Writing system: Latin (limited use)

Language codes
- ISO 639-3: ssn
- Glottolog: waat1238
- ELP: Sanye

The Waata language is a dialect of Orma or otherwise Southern Oromo spoken by the Waata people of Kenya.

On 5 July 2025, after a thirteen year translation project, the New Testament of the Bible was published in Waata. The translation was overseen by Wycliffe Bible Translators and Bible Translation and Literacy. The launch of the New Testament took place at the Mapimo Vocational Training Center in Gongonie, Kilifi County. Work has begun on the Old Testament in the Waata language.

The Jesus Film was launched in 2018 of the language.
