= Orma (clan) =

Oromo clan in the Horn of Africa

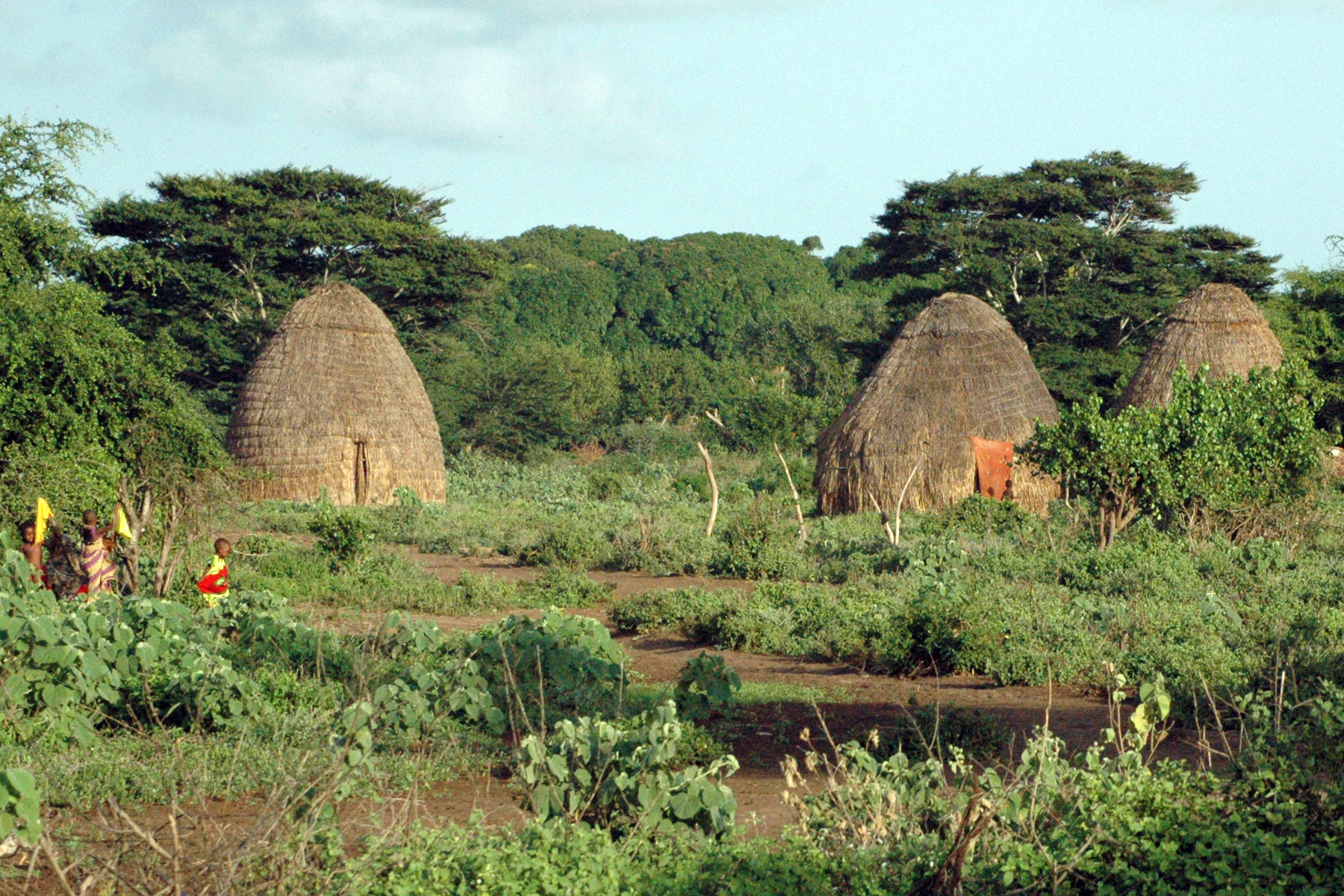
Orma village in Tana River County, Kenya

The Orma is one of the greater Oromo clans in the Horn of Africa, who predominantly live in Tana River County in coastal Kenya and in southern Ethiopia. They share a common language and cultural heritage with other Oromo clans. There main town is Hola, Garsen, Bura and Witu. They are pastoralists and almost all are Muslims. In 2019 the Orma numbered 158,993.

== Terminology ==
The literature on the Orma, Oromo, Warra Daya, Wardai, Waridei, and Wardeh) shows that the terminology is extremely confusing. Therefore, there are a few comments concerning the terminology. In the oldest literature, the Cushitic speaking people who nowadays are identified as the Orma and Oromo speaking people were called Warra Daya. This name was used by the Somali for the Oromo or Southern Galla living in Jubaland. In white colonial literature, these people were called the Galla. The Oromo never called themselves Galla as they considered the name offensive. In the middle of the twentieth century, following the principle that the name a people use for themselves is to be taken in for official and scientific use, the name Galla was slowly replaced by Oromo. There exist no agreed-upon etymology for this name and both Orma and Oromo are used, although the spelling Oromo is preferred since the second half of the twentieth century. For the group of people discussed here the name Orma is used as this is their self-chosen name. The name Orma forms enough contrast to other tribes in the area, but if we want to distinguish them from other Orma and Oromo and want to prevent confusion, we should specify them as the Tana Orma.

The Somali still call the Tana Orma Wardey or Warra-Daya. However, the Tana Orma restrict the name Wardey to back-migrants who had lived as serfs under the Somali and who were descendants of Orma captives.

== History ==
=== Overview ===
The Warra Daya were first mentioned in an Arabic source in the 15th century. According to Trenton, they invaded and migrated into the Juba area in the 16th century, where prior to their invasion, the Garre, Ajuuraan, Tunni, and other Somalis lived. In the early 19th century, they were at the height of their power when they inhabited almost all of the Westbank of Jubba River to their east bordering the powerful Geledi Sultanate. West Jubaland (roughly Northern and Eastern Kenya and South Western Somalia). In the 19th century the Darod Somali, particularly Ogaden, advanced southwards across the Dawa River. The first attempt in 1842 failed, but in 1844 they tried again and were allowed to enter as clients (shegats). The usual method of Darod penetration into a new area was to adopt a client relationship with the people already there. In practice, this meant that they became herdsboys who were allowed to keep some animals of their own. Then these clients slowly consolidated their numbers until they had achieved parity with or even superiority over the original inhabitants. Around 1865, when smallpox epidemiology weakened the Warra Daya, they were attacked by Darod from the North and to a lesser extent by the Kamba from the West and Masai from the South. The Darod clients joined the conflict and this explained the severity of the conflict and the heavy defeats of the Warra Daya. In 1867 the Somali invited the Warra Daya elders for a great peace offering, which was accepted by the Warra Daya. However, the feast turned out to be an ambush and thousands of Warra Daya were slaughtered. Extensive Somali raids followed the offering. Most of the remaining Warra Daya were forced to cross the River Tana and sought refuge along the southern and eastern banks of the Tana River. Large numbers of Orma men were killed and an estimated 8,000 women and children were captured. Women and children were often exploited by the Somali and sold as slaves. Since there was a shortage of women under the Somali, they took Orma women as concubines and some were even married by the Somali. The Somalis managed to push the Orma all the way to the Tana river, this essentially was a Reconquest of Jubaland. In order to protect the remaining free Warra Daya on the east bank of the Tana from the Somali, in 1909 the few remaining Warra Daya on the east bank of the Tana were moved by the British to the west bank. These Warra Daya on the west bank became known as the Tana Orma. The decimation of the Tana Orma also resulted in their becoming an isolated ethnical group that no longer shared a border with other Oromo-speaking people.

=== Somali-Oromo agreement and the Wardey ===
Already in the 19th century, there were regularly discussions whether the British should ignore slavery in Juba area or should take action against it. Theoretically, the British were opposed to any form of slavery, but in practice they condoned it, also because they would not be capable to enforce any agreement with the Somali if abolishment of slavery would be a pre-condition. When Kenya became a British protectorate, this discussion resurfaced as it was seen as shameful to have slavery in the British empire. In Tana River District and the North Eastern Province this discussion focused around the position of the clientized Orma amongst the Somali community. It was clear that the Orma clients had not become clients out of their free will, were in fact slaves and could not leave the Somali. Since these Orma clients were, as long as they adhered to paying tribute and ‘symbolic’ submission, often allowed to live in their own villages and keep livestock. An aspect of the 'symbolic' submission was that Orma girls should always have their first sexual intercourse with a Somali. The children of these women were often considered Somali and it enriched the Ogaden with a mixed population. With some pressure of the British the Somali agreed to the Somali-oromo agreement, which stated that the Orma could return to their brothers on the right bank of the Tana, provided they left half of their livestock with the Somali. This agreement also implied clearly that the Somali should remain on the left bank of the Tana. A good number of the enslaved Orma returned, but since the British had limited military power, they were not in a position to guarantee the return of all the Orma who wanted to cross the river. Initially these back-migrants were called Wardey, also written as Waridei Wardeh and Wardei, etc. In 1939 the Somali refuted the Somali-oromo agreement and no clientized Orma crossed the Tana until after Independence.

=== Independence ===
After the Independence of Kenya (1963), many of the remaining clientized Orma returned and this explains the huge population increase of the Orma. In 1971 President Kenyatta officially welcomed the Wardey. Nowadays the term Wardey is mainly used for the clients who returned after Independence. Most of them do not speak Orma. The ones that migrated back during the colonial time are called Orma.

== Population figures ==
Early population figures of the Tana Orma are scanty. The colonial government estimated the number in 1926 at 2,394. In 1932 they were estimated at 5,000. This increase was due to the return of Wardey. The first full count of the Orma took place in 1962. Their number was counted as 15,985 of which 96% lived in Tana River District, 2% in other Coast districts and 1.5% in Garissa. The remaining 0.5% lived scattered over Kenya. In 1979 they were estimated at 32,000. Between 1969 and 1979 their increase was 96%, whereas other ethnical groups as the Pokomo in Tana River County had only a population increase of 12%. This large increase was again due to the back-migration and Somali disguised as Wardey. This ‘back-migration’ has continued since. In 2009 the Orma were counted as 74,146. In 2019 their number was 158,993. For the first time the category Wardey was available under the main category Orma and 65,965 of the Orma categorized themselves as Wardey.

== Religion ==
The Tana Orma converted relatively recently to Islam and primarily after the 1920s and en masse in the 1930s and 1940 and since then almost all are Islamic.

== Culture ==
Both sexes are circumcised (genitally mutilated, in terms of the girls) but female genital mutilation (FGM) has been a practice of controversy in the recent past and many elders are preaching against the act of (FGM) The Tana Orma strictly adhere to marrying outside their moiety, a universally practised custom by all Oromo speaking people.

== Livelihood ==
Although originally the Orma were pastoralists, they have now become increasingly sedentary and economically diversified. The majority, however, is still pastoralist. The Orma pattern of seasonal livestock movement is based on alternating use of riverine floodplain pastures in the dry season and more arid pastures with scattered wells and ponds in the wet season.

== Conflicts between the Tana Orma and other ethnical groups ==
Especially since the collapse of the Somali state in the nineties, regularly there were conflicts between the Orma, Wardey and Somali in Tana River County. In 2012-13 serious conflicts broke out between the Pokomo and Orma resulting in almost 200 dead people. The cause of the conflicts were Orma people encroaching on the Pokomo agricultural area. Two factors have contributed to the transformation of the previous fairly harmonious relationship of the two into very antagonistic conflicts. First the population increase has caused pressure on the limited resources. Secondly the Orma have been pushed southwards by Wardey and Somali people. Since these groups are often better armed, the Orma did not have an alternative but to move southwards, which brought them into conflict with the Pokomo.

== Bibliography ==
- Darroch, Mahomey, Sharpe, et al (1928), Political Record Book Garissa and Tana River District. Nairobi: KNA.
- Kenya National Bureau of Statistics (2019), 2019 Kenya Population and Housing Census.
- Kelly, H. (1992), The Pastoral Orma of Kenya. PhD University of California (Los Angeles).
- Kelly, H. (1990), Commercialization, sedentarization, economic diversification and changing property relations among Orma pastoralists of Kenya: some possible target issues for future research. In 'Property, poverty and people: changing rights in property and problems of pastoral development' by Baxter, P.W.T. and Hogg, R.
- Kirchner, K (2012), Conflicts and Politics in the Tana Delta, Kenya. Leiden: Africa Study Centre.
- Lewis, I.M. (1965), A Modern History of Somaliland; from Nation to State. London: Weidenfeld and Nicolson.
- Rowlands, J.S.S. (1955), An Outline of Tana River History. Mimeo.
- Schlee, Günther (1989), Identities on the move; clanship and pastoralism in Northern Kenya. Manchester: Manchester University Press.
- Schlee, Günther (1992), Who are the Tana Orma? The problem of their identification in a wider Oromo framework (1992). Universität of Bielefeld, Working Paper 170.
- Townsend, N. (1978), Biased symbiosis on Tana River, in W. Weisleder (ed.), The Nomadic Alternative. The Hague: 289-295.
- Turton, E.R. (1970), The Pastoral Tribes of Northern Kenya 1800 – 1916. Thesis University of London.
- Turton, E.R. (1975), Bantu, Galla and Somali Migrations in the Horn of Africa: a reassessment of the Juba/Tana area. Journal of Africa History, 519-535.
- Unknown (1932), Telemugger Annual Report.
- Unknown (1933), Telemugger Annual Report.

== See also ==
- Orma language
- 2012 Tana River District clashes
