= Dobase language =

Cushitic language spoken in Ethiopia

Dobase
- Native to: Ethiopia
- Region: Dirashe special woreda, Southern Ethiopia
- Native speakers: 1,500 (2007 census)
- Language family: Afro-Asiatic: Cushitic; Dullay; Dobase
- Dialects: Dobase (Gobeze); Harso; Mashole; Lohu

Language codes
- ISO 639-3: gwd (part)
- Glottolog: gaww1239

Dobase or Harso–Dobase is a Cushitic language variety spoken in the Dirashe special woreda of the Southern Nations, Nationalities, and People's Region located in southern Ethiopia. It is a part of the Dullay dialect cluster and today often counted as a dialect of Ale, within which it contrasts with the Gawwada–Gollango dialect group.

== Phonology ==
Consonants of Harso
		Labial	Alveolar	Post-alv./ Palatal	Velar	Uvular	Pharyngeal	Glottal
Plosive/ Affricate	voiceless	p, [b]	t	c	k			ʔ
Plosive/ Affricate	voiced	p, [b]	[d], [ɖ], ɗ		g	ɢ		
Plosive/ Affricate	implosive	(ɓ)	[d], [ɖ], ɗ					
Plosive/ Affricate	ejective		tʼ	cʼ	kʼ			
Fricative	voiceless	f	s	ʃ	x		ħ	h
Fricative	voiced	[β]	(z)			[ʁ]	ʕ	
Nasal		m	n	(ɲ)				
Tap			ɾ					
Lateral			l					
Approximant		w		j				

/p k/ become voiced between voiced sounds. [b] remains allophonic, but /g/ is phonemic and represents a merger of [g] from this process with earlier /ɠ/ (found in other dialects, still in Dobase proper) and loanwords from Amharic. The uvular stop /ɢ/ is consistently voiced (when geminate, partly devoiced [ɢ̥ː]). It and /p/ can becomes fricatives [β], [ʁ] between vowels.

/ɗ/ is a weak implosive and also tends towards a voiced stop: [d] before front vowels, retroflex [ɖ] before back vowels. The geminate /ɗɗ/ is strongly preglottalized [ʔɗ].

/c/ and /cʼ/ can be also pronounced as affricates [tʃ], [tʃʼ].

/ɓ/, /z/, /ɲ/ are marginal and mainly occur in loanwords. One native exception is the numeral ezzaħ 'three'.

Free variation between /kʼ/ and /ɢ/ is found in many words, more often in Dobase proper than in Harso, e.g. mikʼaccé ~ miɢaccé 'bone'.
