= 2012–2013 Tana River District clashes =

Ethnic violence in Kenya

2012-2013 Tana River District clashes
- Tana River District (Kenya) The violence occurred in the Tana River District of Coast Province, Kenya.
- Location: 1°30′S 40°0′E; Tana River District
- Date: August 22, 2012 – January 10, 2013
- Target: Orma people
- Attack type: Ethnic-communal clashes between Orma and Pokomo people
- Weapons: Machetes, bows and arrows, spears, handguns
- Deaths: 116
- Perpetrator: Pokomo people

From August 2012 to January 2013, a series of ethnic clashes between the Orma and Pokomo peoples of Kenya's Tana River District resulted in the deaths of at least fifty-two people. The violence was the worst of its kind in Kenya since the country's 2007–08 crisis, which left 118 people dead and more than 13,500 displaced – over 50% of the 13,500 were children, women and the elderly.

== Background ==
The major ethnic groups of the Tana River District are the Pokomo, many of whom are farmers along the Tana River, and the Orma, who are predominantly a cattle-herding nomadic people. The district is generally dry and prone to drought, with erratic rainfall during the March–May and October–December rainy seasons. The climate has sparked numerous clashes between farmers and nomadic peoples over access to water.

Approximately ten days before the ethnic clash on 22 August 2012, three Pokomo people were killed by members of the Orma community. In retaliation, the Pokomo people raided Orma villages and burned more than one hundred houses.

== 2012 ==
=== 22 August incident ===
On 22 August 2012, in the worst violent incident in Kenya since 2007, at least 52 people were killed in ethnic violence in the Tana River District between the Orma and Pokomo groups. The violence occurred in southeast Kenya, in the Reketa area of Tarassa, near the coast and approximately 300 kilometres (190 mi) from the capital, Nairobi.

The ethnic violence was the result of a dispute over land rights for the tribes' chickens. Police believe that the attack was carried out by the Pokomo people, who attacked the Orma, following an Orma invasion of farms belonging to the Pokomo.

The attackers were armed with machetes, bows and arrows, spears and handguns. Thirty-one women, eleven children, and six men were killed during the violence. Of these, thirty-four people were hacked to death with machetes, while fourteen people were burned to death. Four other Kenyans later died from injuries sustained during the attack. In addition, the Pokomo captured approximately two hundred cattle belonging to the Orma.

=== September incident ===
On 7 September, at around 3 a.m., 12 people were killed by the Orma. The Capital FM stated that police and the Kenya Red Cross said the attacks occurred at Tarasaa where houses were burnt, in what is believed to be retaliatory attacks by the Orma people against the Pokomos.

Kenya Red Cross stated that over 300 cattle and 400 goats were raided, and houses torched.

On 10 September, 38 people were killed by the Pokomo, including 9 police officers. The deceased include 16 men, five women, nine police officers and eight children. The officers included five GSU, two Administration Police and two regular police officers. The violence occurred at Kilelengwani Village.

On the next morning, 11 September, three people were killed by the Orma at Semikaro, Laini, Nduru and Shirikisho villages of Tana Delta.

On 13 September, more than 1300 paramilitary police officers were sent to quell unrest in Tana River.

On 17 September, at around 5.45 a.m., 67 houses were torched at Ozi Village – there were no casualties reported. The next day, MP Danson Mungatana claimed that the houses were torched by GSU, sent there earlier from Nairobi to quell the violence.

The same day police found a suspected mass grave. Police were issued with a court order to dig up the suspected grave, but found only part of a human leg. A member of Red Cross reported a strong stench from the area.

=== December incident ===
On Friday, 21 December 2012, renewed fighting ensued, with initial reports indicating the deaths of over 27 people. The brutal raid was carried out in the small hours of the morning. Subsequent reports confirmed that thirty-nine people were killed.

Among the dead were assailants whose corpses were burnt in anger by residents. Police also arrested over 65 suspects in the aftermath of the killings.

== 2013 ==
=== January ===
On 9 January 2013, 11 people were killed in fresh fighting when suspected Pokomo raiders attacked Nduru Village killing six Ormas. Villagers countered the attackers, killing two raiders on the spot, and two more as they pursued them. Another assailant died from injuries while fleeing.

Dawn attacks on 10 January 2013 resulted in the deaths of 11 people in the Pokomo village of Kibusu. The dead included three women, three men and five children. The attack also resulted in the burning of 19 homes in the village, which is approximately 20 km from Nduru village which had been attacked a day earlier. The Kenya Red Cross also indicated that over 112,000 people had been displaced since the fighting begun despite deployment of 2,000 law enforcement officers.

== State reaction ==
The Galole legislator and an Assistant Livestock Minister Dhadho Godhana was arrested and charged with incitement, but was released with a cash bail of Kshs. 500,000.

The same day Kenyan parliament passed a motion urging the executive to send Kenyan defence forces to Tana River. The motion was introduced by Garsen MP Danson Mungatana.

== Judicial inquiry ==
On 22 September, the government set up a Judicial Commission of Inquiry into the Tana River clashes, chaired by High Court judge Grace Nzioka. The full membership of the commission appointed by President Mwai Kibaki is:

- Lady Justice Grace Nzioka – Chair
- Chief Magistrate Emily Ominde
- Principal Magistrate Abdulqadir Lorot Ramadhan

Assisting counsel are:

- Mr Wamuti Ndegwa
- Ms Ruth Luta

Among the witnesses who have testified are:

- Defence minister Yusuf Haji
- Coast Provincial Commissioner Samuel Kilele
- Provincial police boss Aggrey Adoli
- Lands Commissioner Zablon Mabea

== Casualties statistics ==
The following is a table of casualties as captured by Kenya Red Cross as of 12 September 2012.

| Date | Village | Deaths | | | | Casualties | Property lost | | | Households | Population |
| Date | Village | Male | Female | Child | Total | Casualties | House | Cattle | Goat | Households | Population |
|---|---|---|---|---|---|---|---|---|---|---|---|
| 14 August | Kau | 2 | 1 | 0 | 3 | 7 | 110 | 198 | 0 | 324 | 1,924 |
| 22 August | Reketa | 6 | 34 | 13 | 53 | 22 | 78 | 60 | 0 | 383 | 2,298 |
| 1 September | Semikaro | 1 | 0 | 0 | 1 | 2 | 0 | 0 | 200 | 0 | 0 |
| 7 September | Chamwanamuma | 15 | 13 | 1 | 17 | 10 | 94 | 200 | 400 | 1,094 | 6,564 |
| 10 September | Kilelengwani | 25 | 5 | 8 | 38 | 8 | 167 | 0 | 0 | 200 | 1,200 |
| 11 September | Laini | 0 | 0 | 0 | 0 | 0 | 20 | 0 | 0 | 0 | 0 |
| 11 September | Sirikisho | 0 | 0 | 0 | 0 | 0 | 109 | 0 | 0 | 0 | 0 |
| 11 September | Semikaro | 4 | 0 | 0 | 4 | 0 | 0 | 0 | 0 | 0 | 0 |
| 11 September | Nduru | 0 | 0 | 0 | 0 | 0 | 90 | 0 | 0 | 0 | 0 |
| Total | | 51 | 43 | 22 | 116 | 49 | 668 | 458 | 600 | 2,001 | 12,006 |

== See also ==
- Crime in Kenya
- Ethnic conflicts in Kenya
