= Bussa language =

Cushtic language spoken in Ethiopia

Bussa
- Mossiya
- Mossittaata
- Native to: Ethiopia
- Region: Dirashe special woreda, Southern Ethiopia
- Native speakers: 18,000 (2007 census)
- Language family: Afro-Asiatic: Cushitic; Lowland East; Oromoid; Konsoid; Bussa
- Dialects: Moro-Toysala; Dubaysho; Nalo

Language codes
- ISO 639-3: dox
- Glottolog: buss1239
- ELP: Bussa

Bussa, or Mossiya, is a Cushitic language spoken in the Dirashe special woreda of the Southern Nations, Nationalities, and People's Region located in southern Ethiopia. The people themselves, numbering 18,000 according to the 2007 census, call their language Mossittaata.

Bussa is highly influenced by surrounding Cushitic and Omotic languages and should be considered endangered according to Gurmu (2005). Speakers of the North Bussa variety are shifting to Oromo, Dirasha or Amharic, whereas speakers of the West Bussa variety are shifting to the Omotic languages Zargulla, Zayse and Gamo. Important factors for the ongoing language shift include intermarriage with other ethnic groups and heavy contact with neighbouring people.
