= Eastern Oromo language =

Variety of Oromo language spoken in Ethiopia

Eastern Oromo
- Afaan Oromoo Bahaa
- Native to: Ethiopia
- Region: Oromia
- Native speakers: 11 million (2022)
- Language family: Afro-Asiatic: Cushitic; Lowland East; Oromoid; Oromo; Eastern Oromo
- Writing system: Latin

Language codes
- ISO 639-3: hae
- Glottolog: east2652
- Eastern Oromo

Eastern Oromo is a dialect of the Oromo language widely spoken in the East Hararghe Zone, West Hararghe Zone and northern Bale Zone of the Oromia Region of Ethiopia.

According to Ethnologue, there are 11 million speakers of this Oromo form. However, the 1994 Ethiopian national census did not break down language speakers according to dialect, although it reported 2,570,293 speakers of Oromo in those two zones.

== Literature ==
- Owens, Jonathan. 1985. A grammar of Harar Oromo (Northeastern Ethiopia): including a text and a glossary. Cushitic language studies; Bd. 4) Hamburg: Buske.
