= Orma language =

Variety of the Oromo language spoken in Kenya

Orma
- Native to: Kenya
- Region: Tana River District, Lamu District, Kilifi District
- Ethnicity: Orma
- Native speakers: 92,000 (2019 census)
- Language family: Afro-Asiatic: Cushitic; Lowland East; Oromoid; Oromo; Southern Oromo?; Orma
- Dialects: Munyo; Orma
- Writing system: Latin

Language codes
- ISO 639-3: orc
- Glottolog: orma1241

Orma is a variety of the Oromo language spoken by the Orma people in Kenya. It is a dialect of Southern Oromo.
