= Sakuye people =

The Sakuye are cushitic people living in Marsabit, Tana River and Isiolo counties.

== Clans ==
• Arsuwa

• Dhelle/ Ilani.

• Hora

• Kurno

• Madharbah

• Miigo

• Warsua

• Warfura

== Population ==
The 1979 Kenyan census reported this group had 1,824 persons in Kenya, but Günther Schlee believes this number to be "definitely too low". The 1969 census gave 4,369 as their number, and the apparent decrease is not due to biological factors. In the 2019 census, they numbered 47,006. Because of their language and their inter-locking settlements, many Sakuye would probably have identified themselves as Boran or Kenyan Somalis when asked for their tribe.

== Language ==
According to Ethnologue, Sakuye is a dialect of the Afaan Oromo language, though it has some significant differences. The Sakuye people who speak Afaan Oromo are mostly found in Kenya.

Their name is derived from the name of one of the traditional divisions of Oromo territory, Saaku, which is an area north of Marsabit. Thus, Saaku-ye means "from Saaku" or "of Saaku" in Afaan Oromo. When a group of Rendille moved north from Marsabit, their Borana neighbors referred to them as the "Saakuye".

== History ==
The Sakuye are Sunni Muslims belonging to the Dir clan who moved from Afgooye District in the early 18th century after the Battle of Merca between Bimaal and the Sultanete of Geledi

After arriving in present-day Marsabit, Sakuye elders say that they lived under Rendille kinship for a period not exactly known and that the Sakuye later left after their efforts to spread Islam to the Rendile became futile.

Sakuye elders further state that while heading downwards is when the two groups that later formed sakuye met. The 7 Clans who trace their lineage to Biimal and the 5 clans who trace their lineage to Garre became Sakuye, a name referred to them by the Boran meaning people of Saaku. The Sakuye people later joined the War liibin Federation and made dabel their home but many later left and are now widespread in current day Isiolo. The War libin Federation included the Boran, Ajuuran, Garre and Gabra.

The Five Miigo clans who originate from the Garre tribe are said to have been speaking Afaan Oromo even before meeting the other clans and settling in borana territory, Afaan Oromo was already a language adopted by the garre and is now the language predominantly spoken by the sakuyes.

Following Kenyan independence the Sakuyes joined the rest of the Somalis in their attempt to secede and join the Somali Republic. Most of their livestock was killed by the government forces during the Shifta War (1963–1967), reducing many Sakuye to poverty. The traditional camel-oriented rituals, with a nominal Muslim affiliation, became much less important after the destruction of the herds and the Sakuye became Husayniyya, followers of the Sufi order founded by the Somali Sheikh Hussein whose tomb lies in the village named for him in Bale, Ethiopia. Today the Sakuye population is divided between those in Dabel and those in Isiolo.
