= Gidole =

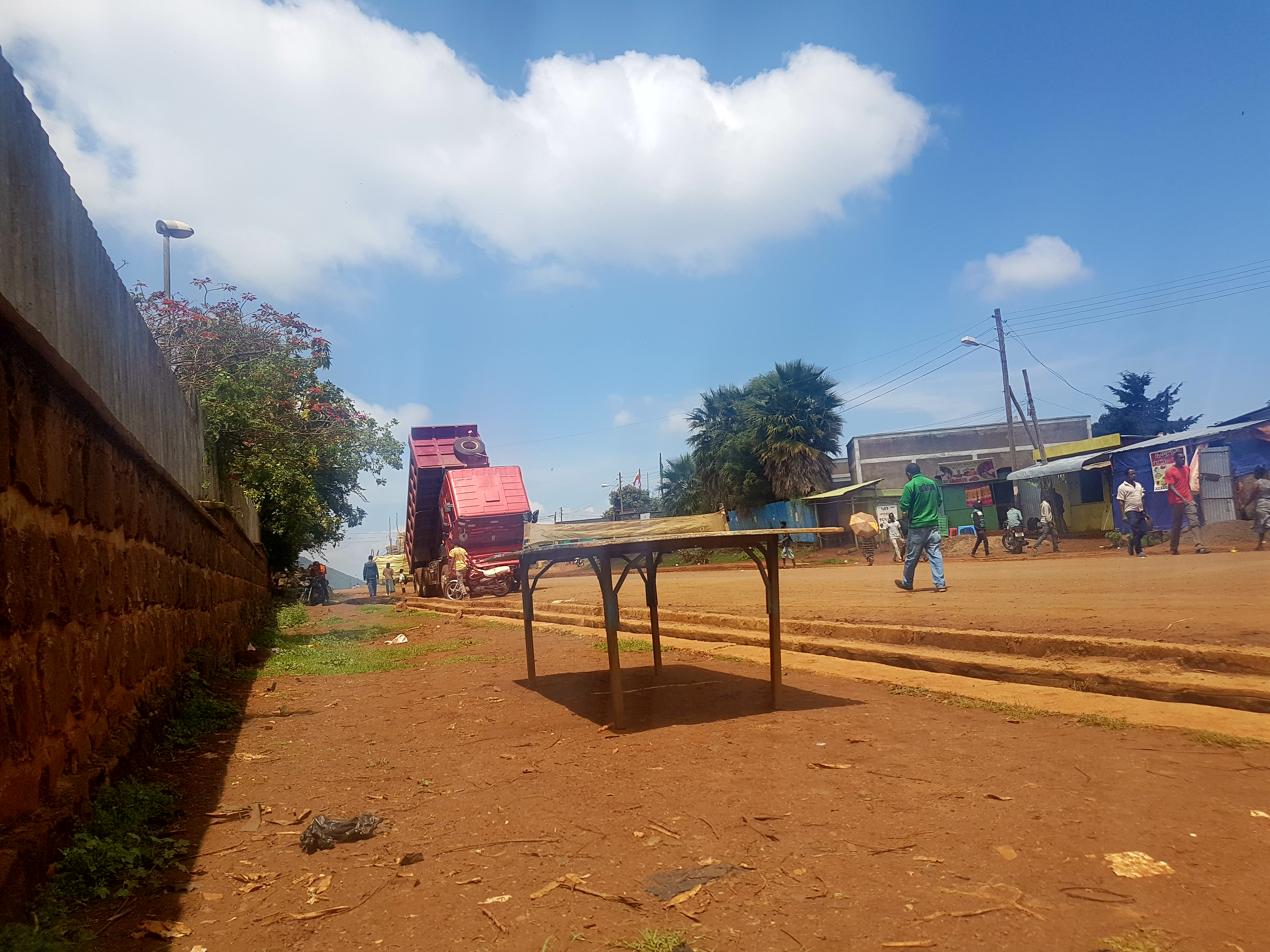

Gidole is a town in southern Ethiopia, and is the administrative center of the Dirashe special woreda. Located in the Southern Nations, Nationalities, and Peoples Region, it sits at a latitude and longitude of 05°39′N 37°22′E with an elevation ranging from 2045 to 2650 meters above sea level. The town Gidole is named after the Kitoola people with a little bit modification, an ethnic group inhabiting southern Ethiopia.

‘Kitoola’ ethnic is a large group living in and around Gardulla Mountain as well as on the eastern flank of Ganjuli basin. This Kitoola ethnic comprises five large societies (viz; Dhirashaa, Mosiye, Kusume, Mashole, Dhobase) and few migrants having different backgrounds. The Kitoolians speak the Cushitic language 'Kitoolia' with different dialects. They use different musical instruments for their casual holiday celebrations. Shonqaa, mayra, kulluutot, filla and lollat are among many.

== History ==
According to Oscar Rudolph Neumann, who visited the town in 1902, Gidole was the seat of the queen of the Kitoola until the Ethiopians under Menelik II conquered them; the woman was still alive at the time of Neumann's visit.

During the Italian occupation, the occupiers opened a post office in Gidole on either 11 or 17 November 1937; the sources are unclear about the exact date.

In the 1950s, Gidole was the administrative center of one of the provinces, Gamo Gofa Teqlay Gizat, which was later incorporated to create Gamo-Gofa province. During the next decade, Islam won converts in the area and a mosque was built in the town. At the same time, Borana caravans supplied the market in Gidole with salt.

== Demographics ==
Based on figures from the Central Statistical Agency in 2005, Gidole has an estimated total population of 14,799 of whom 7,107 were men and 7,692 women. The 1994 national census reported this town had a total population of 8,167 of whom 3,935 were men and 4,232 women.
