= Konso language =

Cushitic language spoken in southwestern Ethiopia

Konso
- Afaa Xonso
- Native to: Ethiopia
- Region: South of Lake Chamo in the bend of the Sagan River
- Native speakers: 240,000 (2007)
- Language family: Afro-Asiatic: Cushitic; Lowland East; Oromoid; Konsoid; Konso
- Dialects: Duuro; Fasha; Karatti; Kholme
- Writing system: Latin script

Language codes
- ISO 639-3: kxc
- Glottolog: kons1243

Konso (Komso, Khonso, also Af Kareti, Afa Karatti, Conso, Gato, Karate, Kareti) is a Lowland East Cushitic language spoken in southwest Ethiopia. Native speakers of Konso number about 200,000 (SIL 2005). Konso is closely related to Dirasha (also known as Gidole), and serves as a "trade language"—or lingua franca—beyond the area of the Konso people.

The Grammar of Konso was first described by Hellenthal (2004), and later, in more detail, by Ongaye (2013). The New Testament was published in the Konso language in 2002.

== Phonology ==
=== Consonants ===
Unlike its Oromoid relatives and most East African languages in general, Konso distinguishes neither voiced nor ejective consonants. Instead, it has a series of implosive stops, including the extremely rare uvular implosive /ʛ/.

| | Labial | Alveolar | Palatal | Dorsal | Glottal |
|---|---|---|---|---|---|
| Nasal | m | n | ɲ | | |
| Plosive | p | t | c | k | ʔ |
| Implosive | ɓ | ɗ | ʄ | ʛ | |
| Fricative | f | s | ʃ | χ | h |
| Approximant | w | l | j | | |
| Trill | | r | | | |

=== Vowels ===
Typical of a Cushitic language, Konso distinguishes five short and five long vowels:

| | Front | Central | Back |
|---|---|---|---|
| Close | i iː | | u uː |
| Mid | e eː | | o oː |
| Open | | a aː | |

== Orthography ==
An alphabet for Konso was developed by the SSNPR education Bureau and SIL Ethiopia, with financial support by Wycliffe Norway. It is used in a Konso dictionary, and is currently adopted by the Konso people for general use.

1. a: /a/
2. b: /ɓ/
3. c: /c/
4. d: /ɗ/
5. e: /e/
6. f: /f/
7. h: /h/
8. i: /i/
9. j: /ʄ/
10. k: /k/
11. l: /l/
12. m: /m/
13. n: /n/
14. ny: /ɲ/
15. o: /o/
16. p: /p/
17. q: /ʛ/ (<g> is sometimes used)
18. r: /r/
19. s: /s/
20. sh: /ʃ/
21. t: /t/
22. u: /u/
23. w: /w/
24. x: /χ/
25. y: /j/
26. ': /ʔ/

Vowel length is indicated by doubling the vowel

== See also ==
- Konso
