= Dirasha language =

Cushitic language spoken in Ethiopia

Dirasha
- D'iraassh
- Native to: Ethiopia
- Region: Omo Region, in the hills west of Lake Chamo, around Gidole town.
- Native speakers: 74,000 (2007)
- Language family: Afro-Asiatic: Cushitic; East; Lowland East; Oromoid; Konsoid; Dirasha
- Writing system: Geʽez (Used in Church); Latin

Language codes
- ISO 639-3: gdl
- Glottolog: dira1242

Dirasha (also known as Diraasha, Dhirasha, Dirayta, Gidole, Ghidole, Gardulla) is a member of the Cushitic branch of the Afro-Asiatic family. It is spoken in the Omo region of Ethiopia, in the hills west of Lake Chamo, around the town of Gidole and close to the peak of the mountain Gardulla.

According to Wondwosen Tesfaye Abire, "Dirasha" is the name of the people, and the name of the language is given variously as "Dirashitata, Dirayta and Diraytata". None of these names seem to be derogatory, but rather different ways of referring to the same language.

The Diraytata language is spoken by approximately 65,000 people, primarily in the Omo region of Ethiopia. A number of speakers also use Oromo or Konso.

The language has a three ejective consonant phonemes and two implosive consonant phonemes, fitting the pattern of the Ethiopian Language Area. It has two tones and five vowels. Duration (or gemination) is distinctive for both consonants and vowels.

== Phonology ==
=== Phonetic Inventory: Consonant IPA Symbols ===
Dirayta transcription utilizes symbols that differ from those of the traditional IPA chart. Each ejective may be written two ways.

	Labial	Alveolar	Palatal	Velar	Glottal
Nasal	m	n	ɲ ⟨ñ⟩	ŋ	
Plosive	p	t	c	k	ʔ
Ejective		t’ ⟨t'⟩ ⟨ṭ⟩	tʃ’ ⟨č'⟩ ⟨č̣⟩	k’ ⟨k'⟩ ⟨ḳ⟩	
Implosive	ɓ	ɗ			
Fricative	f	s	ʃ ⟨š⟩		h
Affricate			tʃ ⟨č⟩		
Lateral		l			
Flap		r			
Glide	w		j ⟨y⟩		

When /n/ and /ʔ/ occur as /nʔ/, they contract to form ŋ. /n/ and /ʔ/ must occur in that sequence, with no intervening vowels or consonants.

=== Phonetic Inventory: Vowel IPA Symbols ===
	Front	Back
High	i	u
Mid	e	o ɔ
Low	a	

=== Low and High Tones ===
-Dirayta is a 2-tone language.

-Low Tone: Absence of accentual markings

Low Tone: Monosyllabic CVVC words
Vowel	Sample Word: Dirayta	Sample Word: English Translation
i	hiip	local beer
e	meet	child
a	paas	cleaver
u	Could not locate example	
o	Could not locate example	
ɔ	Could not locate example	

-High Tone: Represented by acute accent diacritic above vowel (í, é, á, ú, ó, ɔ́)

-Mandatory for monosyllabic CVC and disyllabic CVC/CVVC words

High Tone Accentual Patterns: Monosyllabic CVC Words
Vowel	Sample Word: Dirayta	Sample Word: English Translation
í	Could not locate example	
é	hén	five
á	káp	mouth
ú	Could not locate example	
ó	pón	dry season
ɔ́	Could not locate example	

-For disyllabic words, only one syllable may contain high tone.

-High tone is (mostly) assigned to the first vowel within the initial syllable. However, high tone may be assigned to the first vowel within the ultimate syllable.

High Tone Accentual Patterns: Disyllabic CVC/CVVC Words
Vowel	Sample Word: Dirayta	Sample Word: English Translation
í	šíra ʃíra	liver
é	ʔérpa	lie
é	ʔéetot	evening meal
é	saytét	oil
é	waalét	long-necked calabash
á	párat	year
á	máakot	snake
ú	kúnɗa	fruit
ó	sóha	meat
ó	móohot	sky-god
ó	porrót	barley
ɔ́	Could not locate example	

-For trisyllabic words, high tone is (mostly) assigned to the ultimate syllable. However, high tone may be assigned to BOTH initial and ultimate syllables.

High Tone Accentual Patterns: Trisyllabic CVC/CVVC Words
Vowel	Sample Word: Dirayta	Sample Word: English Translation
í	ɗímaʔmaʔ	rib-cage
é	mat'aatét	round white potato
á	káč̣erra	cloth
á	palawwát	type of bird
á, á	háwallát	type of dumpling
á, ó	k'áalalót ḳáalalót	thin ale-gruel
ú	mút'ura múṭura	heart
ú, é	k'úrt'ummét ḳúrṭummét	fish
ó	kópila	shield
ó, á	k'óhanát ḳóhanát	afternoon coffee session
ɔ́	Could not locate example	

== Grammar ==
=== Pluralization of Nouns ===
Pluralisation of nouns in Diraytata is a complex process that depends on several factors, such as the gender, number, case, and definiteness of the noun. According to Wondwosen, Diraytata has four genders: masculine, feminine, plural, and neuter. The plural gender is used for nouns that are inherently plural, such as body parts, liquids, and collective nouns. The neuter gender is used for nouns that are not classified as masculine, feminine, or plural. The number system of Diraytata distinguishes between singular, plural, and paucal. The singular is used for one entity, the plural is used for more than one entity, and the paucal is used for a few entities. The case system of Diraytata marks the grammatical function of the noun in the sentence, such as subject, object, or possessor. The definiteness system of Diraytata indicates whether the noun is specific or non-specific, known or unknown, or new or old information.

The pluralisation of nouns in Diraytata is achieved by adding suffixes to the noun stem. The suffixes vary according to the gender, case, and definiteness of the noun. Here are some examples of how nouns are pluralised in Diraytata:

- Masculine nouns: The plural suffix for masculine nouns is -ool, which changes to -aal after a consonant. For example, the noun lúban 'lion' becomes lubanjool 'lions' in the plural. The paucal suffix for masculine nouns is -aa, which changes to -a after a consonant. For example, the noun lúban 'lion' becomes lubanjaa 'a few lions' in the paucal. The singular suffix for masculine nouns is -titi, which changes to -ti after a consonant. For example, the noun lúban 'lion' becomes lubantiti 'a/the particular lion' in the singular.
- Feminine nouns: The plural suffix for feminine nouns is -oot, which changes to -at after a consonant. For example, the noun ʔámba 'breast' becomes ʔambatoot 'breasts' in the plural. The paucal suffix for feminine nouns is -aa, which changes to -a after a consonant. For example, the noun ʔámba 'breast' becomes ʔambataa 'a few breasts' in the paucal. The singular suffix for feminine nouns is -titi, which changes to -ti after a consonant. For example, the noun ʔámba 'breast' becomes ʔambatiti 'a/the particular breast' in the singular.
- Plural nouns: The plural suffix for plural nouns is -ool, which does not change after a consonant. For example, the noun ʔíilla 'teeth' remains ʔíilla 'teeth' in the plural. The paucal suffix for plural nouns is -aa, which changes to -a after a consonant. For example, the noun ʔíilla 'teeth' becomes ʔillaa 'a few teeth' in the paucal. The singular suffix for plural nouns is -titi, which changes to -ti after a consonant. For example, the noun ʔíilla 'teeth' becomes ʔillati 'a/the particular tooth' in the singular.
- Neuter nouns: The plural suffix for neuter nouns is -ool, which changes to -aal after a consonant. For example, the noun ʔóokka 'calf' becomes ʔookkaal 'calves' in the plural. The paucal suffix for neuter nouns is -aa, which changes to -a after a consonant. For example, the noun ʔóokka 'calf' becomes ʔookkaa 'a few calves' in the paucal. The singular suffix for neuter nouns is -titi, which changes to -ti after a consonant. For example, the noun ʔóokka 'calf' becomes ʔookkati 'a/the particular calf' in the singular.

The case and definiteness markers are added after the number suffixes. The case markers are -a for nominative, -i for accusative, -e for genitive, and -o for dative. The definiteness markers are -ta for definite and -ra for indefinite. For example, the noun lúban 'lion' can have the following forms in the plural:

- lubanjool 'lions' (nominative, indefinite)
- lubanjoolta 'the lions' (nominative, definite)
- lubanjoolra 'some lions' (nominative, indefinite)
- lubanjooli 'lions' (accusative, indefinite)
- lubanjoolita 'the lions' (accusative, definite)
- lubanjoolira 'some lions' (accusative, indefinite)
- lubanjoolo 'to lions' (dative, indefinite)
- lubanjoolota 'to the lions' (dative, definite)
- lubanjoolora 'to some lions' (dative, indefinite)
- lubanjoolo 'of lions' (genitive, indefinite)
- lubanjoolota 'of the lions' (genitive, definite)
- lubanjoolora 'of some lions' (genitive, indefinite)

=== Inflection of Verbs based on the Tense, Aspect, and Mood ===
The Diraytata language inflects verbs based on tense, aspect, and mood by using a combination of prefixes, suffixes, and tone patterns. According to Wondwosen, Diraytata has three main tenses: past, present, and future. The past tense is marked by a low tone on the verb stem, the present tense is marked by a high tone on the verb stem, and the future tense is marked by a prefix ʔan- and a high tone on the verb stem. For example, the verb ʔáaf 'spread' has the following forms in the three tenses:

- Past: ʔaaf 'spread' (low tone)
- Present: ʔáaf 'spread' (high tone)
- Future: ʔanáaf 'will spread' (prefix and high tone)

The aspect system of Diraytata distinguishes between perfective and imperfective aspects. The perfective aspect indicates that the action is completed or viewed as a whole, while the imperfective aspect indicates that the action is ongoing or viewed as a part. The perfective aspect is marked by a suffix -i for singular subjects and -u for plural subjects. The imperfective aspect is marked by a suffix -a for singular subjects and -o for plural subjects. For example, the verb ʔáaf 'spread' has the following forms in the two aspects:

- Perfective: ʔáaf-i 'spread' (singular), ʔáaf-u 'spread' (plural)
- Imperfective: ʔáaf-a 'spreading' (singular), ʔáaf-o 'spreading' (plural)

The mood system of Diraytata expresses the speaker's attitude or modality towards the action. Diraytata has four main moods: indicative, imperative, subjunctive, and conditional. The indicative mood is used for factual or neutral statements, the imperative mood is used for commands or requests, the subjunctive mood is used for wishes or hypothetical situations, and the conditional mood is used for conditional or hypothetical situations. The indicative mood is marked by a suffix -ti for singular subjects and -tu for plural subjects. The imperative mood is marked by a suffix -ta for singular subjects and -to for plural subjects. The subjunctive mood is marked by a suffix -te for singular subjects and -té for plural subjects. The conditional mood is marked by a suffix -tá for singular subjects and -tó for plural subjects. For example, the verb ʔáaf 'spread' has the following forms in the four moods:

	singular		plural	
Indicative	ʔáaf-ti	'spread'	ʔáaf-tu	'spread'
Imperative	ʔáaf-ta	'spread!'	ʔáaf-to	'spread!'
Subjunctive	ʔáaf-te	'spread'	ʔáaf-té	'spread'
Conditional	ʔáaf-tá	'spread'	ʔáaf-tó	'spread'

The tense, aspect, and mood markers can be combined to form complex verb forms that express various temporal, aspectual, and modal meanings. For example, the verb ʔáaf 'spread' can have the following complex forms:

- ʔaaf-i-ti 'spread' (past perfective indicative singular)
- ʔáaf-a-ta 'spreading' (present imperfective imperative singular)
- ʔanáaf-u-te 'will spread' (future perfective subjunctive plural)
- ʔanáaf-o-tó 'will be spreading' (future imperfective conditional plural)

=== Verbs Agreeing with their Subjects' Nouns ===
Verbs in the Diraytata language agree with their subject nouns in terms of number and person. This means that the verb form changes depending on whether the subject is singular or plural, and whether the subject is first, second, or third person. For example, the verb ʔáaf 'spread' has different forms depending on the subject:

	singular		plural	
1st person	ʔáaf-ti	'I spread'	ʔáaf-tu	'we spread'
2nd person	ʔáaf-ta	'you spread'	ʔáaf-to	'you spread'
3rd person	ʔáaf-te	'he/she/it spreads'	ʔáaf-té	'they spread'

some more verbs and their forms according to the number and person of the subject:

		ʔáan 'eat'	ʔáas 'drink'	ʔáab 'sleep'	ʔáat 'walk'	ʔáal 'sing'
1st person	singular	ʔáan-ti 'I eat'	ʔáas-ti 'I drink'	ʔáab-ti 'I sleep'	ʔáat-ti 'I walk'	ʔáal-ti 'I sing'
1st person	plural	ʔáan-tu 'we eat'	ʔáas-tu 'we drink'	ʔáab-tu 'we sleep'	ʔáat-tu 'we walk'	ʔáal-tu 'we sing'
2nd person	singular	ʔáan-ta 'you eat'	ʔáas-ta 'you drink'	ʔáab-ta 'you sleep'	ʔáat-ta 'you walk'	ʔáal-ta 'you sing'
2nd person	plural	ʔáan-to 'you eat'	ʔáas-to 'you drink'	ʔáab-to 'you sleep'	ʔáat-to 'you walk'	ʔáal-to 'you sing'
3rd person	singular	ʔáan-te 'he/she/it eats'	ʔáas-te 'he/she/it drinks'	ʔáab-te 'he/she/it sleeps'	ʔáat-te 'he/she/it walks'	ʔáal-te 'he/she/it sings'
3rd person	plural	ʔáan-té 'they eat'	ʔáas-té 'they drink'	ʔáab-té 'they sleep'	ʔáat-té 'they walk'	ʔáal-té 'they sing'

The verb suffixes are the same for all verbs, regardless of their meaning or stem. The suffixes indicate the number and person of the subject, and also the mood of the verb. The tense and aspect of the verb are marked by tone and other suffixes.

The subject-verb agreement in Diraytata is similar to the subject-verb agreement in English, which also changes the verb form according to the number and person of the subject. For example, the verb 'spread' has different forms depending on the subject:

- I spread
- we spread
- you spread
- he/she/it spreads
- they spread

However, unlike English, Diraytata does not have a separate pronoun system; instead, it uses verb suffixes to indicate the person and number of the subject. This means that the subject noun is often omitted in Diraytata unless it is needed for clarity or emphasis. For example, depending on the context, the sentence ʔáaf-ti 'I spread' can also mean 'I spread it' or 'I spread them'. The subject noun can be added before the verb if it is necessary to specify the subject or the object. For example, the sentence ʔáaf-ti ʔóokka 'I spread the calf' has both the subject noun 'I' and the object noun 'the calf'.

=== Adjectives in Diraytata ===
Adjectives are words that modify or describe nouns. In the Diraytata language, adjectives are a type of modifier that agree with the noun they modify in terms of gender, number, case, and definiteness. According to Wondwosen, Diraytata has four genders: masculine, feminine, plural, and neuter. The number system of Diraytata distinguishes between singular, plural, and paucal. The case system of Diraytata marks the grammatical function of the noun in the sentence, such as subject, object, or possessor. The definiteness system of Diraytata indicates whether the noun is specific or non-specific, known or unknown, or new or old information.

The agreement of adjectives with nouns in Diraytata is achieved by adding suffixes to the adjective stem. The suffixes vary according to the gender, case, and definiteness of the noun. Here are some examples of how adjectives agree with nouns in Diraytata:

- Masculine nouns: The adjective suffix for masculine nouns is -i, which changes to -e after a consonant. For example, the adjective ʔáan 'big' becomes ʔaani 'big' when modifying a masculine noun. The adjective ʔáab 'small' becomes ʔaabe 'small' when modifying a masculine noun.
- Feminine nouns: The adjective suffix for feminine nouns is -a, which changes to -e after a consonant. For example, the adjective ʔáan 'big' becomes ʔaana 'big' when modifying a feminine noun. The adjective ʔáab 'small' becomes ʔaaba 'small' when modifying a feminine noun.
- Plural nouns: The adjective suffix for plural nouns is -u, which does not change after a consonant. For example, the adjective ʔáan 'big' becomes ʔaanu 'big' when modifying a plural noun. The adjective ʔáab 'small' becomes ʔaabu 'small' when modifying a plural noun.
- Neuter nouns: The adjective suffix for neuter nouns is -i, which changes to -e after a consonant. For example, the adjective ʔáan 'big' becomes ʔaani 'big' when modifying a neuter noun. The adjective ʔáab 'small' becomes ʔaabe 'small' when modifying a neuter noun.

The case and definiteness markers are added after the adjective suffixes.

The case markers are -a for nominative, -i for accusative, -e for genitive, and -o for dative. The definiteness markers are -ta for definite and -ra for indefinite. For example, the adjective ʔáan 'big' can have the following forms when modifying a masculine noun:

- ʔaani 'big' (nominative, indefinite)
- ʔaanita 'the big' (nominative, definite)
- ʔaanira 'some big' (nominative, indefinite)
- ʔaanii 'big' (accusative, indefinite)
- ʔaaniita 'the big' (accusative, definite)
- ʔaaniira 'some big' (accusative, indefinite)
- ʔaanio 'to big' (dative, indefinite)
- ʔaaniota 'to the big' (dative, definite)
- ʔaaniira 'to some big' (dative, indefinite)
- ʔaanio 'of big' (genitive, indefinite)
- ʔaaniota 'of the big' (genitive, definite)
- ʔaaniira 'of some big' (genitive, indefinite)

=== Adverbs in Diraytata ===
In the Diraytata language, adverbs are a type of modifier that do not agree with the word they modify, but rather have a fixed form. According to Wondwosen, Diraytata has several types of adverbs, such as:

- Manner adverbs: These adverbs indicate how the action is performed or the quality of the state. They are usually derived from adjectives by adding the suffix -an. For example, the adjective ʔáan 'big' becomes the adverb ʔáanan 'bigly' or 'greatly'. The adjective ʔáab 'small' becomes the adverb ʔáaban 'smallly' or 'slightly'.
- Time adverbs: These adverbs indicate when the action takes place or the duration of the state. They are usually derived from nouns by adding the suffix -i. For example, the noun ʔáan 'day' becomes the adverb ʔáani 'daily' or 'today'. The noun ʔáab 'night' becomes the adverb ʔáabi 'nightly' or 'tonight'.
- Place adverbs: These adverbs indicate where the action takes place or the location of the state. They are usually derived from nouns by adding the suffix -o. For example, the noun ʔáan 'house' becomes the adverb ʔáano 'at home' or 'homeward'. The noun ʔáab 'field' becomes the adverb ʔáabo 'in the field' or 'fieldward'.
- Degree adverbs: These adverbs indicate the extent or intensity of the action or the state. They are usually derived from adjectives or nouns by adding the suffix -aa. For example, the adjective ʔáan 'big' becomes the adverb ʔáanaa 'very big' or 'too big'. The noun ʔáab 'small' becomes the adverb ʔáabaa 'very small' or 'too small'.

=== Independent Subject pronouns ===
The Diraytata language, also known as Dirasha, has a unique system for indicating the subject of a sentence. Unlike English, Diraytata does not have a separate pronoun system; instead, it uses verb suffixes to indicate the person and number of the subject. This means that the subject noun is often omitted in Diraytata unless it is needed for clarity or emphasis^{1}. For example, depending on the context, the sentence ʔáaf-ti could mean 'I'.

This system is quite different from languages like English, which use independent subject pronouns (I, you, he, she, it, we, they) in addition to verb conjugations. In Diraytata, the information about the subject is incorporated into the verb itself.

=== Negation of Verbs in Diraytata ===
Diraytata language uses a negative suffix -n to negate a verb in the present tense. For example, the verb k’ar means ‘to go’, and the negated form is k’ar-n meaning ‘not to go’. In the past tense, the negative suffix -n is attached to the past tense marker -t, resulting in -tn. For example, the verb k’ar-t means ‘went’, and the negated form is k’ar-tn meaning ‘did not go’.
