= Southern Oromo language =

Variety of Oromo spoken by the Borana

Southern Oromo
- Borana
- Region: Kenya, Ethiopia, Somalia
- Ethnicity: Borana Oromo, Sakuye
- Native speakers: 9.6 million (2019–2024)
- Language family: Afro-Asiatic: Cushitic; Lowland East; Oromoid; Oromo; Southern Oromo
- Writing system: Latin

Language codes
- ISO 639-3: gax
- Glottolog: bora1271
- Southern Oromo

Southern Oromo, or Borana (after one of its dialects), is a variety of Oromo spoken in southern Ethiopia and northern Kenya by the Borana people. Günther Schlee also notes that it is the native language of a number of related peoples, such as the Sakuye.

Dialects are Borana proper (Boran, Borena), possibly Arsi (Arussi, Arusi) and Guji (Gujji, Jemjem) in Ethiopia and, in Kenya, Karayu, Salale (Selale), and Gabra (Gabbra, Gebra).

Boraana Oromo is one of the many Oromo languages spoken amongst Ethiopians and Kenyans. Boraana Oromo (Southern Oromo) derives from the Afrosiatic language family whilst belonging to the Cushitic branch. Oromo has the largest number of speakers out the Cushitic branch at an estimated 37 million. Out of the 37 million Oromo speakers up to 18 million are speaking Boraana Oromo. The Boraana speakers and people are solely based in the southern region (Oromia) of Ethiopia and the northern frontier district of Kenya. Most Kenyan Boraana people can be found in towns like Tula, Garba, Isiolo and Marsabit. Young Ethiopians that have migrated to Marsabit have very strong knowledge of the Boraana language. Boraana is a major dialect of the Oromo language but as of yet does not have extensive easily accessible information documented.

Commonly Boraana is referred to locally as Afaan Borana and has been spelled and described several different ways (Borana, Boraana, Borena, Booranaa, Southern Oromo).The Gadaa system (an age-grading system) also known as generation grading, has been practiced without interruption by the Boraana people. This Gadaa practice can only be found within a handful of Cushitic speaking societes in Ethiopia. The Boraana people, practices and language are fascinating and even in current times only a couple books written have a clear in depth description on the topic of Boraana Oromo phonology and morhphology (Harry Stroomers Grammar of Boraana Oromo and his other Studies of Oromo in general).

The Boraana dialect of Oromo is an important depiction of Southern Oromo and has unique systems that make up the language. Though Boraana is unique in its own systems, it does share some cluster simplification rules in the verb paradigm with Orma (another Southern Oromo dialect). Previously B. W. Andrzejewski conducted a studies of Boraana Oromo particularly in tone, phonetics, phonology as well as plural formations (1957, 1960, 1962, 1972). In 1973 an informative Boraana dictionary, Dizionario Borana-Italiano, was written and published by Venturino but lacked consistent transcription. In 1978 the Bible Society of Kenya published Wold'ak'isaa Haraa Afaan Boranatiin T'aafani (The New Testament in Borana) and Kitaana Uumama, the Boraana Genesis translation. In both 1980 and 1982 Owens conducted mentionable and important studies on 'case' and 'tone' in Boraana. Overall a few scholars have conducted valuable contributions to the overall available written text on Boraana Oromo.

== History ==
Oromo is valued as an important African language, and according to Grover Hudson it is "one of the five or six most important languages in Africa". Previously the Oromo population were referred to as "Galla" (the term description disputed) but have adapted the self name Oromo to indicate themselves, or make use of their tribe name. The Oromo are more than 7000 years old and originated in southern Ethiopia expanding once the Oromo migrations began near 1530. There are 15 Oromo dialects with the possibility of more that have not been documented. These dialects are split into three major groups: Western, Eastern and Southern. Ethiopia has the largest amount of Oromo speakers with 33.8% or around 27 million, whilst Kenya has a relatively lower amount around 300,000 and Somalia with a mentionable 45,000. Oromo is one of the official languages in Ethiopia but brings mixed reactions among its use. Kenya does not recognize Oromo as an official language and continues to keep its distance as a whole. Though the elder Kenyans still use Oromo the younger generation operate solely on Swahili and English, the two officially recognized languages.

== Dialects ==
Oromo can be divided into three dialect groups: west central, eastern, and southern.

- West Central Oromo
  - Raya
  - Wollo
  - Salale
  - Shoa/Tulama
  - Wellegga/Mecha
- Eastern Oromo
  - Harar
- Southern Oromo
  - Kereyu
  - Arsi
  - Barentu
  - Guji
  - Boraana
  - Gabra
  - Orma
  - Sakuye
  - Munyo

== Phonology ==
Within the Boraana language there are consonants, allophones of consonants, vowels and stress. Boraana Oromo is a tonal language and is unique but has common similarities with some of the other dialects of Oromo. The smallest unit of meaningful sound are called phonemes and are present within the Boraana language. Boraana contains six passive articulators which may differ in areas yet some merge into each other.

=== Consonants ===
		Labial	Dental/ Alveolar	Palatal	Velar	Glottal
Nasal		m	n	ɲ	(ŋ)	
Stop/ Affricate	voiceless	(p)	t	t͡ʃ	k	
Stop/ Affricate	voiced	b	d	d͡ʒ		
Stop/ Affricate	ejective	pʼ	tʼ	t͡ʃʼ	kʼ	
Stop/ Affricate	implosive		ɗ			
Fricative	voiceless	f	s	ʃ		h
Fricative	voiced		(z)			
Rhotic			r			
Lateral			l			
Approximant		w		j		

- /k, kʼ/ can be heard as fricatives [x, xʼ] when in intervocalic position.
- /n/ can be heard as [ŋ] when occurring before velar sounds.
- /ɗ/ can also have a retroflex allophone [ɖ] and can also be heard as a tap [ɾ] in intervocalic position.
- [p] and [z] only occur in loanwords.

Consonants can be short or long (with the exception of sh, p', ny, and h). When it comes to the spelling the short consonants use the letter once while the long consonants are written twice causing the similar word to have completely different meaning.

Consonant (Short vs. Long)
Short Consonant	Translation	Long Consonant	Translation
boroo	backside (of a hut)	borroo	1 particular stone of a fireplace (consisting of 3 stones)
daara	nakedness, nudity	daarraa	ashes
d'araa	lie	d'araa	to long for, to crave
maaga	to regret	maagaa	intestinal worms
obaa	act of watering cattle	obbaa	to be finished

Consonants occur single in initial position; intervocalically they occur single, double, or in a cluster of two different consonants but do not occur in word final position. Phonemically, all words end in a vowel.

=== Distribution and allophones of consonants ===
In some words there is a free alternation between b and p'. This pattern of free variation has also been observed between initial j and y in some instances.

- albaa, alp'aa 'to have diarrhea'
- kobee, kop'ee 'shoes'
- c'abana, c'ap'ana 'a girl pregnant before marriage'
- jidduu, yidduu 'between'

While the ejective voiceless palatal c' occurs in medial and initial position the voiceless palatal c only occurs in initial and medial position in loanwords.

Initial and medial distribution
Phoneme	Initial	Medial
c	capaatii 'chapati'	nyeenca 'lion'
c'	c'ia 'to jump'	hanc'aa 'to be elastic/flexible'
d	dubbii 'word, thing'	farda 'horse'
d'~∅	d'agaraa, agaraa 'small axe'	
d'~∅	d'eegee~eegee 'tail'	
d'~∅	d'uumma, uumma 'peninsula'	

Some instances of initial d' can alternate with null. Similar variation occurs in Wellegga Oromo.

=== Consonant clusters within morphemes ===
Consonant clusters have been found within l, m, n, and r. Overall, consonant clusters with l, m, n, or r as a second consonant are possible but less frequent.

Consonant clusters
		C_{1}			
		l	m	n	r
C_{2}
C_{2}	b	jilba	gomboo	—	arba
C_{2}	c	bakalca	—	k'ancaraa	k'arcaasa
C_{2}	d	jaldeesa	ogomdii	gandii	ardaa
C_{2}	d'	mald'ad'd'a	—	hand'ura	bard'adaa
C_{2}	g	galgala	gamgama	hangaafa	arga
C_{2}	k	halkini	—	bonkoo	harka
C_{2}	k'	hilk'aa	—	k'oonk'oo	hak'uuk'a
C_{2}	n	—	humna	nn	kurneesoo
C_{2}	p'	jalp'aa	kulump'aa	—	surp'up'a
C_{2}	s	—	domsoo	dansaa	farsoo

=== Vowels ===
	Front	Central	Back
Close	i iː		u uː
Mid	e eː		o oː
Open		a aː	

Vowel sounds /i, e, a, o/ can also be heard as [ɪ, ɛ, ʌ, ɔ]. Vowels can be long or short in final position, medial and initial. All words end with a short or long vowel.

Initial position contrast

- aalaa - a kind of grass
- eelee - pan
- oola - to spend the day
- ummuu - amber necklace

Medial position contrast

- fiit'aa - family/relatives
- keenna - our
- koorree - Samburu (tribe)
- fuloo - gate, entrance

Final position contrast

- garaa - belly
- beela - hunger
- daara - nakedness
- gari - somewhere

==== Short and long vowels ====
The short vowel in Boraana are i, e, a, o. All of these short vowels are pronounced with little muscular effort having a phonetically lax realization. This occurs before a double consonant or cluster, before a consonant plus final short vowel, and also before an ejective or an implosive consonant. The vowel u is excluded because it is realized as itself in all environments, therefore not changing. When a short vowel is at the end of a word it becomes voiceless. This process is practiced with words like gara (place, side) and nad'eeni (woman). Andrzejewski (1957) gave a description of voiceless vowels in Boraana: "Thus during the articulation of these sounds the tongue and lips are in the same position as during the articulation of vowels, but breath is substituted for voice". Long vowels are essentially double vowels, ii, ee, aa, oo, uu in the initial and medial position. Occasionally a [ɛɛ] will occur but there is no specification to decipher whether [ɛɛ] is an allophone of long vowel ee but most tend to assume exactly that due to lack of finality on the topic. Final position vowels are phonetically short and are realized as a vowel plus glottal stop plus voiceless vowel or as a short vowel plus voiceless vowel.

Long Vowel Examples:

- himbeeka - I know, he knows
- kurneesoo - tenth

This is also the case for Orma Oromo

Example:

- saddeecaa - eighth
- nad'eeni - woman

==== Stress ====
In the following text and descriptions stress will be indicated by []. For instance [i], [e], [a], [ii], etc. Stress functions as a property of morphemes and as a property of sentences.

===== Stress as a property of morphemes =====
In Boraana Oromo short vowel noun endings have penultimate or ultimate stress (with exception to the final phonetically voiceless vowel) depending on whether they are feminine (penultimate) or masculine (ultimate).

Examples:

- intala (f) "girl, daughter"
- d[u]kana (f) "darkness"
- h[a]nd'ura (f) "navel, umbilical cord"
- gal[a]ana (m) "river"

Exceptions occur:

- [i]bidda (m) "fire"

"Nouns ending in -ii, -ee, -oo, -uu are generally feminine." As noted before feminine nouns mostly have penultimate stress due to ending in a short vowel.

Examples:

- k'urt'[u]mmii (f) "fish"
- simp'[i]rree (f) "bird"

It's important to note that the -aa noun endings can be masculine or feminine. This is also the case for Orma and Waata Oromo.

Examples:

- ag[a]rtaa (f) "pupil of the eye"
- m[a]taam mat[a]a (m) "head"
- m[a]k'aa, mak'[a]a (m) "name"

"Nouns ending in the singulative suffixes -(e)esa, -(e)ensa, -(i)isa, -(i)ca, have stress on the first syllable."

Examples:

- b[i]neesa - "animals"
- [o]rbobiisa - "spider, crab"
- d[i]randisa - "cattle tick"

"Nouns ending in -ni have ultimate or penultimate stress in free variation. The final phonetically voiceless vowel is not counted."

Examples:

- [a]faani or af[a]ani - "mouth"
- [i]lkaani or ilk[a]ani - "teeth"

Adjectives follow the same stress patterns as nouns.

==== Fixed Stress ====
Fixed stress is found on the linker clitic, the linker clitic plus -fi, the subject marking suffixes -t[i]i and -[i]i, and also in verb inflection and derivation (middle voice imperative suffixes, negative imperative suffixes, negative past subordinate suffixes and the first syllable of a verb stem with some exceptions).

Examples:

-Linker clitic in genitive function-

(the word preceding it loses its base form stress pattern in this process)

- f[i]it'ee muk[a]a
- (f[i]it'ee m[u]ka'[a]a)
- top tree LIN=GEN (Linker clitic functioning as genitive)

"the top of the tree"

-Verb inflection-

(First syllable of a verb stem except in the case of main clause affirmative verbs and in verb forms containing a stressed suffix)

Examples
himb[e]eku	I do not know, He does not know
himb[e]enne	that I don't know, that he doesnt' know
b[e]eku	that I know, that he knows
d'[a]gai	hear

==== Stress as a property of sentences ====
With the exclusion of preverbal short final vowels, usually preverbal syllables in present and past affirmative statements have stress. Differentiation between the preverbal stress rule or the presence of a stressed linker clitic is not always possible when determining how the preverbal stress formed. For example the stress pattern of the word gabayaa:

- [a]ani y[a]a kalee b[i]llaa gabay[a]a bitad'd'e

aani yaa kalee billaa gabaya[a] bit+ad'd'+e
{I (SUBJ)} FOC yesterday knife {market (w/ preverbal stress)} buy+MIVO+1sgPAST

aani yaa kalee billaa gab[a]yaa bit+ad'd'+e
{I (SUBJ)} FOC yesterday knife {market }LIN=SCOPE buy+MIVO+1sgPAST
"Yesterday I bought a knife at the market"

== Alphabet ==
This alphabetical order is used in the Boraana English vocabulary.

Southern Oromo alphabet
Letter	Sample Word	Translation
A a	abbaa	father; owner
B b	baana	to speak, to say
C c	caacii	church
C' c'	c'aba	to break
D d	daraaraa	flower, leaves
D' d'	d'ak'aba	to reach a place, near to
E e	eesuma	maternal uncle
F f	falfalta	to say bad things, do wrong
G g	gummii	a group of people
H h	hink'irfad'd'a	to hiccup
I i	ideemtuu	traveller, guest
J j	jaalala	to love, to like
K k	kitaaba	book
K' k'	k'at'aamura	crossroad, zigzag
L l	labbaa	baby, small child
M m	maa?	what?
N n	naanaa	food, sweets
Ny ny	nyaaba	foreigner
O o	obsaa	officer
P p	pikipiki	motorbike
P' p'	--	--
R r	rifeensa	hair
S s	sookoo	market
Sh sh	shambaa	farm, garden
T t	tabad'd'a	to play, amuse one self
T' t'	t'unnalee	a kind of honey
U u	ula	clean
W w	warabeesa	hyeena
Y y	yammoo	cold, cold weather
Z z	--	--

== Morphology ==
There are many morphological processes that take place within Boraana Oromo. Consonant clusters across morpheme boundaries originate in verb forms, nouns, adjectives occasionally having two realizations due to free variation, a gap in data, or a semantic block on one of the variants. Due to these processes the input consonant differs from the output consonant.

Summary of consonant clusters morphophonemic process:

1. final consonant + t
  b + t = bt, d' + t = tt, g + t = dd
2. final consonant + n
  b + n = mn, d + n = nn, g + n =nn
3. final consonant + s
  d + s =c, d' + s = s, k' + s = ns
4. (h)[i]n- or (h)in- + initial consonant

Within Boraana Oromo there are morphophonemic changes involving vowels and glides, changes in vowels across morpheme boundaries, change of n into zero, epenthetic consonants and vowels, inversions of consonant clusters and lengthening of short vowels in a closed syllable.

=== Noun Phrase ===
A noun may be modified by a possessive, an adjective, and a demonstrative and they are also gender sensitive with the following order taking place.

NOUN - POSSESSIVE - ADJECTIVE - DEMONSTRATIVE

haad'a + tii ijoollee tana afraani ii guddoo hiyeettii
mother + SUBJ children these four LIN=GEN very poor
"The mother of these four children is very poor"

In some instances the numeral can come between the noun and adjective, between the possessive and the adjective, and between the adjective and demonstrative or at the end of the noun phrase. "Nouns, adjectives, numerals, demonstratives, personal pronouns, possessives, reflexive and reciprocal pronouns and postpositions have a "base" form in direct object position, predicate position, in temporal and locative expressions, before postpositions and suffixes and in word-by-word elicitation." There is also subject marking which varies the noun phrase categories. Adjectives and nouns are marked for subject by suffixes while demonstrative and personal pronouns have separate forms.

woraabesa + ii
hyena + SUBJ
"hyena"

Any other grammatical relations not going through the processes previously mentioned are expressed by the linker clitic. A combination of linker clitic and suffix also express grammatical relations with one relation being able to be expressed in the last element of a noun phrase.

mina ciifa aa
house chief LIN=GEN
"The house of the chief"

=== Noun ===
Isolated nouns are in the base form which is composed of the root alone or the root plus an extension (plural, singulative or derivational suffixes). It is also important to divide nouns according to their final vowels.

Nouns ending in:
a) a short vowel a or i:

mina - "house"
harka - "hand"
nad'eeni - "woman"
yaak'a - "Baobab-tree"

b) a long vowel:
niitii - "woman"
eegee - "tail"
mak'aa - "name"
aduu - "sun"

Nouns ending in a long vowel are generally feminine whilst nouns ending in short vowels are masculine. Proper names behave like nouns.

Gender
Feminine nous long vowel ending	Feminine nouns ending in -a, or -i	Masculine words long vowel ending	Masculine words short vowel ending
dubbii - Word/matter	dook'a - gem	mataa - Head	saa d'alaa - Cow
simp'irree - Bird	maala - Dewlap	gurbaa - boy	korma lukuu - Male chicken
buyyoo - Grass	nad'eeni - Women	-	dannabaa arbaa - Female elephant
aduu - Sun	lafa - Earth, ground	-	-

Numbers can be specified or unspecified by plural and singulative suffixes but more often than not nouns are unspecified by number. In a sense this means sometimes you will have no way to decifer what is one or plenty in number but the context can provide this information. There are some restrictions with masculine nouns ending in -ni and due to their plural concord must be recognized as plural such as aanani - milk, bisaani - water. Nouns with plural suffixes generally refer to counted or countable groups of items while nouns denoting animate beings can take singulative suffixes.

Summary of attested plural suffixes
1	-oollee
2	-llee
3	-oota
4	-ootee
5	-ii
6	-yyii
7	-yyee
8	-(a)ani
9	-(o)wa(a)ni
10	-oo
11	-eeni

A reduction of attested plural suffixes are -oo, -ee, -aa, -ti, -ni, -ii, -ll.

==== Singulative suffixes ====
-ttii (f) and -ca (m) are the singulative suffixes for nouns denoting animate beings, in particular ethnonyms, and are proceed by the epenthetic vowel i. Nouns with a singulative suffix lost their singulative meaning and return to a group of words unspecified for number. -sa (m) and -ttii (f) are found in limited groups of nouns that have a root ending in -ee. Original singulative meaning can be traced but in some instances they are untraced.

sidamtica - An Ethiopian man
sidamtittii - An Ethiopian woman
obbolee - brothers and sisters
obboleesa - brother(s)
obboleettii - sister(s)

Nouns are not marked for definiteness but demonstratives are used instead for this purpose and Indefiniteness is expressed by tokko "one" (namica tokko - a man). There are denominal, deverbal and de-adjectival nouns which can be derived from nouns, from adjectives and from verbs by means of suffixes.

=== Adjectives ===
Adjectives usually end in a long vowel in the base form which consist of a root or a root plus an extension. Adjectives also can be masculine or feminine agreeing in gender with the noun they modify whilst some adjectives possess no gender. One can determine the gender by looking at the adjectival ending. Masculine endings are -aa, -ca, -sa and feminine endings are -oo, -tuu, -ttii.

Gender sensitive Adjectival Endings
Masculine -aa	Masculine -ca	Masculine -sa	Feminine -oo	Feminine -tuu	Feminine -ttii
k'allaa - Narrow,thin	dullaca - old	gogeesa - dry	k'alloo - narrow, thin	baartuu - healthy	dullattii - old
huk'aa - thin, slender	gurraaca - black	dureesa - rich	huk'oo - thin, slender	diimtuu - red	gurraattii - black

=== Personal, Reflexive and Reciprocal Pronouns ===
Personal pronouns in the base form
		Singular	Plural
1st person		naa, anaa	nuu
2nd person		sii	isani
3rd person	M	isa, iisa	isaani, worra
3rd person	F	isii, ishii	isaani, worra

An example of personal pronouns in the base form:

in Direct Object Position

aani takka iisa hin+gar+ne
{I (SUBJ)} once him NEG+see+NEG.PAST
"I never met (lit. saw) him"

in Predicate position

obboleesa kiya k'aroo+ni iisa
brother my clever+SUBJ him
"He is my clever(est) brother"

Reflexive and reciprocal pronouns are invariant for person, gender and number and therefore behave like nouns with forms ufi (self) and woli (together, each other).The word Wolini itself means together.

Example:

innii daawitii keesaani ufi arge - He saw himself in the mirror
isiini d'iirsa ufii ufi d'aatuu k'abdi - She had her own husband near her
guyyoo*fi galgaloo woli argani - Guyyo and Galgalo saw each other

=== Possessives ===
Possessives can be masculine or feminine depending on head noun gender and they follow the head noun.

Possessives
SG headnoun (m)	SG heanoun (f)	PL headnoun (m)	PL headnoun (f)	Gloss
1st kiy(y)a	1st tiy(y)a	1st keenna	1st teenna	SG - my, PL - our
2nd kee, kankee	2nd tee, tantee	2nd keesani	2nd teesani	SG - your, PL your
3rd(m) isaa	3rd(f) isaa	3rd isaanii	3rd isaanii	SG - his, PL - their
3rd(f) isii	3rd(f) isii	worraa	worraa	SG her, their

anini obboleettii tiya arge - I saw my sister
guyyoo obboleesa kiya - Guyyo is my brother
obboleettiini tiya worra jirti - My sister is home

=== Verb ===
"The irreducible element of any verbal form is termed the verb root". The root conveys lexical meaning and can be extended with suffixes to the verb stem and reduplicative extensions prefixed to the verb stem. Both the simple and the extended verb stem have suffixed markers associated with categories of number, person, gender, tense and affirmation/negation.

Preverbal elements are:

(h)in-
Optional stressed clitic that immediately precedes main clause present and past affirmative verbs with emphasis on the predicate.

obboleettii-ni tiya bori (h)in-d'uf-ti
sister-SUBJ my tomorrow FOC-come-3.F.SG.PRES
"My sister will come tomorrow"

(h)in-
Unstressed obligatory clitic that immediately precedes the negative verb forms in main and subordinate clauses in present, past and imperative.

hin-d'aab-in(n)i
NEG-cook-NEG.IMP
"Don't cook (it)"

yaa (yaayuu, laa)-
This element can precede a main clause past affirmative verb.

aani yaa kalee billaa gabayaa bit-ad'd'-e
I.SUBJ FOC yesterday knife market buy-MID-1.SG.PST
"Yesterday I bought a knife at the market"

haa (aa)-
This element precedes a present subordinate affirmative verb and indicates the adhortative.

inni haa mana isa aa seen-u
he.SUBJ ADH house him LK.GEN enter-3.SG.PRES.SUBORD
"May he enter his house"

== Vocabulary ==
=== Numerals ===
"Numerals follow the noun. Cardinal and ordinal numbers do not take subject suffixes. After a noun in subject position, cardinal and ordinal numerals are in the base form."

Cardinal Numbers
Number	Southern Oromo
1	tokko, tokkoca
2	lamma
3	sadii
4	afuri
5	shani
6	jaa
7	torba
8	saddeeti
9	sagali
10	kud'aani
20	diddamii
30	soddomii
40	afurtama
50	shantama
60	jaatama
70	torbaatama
80	saddeetama
90	sagaltama
100	d'ibba (tokko)
200	d'ibba (lamma)
300	d'ibba (sadii)
400	d'ibba (afuri)

When counting above the number 10 you must attach the added number that replaces the 0 from the 1-9 numbers in order to form the complete number as shown in the graph above for numbers 100, 200, 300, 400. This rule applies for all numbers above 10.

The deicitic elements kaa (m) and taa (f) express gender in ordinal numbers. These elements are only obligatory from 20th onwards but for 1st - 19th there is dialect divergence in the use of these elements.

Ordinal Numbers
Number	Southern Oromo
1st	k'araa, kwansaa
2nd	lammeeso
3rd	sadeesoo
4th	afreesoo
5th	shaneesoo
6th	jaeesoo
7th	torbeesoo
8th	saddeesoo, saddeeteesoo
9th	sagaleesoo, kud'a(a)neesoo
10th	kurneesoo, kud'a(a)neesoo
etc.
20th	kaa diddamaa
21st	kaa diddamii tokkoo

== Bibliography ==
- Gragg (1982). Oromo Dictionary. African Studies Center, Michigan State University in cooperation with Oriental Institute, University of Chicago.
- Lewis, Herbert S. (1966). "The Origins of the Galla and Somali". The Journal of African History. 7 (1). Cambridge University Press: 27–46. doi:10.1017/S0021853700006058.
- Stroomer, Harry (1987). A comparative study or three Southern Oromo dialects in Kenya: phonology, morphology, and vocabulary. Hamburg: Buske.
- Stroomer, Harry (1995). A grammar of Boraana Oromo (Kenya): phonology, morphology, vocabularies. Kuschitische Sprachstudien. Köln: Köppe. ISBN 978-3-927620-27-8.
