= Oromoid languages =

Lowland East Cushitic branch containing Oromo and Konsoid dialects

Oromoid
- Oromo–Konsoid
- Geographic distribution: Ethiopia, Djibouti, Somalia, Kenya
- Linguistic classification: Afro-Asiatic: Cushitic; Lowland East Cushitic; Oromoid
- Subdivisions: Oromo; Konsoid

Language codes
- Glottolog: nucl1701

The Oromoid languages are a branch of Lowland East Cushitic languages that includes the most populous Cushitic language, Oromo, and the closely related Konsoid dialect cluster. A distinguishing feature of Oromoid (and Omo-Tama) languages from other lowland East Cushitic languages is a distinct paradigm for negation.

Oromo
Oromo, Eastern Oromo, Borana, Orma, Waata
Konsoid (Konso–Gidole)
Konso, Dirasha (Gidole), Bussa (Mossiya), Mashile, Turo, Gato
