= Ale language =

Afro-Asiatic language of southern Ethiopia

Ale
- Native to: Ethiopia
- Region: Ale Zone, South Ethiopia Regional State
- Native speakers: 69,000 (2007 census)
- Language family: Afro-Asiatic: Cushitic; Dullay; Ale
- Dialects: Gawwada proper; Dihina; Gergere; Gollango; Gorose; Harso
- Writing system: Ethiopic script, Latin script

Language codes
- ISO 639-3: gwd
- Glottolog: gaww1239

Ale (also known as Gawwada, Gauwada, Gawata, Kawwad'a, Kawwada) is an Afro-Asiatic language spoken in southern Ethiopia in the administratively part of the "South Ethiopia Regional State" (SERS). It is part of the Dullay dialect cluster.

== Sociolinguistics ==
Ale is a part of the Dullay dialect cluster (formerly also known as Qawko or Werizoid). There is no superordinate ethnonym, and above individual dialects the language is only known by a variety of exonyms. The name 'Dullay' was established by Amborn, Minker and Sasse (1980) and named after the river of the same name, which is known as Weyt'o in Amharic, which is one of the most salient features in the area. This is therefore an exonym, but is also officially used in Ethiopia.

The denomination of "Ale" (from /ʕale/, meaning 'upland') is a rather young denomination used in English publications and used by the today's administration of Ethiopia, and refers only to the highland varieties to the exclusion of Ts'amakko.

Dullay-speaking tribes inhabit an area that stretches from the Gardulla-Dobase Mountains south of Lake Chamo to the highlands of Hamar. Historically, the Dullay-speaking people lack an overarching term for themselves, and they do not seem to identify as an ethnic or linguistic group.

There is generally little information about the Dullay-speaking tribes before the end of the 19th century. The most significant historical event in the modern consciousness of the Dullay-speaking tribes is the conquest of their territory by the troops of Menelik II in 1897/98. Through fighting, deportation and slavery, the population was decimated to such an extent that today only 1/3 of the former population still lives in this area.

According to the 1994 census, there were 32,636 Gawwada speakers, and a total of about 90,000 people speaking Dullay variations in general. The language is not threatened with extinction.

Bilingualism and multilingualism are widespread in the Dullay language area. People often speak Amharic first, which is now the official language in Ethiopia and is spoken and used in official offices etc. Especially after the Second World War a minimum modern administration was established, and it is from these times that intense Gawwada-Amharic constant can be dated. The language contact increase in intensity after the fall of the empire. That is the reason why there is a huge amount of Amharic loans, which is probably in rise, together with literacy and the already mentioned bilingualism, because Amharic is the only language through which people have access to „modern" vocabulary within subjects such as politics, Christianity or technology. It is the language in which education is taught and in which all official organizational processes take place. Loan words from European languages (mostly English or Italian) also find their way into Gawwada through Amharic. This is also the language that is spoken the most in addition to Gawwada. Today the present constitution accords full rights to every community and language of the country: "All Ethiopian languages shall enjoy equal state recognition." Another language often spoken by the people is Konso and other Konsoid variations. In most cases, Dullay variations are not written.

The social structure revolves around clans that practice exogamy. These clans possess distinct abilities related to natural occurrences, plants, and animals. Various clans exhibit diverse powers, such as the ability to control rainfall and enhance cattle multiplication. Some clans specialize in tobacco, while others possess unique powers associated with matters of love or peace. Although clans do not exert economic influence in terms of land or activities, they play a crucial role in regulating marriages and serve as the primary social entity responsible for community reproduction and preservation. Each clan is led by both a political and a religious chief (polo-h-o).

=== Dialects ===
Within the Dullay cluster, the western and the eastern group of dialects can be opposed, the western area with Ts'amakko and the eastern part with Gawwada, which spans the two banks of Weyt'o river. Eastern dialects occupy the highlands to the east and north of Gawwada.

The name Gawwada originally comes from the village of the same name and the surrounding area that gave the language its name. Gawwada and other Ale varieties of Dullay are spoken in the mountainous regions at an altitude of around 1600–1700 metres.

There are several distinct dialect centres within the language area. For example, the 'Harso-Dobase'. However, this differs only very slightly and is often treated as a single unit. There is also the Gawwada-Gollango. There are greater differences here than with the Harso-Dobase dialects. Other Ale-Gawwada variations include Dihina, Gergere and Gorose.

Here is an example of a distinction between two variations:

Harso-Dobase	Gollango-Gawwada	Translation
paste	Pukka’te	Head
korse	saakanko	Meat
koto	mano	House
Po’-	Ran-	to fall

== Phonology ==
The phonological system consists of 22 consonants and 10 vowels. The consonants include 12 plosives, five fricatives, one affricate, one trill and three approximants. There are also seven alveolar consonants.

=== Consonants ===
Consonants of Gawwada
		Labial	Alveolar	Post-alv./ Palatal	Velar	Uvular	Pharyngeal	Glottal
Plosive/ Affricate	voiceless	p	t		k	q		ʔ
Plosive/ Affricate	implosive	ɓ	ɗ		ɠ			
Plosive/ Affricate	ejective		tʼ	tʃʼ	kʼ			
Fricative		f	s	ʃ			ʕ	h
Nasal		m	n					
Tap			ɾ					
Lateral			l					
Approximant		w		j				

Although the words usually end with a vowel, all consonants can occur at the beginning, in the middle and at the end of a word.

==== Allophony ====
1. oral, plosives:
  - /p/, a bilabial pulmonic stop, realized as:
    - [p] voiceless bilabial pulmonic stop when geminate (/pː/)
    - [b] (at least partially) voiced bilabial pulmonic stop word-initially, voiced between vowels and in clusters
    - [p̚] devoiced unreleased bilabial pulmonic stop, word-final
    - [β], rarely; voiced bilabial fricative in intervocalic position
  - /t/, an alveolar pulmonic stop realized as:
    - [t] voiceless alveolar pulmonic stop when geminate (/tː/)
    - [d] (at least partially) voiced alveolar pulmonic stop word-initially, voiced between vowels and in clusters;
  - /k/, a velar pulmonic stop, realized as:
    - [k] voiceless velar pulmonic, when geminate (/kː/)
    - [g] (at least partially) voiced velar pulmonic stop word-initially, voiced between vowels ad in clusters;
    - [k̚] devoiced unreleased velar pulmonic stop with early voice onset;
    - [gˤ]voiced velar pharyngealized stop before /i/, both simpleton and geminate
  - /q/, uvular pulmonic stop, realized as:
    - [q] voiceless uvular pulmonic stop, especially when geminate (/qː/)
    - [ɢ] (at least partially) voiced uvular pulmonic stop word-initially, voiced in clusters
    - [q̚] devoiced unreleased uvular pulmonic stop word-finally
    - [ʁ] voiced uvular fricative between vowels
    - [ʔ] rarely, voiceless laryngeal/glottal pulmonic stop between vowels
  - /ʔ/, a voiceless laryngeal/glottal pulmonic stop, realized as lengthening of a preceding vowel when postvocalic, often with accompanying glottalization ([vʔ:]);
2. glottalic, implosives :
    - [ɓ], a voiced bilabial implosive stop, realized as a glottal-bilabial coarticulation [ʔɓ] when geminate;
  - /ɗ/ a voiced postalveolar implosive stop, realized as:
    - a glottal-alveolar coarticulation [ʔɗ] before vowels other than high fronted /i/ and when geminate
    - postalveolar plain /ɖ/ before a high fronted vowel /i/;
  - /ɠ/ a voiced velar implosive stop, realized as a glottal- velar coarticulation [ʔɠ] when geminate;
3. glottalic, ejectives:
  - /t'/, an alveolar ejective stop;
  - /k'/ a voiceless velar ejective stop;
4. 4. affricate
    - The only affricate is also ejective, and its articulation place is either postalveolar or alveolo-palatal;
5. etc.

=== Vowels ===
All Dullay varieties share the typical Cushitic five-vowel system.

	Front	Central	Back
Close	i iː		u uː
Mid	e eː		o oː
Open		a aː	

- /a, aː/ may also be heard as [ɐ, ɐː]

Long vowels will be written with the doubling of the corresponding grapheme except in phonetic transcriptions (/aa/, /ee/, /ii/, /oo/, /uu/) and both [a, a:] and [ɐ, ɐ:] will be written. /a, aa/. The phonological value of length is shown by a sizable number of minimal pairs:

a		aa	
Gap-a	‚to seize, catch‘	Gaap-a	‚to be afraid‘
Harr-e	‚door‘	Haarr-e	‚donkey‘

i		ii	
Sikk-e	Trap for big animals	siikk-e	sugarcane
Tir-e	‚liver'	Tiir-e	thread

o		oo	
Qot-a	‚to dig‘	Qoot-a	‚To distribute’
qott-o	‚type of hoe'	qoot-t-o	‚share, part‘

u		uu	
qut’	‚to cut with an instrument‘	quut'	to take a kattle back to the kral in the evening’

=== Syllable structure ===
The following table defines all possible syllable structures:

σ = CV(V)(C)

CV	/pa.ko/	‚mother; language'
CVV	/yaa.ye/	‚mother‘
CVC	/Kol.le/	‚river’
CVVC	/kuur.ro/	‚speckled pigeon‘

The onset of a syllable is therefore always consonantal in Gawwada, while a coda can be represented by (rarely) a single consonant or (more usually) be null.

== Orthography ==
Ale alphabet (2012)
A a	AA aa	B b	CH ch	C’ c’	D d	E e	EE ee	F f	G g	H h	Ħ ħ	ʕ	I i
II ii	J j	K k	K’ k’	L l	M m	NY ny	O o	OO oo	P p	QH qh	R r	S s	SH sh
T t	T’ t’	U u	UU uu	W w	HX hx	Y y	’	BH bh	DH dh	Q q	Z z		

In 2020, the letters ʕ, ħ, q were replaced with q, x and the digraph gh respectively.

Qale alphabet (2020)
A a	AA aa	B b	CH ch	C’ c’	D d	E e	EE ee	F f	G g	GH gh	H h	I i	II ii
J j	K k	K’ k’	L l	M m	NY ny	O o	OO oo	P p	QH qh	R r	S s	SH sh	T t
T’ t’	U u	UU uu	W w	X x	HX hx	Y y	’	BH bh	DH dh	Q q	Z z		

== Morphosyntax ==
The Dullay variations are characterised by a very rigid construction of subject-object-verb (SOV).

Puta ʔuruur-e ʔi=ʔerak-i
{hyena man} wind-F INDV=send-PFV.3M
'The hyena man sent onwards the wind'

More often the MP Coreferential with the subject clitic is missing.

There are differences in linguistic coding between polar questions and constituent questions, although both types use the same TAM coding. When using yes/no questions, the voice goes up, as in English, for example.

mul-o šaah-i
all-M dry-PFV.3M-Q
"Did it all dry up?"

With a consonant-final word the lengthening of the final bowl is replaced by =i

ʔizzah=i
three=Q
"Three?"

Constituent questions involve a particular element, which is substituted by an interrogative word. The interrogative word may be led by a postposition.

Question words
yaha	'who'	generic interrogative pronoun for a person
moʔ-o	'what'	general interrogative pronoun for an object
ʔah-a	'where'	(genre interrogative pronoun for a place)
par-a	'when'	
mala	'how'	
meʔ	'how much/many'	

moʔ-o koɗ-ti︎
what-M do-PFV.2SG
What did you do?

== Morphology ==
=== Nouns ===
==== Numerus ====
From a morphological perspective, nouns can be inflected according to gender, number or case. If you inflect a word in the Gawwada language, you add a suffix to the word or the word stem changes as a whole. There are different types of nouns: common nouns, proper nouns (names), adjectival nouns, positional nouns and the proniminal head and personal pronouns.

The following suffixes/infixes signal that a noun is in the singular form:

- -t; -att; -itt; it; -k; -ak; -akk; -h;

The following suffixes/infixes signal that a noun is in the plural form:

- -aɗɗ; -iɗɗ; -C; -aan; -aaM; ...

==== Noun ====
With some exceptions, all nouns are in the singular form, based on the following:

-o: Masculine

-a: Also masculine, but only for a specific type of nouns, often loanwords or kinship terms.

-e: Feminine

-e: Sometimes also the plural marker.

Examples
Final vowl	Gender	Gawwada	English
-o	M	paš-o	‚field‘
-e	F	ʔamayl-e	‚handle of a cup‘
-e	PL	Minn-e	‚house‘
-a	M	ʔapiy-a	‚mothers brother‘

===== Numerus =====
From a morphological perspective, nouns can be inflected according to gender, number or case. If you inflect a word in the Gawwada language, you add a suffix to the word or the word stem changes as a whole. There are different types of nouns: common nouns, proper nouns (names), adjectival nouns, positional nouns and the proniminal head and personal pronouns.

The following suffixes/infixes signal that a noun is in the singular form:

- -t; -att; -itt; it; -k; -ak; -akk; -h;

The following suffixes/infixes signal that a noun is in the plural form:

- -aɗɗ; -iɗɗ; -C; -aan; -aaM; ...

			SING-M	polis-itt-o	'apoliceman
Polis-e	PL	,police'	SING-F	polis-its-e	,policewoman'
			PLURAL-PL	polis-aɗɗ-e	‚Many police‘

In the case of countable animates where gender holds little cultural significance, linguistic expression does not convey natural gender. Many of these nouns lack a morphological plural form and, instead, utilize a fixed singulative:

- ʔoršɑʕ-t-o (sing-M): 'rhinoceros‘

==== Verbs ====
In Gawwada, verbs are inflected for person, number, gender, aspect and mood:

There are 3 persons in the singular and plural. In the inflection, the endings for the person, gender and number are then combined. Accordingly, the subject of the sentences can be singular or plural in number, feminine or natural in gender.

Verbs in Gawwada can be described according to four different states. The first are "situations", in which the verbs assume a static, non-dynamic form. They can also be differentiated according to "events", "processes" and "actions".

Verbs can be differentiated between Unbounded und Bounded

- Bounded: Events, and Processes
- Unbounded: Situations and actions

The negation is done by the negativ Selektor „ye“.

Auch in Gawwada können Verben nach Tense, Aspect, Mood und Modality unterschieden werden. Außerdem gibt es in Gawwada die Unterscheidung der Verben in zwei Klassen. Klasse 1 und Klasse 2. Klasse 1 Verben sind Verben, die auf einen singel-consonant enden.

==== Adjectives ====
For adjectives, there is no clear-cut definition. However, they can be described as modifiers of a noun or as pronominal headings for attributives or predicates. Adjectives exhibit non-inherent gender, yet they are connected to nouns with genders. Adjectives cannot function alone within a sentence or as the head of the sentence. They also lack tense, aspect, or mood morphology but refer to the noun.

==== Numbers ====
In the numerical system, numbers function similarly to numerals and modifiers, with "one" being the exception. When it comes to the tens, the base numeral is "ten," which is then expanded by an intermediary element (=pa) and the digit that completes the number.

base numeral		+10 (hudda=pa)		× 10 (hudan-k-o-)	
1	toʔon	11	hudda=pa toʔon	10	huddan
2	lakki	12	hudda=pa lakki	20	hudan-k-o-lakki
3	ʔizzah	13	hudda=pa ʔizzah	30	hudan-k-o-ʔizzah
4	salah	14	hudda=pa salah	40	hudan-k-o-salah
5	hupin	15	hudda=pa hupin	50	hudan-k-o-hupin
6	tappi	16	hudda=pa tappi	60	hudan-k-o-tappi
7	tahhan	17	hudda=pa tahhan	70	hudan-k-o-tahhan
8	setten	18	hudda=pa setten	80	hudan-k-o-setten
9	kollan	19	hudda=pa kollan	90	hudan-k-o-kollan
10	huddan	20	hudan-k-o-lakki	100	dippa
