= Proto-Cushitic language =

Hypothetical reconstructed proto-language

Proto-Cushitic
- Reconstruction of: Cushitic languages
- Region: Northeast Africa
- Era: ca. 8000-7000 BC
- Reconstructed ancestor: Proto-Afroasiatic
- Lower-order reconstructions: Proto-East-Cushitic

Proto-Cushitic is the reconstructed proto-language common ancestor of the Cushitic language family. Its words and roots are not directly attested in any written works, but have been reconstructed through the comparative method, which finds regular similarities between languages not explained by coincidence or word-borrowing, and extrapolates ancient forms from these similarities.

There is no consensus regarding the exact location of the Proto-Cushitic homeland; Christopher Ehret hypothesizes that it may have originated in the Red Sea Hills. The Cushitic languages are a branch of the broader Afroasiatic macro-family.

== Historical settings ==
Christopher Ehret argues for a unified Proto-Cushitic language in the Red Sea Hills as far back as the Early Holocene. Based on onomastic evidence, the Medjay and the Blemmyes of northern Nubia are believed to have spoken Cushitic languages related to the modern Beja language. Less certain are hypotheses which propose that Cushitic languages were spoken by the people of the C-Group culture in northern Nubia, or the people of the Kerma culture to the south. According to Peter Behrens and Marianne Bechaus-Gerst, linguistic evidence indicate that the Kerma peoples spoke Afroasiatic languages of the Cushitic branch.

The well-known funerary autobiography inscribed in the tomb of Harkhuf (a high official during Egypt's Sixth Dynasty) describes the arrival of a pygmy or dwarf, a figure whose name or designation in Egyptian appears to have roots in Cushitic linguistic sources. Egyptian records from the reign of Djedkare Isesi onward link the Land of Punt to the trade of myrrh and pygmies. However, it is unclear if the terms for these imports are native Puntite, intermediary, or trade-based Wanderwörter. While the limited lexical evidence prevents a definitive identification of the Puntite language, it remains consistent with Cushitic and/or Ethio-Semitic origins.

== Phonology ==
A preliminary phonological reconstruction of Proto-Cushitic was proposed by Ehret (1987).

=== Consonants ===
Proto-Cushitic consonants
		Labial	Dental			Postalveolar / Palatal	Velar		Pharyngeal	Glottal
		Labial	Normal	Fricitated	Lateral	Postalveolar / Palatal	Plain	Labialized	Pharyngeal	Glottal
Stops	Voiceless	(*p)	*t	(*ts)	*tɬ ?		*k	*kʷ ?		*ʔ
Stops	Voiced	*b	*d	(*dz)	*dɮ / *tɬʼ ?		*g	*gʷ ?		
Stops	Ejective	(*pʼ)	*tʼ	*tsʼ	*dɮ / *tɬʼ ?	*tʃʼ	*kʼ	*kʼʷ ?		
Fricatives	Voiceless	*f		*s	*ɬ ?	*ʃ	*x	*xʷ ?	*ħ	*h
Fricatives	Voiced			*z			*ɣ ?	*ɣʷ ?	*ʕ	
Nasals		*m	*n				(*ŋ)	(*ŋʷ)		
Rhotic			*r							
Approximants					*l	*j		*w		

Ehret notes that in particular the affricates *ts, *dz, and the velar nasals *ŋ, *ŋʷ rely on fairly little evidence, and that *p, *pʼ are difficult to distinguish from other consonants in the comparative material; these are shown on a darker background above.

Most of the remaining consonants have exact equivalents in reconstructed Proto-East Cushitic, with the exception of those marked here with following question mark. A system given by Appleyard as "widely accepted" excludes these questioned segments, but includes *tʃ, *dʒ and a contrast of *ɗ and *tʼ. Bender tentatively supports Ehret's *ts, *dz, *ŋ and labialized velars, but in his survey does not find unambiguous etymologies for these, nor for lateral, velar and pharyngeal fricatives or any ejectives.

The following basic correspondences of obstruent consonants follow Sasse (1979), with Beja and Agaw correspondences from Ehret (1987) and Dahalo correspondences from Tosco (2000):

Proto-Cushitic (Ehret)	Beja	Proto-Agaw (Appleyard)	Proto-East Cushitic (Sasse)	Lowland East Cushitic?						H.E.C.	Dullay	Yaaku	Dahalo
Proto-Cushitic (Ehret)	Beja	Proto-Agaw (Appleyard)	Proto-East Cushitic (Sasse)	Saho–Afar	Somali	Rendille	Arbore	Oromo	Konso	H.E.C.	Dullay	Yaaku	Dahalo
*b	b	*b	*b	b	b	b	b	b	p	*b	p, b ¹	p	ɓ-, -b-
*d	d	*d	*d	d	d	d	d	d	t	*d	t, d ¹	t	ɗ-, -d̪-
*z	d-, -y-	*dz, *z	*z	d, z ²	d	j	z	d	t	*dz ²	s, z ¹	s	d̪
*t	t	*t	*t	t	t, -d-	t	t	t	t	*t	t, tʃ	t	t̪
*g	g	*g	*g	g	g	g	g	g	k	*g	k, g ¹	k	g
*k	k	*k	*k	k	k, -g-	k	k	k	k, x ³	*k	x, h ³	k, x	k
*tʼ	s	*ts	*ɗ	ɖ	ɖ	ɖ	ɗ	ɗ	ɗ	*tʼ	ɗ	ɗ	tʼ
*kʼ	k	*q	*kʼ	k, ∅	q	x	kʼ	kʼ	ʛ	*kʼ	kʼ, q	q	kʼ
*f	f	*f	*f	f	f	f	f	f	f	*f	f	p	f
*s	s	*s	*s	s	s	s	s	f, s	s	*s	s	s	s
*ʃ	ʃ	*ts	*ʃ	s	s	s	s	s	s	*ʃ	ʃ	s	?
*ħ	h	∅	*ħ	ħ	ħ	ħ	h	h, ∅	h	h	ħ	h	ħ
*h	h	∅	*h	h	h	h	h	h, ∅	h	h	∅	h	h
*ʕ	ʔ	*ʔ	*ʕ	ʕ	ʕ	ʕ	ʔ	ʔ, ∅	ʔ, ∅	ʔ	ʕ	ʔ	ʕ
*ʔ ⁴	ʔ	*ʔ	*ʔ	ʔ	ʔ	ʔ	ʔ	ʔ, ∅	ʔ, ∅	ʔ	ʔ, ∅	ʔ	ʔ

1. /b/, /d/, /g/, /z/ are preserved in Ts'amakko.
2. /z/ is preserved in northern Saho. Within Highland East Cushitic, /z/ appears in Alaba and Kambaata, /d/ in other languages.
3. *k develops in Konso to /x/ before the vowels *a, *o; in the closely related Gidole always to /h/. In Dullay, *k develops to /h/ in Harso, /x/ in Gawwada.
4. Word-initially, /ʔ/ usually does not contrast with zero.

The sonorants *m, *n, *l, *r, *j, *w normally continue unchanged in all Cushitic languages, with the exception of *j, *w > /dʒ/, /v/ in Dahalo and a merger of *l and *r in the Highland East Cushitic language Hadiyya. (Note: The result of this merger is l- word-initially, -ll- when geminate, -r- between vowels.)

Major conditional sound laws involve palatalization, especially in all Somaloid languages as well as Oromo, and several simplifications of consonant clusters.

==== Glottalized consonants ====
Ejective and implosive consonants show multifarious correspondences between the Cushitic languages, particularly in Oromo, the Konsoid languages, the Dullay languages and the Highland East Cushitic languages, and it is likely that more segments than *tʼ must be reconstructed, which have however fallen together as /ɗ/ or /ɖ/ in most Lowland East Cushitic languages.

Appleyard does not posit any glottalized consonants for Proto-Agaw, and reconstructs uvular *q, *qʷ for sound correspondences of /kʼ/, /kʼʷ/ in Bilin, respectively, with e.g. /χ/, /χʷ/ or /q/, /qʷ/ in the rest of the subfamily. Fallon (2009) argues that the Bilin value is preserved from Proto-Cushitic and that *kʼ, *kʼʷ should be reconstructed still for Proto-Agaw.

The glottalized bilabials /pʼ/, /ɓ/ are not common in Cushitic. In Oromo, /pʼ/ seems to arise from *b plus a laryngeal consonant, *ʕ or *ʔ, e.g. Oromo /ɲaːpʼa/ 'enemy' < PEC *neʕb-, akin to Saho-Afar /-nʕeb-/ 'to hate'; Oromo /supʼeː/ 'clay', Rendille /sub/ 'mud' < PEC *subʔ-. Ehret finds /pʼ/ in Dahalo as grounds to reconstruct *pʼ for Proto-South Cushitic, and finding moreover /ɓ/ in Yaaku, proposes that it occurred as a rare phoneme already in Proto-Cushitic. Most other languages show /b/. (Note: Examples of suggested Proto-Cushitic reconstructions with *pʼ include e.g. *ginpʼ- 'heel': Dahalo /gìmpʼo/, Yaaku /kimɓa/; Burunge and Alagwa /gobina/; Arbore /ginɓa/, perhaps a borrowing from pre-Yaaku? — *pʼah- or *pʼaħ- 'dikdik': Yaaku /ɓahɓah/, Beja /baha/ — *pʼuʕ- 'to revolve': Dahalo /pʼuʕʕud̪-/ 'to drill a hole', Kw'adza poʔotis- 'to dig a hole', Beja /bʔas-/ 'to turn around'.)

==== Additional consonants ====
Sasse tentatively reconstructs *x as Proto-East Cushitic based on Dullay and Yaaku, but finds correspondences elsewhere to be unclear. Ehret identifies these further with *x, *xʷ occurring in South Cushitic and Agaw, and finds in Beja reflexes as the stops /k/, /kʷ/. For corresponding voiced *ɣ, *ɣʷ in Agaw, which occur only word-medially, he proposes correspondences as Beja /g/, /gʷ/; most East Cushitic *g, but implosive /ɠ/ in Yaaku and Dullay; the voiceless fricatives *x, *xʷ in South Cushitic. A remaining word-initial correspondence of /k-/, /kʷ-/ in Beja and Agaw but again *x, *xʷ in South Cushitic is then assigned to represent Proto-Cushitic *ɣ, *ɣʷ word-initially.

The following are only proposed in detail by Ehret:

- *p is based on South Cushitic. Ehret proposes it has elsewhere, with a possible exception of Awngi, fallen together with *b.
- *ts (in nine examples) differs from *s in being preserved in Kw'adza and Dahalo, and in yielding /s/ rather than /f/ in Oromo.
- *dz (four examples) yields Agaw *ts or *tʃ, East Cushitic *s, South Cushitic *dz. One example suggests /s/ in Beja.
- *ŋ (ten examples), *ŋʷ (two examples) are again based on South Cushitic, and they merge with *n in most languages, but might be reflected as /ɲ/ in Oromo, Arbore and Yaaku in a few cases. The velar nasal *ŋ is reconstructed also for Agaw, but Ehret finds it mostly unrelated and seems to arise there mainly from Proto-Cushitic *m. (Note: Two cases are suggested by Ehret to be strong examples of retention of *ŋ in Agaw: Proto-Agaw *ŋaar 'head', compared by him with Arbore /ɲaːr/ 'forehead', Oromo /ɲaːra/ 'eyebrow', and Awngi /ŋɨrdʒi/ 'man', compared with Arbore /ɲerɗe/ 'young man'. For the first of these, Appleyard reconstructs instead Proto-Agaw *ŋata, with irregular development *t > /r/ in Awngi /ŋárí/, and compares these with East Cushitic *matħ- 'head', Beja /mat/ 'crown of the head' (not etymologized by Ehret).)

=== Vowels ===
Most Cushitic languages agree on a simple vowel system of /a/, /e/, /i/, /o/, /u/ as well as vowel length. This system is reconstructed as already Proto-Cushitic by Ehret. Bender does not find the mid vowels *e, *ee, *o, *oo to be supported by clear etymologies outside of East Cushitic.

Further instances of long vowels arise in many languages through the vocalization of the laryngeal consonants *ħ, *ʕ, *h, *ʔ and monophthongization of the combinations *ay, *ey, *aw.

A rather different vowel system appears in the Agaw languages, which is identical to the neighboring Ethiopian Semitic languages. Ehret proposes the following development:

Proto-Agaw vowel shift
Proto-Cushitic	Proto-Agaw	Proto-Cushitic	Proto-Agaw
*a	*ä [ɐ]	*aa	*a
*e	*a	*ee	*ə [ɨ]
*o	*a	*oo	*ə [ɨ]
*i	*ə [ɨ]	*ii	*i
*u	*ə [ɨ]	*uu	*u

At least the distinction between *i and *u often remains in the appearance of palatalization or labialization on adjacent consonants.

== Grammar ==
=== Personal pronouns ===
A personal pronoun system with six grammatical persons can be reconstructed, with distinct masculine and feminine forms for at least the third person singular, as well as two distinct forms: an "independent" form, normally used in the nominative case, as well as a "dependent" form, often used as an oblique stem e.g. for the accusative case. This distinction appears to be inherited already from Proto-Afro-Asiatic.

An exclusive "we" pronoun has developed in a number of East Cushitic languages, but cannot be reconstructed even for their common ancestor.

== Comparative vocabulary and reconstructed roots ==
See Proto-Cushitic reconstructions (Appendix in Wiktionary).
