= Proto-East-Cushitic language =

Reconstructed ancestor of the East Cushitic languages

Proto-East-Cushitic
- Reconstruction of: East Cushitic
- Region: Horn of Africa
- Reconstructed ancestor: Proto-Cushitic

Proto-East-Cushitic is the reconstructed proto-language common ancestor of the Eastern branch of the Cushitic language family. Its words and roots are not directly attested in any written works, but have been reconstructed through the comparative method, which finds systematic regularities between languages not explained by coincidence or word-borrowing, and extrapolates ancient forms from these similarities.

== Time depth and classification ==
A lexicostatistic study by Christopher Ehret et al. provides an estimated time depth of 6865 years for the last shared ancestor of Yaaku-Dullay and the remaining East Cushitic languages and found South Cushitic, including Dahalo, as their next-closest relatives.

== Phonology ==
=== Consonants ===
An initial reconstruction of the Proto-East-Cushitic consonants was proposed by Hans-Jürgen Sasse.

		Labial	Coronal	Post-alv./ Palatal	Velar	Pharyngeal	Glottal
Plosive	voiceless		t		k		ʔ
Plosive	voiced	b	d		g		
Plosive	glottalized		ɗ <d'>, ɗ₁ <d'₁>		k’		
Fricative	voiceless	f	s	ʃ <š>	(x?)	ħ	h
Fricative	voiced		z			ʕ	
Nasal		m	n				
Lateral			l				
Trill			r				
Glide		w		j			

=== Vowels ===
Sasse assumes a five-quality vowel system with a length distinction:

	Front	Central	Back
Close	i		u
Mid	e		o
Open		a	

== Morphology ==
=== Pronouns ===
David Appleyard reconstructs the Proto-East-Cushitic personal pronouns as follows:

		singular		plural	
		subject	oblique	subject	oblique
first person		*ʔani ~ *ʔanu	*yi ~ *yu (~ *ya?)	*nVnV ~ *ʔVn(n)V	*nV
second person		*ʔati ~ *ʔatu	*ku ~ *ki (~ possessive *ka)	*ʔatin ~ *ʔatun	*kun ~ *kin
third person	m.	*ʔus-uu	*ʔus-a(a) ~ *ʔis-a(a)	*ʔusun ~ *ʔišin	
third person	f.	*ʔiš-ii	*ʔiš-ii ~ *ʔiš-ee	*ʔusun ~ *ʔišin	

Hans-Jürgen Sasse reconstructs a demonstrative paradigm that inflects for gender and case, contrasting a subject case and an absolute:

	masculine	feminine
absolute	*ka	*ta
subject	*ku	*ti

=== Nouns ===
East Cushitic is mostly characterized by marked nominative alignment. Sasse reconstructs the Proto-East-Cushitic paradigms for nouns ending in a short vowel as follows:

	masculine	feminine
absolute	*-a	*-a
subject	*-u/i	*-a

=== Verbs ===
==== Derivation ====
Richard Hayward reconstructs the following derivational affixes for Proto-East-Cushitic:

- causative prefixes *s-, *y-, *ys-;
- causative suffixes *-s, *-is, *-siis, and *-isiis;
- a middle prefix *t-;
- a middle suffix *-at/ad'/an-;
- a middle causative prefix *ss-;
- a middle causative suffix *-(s)it-, as well as other combinations of the middle and causative suffixes;
- detransitive prefixes *m-, *mm-, and *nt-;
- a detransitive suffix *-am-; and
- inchoative suffixes *-aaw- and *-oow-.

==== Inflection ====
Proto-East-Cushitic is reconstructed with two types of verbal inflection. A minority of verbs primarily marks subject agreement through prefixes, as in some other branches of Afroasiatic. The majority uses the typically Cushitic suffix conjugation. Appleyard reconstructs the Proto-Lowland-East-Cushitic suffixed subject markers as follows:

	present	past
1sg.	*-aa	*-ay
2sg.	*-taa	*-tay
3sg.m.	*-aa	*-ay
3sg.f.	*-taa	*-tay
1pl.	*-naa	*-nay
2pl.	*-taani	*-teeni
3pl.	*-aani	*-eeni

For prefix-conjugated verbs, Sasse reconstructs four different conjugational classes, which he compares to various kinds of strong and weak roots in Semitic (C stands for a radical consonant, U stands for *i or *u):

class	present/subjunctive	past
CCVC type	*y-a-CCaC-, *y-a-CCUC-	*y-U-CCUC-
CVC type	*y-a-CaC-	*y-U-CUC-
CVVC type	*y-a-CaaC-	*y-U-CUUC-
CCi type	*y-U-Ca(a)Caa	*y-U-CCi(i)

Several branches of East Cushitic also attest a stative conjugation that may be related to those of Semitic, Berber, and Ancient Egyptian, reconstructed by Sasse as follows:

1sg.	*-i-yu
2sg.	*-i-tu
3sg.	*-a
1pl.	*-i-nu
2pl.	*-i-tin
3pl.	?

Giorgio Banti has proposed a modification to this reconstruction, suggesting that the 1sg. form may have alternated with *-i-yi, that the third person (singular and plural) should be reconstructed without an ending, and that this conjugation is best compared to the Ancient Egyptian sḏm.f, not the stative.
