= Dimbago =

The Dimbago, also known as Bet Dimbago, are an ethnic group inhabiting Eritrea.

== Overview ==
The Dimbago are one of the seven holy families of the Saho people acknowledged for having spread the Islamic faith.

Group members speak several languages depending on location. Besides Saho, some also speak Tigre and/or Arabic.

The Dimbago mainly inhabit Massawa, Madagia in Uckli Guzai, and Barka. Dimbago men have traditionally served as religious leaders and medicine men in the various regions where the group resides. The last of the medicine men to combine traditional shamanic methods with western medicine in his practices was Alhaj Salah Dimbago (1920-1993), born near Massawa and died in Benghazi, trained by the Italians. His son Dr. Ahmad Alhaj completely westernized in his medicine practice, attaining the highest degrees in the field (MRCP and FRCP). he currently practices in Dubai, UAE. Most of the tribesmen, including the younger Salah's have left the plains of Eritrea to settle down in more prosperous parts of the world, such as the Persian Gulf, Europe and Canada where Adam Salah settled and started a new branch following the tradition of migration long started by his ancestors.
