= Hadu people =

The Hadu are an Afar ethnic group native to the Horn of Africa. They primarily reside in the northeastern regions of Ethiopia, Eritrea, and Djibouti, where they co-exist with other clans including the Arebta, the Dahimela, the Damohita, the Hadarmo, and the Seka.

== Language ==
The Hadu people primarily speak Afar-Af. They belong to the Eastern Cushitic branch of the Afro-Asiatic language family, and Saho, a closely related language.

== Culture ==
Their culture includes traditional music, lale, keke, horra, and oral storytelling. Their cultural expressions often reflect their connection to their ancestral heritage and their land.

The Hadu are largely nomadic. They practise pastoralism and traditionally rely on livestock for sustenance. In recent years, environmental degradation has driven some to turn to a more sedentary lifestyle.

== Social structure ==
The Hadu, like other Afar groups, are organized into a clan-based social structure. One of the 6 dardars in Afar society is one of (kilbatti dardar) Northern darda, hadu, tarua, and hasoba dardar (Sultaan).

== Religion ==
The Hadu people are predominantly Muslim and have historical ties with Islam through local Muslim polities. The Hadu mainly follow the Shafi'i school of Sunni Islam. Traditional religious practices are often integrated with Islamic customs in rituals.
