= Saho people =

Cushitic ethnic group native to the Horn of Africa

Saho
ሳሆ

Total population
- 250,000–650,000 (2015)

Regions with significant populations
- Eritrea: 250,000–650,000 (2015)
- Ethiopia: 25,471 (2007)

Languages
- Saho

Religion
- Sunni Islam

Related ethnic groups
- Irobs; Afar; Somalis; Cushitic peoples

The Saho are a Cushitic ethnic group who are one of the nine official ethnic groups of Eritrea. A few Saho also live in Ethiopia. They speak Saho as a mother tongue.

== History ==
The Saho were originally a northern extension of the Afar who moved along the Gulf of Zula and settled into the eastern foothills of Akele Guzai and Semhar sometime between the 9th and 12th centuries. The first mention of the Sahos comes from the Royal Chronicle of Emperor Susenyos I, which notes a "country of the Sahos" existing on the "confines of the Ethiopian kingdom".

During the 19th century, the Sahos were described as being cattle herders who controlled all the caravan routes from Tigray to the ports of Massawa and Hirgogo. They did not tolerate being treated unfairly by the Naib of Massawa or the Egyptian appointed governor and regularly refused to pay tribute to the authorities at Massawa. In 1848, the British explorer Walter Plowden described the Sahos as being "the most expert of fleecers" in all of Abyssinia.

In 1933, the Italian colonial authorities organized all the Sahos into five tribes (leaving out the Irob in Agame) under government appointed chiefs, using a divide and rule policy against the Saho to facilitate their submission under Italian rule. An "Eritrean mission" led by A. Mochi and L. Loria visited the Saho speaking areas of Italian Eritrea and collected an abundance of Saho cultural objects, many of which were displayed at the Museo di Storia Naturale di Firenze.

During the Eritrean War of Independence, the Sahos suffered from Ethiopian military raids, which forced many of them to flee to Sudan. Unlike other Muslim ethnicities in Eritrea, the Sahos were well represented in the Eritrean People's Liberation Front (EPLF). After Eritrean independence, many Saho fighters were rewarded positions in the Eritrean government, among the most prominent were Mahmoud Ahmed Sherifo, Osman Saleh and Mohammed Omar Suba. Many Saho also hold high ranking posts in the Eritrean Army and the Eritrean police.

== Society ==
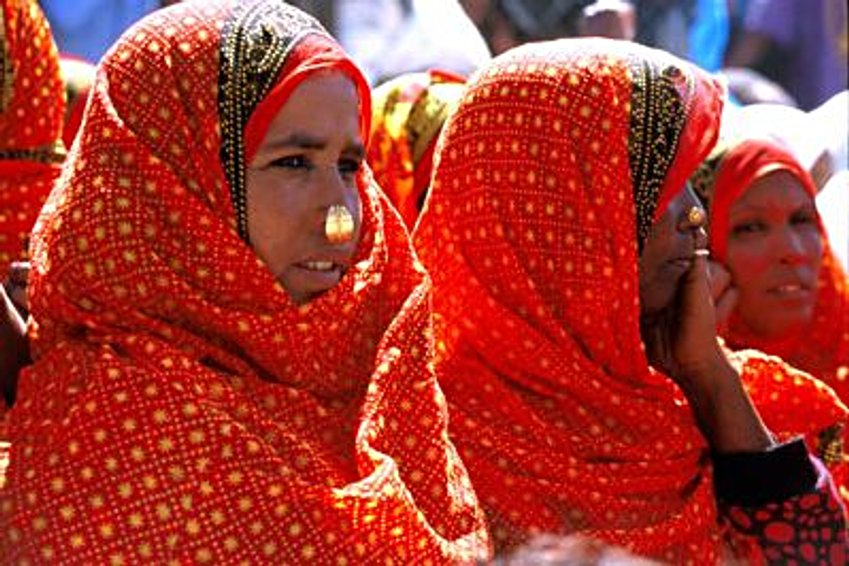
Saho women

According to Abdulkader Saleh Mohammad, many of the Saho, like the Afar), have a primordial view of their own ethnicity and claim descent from Arabian immigrants; this in turn allows for an identification with the family of Muhammad, and for an association of their history with that of the Near East. The societal structure is patrilineal and hierarchic, with society vertically organized in tribes and clans and families. The tribe (meela, kisho, or qabila) is organized into sub-tribes (gaysha, harak, or 'are) or clans (dik or 'are), but these two concepts are not always clearly distinguished, which are the most important strata because they indicate an individual's "personal descent or origin". Family descent is memorized going back at least 30 or 40 generations. Also memorized and narrated are laws and customs, and consanguinity plays an important role in these traditions, indicating again the primordial quality of tribal and ethnic identity. The descendants of Islamic scholars are referred to as the al-Kabiri.

Most Saho are pastoralists who also engage in some agriculture but a few groups are settled farmers.

Regarding the customary law of the Saho, when there is an issue the Saho tend to call for a meeting or conference which they call rahbe. In such a meeting the Saho people discuss how to solve issues related to water, pasture or land, clan disputes and how to alleviate these problems. This is also discussed with neighboring tribes or ethnic groups and sub-clans to reach a consensus. A skilled representative is chosen for this meeting, this representative is called a madarre. A madarre brings forth arguments to his audience and sub-clans or tribes who are involved and tries to win them over. This is discussed with clan or tribal wise men or elders, ukal. On smaller scale conflicts between 2 individuals, one of the 2 takes their grievances to the ukal, they in turn appoint shimagale or mediators for the dispute.

Among the Saho there is a sub-clan called the Gadafur. The Gadafur are an independent sub-clan affiliated with the Minifere tribes and are believed to be originally from the tribe of Gadabuursi.

== Demographics ==
The total population of the Saho is unclear due to conflicting figures. However, most Saho reside in Eritrea. According to a 2015 estimate, the total population ranges anywhere from 250,000 to 650,000. According to Saho advocacy groups, they estimated that the population of Sahos in Eritrea was about 206,000 in 2016. The Saho represent about 4% of the population of Eritrea as of 2021. Within Eritrea, the Saho primarily reside in the Southern and Northern Red Sea regions. Some Saho also live in Ethiopia, where a 2012 estimate placed their population at 37,000. The Saho people speak the Saho language as a mother tongue. It belongs to the Saho-Afar dialect cluster of the Lowland East Cushitic languages, which are part of the Cushitic branch of the Afroasiatic family and is closely related to Afar.

== Religion ==
The Saho are predominantly Sunni Muslim. Majority of the Saho had adopted Islam by the 13th century due to the growing influence of religious mystics and traders from the Arabian peninsula. Many Saho people have mingled with other Muslim tribes such as the Jeberti (Tigrinya-speaking Muslims) and the Tigre and have as a result adopted those tribes languages. Many Saho are members of the Khatmiyya Sufi order, which became dominant in the region around the 19th century. A few Christians, who are also known as the Irob, live in the Tigray region of Ethiopia and the Debub Region of Eritrea.

== Notable Saho ==
- Ibrahim Mukhtar, Grand Mufti of Eritrea
- Osman Saleh Sabbe, Eritrean revolutionary
- Ahmed Mohammed Nasser, Chairman of the Eritrean Liberation Front
- Osman Saleh, Eritrean Foreign Minister
- Mahmoud Ahmed Sherifo, Minister of Foreign Affairs
- Ibrahim Omer, New Zealand MP
