= East Cushitic languages =

Branch of Cushitic native to the Horn of Africa and Kenya

East Cushitic
- Geographic distribution: Horn of Africa, East Africa
- Linguistic classification: Afro-Asiatic: Cushitic; East Cushitic
- Proto-language: Proto-East-Cushitic
- Subdivisions: Highland East; Lowland East; ? Dahalo; ? Yaaku-Dullay; ? Baz

Language codes
- Glottolog: east2699

The East Cushitic languages are a branch of Cushitic within the Afroasiatic phylum. Prominent East Cushitic languages include Afar, Oromo, and Somali. Divided into two main sub-branches, the unity of East Cushitic has been contested: linguist Robert Hetzron suggested combining the Sidama like Highland East Cushitic languages with Agaw languages into a "Highland Cushitic" branch, however, other scholars follow Martino Mario Moreno in seeing Highland and Lowland as two branches of East Cushitic.

== Classification ==
Clearly distinct subgroups within East Cushitic are Highland East Cushitic (including Sidama and Hadiyya), Oromoid (including Oromo and Konso), Omo-Tana (including Somali and Arbore), Dullay, and Saho-Afar. A number of tree models of how these relate to each other have been put forward. Highland East Cushitic is commonly seen as a primary branch, also in the "traditional" or "classical" view which groups Yaaku with Dullay and groups the rest as Lowland East Cushitic. With the addition of Dahalo, formerly considered to belong to South Cushitic, this classification is also followed by David Appleyard:

- East Cushitic
  - Highland
  - Yaaku-Dullay
  - Lowland
    - Omo–Tana
    - Oromoid
    - Saho–Afar
  - Dahalo

An influential alternative classification was put forward by Mauro Tosco. His 2000 proposal groups Yaaku and Dullay with part of Lowland and replaces them with all of South Cushitic as the fourth daughter branch of East Cushitic:

- East Cushitic
  - Highland
  - Lowland
    - Southern
      - Nuclear
        - Omo–Tana
        - Oromoid
      - Transversal
        - Dullay
        - Yaaku
    - Saho–Afar
  - Dahalo
  - South Cushitic

Tosco's revised 2020 classification leaves the disputed Dahalo and South Cushitic languages out of consideration, leaving a binary split between Highland and Lowland (although he states that this is negatively defined and could also be seen as separate branches of East Cushitic):

- East Cushitic
  - Highland
  - Lowland
    - Southern
      - Nuclear
        - Omo–Tana
        - Oromoid
      - Peripheral (?)
        - Dullay
        - Yaaku
    - Saho–Afar

Finally, Lionel Bender's posthumous 2019 classification also places Dahalo outside East Cushitic, making it a primary branch of Cushitic as also suggested by Kießling and Mous. Yaaku is not listed, being placed within Arboroid. Afar–Saho is removed from Lowland East Cushitic; since they are the most 'lowland' of the Cushitic languages, Bender calls the remnant 'core' East Cushitic.

- East Cushitic
  - Afar–Saho
  - Highland East Cushitic
  - Lowland East Cushitic ('core' East Cushitic)
    - Dullay
    - SAOK
      - Eastern Omo–Tana (Somaloid)
      - Western Omo–Tana (Arboroid)
      - Oromoid (Oromo–Konsoid)

== Morphology ==
=== Noun ===
Many East Cushitic languages are characterized by marked nominative alignment. Nouns distinguish a nominative and accusative case, but the nominative is only used to mark the subject. Hence, the nominative is commonly referred to as the subject case in Cushitic linguistics, while the accusative is called the absolute case. Besides marking the direct object, the absolute case is used in many other contexts, as well as when case distinctions are neutralized. It is also used as the citation form of the noun, and as the non-verbal predicate (examples from Borana:

- nam-a 'a man' (vs. subject case nam-í)
- kunin nam-a 'this is a man'

Most East Cushitic languages have a gender distinction. Nouns are inherently masculine or feminine or, in some languages, a third gender interpreted by linguists as either neuter or a typologically rare "plural gender". Another cross-linguistically rare feature of East Cushitic gender is that the singular and plural of the same lexeme often differ in gender, as in Somali, where most masculine singulars have a feminine plural, and vice versa.

=== Verb ===
As in most other branches of Cushitic, the majority of East Cushitic verbs mark their subject agreement and tense–aspect–mood information with suffixes. A typically East Cushitic feature is the threefold distinction between imperfective, perfective, and jussive forms, marked by a changing vowel. This is most clearly seen in Lowland languages like Oromo, but also recognizable in Highland languages like Sidamo:

Tense–aspect–mood and subject agreement marking in Oromo and Sidamo
	Imperfective		Perfective		Jussive	
	Oromo	Sidamo	Oromo	Sidamo	Oromo	Sidamo
1sg.	deem-a	it-eemmo	deem-e	it-ummo	deem-u	it-o[ni]
2sg.	deem-ta	it-atto	deem-te	it-itto	deem-tu	-
3sg.m.	deem-a	it-anno	deem-e	it-í	deem-u	it-o[na]
3sg.f.	deem-ti	it-tanno	deem-te	it-tú	deem-tu	it-to[na]

== Syntax ==
Most East Cushitic languages obligatorily mark focus. Sasse cites the following examples from Gidole:

- he-tóóyé 'he looked'
- ínno he-tóóyé 'he looked at us'
- inno tóóyé 'he looked at us'

== Lexicon ==
The East Cushitic languages share a sizeable amount of basic vocabulary inherited from Proto-East-Cushitic, such as the following:

Examples of shared East Cushitic vocabulary items
Meaning	Somali (Omo-Tana)	Oromo (Oromoid)	Burji (Highland)	Yaaku	Saho	Proto-East-Cushitic
'bone'	laf	laf-ee	-	-	laf-a	*laf-
'cough'	qufac-	qufa-	k'uf-ey-	qopɛʔɛ-	ufuʕ-	*k'uf(a)ʕ-
'elephant'	arb-e	arb-a	arb-a	arap-e 'carnivorous animal'	-	*ʔarb-
'give birth'	dhal-	dhal-	ɗal-	del-	ɖal-	*ɗal-
'head'	madax	mataa	-	miteh	-	*matħ-
'heart'	wadne	onn-ee	-	-	wazana, wadana	*wazn-
'navel'	xundhur	handhuur-a	hanʔur-a	hender-o	-	*ħanɗur-/*ħunɗur-
'pus'	malax	mala-a	mal-a	mileh	malaħ	*malħ-
'right-hand (side)'	midig	mirg-a	(mirg-a) (Note: Oromo loanword.)	-	midg-a, mizg-a	*mizg-
'wake up, get up'	kac-	ka'-	kaʔ-	kɛʔɛ 'plant, put up'	-	*kaʕ
