= Proto-Afroasiatic language =

Reconstructed ancestor of the Afroasiatic language family

Proto-Afroasiatic
- Proto-Hamito-Semitic, Proto-Semito-Hamitic, Proto-Afrasian
- Reconstruction of: Afroasiatic languages
- Region: See proto-Afroasiatic homeland
- Era: c. 16,000–10,000 BC
- Lower-order reconstructions: Proto-Berber; Proto-Chadic; Proto-Cushitic; Proto-Omotic; Proto-Semitic; Archaic Egyptian

Proto-Afroasiatic (PAA), also known as Proto-Hamito-Semitic, Proto-Semito-Hamitic, and Proto-Afrasian, is the hypothetical proto-language from which all modern Afroasiatic languages are descended. Though estimates vary widely, scholars believe it was spoken as a single language around 12,000 to 18,000 years ago, that is, between 16,000 and 10,000 BC. Although no consensus exists as to the location of the Proto-Afroasiatic homeland, the putative homeland of its speakers, the majority of scholars agree that it was located within West Asia or Northeast Africa.

The linguistic reconstruction of Proto-Afroasiatic is problematic and has not progressed to the degree found in Indo-European linguistics. The immense amount of time over which the branches have been separated, coupled with the wide gap between the attestations of the original branches (from the 3rd millennium BC for the Egyptian and Semitic languages, to as recently as the 19th and 20th centuries for many Chadic, Cushitic, and Omotic languages) mean that determining consistent sound correspondences has not yet been possible. In addition to more traditional proposed consonant correspondences, there is also a divergent proposal that has become popular among Egyptologists; there is no agreement about PAA's vowels, the existence of tone, or its syllable structure. At the same time, scholars disagree as to whether and to what extent the classical Semitic languages of Western Asia are a conservative, faithful representation of PAA morphology. This is particularly important for the question of whether the lexical roots in the language were originally mostly biradical or triradical, that is, whether they originally had two or three consonants. It also plays into the question of the degree to which Proto-Afroasiatic had root-and-pattern morphology, as most fully displayed in the Semitic, Egyptian, and to some degree Cushitic branches.

Nonetheless, there are some items of agreement and reconstructed vocabulary. Most scholars agree that Proto-Afroasiatic nouns had grammatical gender, at least two and possibly three grammatical numbers (singular, plural, and possibly dual), as well as a case system with at least two cases. Proto-Afroasiatic may have had marked nominative or ergative-absolutive alignment. A deverbal derivational prefix *mV- is also widely reconstructed. While there is disagreement about the forms of the PAA personal pronouns, there is agreement that there were independent and "bound" (unstressed, clitic) forms. There is also agreement that a widespread demonstrative pattern of n = masculine and plural, t= feminine goes back to PAA, as well as about the existence of an interrogative pronoun *mV, which may not have distinguished animacy. There is some agreement that the PAA verb had two or possibly three basic forms, though there is disagreement about what those forms were and what tenses, aspects, or moods they expressed. There is also widespread agreement that there were possibly two sets of conjugational affixes (prefixes and suffixes) used for different purposes. Additionally, the importance of verbal gemination and reduplication and the existence of three derivational affixes, especially of a causative -*s-, are commonly reconstructed. A numeral system cannot be reconstructed, although numerous PAA numerals and cognate sets from 1 to 9 have been proposed.

== Dating ==
There is no consensus as to when Proto-Afroasiatic was spoken. The absolute latest date for when Proto-Afroasiatic could have been extant is c. 4000 BC, after which Egyptian and the Semitic languages are firmly attested. However, in all likelihood these languages began to diverge well before this hard boundary. The estimations offered by scholars as to when Proto-Afroasiatic was spoken vary widely, ranging from 18,000 BC to 8,000 BC. An estimate at the youngest end of this range still makes Afroasiatic the oldest proven language family. Contrasting proposals of an early emergence, Tom Güldemann has argued that less time may have been required for the divergence than is usually assumed, as it is possible for a language to rapidly restructure due to areal contact, with the evolution of Chadic (and likely also Omotic) serving as pertinent examples.

== Problems of reconstruction ==
At present, there is no commonly accepted reconstruction of Afroasiatic morphology, grammar, syntax, or phonology. Because of the great amount of time since Afroasiatic split into branches, there are limits to what scholars can reconstruct. Cognates tend to disappear from related languages over time. There are currently not many widely accepted Afroasiatic cognates, and it is difficult to derive sound correspondence rules from a small number of examples. The most convincing cognates in Afroasiatic often have the same or very similar consonants but very different vowels, a fact which has not yet been explained. Additionally, it is not always clear which words are cognates, as some proposed cognates may be chance resemblances. Moreover, at least some cognates are likely to have been altered irregularly due to analogical change, making them harder to recognize. As words change meaning over time, the question of which words might have originally meant the same thing is often difficult to answer. As a result, Robert Ratcliffe suggests that Proto-Afroasiatic may never be reconstructed in the same way that Proto-Indo-European has been.

The current state of reconstruction is also hindered by the fact that the Egyptian and Semitic branches of Afroasiatic are attested as early as 3000 BC, while the languages of the Berber, Chadic, Cushitic, and Omotic branches are only attested much later, sometimes in the 20th century. The long history of scholarship of the Semitic languages compared to other branches is another obstacle in reconstructing Proto-Afroasiatic; typical features of Semitic have often been projected back to the proto-language, despite their cross-linguistic rarity and lack of correspondences in other branches. Like cognates, shared morphological features tend to disappear over time, as can be demonstrated within Afroasiatic by comparing Old Egyptian (2600–2000 BC) with Coptic (after 200 AD). Yet it is also possible for forms closer to PAA to be preserved in languages recorded later, while languages recorded earlier may have forms that diverge more from PAA. In order to provide a more accurate reconstruction of Afroasiatic, it will be necessary to first reconstruct the proto-forms of the individual branches, a task which has proven difficult. As of 2023, there is only the beginning of a consensus on the reconstruction of Proto-Semitic, and no widely accepted reconstruction of any of the other branches' proto-forms. Current attempts at reconstructing Afroasiatic often rely on comparing individual words or features in the daughter languages, which leads to results that are not convincing to many scholars.

== Phonology ==
=== Consonants ===
There is currently no consensus on the consonant phonemes of Afroasiatic or on their correspondences in the individual daughter languages. Most reconstructions agree that PAA had three series of obstruents (plosives, fricatives, and affricates) and that the continuants were all voiceless. There is also general agreement that obstruents were organized in triads of voiceless, voiced, and "emphatic" (possibly glottalized) consonants, and that PAA included pharyngeal and laryngeal consonants. Disagreement exists about whether there were labialized velar consonants.

Several Afroasiatic languages have large consonant inventories, and it is likely that this is inherited from proto-Afroasiatic. Vladimir Orel and Olga Stolbova (1995) reconstruct 32 consonant phonemes, while Christopher Ehret reconstructs 42. Of these, twelve in both reconstructions rely on the same sound correspondences, while an additional eighteen rely on more or less the same sound correspondences.

Consonant phonemes reconstructed from compatible sets of sound correspondences in Ehret (1995) and Orel and Stolbova (1995), according to Ratcliffe 2012
Type		Bilabial	Labiodental	Dental/Alveolar	Post-Alveolar	Palatal	Velar		Pharyngeal	Glottal
Type		Bilabial	Labiodental	Dental/Alveolar	Post-Alveolar	Palatal	Plain	Labialised	Pharyngeal	Glottal
Nasal		m		n		(ɲ) (Note: Items in parentheses are only found in Ehret but are argued to be compatible with Orel and Stolbova's reconstructions by Ratcliffe.)	(ŋ)	(ŋʷ)		
Plosive	E						kʼ	(kʷʼ)		
Plosive	V-	p		t			k	(kʷ)		ʔ
Plosive	V+	b		d			g	gʷ		
Trill				r						
Fricative	V-		f	s					ħ	h
Fricative	V+								ʕ	
Affricate					t͡ʃ					
Lateral Fricative/Lateral Affricate				ɬ/t͡ɬ (Note: On the basis of the same consonant correspondences, ɬ is reconstructed by Ehret, while tɬ is reconstructed by Orel and Stolbova.)						
Approximant						j		w		
Lateral Approximant				l						

Both reconstructions also include a number of other consonants. While some of these are the same, they rely on correspondences in the daughter languages which cannot be reconciled. For instance, although both Ehret and Orel and Stolbova reconstruct *tʼ, Ehret gives its Egyptian correspondence as s, while Orel and Stolbova give it as d and t; and though both reconstruct PAA *tlʼ, Ehret gives its Arabic correspondence as ṣ, while Orel and Stolbova give it as ḍ. Additionally, Ehret has reconstructed 11 consonants not found in Orel and Stolbova, while Orel and Stolbova have reconstructed 2 not found in Ehret. The additional consonants are:

- Ehret: pʼ, ʃ, ts, z, dz, tʃ, dʒ, tʼ, sʼ, tlʼ, dɮ, ɣ⁽ʷ⁾, x⁽ʷ⁾
- Orel and Stolbova: ts, dz, tsʼ, tʃ, dʒ, tʼ, ɬ, tɬʼ, ʁ, χ, q, qʼ

An earlier, larger reconstruction from 1992 by Orel, Stolbova and other collaborators from the Moscow School of Comparative Linguistics including Igor Diakonoff and Alexander Militarev includes also *pʼ, *tɬ, *ʃ, *kx⁽ʷ⁾, *gɣ⁽ʷ⁾, *kxʼ⁽ʷ⁾, *x⁽ʷ⁾.

Taking Ehret's labialized velars as equivalent to Orel and Stolbova's non-labialized set, and taking Ehret's extra nasals as equivalent to Orel and Stolbova's <n>, the two reconstructions mostly agree on the following correspondences between the different branches of Afroasiatic:

Consonant correspondences in Afroasiatic compatible between the reconstructions of Ehret (1995) and Orel and Stolbova (1995)
Proto-Afroasiatic		Proto-Semitic	Egyptian	Proto-Berber (Note: Ehret does not include Berber in his reconstruction.)	Proto-Chadic	Proto-Cushitic	Proto-Omotic
Ehret 1995	Orel & Stolbova 1995	Proto-Semitic	Egyptian	Proto-Berber	Proto-Chadic	Proto-Cushitic	Proto-Omotic
*b	*b	*b	b	*b	*b	*b	*b
*p	*p	*p	p	*f	*p	*p	*p
*f	*f	*p	f	*f	*f	*f	E: *p O/S: *p/*f
*d	*d	*d	d	*d	*d	*d	*d
*t	*t	*t	t	*t	*t	*t	*t
*g	*g	*g	g [O/S: also ṯ, ḏ]	*g	*g	*g	*g
*k	*k	*k	k [O/S: also ṯ, ḏ]	*k	*k	*k	*k
*k'	*ḳ [kʼ]	*k'	q [O/S: also ṯ, ḏ]	*k'	*k'	*k'	*k'
*s	*s	*š [ʃ]	s	*s	*s (E: *s3)	*s (O/E: also *š)	*s (O/S: also *š)
*ɬ	*ĉ [tɬ]	*ŝ [ɬ]	š	*c [ts]	E: *ɬ O/S: *ĉ [tɬ]	E: *ɬ O/S: *s	E: *l O/S: *š
*ʔ	*ʾ [ʔ]	*ʔ (O/S: also *ʕ)	ꜣ [ʔ] (O/S: also *l)	*ʔ	*ʔ (E: also 0)	*ʔ	*ʔ (E: also 0)
*ḥ [ħ]	*ḥ [ħ]	*ḥ [ħ]	E: ḥ O/S: h	*ḥ	E: *h O/S: *ḥ	*ḥ (O/S: also h)	E: *h1, 0 O/S: *h
*ʕ	*ʿ [ʕ]	*ʿ [ʕ]	ꜥ	*ʔ, *h	E: *ʔ, 0 O/S: *ʕ, *ʔ	E: *ʕ O/S: *ʕ, *ʔ, *h	*ʔ (E: also 0)
*h	*h	*h	h	*h	*h	*h	*h (E: *h1)
*l	*l	*l	E: n O/S: j, n, r	*l	*l	*l	*l
*r	*r	*r	E: r O/S: j, n, r	*r	*r	*r	*r
*m	*m	*m	m	*m	*m	*m	*m
*n	*n	*n	n	*n	*n	*n	*n
*w	*w	*w	w	*w	*w	*w	*w
*y [j]	*y [j]	*y	j, y	*y	*y	*y	*y

==== Neuere Komparatistik ====
Additionally, there is another proposal for the sound correspondences between – and phonetic values of – Egyptian and Semitic consonants. This second theory is known as neuere Komparatistik and was first proposed by Semiticist Otto Rössler on the basis of consonant incompatibilities. In particular, Rössler argued that, since the hieroglyph conventionally transcribed as <ʿ> and described as *ʕ never co-occurs with a dental consonant but does co-occur with other pharyngeal consonants, it must itself have originally been a dental *d in Proto-Afroasiatic, which later became *ʕ in Egyptian. Rössler's ideas have come to dominate the field of Egyptology without, however, achieving general acceptance. Orin Gensler argues that Rössler's sound change is typologically extremely unlikely, though still possible, while many of the etymologies proposed in support of the theory have been attacked by Gábor Takács. The most important sound correspondences in the neuere Komparatistik that differ from the traditional understanding are:

Proposed radically different Egyptian-Semitic consonant correspondences by Rössler
Egyptian	ꜣ	j, r	ʿ	f	z	d	ḏ
Semitic	*ʔ, *d	*g, *ɣ, *ʕ	*d, *ḏ, *z, *ḏ̣	*b	*z, *ḏ, *ṯ	*ṣ, *ḏ̣	*ṯ̣, *ʕ, *ḳ

=== Vowels ===
Reconstructed PAA vocabulary items demonstrating different reconstructed vowels, according to Levin 2003
Item	Diakonoff et al. 1987 (Note: i̭=IPA [j], <ṷ> = IPA [w], V = vowel of unknown quality.)	Orel and Stolbova 1995	Ehret 1995 (Note: Two of the same vowel in a row indicates a long vowel. A caron ˇ over a vowel indicates rising tone, and a circumflex ^ over a vowel indicates falling tone.)
'blood'	*dṃ	*dam-	*dîm-/*dâm-
'build'	*bVn	*ben-	*-bĭn-
'fly'	*pi̭r	*pir-	*-pîr-
'hill/heap'	*tṷl	*tül-	*-tŭul-

Attempts to reconstruct the vocalic system of Proto-Afroasiatic vary considerably. While there is no consensus, many scholars prefer to reconstruct a simple three vowel system with long and short *a, *i, and *u. Some of the difficulty in reconstruction is likely related to the use of vowel changes known as apophony (or "ablaut") in the "root-and-pattern" system found in various Afroasiatic languages. In addition to apophony, some modern AA languages display vowel changes referred to as umlaut.

Igor Diakonoff, Viktor Porkhomovksy and Olga Stolbova proposed in 1987 that Proto-Afroasiatic had a two vowel system of *a and *ə, with the latter realized as [i] or [u] depending on its contact with labial or labialized consonants. Christopher Ehret has proposed a five vowel system with long and short *a, *e, *o, *i, and *u, arguing that his reconstruction is supported by the Chadic and Cushitic vowels. Vladimir Orel and Olga Stolbova instead proposed a six vowel system with *a, *e, *o, *i, *ü ([y]), and *u; they further argued that the central vowels *e and *o could not occur together in the same root. Taking a different approach, Ronny Meyer and H. Ekkehard Wolff propose that Proto-Afroasiatic may have had no vowels as such, instead employing various syllabic consonants (*l, *m, *n, *r) and semivowels or semivowel-like consonants (*w, *y, *ʔ, *ḥ, *ʕ, *h, *ʔʷ, *ḥʷ, *ʕʷ, *hʷ) to form syllables; vowels would have later been inserted into these syllables ("vocalogenesis"), developing first into a two vowel system (*a and *ə), as supported by Berber and Chadic data, and then developing further vowels.

=== Tones and accent ===
Some scholars postulate that Proto-Afroasiatic was a tonal language, with tonality subsequently lost in some branches. Igor Diakonoff argued for the existence of tone based on his reconstruction of many otherwise homophonous words. Christopher Ehret instead takes the fact that three branches of AA have tone as his starting point; he has postulated a tonal system of at least two tonal phonemes, falling tone, rising tone, and possibly a third tone, level tone.

Other scholars argue that Proto-AA had a pitch accent and some branches subsequently developed tone. Such scholars postulate that tones developed to compensate for lost or reduced syllables, and note that certain tones are often associated with certain syllable-final consonants. Zygmunt Frajzyngier and Erin Shay note that in AA tonal languages, tone usually has a grammatical rather than a lexical function, and argue that there is thus no basis to reconstruct it as a lexical feature in PAA, as Diakonoff does; they find Ehret's reasoning more sound.

=== Syllable structure ===
Permitted Proto-Afroasiatic syllables according to Wilson 2020
CV	CV:	CVC	CVC-C	CV:-C

Igor Diakonoff argues that Proto-Afroasiatic required a consonant at both the beginning of a syllable and the end of a word, and that only one consonant was possible at the beginning or end of a syllable. Zygmunt Frajzyngier and Erin Shay note that these rules appear to be based on Semitic structures, whereas Chadic includes syllables beginning with vowels as well as initial and final consonant clusters. Christopher Ehret argues that all word stems in PAA took the shape CV (with a possible alternate form VC) and CVC, with suffixes often giving the syllabic shape CVCC.

David Wilson agrees with Diakonoff that the root syllable could only begin with a single consonant, but adds a requirement that syllables have two mora weight and argues for the possibility of an extra-syllabic consonant at the end of a root (CVC-C or CV:C).

== Morphosyntax ==
=== Biradical and triradical roots ===
The degree to which the Proto-AA verbal root was originally triradical (having three consonants) or biradical (having two consonants) is debated. Among the modern branches, most Semitic roots are triradical, whereas most Chadic, Omotic, and Cushitic roots are biradical. The "traditional theory" argues for original triradicalism in the family, as is the case in Semitic. In this theory, almost all biradical roots are the result of the loss of a third consonant. As early as the Middle Ages, however, grammarians had noticed that some triradical roots in Arabic differed in only one consonant and had related meanings. According to supporters of original triradicalism such as Gideon Goldenberg, these variations are common in language and inconclusive for the matter. He compares phonetic similarity between words with similar meanings in English such as glow, gleam, glitter, glaze, and glade.

Other scholars argue that the PAA root may have originally been mostly biradical, to which a third radical was then added. Christopher Ehret argues that the third consonants were derivational affixes, proposing as many as thirty-seven separate verbal extensions that subsequently became fossilized as third consonants. This theory has been criticized by some, such as Andrzej Zaborski and Alan Kaye, as being too many extensions to be realistic, though Zygmunt Frajzyngier and Erin Shay note that some Chadic languages have as many as twelve extensions. An alternative model was proposed by Georges Bohas, who argued that the third consonants were added to differentiate roots of similar meaning but without the third consonant having a particular meaning itself. Biradical verbs may also have been made triradical on the model of so-called "weak verbs," which have a final radical y or w.

Many scholars do not argue for the original nature of either biradical or triradical roots, instead arguing that there are original triradical roots, original biradical roots, and triradical roots resulting from the addition of a consonant. Not all triradical roots can be convincingly explained as coming from biradicals, and there are cases in which triradical roots with similar meanings appear to differ in one consonant due to root-internal changes or derivation via rhyme. Andréas Stauder argues that the evidence from Ancient Egyptian shows that both tri- and biradical verbs were probably present in Proto-Afroasiatic. Igor Diakonoff, in contrast, argued that the PAA root was originally biradical but saw the biradical roots outside of Semitic as largely the result of losing a third consonant.

=== Root-and-pattern-morphology ===
Afroasiatic languages feature a "root-and-pattern" (nonconcatenative) system of morphology, in which the root consists of consonants alone and vowels are inserted via apophony according to "templates" to create words. A "template" consists of one or more vowels and sometimes a consonant; consonants included in the pattern often involve gemination.

If root-and-pattern morphology originated in Proto-Afroasiatic, then an explanation must be found for why it has mostly disappeared in the Omotic and Chadic branches; if it was not present in PAA, then an explanation must be found for why it developed independently in the Semitic, Egyptian, and Cushitic branches.

=== Case alignment ===
Hans-Jürgen Sasse proposed that Proto-Afroasiatic was a marked nominative language, in which the nominative case is only used to mark the subject of a verb, whereas an absolutive case is the citation form of the noun and also marks the object. Evidence for marked nominative alignment comes primarily from the use of cases in Cushitic and the so-called "states" of the noun in Berber languages; additionally, Helmut Satzinger has argued that the forms of the pronouns in the other branches show evidence of marked nominative alignment.

Igor Diakonoff instead argued that Proto-Afroasiatic was an ergative-absolutive language, in which the ergative case marks the subject of transitive verbs and the absolutive case marks both the object of transitive verbs and the subject of intransitive verbs. Satzinger suggests that Proto-Afroasiatic may have developed from ergative-absolutive to a marked nominative language. However, Abdelaziz Allati notes that, if PAA was originally ergative-aligned, it is unclear why both the attested ancient languages and modern AA languages predominantly have nominative-accusative alignment.

=== Word order ===
Proto-Afroasiatic word order has not yet been established. Igor Diakonoff proposed that PAA had verb-subject-object word order (VSO word order), meaning that the verb would come first in most sentences. Carsten Peust likewise supports VSO word order, as this is found in the two oldest attested branches, Egyptian and Semitic. However, Ronny Meyer and H. Ekkehard Wolff argue that this proposal does not concord with Diakonoff's suggestion that PAA was an ergative-absolutive language, in which subject and object are not valid categories. Zygmunt Frajzyngier and Erin Shay further note that, if Proto-Afroasiatic had VSO word order, then an explanation must be found for why two of its branches, Omotic and Cushitic, show subject–object–verb word order (SOV word order). Both sets of scholars argue that this area needs more research.

== Nouns and adjectives ==
=== Grammatical gender ===
A system of sex-based male and female grammatical gender is widely agreed to have been present in Proto-Afroasiatic. However, Russell Schuh argues that there was no gender distinction in the plural, as this feature is found only in Semitic and Berber (see also personal pronouns). Christopher Ehret argues against the consensus that grammatical gender existed in Proto-Afroasiatic, arguing that its development is an isogloss separating all other Afroasiatic languages from Omotic, which alone preserves the original, genderless grammar of the proto-language. Other scholars such as Lionel Bender argue that Omotic has lost grammatical gender despite originally having had it.

A feminine morpheme -Vt is found widely in Afroasiatic languages. Lameen Souag argues that this feminine ending -t is probably a case of a grammaticalized demonstrative, as this feature has also independently developed in some Chadic and Cushitic languages. Diakonoff argued that the original gender system of Afroasiatic had masculine endings *-y/*-w (later *-Vy/*-Vw) and feminine endings *-H/*-y (later *-āʔ/*-āy), the later of which was later ousted by feminine *-(a)t on nouns. Marijn van Putten has reconstructed a feminine ending *-ay/*-āy from Semitic and Berber evidence: he argues that this ending comes down from the last common ancestor of Berber and Semitic, which may be Proto-Afroasiatic. Despite arguing that Proto-Afroasiatic had no grammatical gender, Ehret argues that there is evidence for natural gender in all branches, including Omotic, perhaps marked originally by an opposition of PAA *-u (masculine) and *-i (feminine), as also found in the second person singular pronouns.

In addition to grammatical gender, Igor Diakonoff argues that Afroasiatic languages show traces of a nominal classification system, which was already unproductive in the Proto-Afroasiatic stage. In particular, he noted a suffix *-Vb- used to mark harmful animals. Vladimir Orel also attests less well-defined uses for this suffix, while Ehret takes this as a suffix to mark animals and parts of the body.

=== Number ===
Afroasiatic languages today clearly distinguish singular and plural. One of the first features of Proto-Afroasiatic proposed by Joseph Greenberg was the existence of "internal-a plurals" (a type of broken plural): a pluralizing morpheme in which a vowel *a was inserted between the two final consonants of the root, possibly replacing another vowel via apophony. However, Paul Newman has argued that while plurals via vowel alteration are frequent in Chadic, they cannot be reconstructed back to Proto-Chadic or Proto-Afroasiatic. Andréas Stauder likewise argues that Coptic and Egyptian plurals via vowel change may have developed independently. Lameen Souag argues that while some form of vowel-changing plural likely goes back to Proto-Afroasiatic, many of the templates found in the branches likely do not.

Several Afroasiatic languages of the Semitic, Chadic, and Cushitic branches attest pluralization via reduplication, a feature which has often been assumed to go back to Proto-Afroasiatic. Robert Ratcliffe has instead argued that this reduplicating pattern originated after PAA, as a way to allow biradical nouns to insert "internal-a," a process which then became generalized to other roots in some languages; as an alternative hypothesis, they may have developed from forms with plural suffixes. Afroasiatic languages also use several pluralizing affixes – few of these, however, are present in more than a few branches, making them difficult to reconstruct.

In addition to a singular and plural, Egyptian and Semitic attest a dual, the endings of which can be reconstructed respectively as Ancient Egyptian: *-a(y) and Semitic *-ā (nominative) and *-ay (oblique). These endings are very similar to each other, and due to the dual's attestation in the two earliest attested branches of Afroasiatic it is also usually reconstructed for the proto-language. The loss of the dual in the other branches over time is a well attested feature in languages, including within the Egyptian and Semitic branches themselves.

=== Case system ===
Reconstructed Proto-Afroasiatic case endings
Case	Singular	Plural
Nominative	*-u	-*ū
Accusative / Absolutive	*-a	-*ī
Genitive	*-i	-*ī
Locative/terminative (disputed)	*-is	–

There is widespread agreement that Proto-Afroasiatic had case inflection. First proposed by Hans-Jürgen Sasse on the basis of his reconstruction of the Proto-Cushitic case system in 1984, Proto-Afroasiatic is usually reconstructed with a case system similar to Proto-Semitic. This gives a nominative ending*-u, accusative or absolutive *-a, and genitive *-i. Besides Proto-Semitic, evidence for these endings is derived from the Cushitic languages and has been argued to exist in Berber as well. The Egyptian nominal ending -w, found on some masculine nouns, may also be evidence of this system. Some evidence for nominative -u may also exist from the Omotic branch. By the evidence of Semitic, in the dual and plural, only the nominative and an oblique were distinguished. David Wilson, on the other hand, argues that the case endings are often not cognate in the individual branches of Afroasiatic and that this precludes their reconstruction for the proto-language. It also has been cautioned that due to the immense time span between even the oldest attested daughter languages and Proto-Afroasiatic, it would be naive to simply project back any case system found in these languages into Proto-Afroasiatic. Additionally, it is far from certain that Proto-Semitic actually had a genitive in *-i, as the so-called genitive might have come about from a reanalysis of the nisba *-i (which is also found in Old Egyptian, unlike a genitive in *-i). Obviously, if a genitive in *-i cannot even be reconstructed for Proto-Semitic, it cannot be reconstructed for Proto-Afroasiatic either.

Old Akkadian and Palaeosyrian have two additional cases, a locative in -um and a terminative case in -iš. Scholars debate whether these are vestigial cases or adverbial postpositions. The ending -iš has often been connected to the Egyptian postposition js and is sometimes used to reconstruct a Proto-Afroasiatic locative case. Diakonoff also believed he could reconstruct a comitative-dative case in *-dV or *-Vd, an ablative-comparative case in *-kV, a "directive" case in *-l, and an ablative case in *-p.

=== Derived nouns and adjectives ===
==== *mV-prefix ====
A prefix mV- is the most widely attested affix in AA that is used to derive nouns. For PAA, its shape has variously been reconstructed as *ma-, *ma(i)-, *mV-, and *-m-. In the daughter languages, it is attested with a wide variety of meanings and functions, such as forming deverbal agent nouns, place nouns, instrument nouns, as well as participles. Erin Shay argues that *mV- is the only prefix in the AA phylum that clearly goes back to the proto-language rather than possibly being an areal feature.

The precise meaning and origin of this prefix in PAA are debated. There is a long tradition of comparing the prefix to the interrogative pronoun *mā 'who'. Carsten Peust has suggested a common PAA origin for the prefix in forming nouns of place and instrument, but proposes that the *mV- prefix used in agent nouns and participles is actually a post-PAA development, derived from the interrogative pronoun *mā 'who'. Christopher Ehret, meanwhile, proposes that the prefix did not exist in PAA at all, but is a later development from the interrogative pronoun. Gábor Takács and Andrzej Zaborski both rejected a connection to *mā entirely; Takács instead suggested that a connection to the Egyptian preposition m needs further consideration, while Zaborski argued for a connection to a verb *VmV- 'to be'.

==== "Nisba" ====
The term nisba refers to a suffix found in the Semitic (-iy) and Egyptian (-j) branches, with possible relict traces in Berber. A related suffix, -āwi, occurs in Arabic and possibly in Egyptian, as suggested by e.g. ḥmww 'craftsman', from ḥmt 'craft'. Carsten Peust argues that this suffix descends from Proto-Afroasiatic, as it is found in the two oldest attested branches of the family. In the Semitic languages, the "nisba" is used to form adjectives, derive nouns for people associated with a place or profession, and to form hypocoristic names. In Egyptian, it forms adjectives and nouns from nouns and prepositions.

The "nisba" is often assumed to be connected to the genitive case ending in Semitic and possibly Cushitic. Igor Diakonoff argued that the "nisba" was an "expanded" form of the genitive suffix: he reconstructs the "nisba" suffix as *-iya or -*ī; he also suggests the existence of a variant *-uwa. Lipiński suggests that the "nisba" originated as a postposition, which was also used to create the genitive case. Christopher Ehret argues that the original form of the suffix was -*iy and also reconstructs a form-*ay. This latter form is attested among the Semitic languages and may have been dialectal in origin.

== Pronouns ==
=== Personal pronouns ===
The forms of the personal pronouns are very stable throughout Afroasiatic (excluding Omotic), but there is no consensus on what the reconstructed set of Afroasiatic pronouns might have looked like. Most modern branches have an independent / absolute pronoun, an object pronoun, and a suffix /possessive pronoun. According to Igor Diakonoff, the suffix/possessive pronoun was originally used as the object of verbs and to show a possessive relationship, the "independent" pronoun served to show emphasis, and the "object" pronoun was used to mark the subject of intransitive verbs and the direct object of transitive verbs.

All Afroasiatic branches differentiate between masculine and feminine third person singular pronouns, and all except for Cushitic and Omotic also differentiate between second person singular masculine and feminine pronouns. Semitic and Berber also differentiate between masculine and feminine second and third person plural, but there is no evidence for this in Ancient Egyptian, Cushitic, or Chadic, perhaps indicating that there was no gender distinction in the plural in Proto-Afroasiatic. Chadic has both an inclusive and exclusive form of "we", which Igor Diakonoff and Václav Blažek reconstruct also for Proto-Afroasiatic.

Helmut Satzinger has argued that Proto-Afroasiatic only distinguished between the "object" and "possessive" pronouns, deriving the independent pronouns via various processes in the branches. He argues that the independent pronouns derive from various strategies combining pronominal elements with different nominal or pronominal bases. Václav Blažek reconstructs an original set of independent pronouns but argues that the ones found in most current Afroasiatic languages arose by a process of suppletion similar to that argued by Satzinger. An example of one such process is the use of the prefix *ʔan-/*ʔin-, which appears in the Semitic and Old Egyptian first person independent pronouns, the Old Egyptian, Cushitic, and Semitic second person singular and plural pronouns, and the Old Egyptian and Berber third person singular and plural independent pronouns. While Ehret reconstructs this as the original form of the first person singular pronoun, other scholars argue that this element either represents a form of the copula 'to be' or a particle meaning 'self'.

Proto-Afroasiatic personal pronouns according to Ehret 1995 and Blažek 2019
Number	Scholar	Singular, bound	Singular, independent	Plural, bound	Plural, independent (Note: Ehret only reconstructs one set of plural pronouns)
1	Ehret	*i, *yi	*(ʔ)ân-/(ʔ)în-	*(ʔ)ǎnn-/(ʔ)ǐnn-	
1	Blažek	*ʔya/*ʔyi/*ʔyu	*ʔaku	*muni (inclusive), *na/*ni/*nu (exclusive)	*muni (inclusive), *ḥina/u (exclusive)
2 m.	Ehret	*ku, *ka	*(ʔ)ânt/(ʔ)înt-	*kuuna	
2 m.	Blažek	*ku	*ta	*kunwa	*tunwa
2 f.	Ehret	*ki	*(ʔ)ânt/(ʔ)înt-	*kuuna	
2 f.	Blažek	*ki	*ti	*kinya	*tunya
3	Ehret (Note: Because Ehret argues that grammatical gender did not exist in Proto-Afroasiatic, he has only reconstructed one third person pronoun for both male and female.)	*si, *isi		*su, *usu	
3	Blažek (m)	*šu	*šuwa	*šunwa	
3	Blažek (f)	*ši	*šiya	*šinya	

=== Determiners ===
Afroasiatic languages attest a variety of determiners, only some of which are likely to derive from Proto-Afroasiatic. As first noticed by Joseph Greenberg, Afroasiatic languages in all branches but Omotic attest a series of third person agreement markers in the form n- (masculine), t- (feminine), and n- (plural), which probably derive from Proto-Afroasiatic determiners; Omotic attests t- (feminine) alone of this set. Additionally, Omotic attests a masculine agreement form k-, while Chadic and Cushitic show a gender- and number-neutral form k-: both likely go back to a Proto-Afroasiatic determiner *k-, reconstructed by Ehret as *kaa 'this'. Diakonoff argues that in Proto-Afroasiatic these forms were originally demonstrative pronouns that later developed into third person personal pronouns in some branches and into genitive markers in others. Ehret also reconstructs a demonstrative *h- ('this/that') or *ha- ('this/that one').

=== Interrogatives ===
The most common Afroasiatic interrogative pronoun is *mV, which Ehret reconstructs as *ma, *mi 'what?'. Diakonoff argued that *mV ultimately derived from a demonstrative stem *m-. Only the Semitic reflexes of this root have separate forms for animate ('"who?") and inanimate ("what?") referents. The Old Egyptian and Berber descendants both appear to be used regardless of whether the referent is a person or thing. It is therefore not clear if this pronoun differentiated animacy in Proto-Afroasiatic. Lack of differentiation between "who?" and "what?" is also sporadically attested in Semitic and Cushitic, but appears to be absent in Chadic; most modern AA languages use different lexical roots to make the distinction.

Ehret also reconstructs a second interrogative *wa-/*wi- 'what?'. The PAA origin of this form is also accepted by Takács, but he reconstructs it as *ʔaw/*wa 'who?'.

Diakonoff also reconstructs an interrogative adjective, *ayyV-, which he claims left traces in Semitic, Cushitic, and Omotic. Lipiński, on the other hand, holds this term to be Semitic and deriving from a particle ʔay 'where?'. Takács derives this particle from PAA *ʔay/*ya, a variant of *ʔaw/*wa 'who?'.

== Verbs ==
Most morphological reconstruction for PAA has focused on the verb, with categories found in Semitic languages such as aspect, voice, and person.

=== Tenses, aspects, and moods (TAMs) ===
There is little agreement about which tenses, aspects, or moods (TAMs) Proto-Afroasiatic might have had: it may have had two basic forms (indicative vs. subjunctive, state vs. action, transitive vs. intransitive, or perfective vs. imperfective) or three (unmarked vs. perfective vs. imperfective). There is also debate about whether some of the forms may have been nominal (using verbal nouns), or possibly participial or gerundival, rather than purely verbal. TAMs may have been indicated by both changes in the verb stem and the use of suffixes and prefixes. Some scholars argue that prefixes were used for "eventive" (describing things happening) aspects, as opposed to the "suffix conjugation," which described states. Abdelaziz Allati, however, argues that this is a later development, which he associates primarily with Semitic.

==== "Prefix conjugation" ====
Proposed PAA prefix conjugation, by Wilson 2020 (Note: V stands for a vowel of unknown quality.)
Person		Singular	Plural
1st		*ʔV-	*nV-
2nd		*tV-	
3rd	M	*yV-	*yV-
3rd	F	*tV-	*yV-

Helmut Satzinger has argued that the earliest form of conjugation in Afroasiatic was the so-called "prefix conjugation," a form found in Semitic, Berber, and Cushitic that uses prefixes to conjugate verbs for person, gender, and number. Other scholars argue that, as there is no evidence for the "prefix conjugation" in Omotic, Chadic, or Egyptian, the prefix conjugation may be a shared innovation in Semitic, Berber, and Cushitic. In those languages where it appears, the "prefix conjugation" is used with two stems, with Igor Diakonoff identifying one as perfective/punctual as well as jussive, and the other with the imperfective. These stems may also be known as "short form" (=perfective) and "long form" (=imperfective).

Assuming a PAA origin, the prefixes can be reconstructed as agreeing with the forms of the "bound" personal pronouns in having *n- for first person plural, *t- for second person plural and singular and feminine third person singular, and *y/*i- for third person masculine and third person plural; the form of the first person singular is unclear, but may be *ʔ-. The prefixes may have originally developed from the pronouns or from auxiliary verbs with pronominal elements, though N. J. C. Kouwenberg argues that the close agreement between the forms in Semitic, Berber, and Cushitic indicates that such grammaticalization must have happened in Proto-Afroasiatic itself or earlier.

===== Short stem (perfective) =====
Joseph Greenberg proposed that the perfective ("past") stem of PAA had the form *yV-qtVl, based on Semitic, Berber, and Cushitic data. There are a number of different "short" stems attested in Afroasiatic: in Semitic there are aorist, relative, and ventive forms. In those branches with an apophonic imperfective, the perfective stem often has a vowel u. Semitic, however, also attest a perfective form with -a- (yV-CCaC), used with intransitive verbs. Kossmann and Suchard argue for its connection to a similar form in Berber, an aspectual stative form with the same vocalization. Kouwenberg argues for the PAA origin of the u- perfective given the parallels between Semitic, Cushitic, and Berber; he suggests that it may have originally been a resultative form that turned into a perfective.

===== Imperfective and long stem =====
Semitic, Berber, and possibly Cushitic all include an imperfective verb stem that includes an apophonic vowel a and gemination of the second consonant (*yV-qattVl). Greenberg argued that this form represented the original stem of imperfective ("present") in Afroasiatic. Maarten Kossmann and Benjamin D. Suchard have reconstructed this verb form as having the role of the imperfective in their hypothetical Proto-Berbero-Semitic while remaining agnostic on its PAA origins. Ancient Egyptian also attests a geminated stem apparently used to mark incomplete action, though it was apparently formally different from that found in other branches. Other scholars such as N. J. C. Kouwenberg and Frithiof Rundgren have argued that the *yV-qattVl form was originally a pluractional verb form that has come to replace an original PAA imperfective form. Rainer Voigt accepts that the *yV-qattVl stem is an original form of the imperfective, but argues that it was only used with certain classes of verbs. According to Voigt, the important feature of the imperfective was a-apophony.

Central Semitic languages attest an imperfective form *yi-qVtlu-, which Rundgren argued was the original Semitic imperfective form. Kouwenberg argues that this form has parallels in Semitic, Chadic, and Berber, and thus likely represents the PAA imperfective.

==== Stative ("suffix") conjugation ====
Proposed PAA suffix conjugation, reconstructed by Wilson 2020 (Note: V stands for a vowel of unknown quality.)
Person		Singular	Plural
1st		*-(ā)ku	*-(ā)nV
2nd		*-(ā)tV	*-(ā)tVn
3rd	M	*-0	
3rd	F	*-0/-t	

A second type of conjugation is represented by the "suffix conjugation", used to conjugate an originally stative form of the verb, which has close matches in Egyptian and Semitic, and parallels in Berber and Cushitic. It is commonly reconstructed as part of the verbal system of PAA. Like the prefix conjugation, the endings show some similarities to the pronominal system, although they are not as clear: they appear related to the endings added to the base ʔan- in Egyptian. N. J. C. Kouwenberg argues that the stative likely began as a conjugation for predicate adjectives in PAA, though little else can be said about the development of the form. It may have originally been a nominalized verb form.

Some scholars have questioned the common origin of the stative: Elsa Oréal argues the Egyptian and Semitic forms followed a common grammaticalization process rather than originating in PAA. Maarten Kossmann and Benjamin D. Suchard similarly argue that the vowel patterns of the Semitic and Berber forms cannot be reconciled for their hypothetical "Proto-Berbero-Semitic," indicating that they are not directly cognate. John Huehnergard, however, argues that the close match between e.g. Proto-Semitic *samiʕ-ta 'you are/were heard' and Egyptian sḏm.tj 'you are/were heard' makes a common origin more likely. Andréas Stauder proposes a vocalization of the Proto-Egyptian form as *CaCVC-, which he argues matches the Semitic form well. The relationship of the Berber and Semitic form remains unclear, with most scholars holding them not to be cognate.

Egyptologists Frank Kammerzell and Wolfgang Schenkel have argued, on the basis of the spelling of the stative form in Old Egyptian, that the Egyptian stative actually shows two conjugations, one perfective and one stative in meaning. Rainer Voigt has taken this as an Afroasiatic feature which also explains the development of the West Semitic perfective. This theory has been rejected or questioned by Andréas Stauder, Kouwenberg, and Chris Reintges.

=== Derived verbs ===
==== Reduplicated and geminated verbs ====
The use of a vowel a to mark pluractionality is widespread in Afroasiatic, often accompanied by consonant reduplication or gemination. Reduplication and gemination also frequently encode causative, intensive, iterative, and habitual aspect. The use of full or partial reduplication may derive from contact with other African languages rather than from Proto-Afroasiatic. Carsten Peust, on the other hand, argues that the presence of such verbs in Egyptian, the oldest attested language, and in Chadic and Semitic makes them a good candidate for reconstruction in Proto-Afroasiatic. It is likewise reconstructed for PAA by Christopher Ehret and Vladimir Orel.

==== Verbal extensions ====
Three derivational affixes ("verbal extensions") can be reconstructed for Proto-Afroasiatic, which show the following range of meanings in the branches:

- *-s-: 'causative', 'factitive' or 'denominal'
- *-t-: 'passive', 'middle voice', 'reflexive' and other detransitive functions;
- *-n-/*-m-: 'passive', 'anticausative', 'middle', and other functions. It is unclear whether the affix was originally *-m- (as in Berber and Cushitic) or *-n- (as in Semitic and Egyptian). It is also possible that *-n- and *-m- were originally two separate affixes.

In the modern languages, the meanings of the *-n-/*-m- and *-t- morpheme often overlap, though presumably they were distinct in PAA. The presence of all three of these morphemes across a broad range of Afroasiatic families indicates that they originate in the proto-language rather than via chance resemblance or borrowing. However, the relationship of the Egyptian n- and particularly -t affixes to those found in other branches has been criticized as weak or rejected by some scholars.

The *s- and *n-/*m- affixes have been explained as originating in pronominal/deictic expresses or auxiliary verbs which became grammaticalized, a proposal which Andréas Stauder also extends to *-t-. In Semitic and Berber, all three morphemes appear as prefixes (with -t- originally an infix in Semitic). In Omotic, -s and -t consistently appear as suffixes rather than prefixes, while in Cushitic, the placement of the affixes varies in the prefix and suffix conjugations. In Egyptian, s- and n- appear as prefixes while -t appears as a suffix.

Additional verbal extensions, with a wide range of meanings, have been reconstructed by Ehret and Vladimir Orel.

== Numerals ==
Unlike in the Indo-European or Austronesian language families, numerals in AA languages cannot be traced to a proto-system. The Cushitic and Chadic numeral systems appear to have originally been base 5. The system in Berber, Egyptian, and Semitic, however, has independent words for the numbers 6–9. Igor Diakonoff has suggested that many of the Afroasiatic languages' numerals derive transparently from counting on fingers (e.g., Cushitic/Omotic *lam 'two' = 'index finger'; Semitic *ḫams- 'five' = 'handful').

In some instances, the same numeral has more than one root within a single branch. Within the Semitic language family alone, Edward Lipiński counts four different roots meaning "one". Aren Wilson-Wright suggests that the root for 'one' has been replaced at least three times throughout the history of Afroasiatic and points to parallels in the Indo-European Greek and Tocharian languages. The Semitic, Chadic, and Berber branches likewise show evidence for different branch-internal roots for two; Ehret et al. (2023) argue that such differences could arise from different words for ordinal and cardinal numbers or from the use of different words for counting and adjectival forms of numbers.

An additional difficulty in comparing numeral sets is that they often have irregular sound correspondences, as can be seen in Indo-European by comparing Latin quattuor quinque to the Greek cognates tettares pente (both 'four' 'five').

- 'one' has at least three proposed cognate sets:

- PAA *whd (Wolfgang Schenkel): Egyptian wꜥ, Arabic (Semitic) wḥd, Proto-Berber *yīw-an. This is a traditional proposed etymology. This set is rejected by Takács, but Lipiński does support the connection between Berber and Egyptian. Carsten Peust supports the Egypto-Semitic connection but notes that it relies on "Rösslerian correspondences".
- Proto-Semitic *ʕast-, Central Atlas Tamazight and Zenati (Berber) iğ (fem. išt), Ometo (Omotic) ista, as well as Egyptian ꜥfty 'each, everyone'. Aren Wilson-Wright finds the Egyptian match the best despite some semantic and phonological difficulties, but notes the difficulty in reconstructing the Berber and Omotic roots in their respective proto-languages.
- PAA *tk (Hans Mukarovsky): Proto-Chadic *t-k-n, Oromo (Eastern Cushitic) tokko, Kafa (North Omotic) tok 'to be united, together'. Carsten Peust notes that this root is somewhat dubious because several unrelated languages around the world have similar words for 'one'.

The following cognates are discussed for the numerals 2–4:

- 'two' has three reconstructed roots:

- PAA *tsan-/*can (Ehret), *čn (Takács): * Egyptian sn.wj, Semitic *ṯin-, Berber *sin
- PAA *tsîr(n)-/*cîr(n) (Ehret), *čr (Takács): *Semitic *ṯir/ṯər, Proto-Chadic *čr. Takács and Václav Blažek both suggest that this form may be a variant of the first root for 'two'. Takács notes that only one branch, Semitic has both forms.
- PAA *ɬâm- (Ehret): Cushitic *lam, Omotic *lam-

- 'three', PAA *xaynz- (Ehret): Egyptian ḫmt-, North Omotic **x_{2}ayz-, Chadic *knɗ-; however the reconstructed Chadic form is uncertain and the sound correspondences problematic.
- 'four', PAA *fâzw- (Ehret), *fṭ (Takács), *fVdS/*-fVrS (Note: S stands for a sonorant of unknown value.) (Diakonoff): Egyptian fd-, Beja (Cushitic) faḍig, North Omotic *Peč; some scholars also connect West Chadic *fīr.
- 'five': Semitic **ḫams, Berber *sammūs-, with the Berber form having changed its initial sound to /s/ to alliterate with the word for 'six' Alternatively, the Berber form may be borrowed from Semitic.

The following cognate sets from 6–8 are also commonly accepted, although each contains inconsistent sound correspondences:

- 'six': Egyptian srs, Proto-Semitic *šidṯ-, Berber sdˁis, Hausa (Chadic) šidda
- 'seven': Egyptian sfḫ, Proto-Semitic *šabʕ-. A number of scholars also connect Berber sa.
- 'eight': Egyptian ḫmn-, Proto-Semitic *ṯ(a)mān-, but with an unexplained sound correspondence of /ḫ/ to /ṯ/. Whether Berber tam is also cognate is hotly debated due to the irregular correspondence of /t/ to /ṯ/ and /ḫ/, and the lack of a third radical (-n).

Lastly:

- 'nine' also has a traditional proposed cognate set: Egyptian psḏ, Semitic *tiš(a)ʕ, Berber tẓa. However, Lipiński rejects the equivalency of the Egyptian and Semitic roots but accepts the link between Semitic and Berber, while Takács accepts that the Egyptian and Semitic roots are probably related (with a case of dissimilation of /t/ to /p/ in Egyptian), but views the connection to Berber as doubtful.

== See also ==
- Afrasianist phonetic notation
- Wiktionary:Appendix:Proto-Afroasiatic reconstructions

== Bibliography ==
- Allati, Abdelaziz (2012). "From Proto-Berber to Proto-Afroasiatic". In Zuckermann, Ghil'ad (ed.). Burning Issues in Afro-Asiatic Linguistics. Cambridge Scholars. pp. 62–74. ISBN 978-1-4438-4070-5.
- Blažek, Václav (1999). Numerals: comparative-etymological analyses of numeral systems and their implications:(Saharan, Nubian, Egyptian, Berber, Kartvelian, Uralic, Altaic and Indo-European languages). Masarykova univerzita Brně.
- Blažek, Václav (2017). "Omotic Numerals". Folia Orientalia. 54: 63–86.
- Blažek, Václav (2019). "The Afroasiatic Personal Pronouns: A Textbook Example of a Suppletive Paradigm". In Kim, Ronald I. (ed.). Diachronic Perspectives of Suppletion. Baar-Verlag. pp. 239–270. ISBN 978-3-935536-81-3.
- Bubenik, Vit (2023). "Reconstructing the Proto-Semitic Nominal and Verbal Systems in the Context of Afroasiatic Languages". In Almansa-Villatoro, M. Victoria; Štubňová Nigrelli, Silvia (eds.). Ancient Egyptian and Afroasiatic: Rethinking the Origins. Eisenbrauns. pp. 223–254. ISBN 9781646022120.
- Diakonoff, Igor M. (1988). Afrasian Languages. Nauka.
- Diakonoff, Igor M. (1992). "Proto-Afrasian and Old Akkadian: A study in historical phonetics". Journal of Afroasiatic Languages. 4 (1–2).
- Ehret, Christopher (1995). Reconstructing Proto-Afroasiatic (Proto-Afrasian): vowels, tone, consonants, and vocabulary. University of California Press. ISBN 0-520-09799-8.
- Ehret, Christopher; Vyas, Deven N.; Assefa, Shiferaw; Gaston, J. Lafayette; Gleason, Tiffany; Kitchen, Andrew (2023). "Ancient Egyptian's Place in the Afroasiatic Language Family". In Almansa-Villatoro, M. Victoria; Štubňová Nigrelli, Silvia (eds.). Ancient Egyptian and Afroasiatic: Rethinking the Origins. Eisenbrauns. pp. 255–277. ISBN 9781646022120.
- Frajzyngier, Zygmunt (2012). "Typological outline of the Afroasiatic phylum". In Frajzyngier, Zygmunt; Shay, Erin (eds.). The Afroasiatic Languages. Cambridge University Press. pp. 505–624. ISBN 978-0-521-86533-3.
- Frajzyngier, Zygmunt; Shay, Erin (2012). "Introduction". In Frajzyngier, Zygmunt; Shay, Erin (eds.). The Afroasiatic Languages. Cambridge University Press. pp. 1–17.
- Frajzyngier, Zygmunt; Shay, Erin (2020). "Contact and Afroasiatic Languages". In Hickey, Raymond (ed.). The Handbook of Language Contact (2 ed.). John Wiley & Sons. pp. 571–591. doi:10.1002/9781119485094.ch29. ISBN 9781119485094. S2CID 225371874.
- Gensler, Orin D. (2015). "A typological look at Egyptian *d > ʕ". In Grossman, Eitan; Haspelmath, Martin; Richter, Tonio Sebastian (eds.). Egyptian-Coptic Linguistics in Typological Perspective. De Gruyter Mouton. pp. 187–202. doi:10.1515/9783110346510.187. ISBN 978-3-11-034639-8.
- Goldenberg, Gideon (2005). "Semitic Triradicalism and the Biradical Question". In Khan, Geoffrey (ed.). Semitic Studies in Honour of Edward Ullendorff. Brill. pp. 7–25. doi:10.1163/9789047415756_004. ISBN 978-90-47-41575-6.
- Gragg, Gene (2019). "Semitic and Afro-Asiatic". In Huehnergard, John; Pat-El, Na‘ama (eds.). The Semitic Languages (2 ed.). Routledge. pp. 22–48.
- Greenberg, Joseph A. (1952). "The Afro-Asiatic (Hemito-Semitic) Present". Journal of the American Oriental Society. 72 (1): 1–9. doi:10.2307/595321. JSTOR 595231.
- Güldemann, Tom (2018). "Historical linguistics and genealogical language classification in Africa". In Güldemann, Tom (ed.). The Languages and Linguistics of Africa. The World of Linguistics, Volume 11. Berlin: De Mouton Gruyter. pp. 58–444. doi:10.1515/9783110421668-002. ISBN 9783110421668. S2CID 133888593.
- Hayward, Richard J. (2000). "Afroasiatic". In Heine, Bernd; Nurse, Derek (eds.). African Languages: An Introduction. Cambridge University Press. pp. 74–98.
- Hetzron, Robert (2009). "Afroasiatic Languages". In Comrie, Bernard (ed.). The World's Major Languages (2 ed.). Routledge. pp. 545–550.
- Hodge, Carleton T. (1971). "Afroasiatic: An Overview". In Hodge, Carleton T. (ed.). Afroasiatic: A Survey. Mouton. pp. 9–26. doi:10.1515/9783110869866-002. ISBN 978-90-279-1844-4.
- Huehnergard, John (2004). "Afro-Asiatic". In Woodard, In R.D. (ed.). The Cambridge Encyclopedia of the World’s Ancient Languages. Cambridge University Press. pp. 138–159.
- Huehnergard, John (2023). "Proto-Semitic and Egyptian". In Almansa-Villatoro, M. Victoria; Štubňová Nigrelli, Silvia (eds.). Ancient Egyptian and Afroasiatic: Rethinking the Origins. Eisenbrauns. pp. 139–160. ISBN 9781646022120.
- Idiatov, Dmitry (2015). "Egyptian non-selective interrogative pronominals: history and typology". In Grossman, Eitan; Haspelmath, Martin; Richter, Tonio Sebastian (eds.). Egyptian-Coptic Linguistics in Typological Perspective. De Gruyter Mouton. pp. 289–322. doi:10.1515/9783110346510.289. ISBN 978-3-11-034639-8.
- Kaye, Alan S.; Daniels, Peter T. (1992). "Comparative Afroasiatic and General Genetic Linguistics". WORD. 43 (3): 429–458. doi:10.1080/00437956.1992.12098319.
- Kortlandt, Frederik (1996). "Christopher Ehret. Reconstructing Proto-Afroasiatic (Proto-Afrasian): Vowels, Tone, Consonants, and Vocabulary. (University of California Publications, Linguistics 126.). xvii + 557 pp. Berkeley, Los Angeles: University of California Press 1995. US$ 62". Journal of African Languages. 17: 183–195.
- Kossmann, Maarten; Suchard, Benjamin D. (2018). "A Reconstruction of the System of Verb Aspects in Proto-Berbero-Semitic". Bulletin of the School of Oriental and African Studies. 81 (1): 41–56. doi:10.1017/S0041977X17001355. hdl:1887/70770. S2CID 171681222.
- Kouwenberg, N. J. C. (2010). The Akkadian Verb and Its Semitic Background. Eisenbrauns. doi:10.1515/9781575066240. ISBN 9781575066240.
- Levin, Saul (2003). "The Problem of Vowels in Proto-Afrasian, as Reconstructed by Diakonoff and Others". In Bender, M. Lionel; Takács, Gábor; Appleyard, David. L. (eds.). Selected Comparative-Historical Afrasian Linguistic Studies in Memory of Igor M. Diakonoff. Lincom Europa. pp. 275–289. ISBN 3-89586-857-4.
- Lipiński, Edward (2001). Semitic Languages: Outline of a Comparative Grammar. Peeters Publishers. ISBN 978-90-429-0815-4.
- Meyer, Ronny; Wolff, H. Ekkehard (2019). "Afroasiatic Linguistic Features and Typologies". In Wolff, H. Ekkehard (ed.). The Cambridge Handbook of African Linguistics. Cambridge University Press. pp. 246–325. doi:10.1017/9781108283991.010. ISBN 9781108283991. S2CID 166312358.
- Orel, Vladimir (1994). "On Hamito-Semitic Morphology and Morphonology". Orbis. 37: 162–175. doi:10.2143/ORB.37.0.2012773.
- Orel, Vladimir; Stolbova, Olga (1995). Hamito-Semitic Etymological Dictionary. Leiden, Boston, Köln: Brill. ISBN 90-04-10051-2.
- Newman, Paul (1990). Nominal and Verbal Plurality in Chadic. Foris Publications. ISBN 90-6765-499-X.
- Nichols, Johanna (2003). "Diversity and Stability in Language". In Joseph, Brian D; Janda, Richard D. (eds.). The Handbook of Historical Linguistics. Blackwell. pp. 283–310. ISBN 0-631-19571-8.
- Oréal, Else (2023). "Some Common Features of Akkadian and Egyptian Revisited". In Almansa-Villatoro, M. Victoria; Štubňová Nigrelli, Silvia (eds.). Ancient Egyptian and Afroasiatic: Rethinking the Origins. Eisenbrauns. pp. 161–185. ISBN 9781646022120.
- Peust, Carsten (2012). "On the Subgrouping of Afro-Asiatic, or: How to use an unrooted phylogenetic tree in historical linguistics". Lingua Aegyptia. 20: 221–251. doi:10.11588/propylaeumdok.00002498.
- Porkhomovsky, Victor (2020). "Afro-Asiatic Overview". In Vossen, Rainer; Dimmendaal, Gerrit J. (eds.). The Oxford Handbook of African Languages. Oxford University Press. pp. 269–274. ISBN 978-0-19-960989-5.
- Putten, Marijn van (2018). "The feminine endings *-ay and *-āy in Semitic and Berber". Bulletin of the School of Oriental and African Studies. 81 (2): 205–225. doi:10.1017/S0041977X18000447. S2CID 231795581.
- Ratcliffe, Robert R. (1996). "Drift and Noun Plural Reduplication in Afroasiatic". Bulletin of the School of Oriental and African Studies. 59 (2): 296–311. doi:10.1017/S0041977X0003158X. JSTOR 619713. S2CID 161601661.
- Ratcliffe, Robert R. (2012). "On calculating the reliability of the comparative method at long and medium distances: Afroasiatic comparative lexica as a test case". Journal of Historical Linguistics. 2 (2): 239–281. doi:10.1075/jhl.2.2.04rat.
- Rubin, Aaron D. (2004). "AN OUTLINE OF COMPARATIVE EGYPTO-SEMITIC MORPHOLOGY". In Takács, Gábor (ed.). Egyptian and Semito-Hamitic (Afro-Asiatic) Studies in Memoriam Werner Vycich. Brill. doi:10.1163/9789047412236_035.
- Sanker, Chelsea (2023). "Data Limitations and Supplementary Methods in Placing Egyptian". In Almansa-Villatoro, M. Victoria; Štubňová Nigrelli, Silvia (eds.). Ancient Egyptian and Afroasiatic: Rethinking the Origins. Eisenbrauns. pp. 19–34. ISBN 9781646022120.
- Satzinger, Helmut (2004). "Statuses and Cases of the Afroasiatic Personal Pronoun". In Takács, Gábor (ed.). Egyptian and Semito-Hamitic (Afro-Asiatic) Studies in Memoriam W. Vycichl. Brill. pp. 487–498. doi:10.1163/9789047412236_036. ISBN 9789047412236.
- Satzinger, Helmut (2018). "Did Proto-Afroasiatic have Marked Nominative or Nominative-Accusative Alignment?". In Tosco, Mauro (ed.). Afroasiatic: Data and perspectives. Amsterdam: John Benjamins. pp. 11–22. ISBN 9789027264572.
- Shay, Erin (2014). "Afroasiatic". In Lieber, Rochelle; Štekauer, Pavol (eds.). The Oxford Handbook of Derivational Morphology. Oxford University Press. pp. 573–590. doi:10.1093/oxfordhb/9780199641642.013.0032. ISBN 978-0-19-964164-2.
- Schuh, Russell G. (2017). Newman, Paul (ed.). A Chadic Cornucopia (PDF). eScholarship.
- Souag, Lameen (2023). "Restructured or Archaic? The Hunt for Shared Morphological Innovation Involving Egyptian". In Almansa-Villatoro, M. Victoria; Štubňová Nigrelli, Silvia (eds.). Ancient Egyptian and Afroasiatic: Rethinking the Origins. Eisenbrauns. pp. 303–318. ISBN 9781646022120.
- Stauder, Andréas (2023). "Egyptian Morphology in Afroasiatic Perspective". In Almansa-Villatoro, M. Victoria; Štubňová Nigrelli, Silvia (eds.). Ancient Egyptian and Afroasiatic: Rethinking the Origins. Eisenbrauns. pp. 53–136. ISBN 9781646022120.
- Takács, Gabór (1999). Etymological Dictionary of Egyptian. Volume 1: A Phonological Introduction. Leiden, Boston, Köln: Brill. ISBN 90-04-11538-2.
- Takács, Gábor (2008). Etymological Dictionary of Egyptian. Volume 3: m-. Brill. ISBN 978-90-04-16412-3.
- Takács, Gábor (2011). "Semitic-Egyptian Relations". In Weninger, Stefan (ed.). The Semitic Languages: An International Handbook. De Gruyter Mouton. pp. 7–18. doi:10.1515/9783110251586.7. ISBN 978-3-11-018613-0.
- Takács, Gábor (2016). "Layers of the oldest Egyptian lexicon VIII: Numerals". Journal of Language Relationship. 14 (2): 119–151. doi:10.31826/jlr-2017-141-210. S2CID 55439036.
- Voigt, Rainer (2019). "The Pre- and Suffix Conjugations of Semitohamitic". In Voigt, Rainer (ed.). 5000 Jahre semitohamitische Sprachen in Asien und Afrika / 5000 Years of Semitohamitic Languages in Asia and Africa. Rüdiger Köppe Verlag. pp. 21–28. ISBN 978-3-89645-686-1.
- Wilson, David (2020). A Concatenative Analysis of Diachronic Afro-Asiatic Morphology (PDF) (Thesis). University of Pennsylvania.
- Wilson-Wright, Aren M. (2014). "The Word for 'One' in Proto-Semitic". Journal of Semitic Studies. 59 (1): 1–13. doi:10.1093/jss/fgt032.
- Winand, Jean (2023). "Afroasiatic Lexical Comparison: An Egyptologist's Point of View". In Almansa-Villatoro, M. Victoria; Štubňová Nigrelli, Silvia (eds.). Ancient Egyptian and Afroasiatic: Rethinking the Origins. Eisenbrauns. pp. 35–50. ISBN 9781646022120.
- Wolff, H. Ekkehard (2022). "Proto-Chadic reconstruction and Afroasiatic vowel system typology". Brill's Journal of Afroasiatic Languages and Linguistics. 14: 61–100. doi:10.1163/18776930-01401004. S2CID 250140533.
- Zaborski, Andrzej (1987). "Basic Numerals in Cushitic". In Jungraithmayr, Herrmann; Mueller, Walter W. (eds.). Proceedings of the Fourth International Hamito-Semitic Congress. John Benjamins. pp. 317–347.
- Zaborski, Andrzej (2011). "Biradicalism". In Edzard, Lutz; de Jong, Rudolf (eds.). Encyclopedia of Arabic Language and Linguistics. Brill. doi:10.1163/1570-6699_eall_EALL_COM_0046.
