= Jasir =

Jasir can be a given name, a middle name, or a surname. Notable people with the name include:

== Given name ==
- Jasir Asani (born 1995), North Macedonian-born football right winger
- Jasir Selmani (born 1991), North Macedonian football attacking midfielder

== Middle name ==
- Kazim Jasir Faraj, Iraqi poet and journalist
- Suleiman Jasir Al-Herbish, former Director-General of the OPEC Fund for International Development

== Surname ==
- Ahmed Mohamed Jasir, Eritrean politician

== See also ==
- Ja'Sir Taylor (born 1999), American football cornerback
