= Itbay =

Region of southeastern Egypt and northeastern Sudan

Coordinates: 25.6611°N 33.9533°E

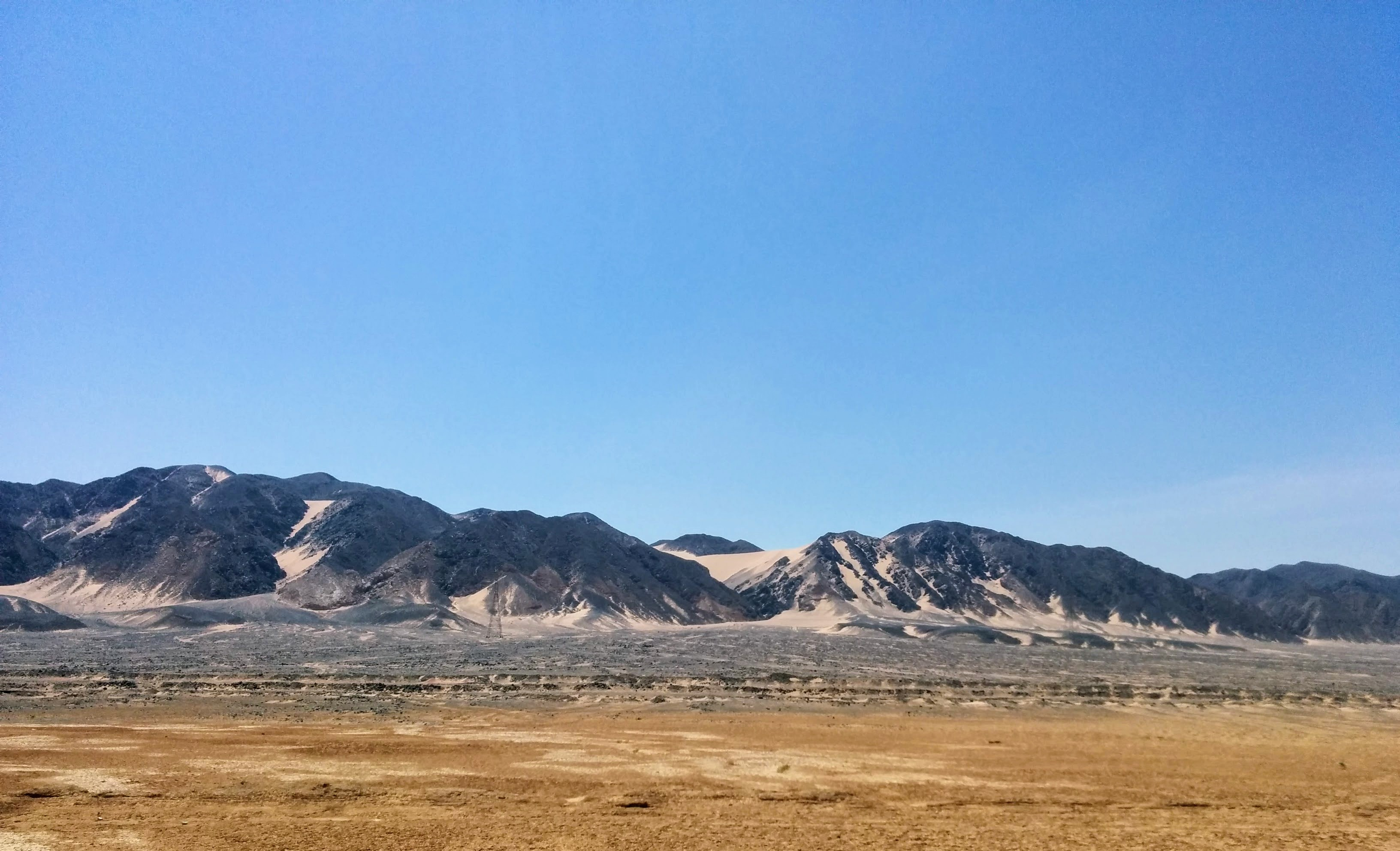
Red Sea Hills in Egypt

Itbāy (Arabic: اطبيه; ʿAtbāy / Atbai ) is a region of southeastern Egypt and northeastern Sudan. It is characterized by a chain of mountains, the Red Sea Hills, running north–south and parallel with the Red Sea. The hills separate the narrow coastal plain from the Eastern Desert.

== Geology ==
The Red Sea Hills are composed of the exposed Neoproterozoic volcano-sedimentary rock of the Arabian-Nubian Shield. Although the rock itself is 550–900 million years old, the mountains were created by uplift when the Red Sea itself was formed in the Oligocene, only some 23–34 million years ago. The Red Sea Hills are thus part of the same formation as the Sarawat Mountains of Saudi Arabia and the mountains of the Sinai Peninsula. The Red Sea Hills rise almost to 3,000 metres (9,800 ft) today, but in the past were much higher. The Oligocene uplift caused the rejuvenation of their streams and the increased erosion removed most of the limestone and sandstone to expose the basement layer.

The Itbāy is arid, receiving less than 200 millimetres (7.9 in) of rainfall each year with high variability. The Barka River, the most significant of the few seasonal streams that flow into the Red Sea, rises in the Red Sea Hills of Sudan and empties into the sea at the Tokar Delta. In prehistoric times it was probably a permanent river.

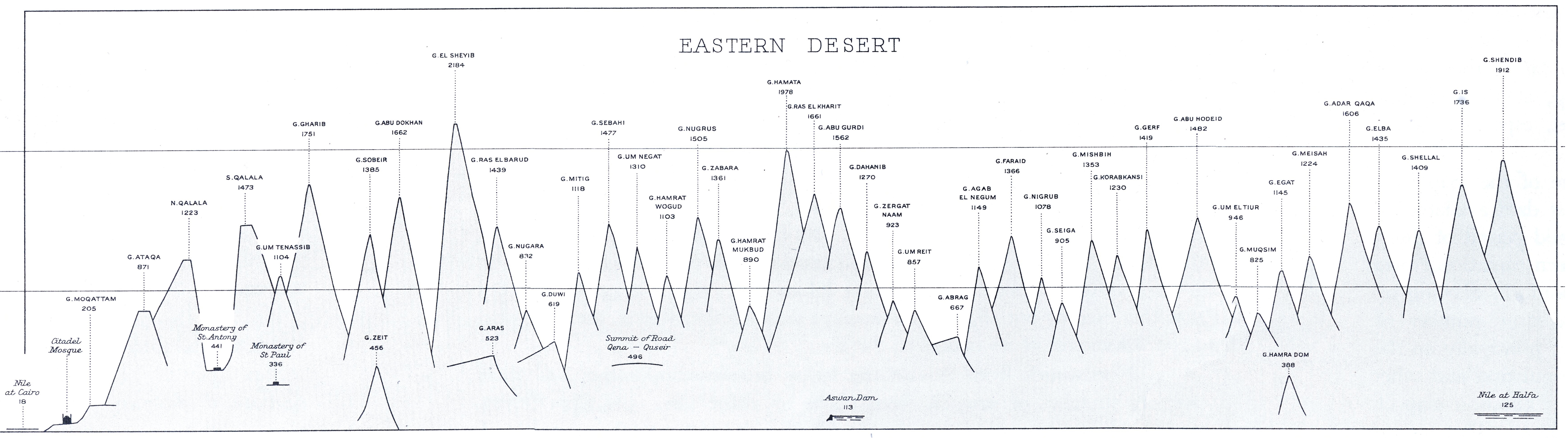
Comparative heights of the principal mountains of Egypt's Eastern Desert.

== History ==
In prehistoric times, the Red Sea Hills were likely the area where the Proto-Cushitic language was spoken.

The Red Sea Hills are a source of porphyry, which was being mined as early as the fourth millennium BC.

The Red Sea Hills are inhabited by the Beja people who speak a Cushitic language and practice pastoralism. They mainly live near the dry riverbeds, wādīs, that flow seasonally into the sea and the Nile, where there is limited vegetation. In antiquity, the Beja were known as the Blemmyes and their presence in the hills is detected archaeologically by the presence of Eastern Desert Ware from the fourth century AD. The material culture of the hills places it firmly within ancient Egypt's sphere of influence. Extensive mining settlements have been found in the Wadi Allaqi and the Wadi Gabgaba. The early Blemmyes built platform tumuli (flat-topped burial mounds), and the appearance of cairns to mark burials in the late Middle Ages may be linked to Islamization.

In 2026, while examining satellite imagery of the area between the Nile and the Red Sea, researchers discovered structures consisting of circular mass graves, some of which have a diameter of up to 80 meters. There are 260 of them. According to scientists, these were built approximately 4,500–6,500 years ago.
