= Highland East Cushitic languages =

Afroasiatic language branch of Ethiopia

Highland East Cushitic
- Sidamic
- Geographic distribution: Ethiopia
- Linguistic classification: Afro-Asiatic: Cushitic; East Cushitic; Highland East Cushitic
- Subdivisions: Burji; Sidamic

Language codes
- Glottolog: high1285

Highland East Cushitic or Burji-Sidamo is a branch of the Afroasiatic language family spoken in south-central Ethiopia. They are often grouped with Lowland East Cushitic, Dullay, and Yaaku as East Cushitic. The most popular language is Sidama, with close to two million speakers.

The languages are:

  - Burji (divergent)
  - Sidamoid (also Sidamic)
    - Sidama
    - Gedeo
    - Hadiyya–Libido
    - Kambaata–Alaba

The four to six Sidamoid languages are all closely related. Hadiyya and Libido are especially close, as are Kambaata and Alaba. Their relationship with Burji is more distant and was first proposed in 1940; it has been accepted widely but not universally.

== Language contact ==
The Highland East Cushitic languages show parallels in their phonology to the historical development of the southern Ethio-Semitic languages, in particular those of the Gurage group, and may have influenced their development.
