= Ahmed Mohamed Jasir =

Eritrean politician (1942–2019)

- Born: 4 January 1942; Irafale, Italian Eritrea
- Died: 21 December 2019 (aged 77); Cairo, Egypt

Ahmed Mohamed Jasir (born 4 January 1942 – 21 December 2019) was an Eritrean politician, is one of the most significant leaders in Eritrean history of struggle for independence from 1958 to 1990.

Ahmed Mohamed Jasir was born in Irafale which is a Red Sea town in Eritrea, in the Horn of Africa. The town is about 80 kilometres south of Massawa, the country's main sea port. Irafale is located in a strategic point as the crossroads between Dankalia, Akli Gozai and Massawa.

== Family background ==
Ahmed Jasir’s father, Mohamed Jasir, according to Ibrahim Dihishi, was the mayor of Irafale and custodian of members of the Eritrean freedom fighters. Ahmed Jasir has one daughter, Mrs Fatima Ahmed Jasir who resides with her husband and children in Australia. He has 5 sisters and 5 brothers. One of Ahmed Jasir’s uncles is Haji Mahmoud Ali Jasir, from Senafe, who was a member of the first Eritrean Parliament and a well known activist of The Eritrean League in the 1950s, who fought for Eritrean Independence and against the Unionists.

Haji Mahmoud Jasir is also the father of late Colonel Abdurahman Mahmoud Jasir, a veteran combatant who joined the Eritrean revolution for independence in 1975 who was Head of Eritrea International Security Office. Abdurahman Jasir's death on 2 March 2013 in Asmara, according to an Aljazeera News broadcast on 2 March 2013; was a mystery and that the government at the time had denied the family’s request for an autopsy. Another cousin of Ahmed Jasir is the late Mohammed Said Jasser (former Manager of Assab Port, Ministry of Transport and Communications). He was one of the first Eritrean high level delegation to Singapore. Ethiopian government seaport related publications reveal that Mohamed Said Jasir had played a huge role in effectively running Ports of Massawa and Assab in the 1970s and 1980s.

== Ethnicity and language ==
Ahmed Jasir, including his native language Saho, fluently spoke in English, Arabic and three Eritrean languages Tigrinya, Tigre and Afar.

== Education ==
After attending local Islamic school and completing a 4th grade in Irafale, Ahmed Jasir joined Hirgigo elementary school. Hirgigo school was founded by Pasha Saleh Ahmed Kekia in 1944 according to Osman Saleh Sabbe. At this time the well known Eritrean leader Osman Saleh Sabbe was teacher and Headteacher of the school. Later on, Ahmed Jasir received various academic, military and intelligence courses in the Middle East and became one of the most confident political and military leaders in which his followers passionately admired and trusted.

== Political activity ==
Ahmed Jasir joined Osman Saleh Sabbe's politically active group, when he was about 16 years old, according to Mohamed Ramadan in. In 1958 he soon became Sabbe's key trusted 'handwriters' of secret revolutionary documents. Ahmed Jasir was involved in contributing to one of the most important Eritrean legal document that was translated from Arabic to English by Sabbe Ibrahim in the late 1950s as described by Dihishi describes in. The legal document was handed over to Sheikh Ibrahim al-Mukhtar, who sought consultation from the Dean of the Faculty of Law at Cairo University, Al-Arabi, who is the father of Nabil Al Arabi, who served as secretary of the Arab League. In November 1957, the Eritrean leaders launched a written complaint to the United Nations and sent delegated Omar Qhadi (a prominent supporter of Eritrean independence from Ethiopia) and Weldeab Weldemariam (a prominent supporter of Eritrea’s union with Ethiopia). The purpose of the mission was to file a formal complaint against Ethiopia for the violation of United Nations resolutions regarding the federal ruling in Eritrea. They returned to Eritrea without success and Qhadi was arrested and put in prison after returning to Eritrea. Many media outlets published in 1950s affirm that Sheikh Ibrahim al-Mukhtar (The Grand Mufti of Eritrea) continued to actively support all causes for Eritrean independence and raised his concerns in international forums. After the imprisonment of the Eritrean lawyer Qhadi, the Mufti had made contacts with key Eritrean political figures at the time and agreed to send a delegation of three people abroad, namely Sheikh Ibrahim Sultan, president of the Islamic League, Mr Idris Mohamed Adam, Speaker of Parliament, and Mr. Mohamed Omar Akito, a member of parliament who apologized for special circumstance.

== Membership of member جمعية العروة الوثقى Aluurwa Alwuthqa ==
Many oral historians believe that the confidence and trust that Osman Saleh Sabbe had established in Ahmed Jasir meant that, before he was exiled from Eritrea, he selected him as his representative and a member of his secret association known as جمعية العروة الوثقى Aluurwa Alwuthqa. The key members of the association, among others, were Saleh Abdul Qadir Bashir, Mohammed Abdul Qadir, Mahmoud Sabi, Sheikh Suleiman and Sheikh Hamed. The association worked secretly in support of efforts of Eritrean independence from Ethiopia as well as ensuring that Eritreans receive higher education in Institution available at the time. Ibrahim Dihishe assesrts that Ahmed Jasir became the youngest member of the Eritrean Liberation Movement. When the activity of the Liberation Movement reached its peak and spread its cells in Eritrea, Ahmed Jasir witnessed the establishment of Irafale secret cell that was headed by Mr Osman Dihishe which had close links with another cell in Senafe which was headed by Mohamed Ibrahim Ayfarah. The two cells and all other secret cells in the country had established links with Eritrean Liberation Front which was led by Idris Awate.

== Exile ==
The Eritrean Liberation Front (ELF) fighters led by Hamid Idris Awate attacked government police stations in the Barka region of Eritrea on 1 September 1961; University of Central Arkansas publication describes this in " Ethiopia/Eritrea (1950-1993)". On 14 November 1962, the Ethiopian Chamber of Deputies voted to abolish the federation with Eritrea, Ethiopia annexed Eritrea on 16 November 1962. Due to risk of being caught by the Haile Silase regime, on 24 September 1964, Ahmed Jasir fled Eritrea to Tiez in Yemen securing bail signed by Mr Ali Higo Mohamed (a former member of the Ethiopian parliament and a former Governor of Massawa in Eritrea, who was abducted from Addis Ababa by the Eritrean regime in July 1991). Ahmed Jasir formed a youth branch with his colleagues such as Hassan Hussein, Abdu Ali Heji and a number of young people, including Yemenis who were born in Eritrea.

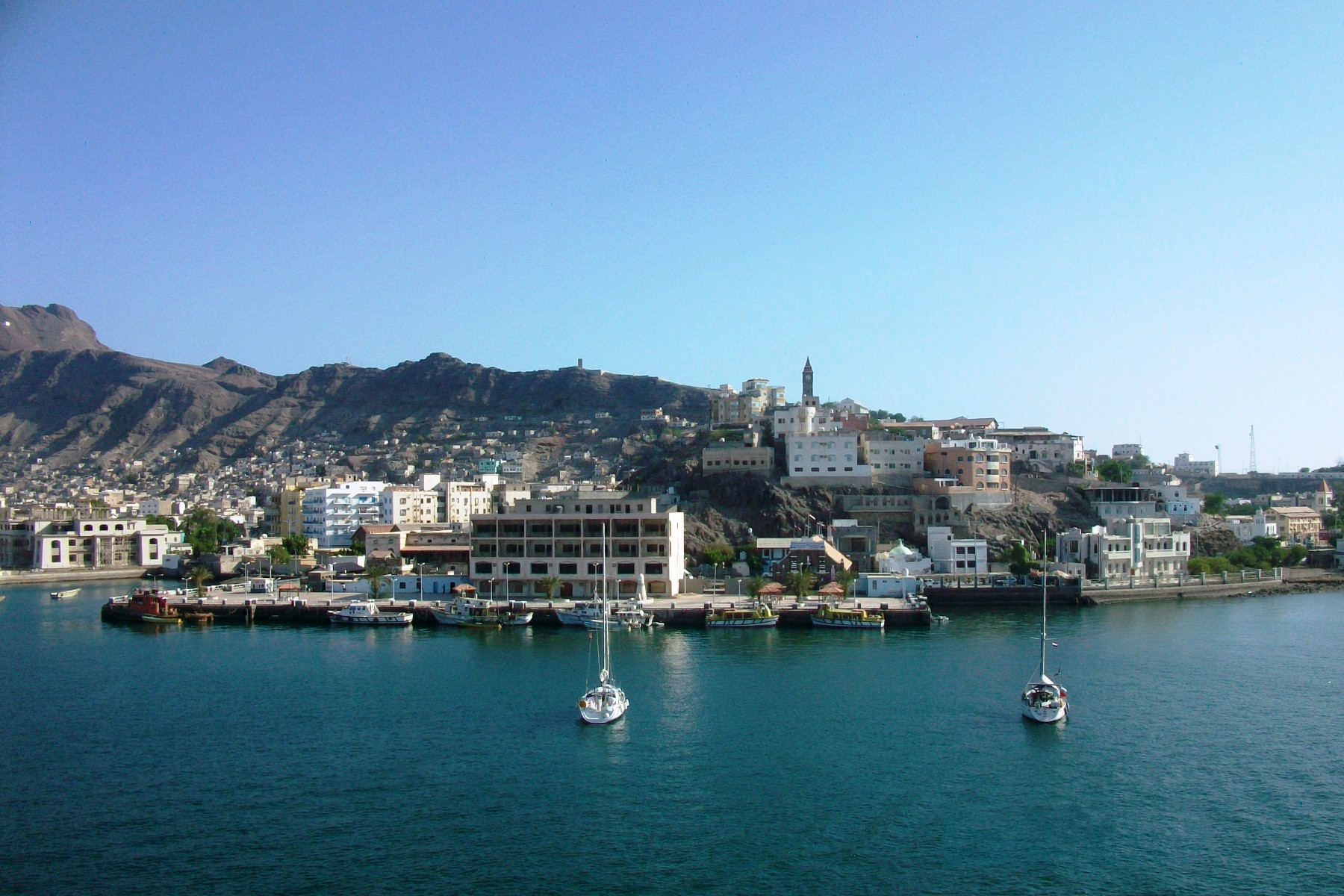
Aden, Yemen

In 1965, Osman Sabbe visited Yemen where he met with Ahmed Jasir who had already established close links with the country's political leaders. Osman Sabbe and Ahmed Jasir met with the President of Yemen Abdullah al-Sallal (9 January 2017 to 5 March 1994). This meeting was the beginning of getting support on which Eritrean Liberation Fronts relied. This meeting was facilitated by Sheikh Ali Hamad who had good links with Ahmed Noman, former Prime Minister of Yemen and Judge Abdul Rahman al-Iryani, then Deputy Prime Minister and Minister of Education.

== Continuing activities ==
In 1967, Ahmed Jasir became in charge of the Eritrean Liberation Front's branch office in Damascus in Syria, and thus becoming one of the most important representatives of Eritrean Fronts in the Middle East. Ahmed Jasir became one of the founders of a secret Eritrean cell, known as ‘Eqaab’ which was founded in 1969 as described by Mohamed Ramadan in. An account of an incident that involves 'the Eqaab' cell is recorded in Aviation Safety Network Database; 9. At around 8.00 pm Tuesday 11 March 1969, where Eqaab group successfully executed an operation where Ethiopian Boeing 707 passenger plane crashed at Frankfurt Airport, in West Germany following the explosion of time bombs placed by fedayeen. West Germany at the time condemned the operation by describing it as criminal act against civil aviation while a statement issued by Eritrean Liberation Front said the operation was in response to the Ethiopian Military using civilian planes to bomb Eritrean villages killing innocent civilians.

=== Libya and massive student scholarship Schemes ===
In 1971, a new dissident forces unhappy with the Eritrean Liberation Front’s manner of operating, formed the Eritrean Liberation Forces–People’s Liberation Forces(ELF-PLF) as cited in. In 1972, Ahmed Jasir, alongside the national leader, Omar Borj, was assigned to Libya's branch as representatives of ELF-PLF in Tripoli. It is well known that Libya has enormously contributed to providing scholarships to thousands of Eritrean students from all parts of Eritrea where they had opportunities to complete their education to university levels in different fields of such as science, medicine, engineering, arts ...etc. Many who graduated and benefited from those opportunities tell that Ahmed Jasir had insisted to continue his mission by supporting Eritrean students throughout the 1980s, particularly those who are most marginalised in refugee camps in Sudan.

=== Head of Media and Public Relations ===
In 1977, Ahmed Jasir became a member of the Executive Committee and Head of Media and Public Relations of the People's Liberation Forces which was led by Osman Saleh Sabbe.

=== Head of Military Affairs ===
Ahmed Jasir was invited to Asmara by the Eritrean regime, like most leaders of various of opposition groups. Most of those returned to Eritrea from exile, were humiliated, imprisoned or fled the country due to the treatment of the Eritrean regime as extensively recorded by the Eritrea Human Rights organisations such as Human Rights Concern Eritrea. Ahmed Jasir had declined all offers to win him over by the regime and decided to return to exile after visiting his mother for a few weeks. He spent most of the rest of two decades in Riyadh, Saudi Arabia earning money by working like thousands of his patriots in exile. He died on 21 December 2019 in Cairo.
