= Ibrahim Mukhtar =

1st Grand mufti of Eritrea (1909–1969)

Sheikh Ibrahim Mukhtar
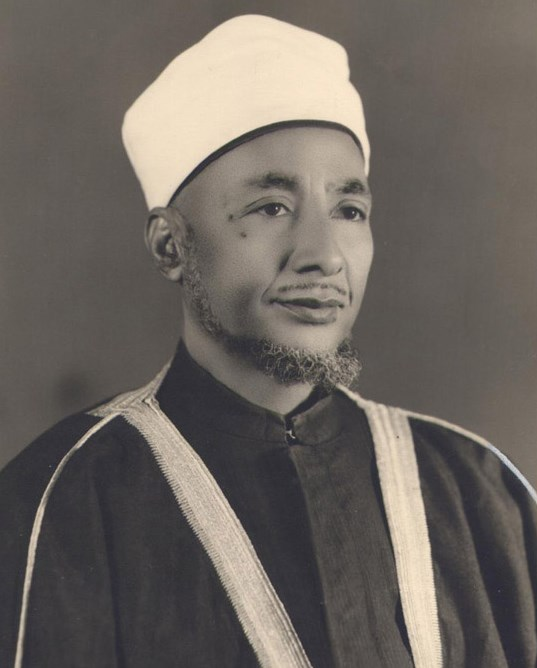
- Sheikh Ibrahim
- Born: 1909
- Died: 1969 (aged 59–60)
- Education: al-Azhar university
- Known for: 1st Grand mufti of Eritrea

Ibrahim Mukhtar (1909 - 1969) was the first Grand Mufti of Eritrea as appointed by the Italian colonial administration. Ibrahim's first language was Saho. He graduated from al-Azhar University in 1937. The Grand Mufti resisted Ethiopian oppression of Eritrea. He however, maintained a pragmatic and delicate balance between outright defiance and his official role as a Muslim community leader under Ethiopian rule. In 1960 he published an article describing the Ethiopian regime in Eritrea as "colonial."

After Sheikh Ibrahim's death, the office of the Grand Mufti of Eritrea was discontinued until August 1992, following the liberation of Eritrea.

Ibrahim Mukhtar was a prolific author, with several dozen unpublished texts about a wide array of religious, historical, linguistic and literary subjects.
