= Marked nominative alignment =

Languages which mark the nominative case and do not mark the accusative

In linguistic typology, marked nominative alignment is an unusual type of morphosyntactic alignment similar to, and often considered a subtype of, a nominative–accusative alignment. In a prototypical nominative–accusative language with a grammatical case system like Latin, the object of a verb is marked for accusative case, and the subject of the verb may or may not be marked for nominative case. The nominative, whether or not it is marked morphologically, is also used as the citation form of the noun. In a marked nominative system, on the other hand, it is the nominative case alone that is usually marked morphologically, and it is the unmarked accusative case that is used as the citation form of the noun. The unmarked accusative (sometimes called absolutive) is typically also used with a wide range of other functions that are associated with the nominative in nominative-accusative languages; they often include the subject complement and a subject moved to a more prominent place in the sentence in order to express topic or focus.

== Distribution ==
Marked nominative languages are relatively rare. They are well-documented in only two regions of the world: in northern Africa, where they occur in many languages of the Cushitic, Omotic and Berber branches of the Afroasiatic family, as well as in the Surmic and Nilotic languages of the Eastern Sudanic family; and in the southwestern United States and adjacent parts of Mexico, where they are characteristic of the Yuman family. Other languages interpreted by some authors as having a marked nominative system include Igbo, Aymara and Wappo. It is also proposed that marked-nominative alignment can be reconstructed for the ancestor of the Afroasiatic languages, viz. Proto-Afroasiatic.

In Yuman and many of the Cushitic languages, however, the nominative is not always marked for reasons that are not known. There may, therefore, be not a strict case system but a reflection of discourse patterns or other non-semantic parameters. However, the Yuman language Havasupai is reported to have a purely syntactic case system, with a suffix -č marking all subjects of transitive and intransitive verbs but not of the copula; in the Nilotic language Datooga, the system is also reported to be purely syntactic.

As in many Nilotic languages, Datooga case is marked by tone. The absolutive case has the unpredictable tone of the citation form of the noun, but the nominative is marked by a characteristic tone that obliterates the lexical tone. The tone is high for words of three syllables or less; for words with four or more syllables, the ends of the word have high tone, with a low tone in the middle of the word.

In most African languages with a marked nominative, the nominative is used for subjects following the verb, the absolutive with the copula, with subjects in focus position before the verb, and in all other situations.

Okinawan, a Japonic language, is generally a marked nominative language where nominative subjects are marked with the case particles ga or nu depending on their level of animacy. Unmarked nouns are by default in the accusative case. However, some verbs of existence and emergence may also have optionally unmarked nominative subjects.

Savosavo, a papuan language spoken in Soloman Islands, marks the nominative case with a clitic at the end of the noun phrase, while there is no accusative case marker.

== See also ==
- Morphosyntactic alignment
- Active language
