= Dahalo language =

Endangered Cushitic language of Kenya

Dahalo
- numma guhooni
- Native to: Kenya
- Region: Coast Province
- Ethnicity: Dahalo people
- Native speakers: 580 (2019)
- Language family: Afro-Asiatic: Cushitic; East? South?; Dahalo

Language codes
- ISO 639-3: dal
- Glottolog: daha1245
- ELP: Dahalo
- Dahalo is classified as Definitely Endangered by the UNESCO Atlas of the World's Languages in Danger (2010)

Dahalo is an endangered Cushitic language spoken by around 500–600 Dahalo people on the coast of Kenya, near the mouth of the Tana River. Dahalo is unusual among the world's languages in using all four airstream mechanisms found in human language: clicks, implosives, ejectives, and pulmonic consonants.

== Name ==
While the language is known primarily as "Dahalo" to linguists, the term itself is an exonym supposedly used by Aweer speakers that itself essentially means “stupid” or “worthless.” The speakers themselves refer to the language as numma guhooni.

Dahalo is also called Sanye, a name shared with neighboring Waata, also spoken by former hunter-gatherers. The Waata may once have spoken a language more like Dahalo before shifting to Oromo.

== History ==
The Dahalo, former elephant hunters, are dispersed among Swahili and other Bantu peoples, with no villages of their own, and are bilingual in those languages. Children no longer learn the language, which would make it moribund, and it may be extinct.

It is suspected that the Dahalo may have once spoken a Sandawe- or Hadza-like language, and that they retained clicks in some words when they shifted to Cushitic, because many of the words with clicks are basic vocabulary. If so, the clicks represent a substratum.

== Classification ==
The classification of Dahalo is obscure. Traditionally included in South Cushitic, Tosco (1991) argues instead that it is East Cushitic, and Kießling (2001) agrees that it has too many Eastern features to be South Cushitic.

== Phonology ==
=== Consonants ===
Dahalo has a highly diverse sound system using all four airstream mechanisms found in human language: clicks, ejectives, and implosives, as well as the universal pulmonic sounds. Nguni languages such as Xhosa and Zulu also use all four airstream mechanisms, although the ejective consonants in these languages are weak, and vary between speakers.

In addition, Dahalo makes a number of uncommon distinctions. It contrasts laminal and apical stops, as in languages of Australia and California; epiglottal and glottal stops and fricatives, as in the Mideast, the Caucasus, and the American Pacific Northwest; and is perhaps the only language in the world to contrast alveolar lateral and palatal lateral fricatives and affricates.

Dahalo has, by all accounts, a large consonant inventory. 62 consonants are reported by Maddieson et al. (1993), whereas Tosco (1991) recognizes 50. The inventory according to the former is presented below:

			Labial	Alveolar			Post- alveolar	Palatal	Velar		Epiglottal	Glottal
			Labial	laminal	apical	labial	Post- alveolar	Palatal	plain	labial	Epiglottal	Glottal
Nasal			**m**	**n**				ɲ				
Nasalized click ^{(1)}		plain		**ᵑʇ**		ᵑʇʷ						
Nasalized click ^{(1)}		glottalized		ᵑʇˀ		ᵑʇˀʷ						
Stop	plain	voiceless	**p**	**t̪**	t͇				**k**	**kʷ**	**ʡ**	**ʔ**
Stop	plain	voiced	**b**	**d̪**	d͇				**ɡ**	ɡʷ		
Stop	plain	ejective	**pʼ**	**t̪ʼ**	t͇ʼ				**kʼ**	kʷʼ		
Stop	plain	implosive	ɓ	**ɗ**								
Stop	prenasalized	voiceless	ᵐp	ⁿt̪	ⁿt͇				ᵑk	ᵑkʷ		
Stop	prenasalized	voiced	ᵐb	ⁿd̪	ⁿd͇	ⁿd͇ʷ			ᵑɡ	ᵑɡʷ		
Affricate	plain	voiceless		ts			tʃ					
Affricate	plain	voiced		dz		dzʷ	**dʒ**					
Affricate	plain	ejective		tsʼ			tʃʼ					
Affricate	lateral	ejective		**tɬʼ**				c𝼆ʼ				
Affricate	prenasalized	voiceless		ⁿts			ᶮtʃ					
Affricate	prenasalized	voiced		ⁿdz			ᶮdʒ					
Fricative		median	**f**	**s** z			ʃ				**ʜ**	**h**
Fricative		lateral			**ɬ͇**	ɬʷ		𝼆				
Approximant				**l**				j		**w̜**		
Trill				**r**								

^{1} The dental clicks are most commonly written ⟨ǀ⟩, but that can be misread as ⟨l⟩. Thus, for legibility, the alternative letter ⟨ʇ⟩ is used here; this is found in a few sources such as Elderkin. They may freely vary as lateral clicks.

Tosco's account differs in not including the labialized clicks, the palatal laterals, and the voiceless prenasalized consonants (on which see below), analyzing /t͇ʼ/ as /tsʼ/, and adding /dɮ/, /ʄ/ and /v/ (which Maddieson et al. believe to be an allophone of /w/).

This typologically extraordinary inventory appears to result from extended contact influence from substratal and superstratal languages, due to long-running bilinguality. Only 27 consonants (shown in bold) are found in the final position of verbal stems, which Tosco suggests represents the inherited Cushitic component of the consonant inventory.

Several phonemes can be shown to be recent intrusions into the language through loanwords:

- /z/ is only found in recent loans from Bantu and can be nativized as /d̪/.
- /tʃʼ/ is only found in loanwords from Swahili.
- /ʃ/ is only found in loanwords from Swahili and Somali.

Additionally, several consonants are marginal in their occurrence. Five are only attested in a single root:

- /ⁿd͇ʷ/
- /ᶮdʒ/, in /kípuᶮdʒu/ 'place where maize is seasoned'
- /ᵑɡʷ/, in /háᵑɡʷaraᵑɡʷára/ 'centipede'
- /ɬʷ/, in /ɬʷaʜ-/ 'to pinch'.
- /j/, in /jáːjo/ 'mother'.

Less than five examples each are known of /ᵑʇˀʷ, tʃ, tsʼ, tʃʼ, kʷʼ, dɮ, ʄ, ⁿd͇, ⁿdz/.

The prenasalized voiceless stops have been analyzed as syllabic nasals plus stops by some researchers. However, one would expect this additional syllable to give Dahalo words additional tonic possibilities, as Dahalo pitch accent is syllable-dependent (see below), and Maddieson et al. report that this does not seem to be the case. Tosco (1991) analyzes these as consonant clusters, on the grounds that Dahalo allows long vowels in open syllables only, and that while words such as /tʃaːⁿda/ 'finger' can be found, only short vowels occur preceding the alleged voiceless prenasalized consonants. He additionally reports fricative and glottalized clusters: /nf/, /nt̪ʼ/, /ntɬʼ/ and /nʔ/.

==== Allophony ====
The laminal coronals are denti-alveolar, whereas the apicals are alveolar tending toward post-alveolar.

When geminate, the epiglottals are a voiceless stop and fricative. In utterance-initial position they may be a partially voiced (negative voice onset time) stop and fricative. However, as singletons between vowels, /ʡ/ is a flap or even an approximant with weak voicing, whereas /ʜ/ is a fully voiced approximant. Other obstruents are similarly affected intervocalically, though not to the same degree.

/b d̪ d͇/ are often opened to approximants [β̞ ð̞ ð͇˕] or weak fricatives [β ð ð͇] between vowels (sometimes a retraction diacritic is used as in ⟨d̠⟩, serving merely to emphasize that it is further back than /d̪/). Initially, they and /ɡ/ are often voiceless, whereas /p t̪ t͇ k/ are fortis (perhaps aspirated). /w̜/ has little rounding.

There is a lot of variability in the voicing of clicks, so this distinction may be being lost. The nasal clicks are nasalized prior to the click release and are voiced throughout; the voiceless clicks usually have about 30ms of voice onset time, but sometimes less. There is no voiceless nasal airflow, but following vowels may have a slightly nasalized onset. Thus these clicks are similar to glottalized nasal clicks in other languages. Voiceless clicks are much more common than voiced clicks.

=== Vowels ===
Dahalo has a symmetric 5-vowel system of pairs of short and long vowels, totaling 10 vowels:

	Front	Back
High	i / iː	u / uː
Mid	e / eː	o / oː
Low	a / aː	

=== Phonotactics ===
Dahalo words are commonly 2–4 syllables long. Syllables are exclusively of the CV pattern, except that consonants may be geminate between vowels. As with many other Afroasiatic languages, gemination is grammatically productive. Voiced consonants partially devoice, and prenasalized stops denasalize when geminated as part of a grammatical function. However, lexical prenasalised geminate stops also occur.

The consonants /b/ and /d̠/ are systematically excluded from the word-initial position.

(It is likely that the glottals and clicks do not occur as geminates, although only a few words with intervocalic clicks are known, such as /ʜáŋ̊|ana/.)

Dahalo has pitch accent, normally with zero to one high-pitched syllables (rarely more) per root word. If there is a high pitch, it is most frequently on the first syllable; in the case of disyllabic words, this is the only possibility: e.g. /ʡani/ head, /pʼúʡʡu/ pierce.

=== Status of clicks ===
Dahalo is one of very few languages outside southern Africa to have phonemic clicks (the others being Sandawe and Hadza in Tanzania and Damin, a ceremonial register of Lardil formerly spoken on Mornington Island in Australia). The clicks in Dahalo are not Cushitic in origin, and may be a remnant of a shift from a non-Cushitic language. Ten Raa shows some slight evidence that speakers of Dahalo once spoke a language similar to Sandawe, which does have clicks. This might explain why clicks are only present in about 40 lexical items, some of which are basic (e.g. "breast," "saliva," and "forest").

Ehret reported that different words had either dental and lateral clicks, while Elderkin reported that these were allophones. It is not clear if an old distinction has merged, or if the place of articulation is variable because there is no distinction to maintain.
