= Afar language =

Afro-Asiatic language native to the Horn of Africa

Afar
- Qafar af, عَفَر أَف
- Pronunciation: [ʕʌfʌɾʌf]
- Native to: Djibouti, Eritrea, Ethiopia
- Region: Horn of Africa
- Ethnicity: Afar
- Native speakers: 2.6 million (2019–2022)
- Language family: Afro-Asiatic: Cushitic; East; Lowland; Saho–Afar; Afar
- Dialects: Aussa; Ba'adu; Central Afar; Northern Afar
- Writing system: Latin

Official status
- Official language in: Ethiopia
- Recognised minority language in: Djibouti; Eritrea

Language codes
- ISO 639-1: aa
- ISO 639-2: aar
- ISO 639-3: aar
- Glottolog: afar1241

Afar, also known as ’Afar af, Qafar af, or عَفَر أَف, is an Afroasiatic language belonging to the Cushitic branch, primarily spoken by the Afar people, native to parts of Djibouti, Eritrea and Ethiopia. It is an official language in Ethiopia and a national language in Djibouti and Eritrea. Afar is officially written in the Latin script and has over 2.6 million speakers.

== Classification ==
Afar is classified within the Cushitic branch of the Afroasiatic family. It is further categorized in the Lowland East Cushitic sub-group, along with Saho and Somali. Its closest relative is the Saho language.

== Geographic distribution ==
The Afar language is spoken as a mother tongue by the Afar people in Djibouti, Eritrea, and the Afar Region of Ethiopia.

According to Ethnologue, there are 2,600,000 total Afar speakers. Of these, 1,280,000 were recorded in the 2007 Ethiopian census, with 906,000 monolinguals registered in the 1994 census.

== Official status ==
In Djibouti, Afar is a recognized national language. It is also one of the broadcasting languages of the Radio Television of Djibouti public network.

In Eritrea, Afar is recognized as one of nine national languages which formally enjoy equal status although Tigrinya and Arabic are by far of greatest significance in official usage. There are daily broadcasts on the national radio and a translated version of the Eritrean constitution. In education, however, Afar speakers prefer Arabic – which many of them speak as a second language – as the language of instruction.

In the Afar Region of Ethiopia, Afar is also recognized as an official working language. Since 2020, Afar is one of the five official working languages of Ethiopia.

== Phonology ==
=== Consonants ===
The consonants of the Afar language in the standard orthography are listed below in angle brackets (preceded by the IPA notation):

Consonants
		Labial	Alveolar	Retroflex	Palatal	Velar	Pharyngeal	Glottal
Plosive	voiceless		t ⟨t⟩			k ⟨k⟩		
Plosive	voiced	b ⟨b⟩	d ⟨d⟩	ɖ ⟨x⟩		ɡ ⟨g⟩		
Fricative	voiceless	f ⟨f⟩	s ⟨s⟩				ħ ⟨c⟩	h ⟨h⟩
Fricative	voiced						ʕ ⟨q⟩	
Nasal		m ⟨m⟩	n ⟨n⟩					
Approximant		w ⟨w⟩	l ⟨l⟩		j ⟨y⟩			
Tap			ɾ ⟨r⟩					

Voiceless stop consonants which close syllables are released, e.g., [ʌkʰˈme].

/ɖ/ may be realized as a tap [ɽ] or lose its retroflexion as [d] in certain dialects.

=== Vowels and stress ===
	Front		Central	Back	
	short	long	long	short	long
Close	i ⟨i⟩	iː ⟨ii⟩		u ⟨u⟩	uː ⟨uu⟩
Mid	e ⟨e⟩	eː ⟨ee⟩		o ⟨o⟩	oː ⟨oo⟩
Open			aː ⟨aa⟩	ʌ ⟨a⟩	

Sentence final vowels of affirmative verbs are aspirated (and stressed), e.g.

- Afar: abeh = /aˈbeʰ/ 'He did.'

Sentence final vowels of negative verbs are not aspirated (nor stressed), e.g.

- Afar: maabinna = /ˈmaːbinːaː/ 'He did not do.'

Sentence final vowels of interrogative verbs are lengthened (and stressed), e.g.

- Afar: abee? = /aˈbeː/ 'Did he do?'

Otherwise, stress in word-final.

=== Phonotactics ===
Possible syllable shapes are V, VV, VC, VVC, CV, CVV and CVVC.

== Syntax ==
As in most other Cushitic languages, the basic word order in Afar is subject–object–verb.

== Writing system ==
In Ethiopia, Afar used to be written with the Ge'ez script (Ethiopic script). Since around 1849, the Latin script has been used in other areas to transcribe the language. Additionally, Afar is also transcribed using the Arabic script.

In the early 1970s, two Afar intellectuals and nationalists, Dimis and Redo, formalized the Latin-based Afar alphabet, known as Qafar Feera.

Officials from the Institut des Langues de Djibouti, the Eritrean Ministry of Education, and the Ethiopian Afar Language Studies and Enrichment Center have since worked with Afar linguists, authors and community representatives to select a standard orthography for Afar from among the various existing writing systems used to transcribe the language.

=== Latin alphabet ===
Afar alphabet
IPA	Djibouti, Ethiopia	Eritrea	Arabic equivalent
/a/	A a		ا
/b/	B b		ب
/t/	T t		ت
/s/	S s		ث
/e/	E e		-
/ħ/	C c	X x	ح
/k/	K k		خ
/ɖ/	X x	Dh dh	ظ/ض
/i/	I i		-
/d/	D d		د
/ʕ/	Q q	C c	ع
/r/	R r		ر
/f/	F f		ف
/g/	G g		ق
/o/	O o		-
/l/	L l		ل
/m/	M m		م
/n/	N n		ن
/u/	U u		-
/w/	W w		و
/h/	H h		ه
/j/	Y y		ي

Long vowels are represented by doubling. The letters P p, J j, V v and the digraphs Ch ch, Kh kh, Sh sh are used in loanwords.

== See also ==
- Afar Region

== Bibliography ==
- Bliese, Loren F. (1976). "Afar". In Bender, Lionel M. (ed.). The Non-Semitic Languages of Ethiopia. Ann Arbor: African Studies Center, Michigan State University. pp. 133–164.
- Bliese, Loren F. (1981). A generative grammar of Afar. Summer Institute of Linguistics publications in linguistics. Vol. 65. Dallas: Summer Institute of Linguistics and The University of Texas at Arlington. ISBN 0-88312-083-6.
- Colby, James G. (1970). "Notes on the northern dialect of the Afar language". Journal of Ethiopian Studies. 8 (1): 1–8. JSTOR 41965797.
- Hayward, R. J.; Parker, Enid M. (1985). Afar-English-French dictionary with Grammatical Notes in English. London: School of Oriental and African Studies, University of London. ISBN 978-0-7286-0124-6.
- Hayward, Richard J. (1998). "Qafar (West Cushitic)". In Spencer, Andrew; Zwicky, Arnold M. (eds.). Handbook of Morphology. Oxford: Blackwell. pp. 624–647. doi:10.1002/9781405166348.ch29. ISBN 978-0-631-22694-9.
- Morin, Didier (1997). Poésie traditionnelle des Afars. Langues et cultures africaines. Vol. 21. Paris: Peeters. ISBN 978-2-87723-363-7.
- Parker, Enid M. (2006). English–Afar Dictionary. Washington DC: Dunwoody Press. ISBN 978-1-931546-23-2.
- Voigt, Rainer M. (1975). "Bibliographie des Saho–Afar". Africana Marburgensia. 8: 53–63.
