= Saho–Afar languages =

Dialect-cluster belonging to the Cushitic branch of the Afro-Asiatic family

Saho–Afar
- Geographic distribution: Eritrea, Ethiopia, Djibouti
- Linguistic classification: Afro-Asiatic: Cushitic; East; Lowland; Saho–Afar
- Subdivisions: Afar; Saho

Language codes
- Glottolog: saho1245

The Saho–Afar languages (also known as Afar–Saho) are a dialect-cluster belonging to the Cushitic branch of the Afro-Asiatic family. They include the Afar and Saho languages, which are spoken in Djibouti, Eritrea and Ethiopia.

Characteristic features of Saho-Afar include the following:

- Preservation of the pharyngeal fricatives /ħ/ and /ʕ/
- Consistent Subject-Object-Verb word order
- Unique numerals '7' and '8': Saho malħin, baħar, Afar malħina, baħra.
- A contrast of high and low tone; gender is often marked by a high-low tone pattern on masculine nouns, low-high on feminine nouns, e.g. báḍà 'son', bàḍá 'daughter'.
- The Cushitic prefix conjugation is used commonly (ca. 40% of the vocabulary), and is also applied to loanwords from Ethiopian Semitic languages.
- A general negative prefix má- is used in both the imperative and declarative moods. The past tense of suffix-conjugated verbs uses in addition a single negative suffix for both, the present tense lacks a distinct negative suffix entirely.
