= Hans-Jürgen Sasse =

German linguist (1943–2015)

- Born: April 30, 1943; Berlin, Germany
- Died: January 14, 2015 (aged 71)

Academic background
- Education: LMU Munich (PhD)
- Thesis: Linguistische Analyse des arabischen Dialekts der Mhallamiye in der Provinz Mardin (Südosttürkei)

Academic work
- Discipline: Linguist
- Sub-discipline: Linguistic typology; Language documentation
- Institutions: LMU Munich; University of Cologne

Hans-Jürgen Sasse (30 April 1943 in Berlin – 14 January 2015) was a German linguist.

== Life ==
Sasse studied linguistics, Indo-European, Semitics and Balkanology at the Free University of Berlin, the Aristotle University of Thessaloniki and LMU Munich. He was awarded a Ph.D. in 1970 at LMU Munich by the Department of Semitic Languages for his dissertation Linguistische Analyse des arabischen Dialekts der Mhallamiye in der Provinz Mardin (Südosttürkei). From 1972 to 1977, he was a research assistant at the Institut für Allgemeine und Indogermanische Sprachwissenschaft (Institute for General and Indo-European Linguistics) at LMU Munich. In 1975, he received his habilitation with the book Die Morphophonologie des Galab-Verbs, and became professor in 1977. In 1987, he became chair of general and comparative linguistics at the University of Cologne. Sasse retired in the winter semester 2008/2009.

Sasse was cofounder of the "Documentation of Endangered Languages" (DOBES) initiative of the Volkswagen Foundation. In 2001, he was elected a full member of the North Rhine-Westphalian Academy of Sciences, Humanities and the Arts. His obituary cites him as a "pioneer of modern language documentation, [and] master in language documentation and linguistic theory".

== Achievements ==
Sasse was concerned with grammatical relations and lexical categories, language universals, discourse, and grammar, historical linguistics and reconstruction. He also conducted research on language contact and language death, as well as the lexicon. Among the languages and language families on which he conducted research were languages of the Balkans (especially Modern Greek and Albanian), Afro-asiatic languages (especially Semitic languages and Cushitic languages - particularly the Burji language), and Native American languages (especially Iroquoian languages). His work was based on numerous fieldwork studies.
