= Yaaku language =

Endangered Afro-Asiatic language of Kenya

Yaaku
- Mogogodo
- Native to: Kenya
- Region: Laikipia District
- Ethnicity: Yaaku
- Native speakers: 10 (2016)
- Language family: Afro-Asiatic: Cushitic; East; Lowland East; Omo–Tana?; West?; Yaaku

Language codes
- ISO 639-3: muu
- Glottolog: yaak1241
- ELP: Yaaku

Yaaku (also known as Mukogodo, Mogogodo, Mukoquodo, Siegu, Yaakua, Ndorobo) is a moribund Afroasiatic language of the Cushitic branch, spoken in Kenya. Speakers are all older adults.

The classification of Yaaku within Cushitic is disputed, though it is usually placed somewhere within East Cushitic. It is lexicostatistically distinct, having been influenced by Maasai and perhaps also by an unknown substratum, but it shows closest resemblance with the Arboroid languages. Bender (2020) includes it as a member of Arboroid.

== Language situation ==
The Yaaku people are former hunter-gatherers and bee-keepers. They adopted the pastoralist culture of the Maasai in the first half of the twentieth century, although some still keep bees. As a result, the Yaaku almost completely gave up their language for the Maa language of the dominant Maasai tribe (including the Samburu) between 1925 and 1936. The variety of Maa they speak is called Mukogodo-Maasai. Old Yaaku words are still found in bee-keeping vocabulary, for example:

- [sɪka] — 'honey' (cf. Maasai en-aisho o lotorrok)
- [íno] — 'greater honeyguide (Indicator indicator)' (compare Maasai n-cɛshɔrɔ-î)
- [kantála] — 'wooden honey container (about 60 cm)'

A language-revival movement has started among the Yaaku in recent years, aiming to strengthen the Yaaku identity. In early 2005, Maarten Mous, Hans Stoks and Matthijs Blonk visited Doldol on the invitation of a special Yaaku committee, to determine whether there is enough knowledge of Yaaku left among the people to revive the language. This visit has shown there are few truly fluent Yaaku speakers left, all very old: two women called Roteti and Yaponay, respectively, and a man called Legunai. The latter two are both of the Terito age set, which means that they must be around a hundred years old. Knowledge of vocabulary is much wider spread in the community. Full language revival is improbable because of the scarcity of fluent speakers, but one of the possibilities for a partial revival is to use Yaaku vocabulary in the framework of Maa grammar, a strategy that is analogous to the making of Mbugu, a mixed language of the Usambara mountains in Tanzania.
