= Saho language =

Cushitic language spoken in Eritrea and Ethiopia

Saho
- Saho
- Native to: Eritrea, Ethiopia
- Region: Southern, Northern and Southern Red Sea regions in Eritrea, Tigray in Ethiopia
- Ethnicity: Saho, Irobs
- Native speakers: 180,000 (2007–2022)
- Language family: Afro-Asiatic: Cushitic; East; Lowland; Saho–Afar; Saho
- Writing system: Geʽez script (Used in Ethiopia); Latin alphabet (Used in Eritrea)

Official status
- Recognised minority language in: Eritrea

Language codes
- ISO 639-3: ssy
- Glottolog: saho1246

The Saho language (Tigrinya: ሳሆ/ቋንቋ ሳሆ) is a Cushitic language of the Afro-Asiatic language family spoken in Eritrea and Ethiopia.

== Overview ==
Saho is spoken natively by the Saho people. Traditionally, they inhabit the territory in Eritrea bounded by the bay of Erafayle (ዓራፋሊ) in the east, the Laacasi Gade (ላዐሲ ጋደ) valleys in the south, and the Eritrean Highlands to the west (the Shimejana district on the eastern flank of the South- or Debub region in what was formerly known as Akele Guzai province).

This speech area is bordered by other Afro-Asiatic-speaking communities, with Tigre speakers on the west and Afar speakers on the east. In Ethiopia, Saho is primarily spoken in the Tigray Region. It has about 250,000 speakers in total and four main dialects: Northern dialect, mainly spoken by Casawurta (ዓሳኣዉርታ), Tharuuca (ጣሩዓ), Casabat Care (ዓሳባት ካረ), etc.; Central dialect is mainly spoken by Faqhat Xarak (ፋቃት ሓራክ) of Minifere (ሚኒ ፊረ); Southern dialect mainly spoken by Minifire (ሚኒ ፊረ), Xazo (ሓዞ/ዶ), Dabrti-meela ዳብሪ መላ), Irob (ኢሮብ), Sancafe (ሳንዓፈ).

The Saho also use the Arabic (special now Latin letters) to document their history and render information.

The Saho language in former Italian Eritrea has received a strong influence of Italian loanwords.

Saahot Makaado is an online initiative to preserve the usage of Saho, and publishes articles and videos in the language on its website.

Saho is so closely related to the Cushitic Afar language, spoken as a mother tongue by the Afar people, that some linguists regard the two tongues as dialects of a single "Saho–Afar language". Regardless, it has been shown that at least in their basic lexicon the two can be cleanly separated.

== Phonology ==
=== Consonants ===
		Labial	Dental/ Alveolar	Retroflex	Dorsal	Pharyngeal/ Epiglottal	Glottal
Plosive	voiceless		t̪		k	ʡ	(ʔ)
Plosive	voiced	b	d̪	ɖ	g		
Plosive	ejective		(t̪ʼ)		(kʼ)		
Fricative	voiceless	f	s			ħ	h
Fricative	voiced		(z)			(ʕ)	
Fricative	ejective		(sʼ)				
Nasal		m	n				
Rhotic			ɾ				
Approximant		w	l		j		

- Sounds /t̪ʼ, sʼ, z, kʼ, ʔ/ are exclusive to loanwords.
- /b/ can be heard as [β] when in intervocalic positions or when preceding a fricative consonant.
- /t̪, d̪/ can be heard as laminal [t̻, d̻] when before or after /a/.
- /ɾ/ can be heard as a trill [r] in free variation.
- /ɖ/ can be heard as a flap [ɽ] in intervocalic positions.
- /l/ can be heard as apical [l̺] or alveolar [l] when before vowels /i, u/, and as laminal [l̻] when before vowels /a, e, o/.
- /n/ when preceding sounds /b, f, ɖ, k, ɡ/ can be heard as [m, ɱ, ɳ, ŋ].
- /ʡ/ can also be heard as a fricative [ʕ] in free variation or in intervocalic position.
- Stops /b, t̪, d̪, ɖ/ are heard as unreleased [b̚, t̪̚, d̪̚, ɖ̚] when in word-final position.

=== Vowels ===
	Front	Central	Back
Close	i iː		u uː
Mid	ɛ ɛː		ɔ ɔː
Open		a aː	

- /ɛ/ can be heard as either [ɛ] or [e], and may occur as [ə] when in unstressed positions.
- /ɔ/ may be pronounced as either [ɔ] or [o] among speakers across dialects.

== Writing systems ==
Saho has three written versions: a version in the Latin alphabet, official in Eritrea; a version in the Ge'ez script, official in Ethiopia; and a version in the Ajami script with no official recognition.
