= North Omo Zone =

Zone in the Southern Nations, Nationalities, and Peoples' Region, Ethiopia

Coordinates: 6°30′N 37°15′E

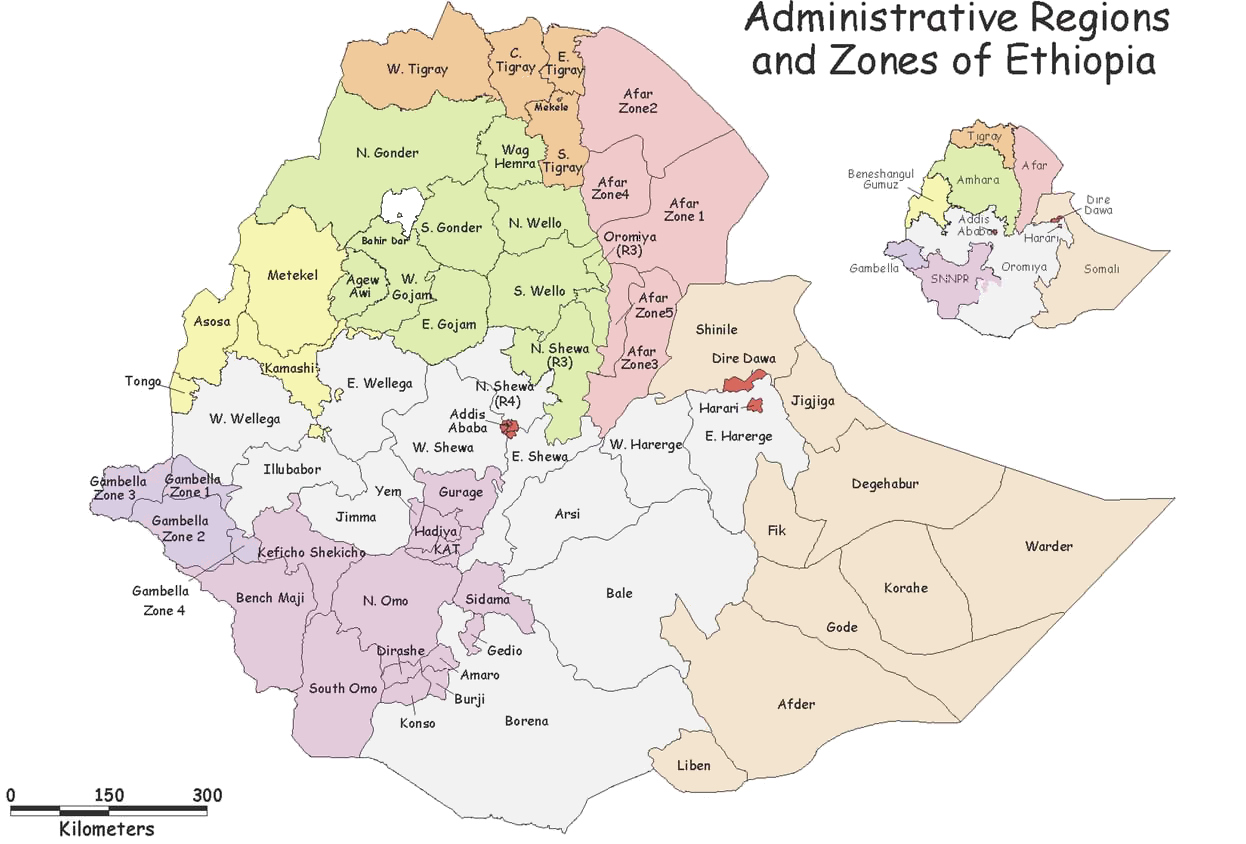
A 2000 map of the regions and zones of Ethiopia showing the North Omo zone in the SNNPR

A map of the regions and zones of Ethiopia since 2023. The SNNPR region is now 4 new regional states

North Omo Zone (Amharic: ሰሜን ኦሞ) was a zone in the Southern Nations, Nationalities, and Peoples' Region of Ethiopia. It was named after the Omo River, which flows in the western area of the former zone. In 2000 it was split into three zones: Dawro, Gamo Gofa, and Wolayita; and Basketo and Konta became special woredas.

Semien Omo was bordered on the south by Debub Omo, on the west by Keficho Shekicho, on the northwest by the Oromia Region, on the north by Kembata Tembaro, on the northeast by part of the Oromia Region, on the east by the Bilate River which separated it from Sidama and another part of the Oromia Region, and on the southeast by the Amaro and Dirashe special woredas. The highest point in Semien Omo was Mount Guge (3568 m), west of Chencha. The administrative center of Semien Omo was Arba Minch; other towns included Areka, Boditi, Sawla and Sodo.

== Overview ==
The Central Statistical Agency (CSA) reported that 8,364 tons of coffee were produced in Semien Omo in the year ending in 2005, based on inspection records from the Ethiopian Coffee and Tea authority. This represents 7.27% of the SNNPR's output and 3.7% of Ethiopia's total output.

The Semien Omo Zone was established in 1987 by the Derg, who created the administrative unit from parts of Gamu-Gofa, Sidamo and Kaffa, based on the conclusion that the four ethnic groups—the Goffa, Gamo, Kullo and Welayta -- all spoke minor variants of the same language and shared other aspects of their cultures. The only changes the Transitional Government of Ethiopia made to it after assuming power, were to remove Konso special woreda from the Zone and add Basketo. However friction between these groups, which was often blamed on the Welayta for "ethnic chauvinism" and despite the efforts of the ruling party to emphasize the need to co-ordinate, consolidate, and unify the smaller ethnic units to achieve the "efficient use of scarce government resources", eventually led to the division of the Zone in 2000 into three new Zones and two special woredas. Despite the central government conceding to this demand, Sarah Vaughan notes, "this may not be the end of the story": a formal request has been made by the Gofa to form their own Zone from the Gamo Gofa Zone, and the Oyda who live in that zone, in June 2002 petitioned for the creation of their own special woreda.

== Demographics ==
Based on figures from the CSA in 2005, this zone has an estimated total population of 3,741,304, of whom 1,853,003 are men and 1,888,301 are women; 319,493 or 8.5% of its population are urban dwellers. With an estimated area of 23,911.03 square kilometers, Semien Omo has an estimated population density of 156.47 people per square kilometer.

In the 1994 Census Semien Omo had a population of 2,603,057, in 554,618 households, of whom 1,289,763 were men and 1,313,294 women; 176,339 or 6.77% of its population were urban dwellers. The largest ethnic groups reported in this Zone included the Welayta (44.17%), the Gamo (26.65%), the Kullo (10.15%), the Gofa (9.12%), the Basketo (1.87%), the Konta (1.86%), and the Amhara (1.84%); all other ethnic groups made up 4.34% of the population. Welayta is spoken as a first language by 44.27% of the inhabitants, 25.88% speak Gamo, 10.22% Kullo, 8.86% Gofa, 2.27% Amharic, 2.14% Basketo, and 1.8% Konta; the remaining 4.56% spoke all other primary languages reported. 39.02% of the population said they practiced Ethiopian Orthodox Christianity, 35.75% were Protestants, 18.58% observed traditional religions, and 2.88% embraced Catholicism.

According to a 24 May 2004 World Bank memorandum, 4% of the inhabitants of Semien Omo have access to electricity, this zone has a road density of 36.4 kilometers per 1000 square kilometers (compared to the national average of 30 kilometers), the average rural household has 0.4 hectare of land (compared to the national average of 1.01 hectare of land and an average of 0.89 for the SNNPR) the equivalent of 0.4 heads of livestock. 29.7% of the population is in non-farm related jobs, compared to the national average of 25% and a Regional average of 32%. 67% of all eligible children are enrolled in primary school, and 21% in secondary schools. 83% of the zone is exposed to malaria, and 28% to Tsetse fly. The memorandum gave this zone a drought risk rating of 322.

== Woredas ==
- Arba Minch Zuria (Now part of the Gamo Zone.)
- Basketo (Now the Basketo special woreda.)
- Boloso Sore (Now part of the Wolayita Zone.)
- Bonke (Now part of the GamoZone.)
- Boreda Abaya (Now part of the Gamo Zone.)
- Chencha (Now part of the Gamo Zone.)
- Damot Gale (Now part of the Wolayita Zone.)
- Damot Weyde (Now part of the Wolayita Zone.)
- Dita (Now part of the Gamo Zone.)
- Deramalo (Now part of the Gamo Zone.)
- Ela (Now the Konta special woreda.)
- Gofa Zuria (Now part of the Gofa Zone.)
- Humbo (Now part of the Wolayita Zone.)
- Isara Tocha (Now part of the Dawro Zone.)
- Kemba (Now part of the Gamo Zone.)
- Kindo Koysha (Now part of the Wolayita Zone.)
- Kucha (Now part of the Gamo Zone.)
- Loma Bosa (Now part of the Dawro Zone.)
- Mareka Gena (Now part of the Dawro Zone.)
- Melokoza (Now part of the Gamo Zone.)
- Offa (Now part of the Wolayita Zone.)
- Sodo Zuria (Now part of the Wolayita Zone.)
- Zala Ubamale (Now part of the Gofa Zone.)
