= Zala Ubamale =

Former woreda in Ethiopia

Coordinates: 6°05′N 37°00′E

Zala Ubamale was one of the 77 woredas in the Southern Nations, Nationalities, and Peoples' Region of Ethiopia. Part of the Gamo Gofa Zone, Zala Ubamale was bordered on the south and west by the Debub Omo Zone, on the northwest by Gofa Zuria, on the northeast by Kucha, on the east by Dita Dermalo and on the southeast by Kemba. Towns in Zala Ubamale included Beto and Meleante. Zala Ubamale was divided for Uba Debretsehay and Zala woredas.

The highest point in this woreda was Mount Argun (3418 meters), which lies near the border with the Debub Omo Zone.

== Demographics ==
Based on figures published by the Central Statistical Agency in 2005, this woreda has an estimated total population of 109,064, of whom 53,437 are men and 55,627 are women; 5,500 or 5.04% of its population are urban dwellers, which is less than the Zone average of 8.5%. With an estimated area of 1,301.72 square kilometers, Zala Ubamale has an estimated population density of 83.8 people per square kilometer, which is less than the Zone average of 156.5.

The 1994 national census reported a total population for this woreda of 76,555 of whom 39,073 were men and 37,482 were women; 3,036 or 3.97% of its population were urban dwellers. The five largest ethnic groups reported in Zala Ubamale were the Gezo (50.34%), the Gofa (30.34%), the Aari (11.5%), the Male (2.64%), the Amhara (2.18%), and the Gamo (0.72%); all other ethnic groups made up 2.28% of the population. Gezo is spoken as a first language by 73.51%, 12.13% Aari, 8.01% Oyda, 3.28% Male, and 1.76% spoke Amharic; the remaining 1.76% spoke all other primary languages reported.
