= Boreda Abaya =

Former district in Southern Nations, Nationalities, and Peoples' Region, Ethiopia

Coordinates: 6°20′N 37°15′E

Boreda Abaya was one of the 77 woredas in the Southern Nations, Nationalities, and Peoples' Region of Ethiopia. Part of the Semien Omo Zone, Boreda Abaya was bordered on the south by Arba Minch Zuria, on the southwest by Chencha, on the west by Kucha, on the north by Humbo, and on the east by Lake Abaya which separates it from the Oromia Region. Aruro Island, the largest island in Lake Abaya, was administratively part of this woreda. Towns in Boreda Abaya included Birbir and Zefene. Boreda Abaya was separated for Boreda and Mirab Abaya woredas.

Arnold Weinholt Hodson passed through Boreda soon after he had begun his career as the British resident in southern Ethiopia (1914-1923). At the time, it was under the government of Likamaquas Habte Mikael. As for the terrain, Hodson described it as "extremely hilly, and rises to an elevation of nearly 7000 feet."

== Demographics ==
Based on figures published by the Central Statistical Agency in 2005, this woreda has an estimated total population of 142,178, of whom 71,182 were men and 70,996 were women; 7,866 or 5.53% of its population are urban dwellers, which is less than the Zone average of 8.5%. With an estimated area of 1,322.04 square kilometers, Boreda Abaya has an estimated population density of 107.5 people per square kilometer, which is less than the Zone average of 156.5.

The 1994 national census reported a total population for this woreda of 99,687 of whom 49,814 were men and 49,873 were women; 4,341 or 4.35% of its population were urban dwellers. The four largest ethnic groups reported in Boreda Abaya were the Gamo (83.74%), the Welayta (10.06%), the Kachama (2.62%), and the Amhara (2.6%); all other ethnic groups made up 0.98% of the population. Gamo is spoken as a first language by 83.22%, Welayta 10.05%, 3.43% Amharic, and 2.6% speak Kachama; the remaining 0.7% spoke all other primary languages reported.
