= Zala =

Zala or Zaļā may refer to:

== People ==
- Zala (given name)
- Zala (surname)

== Places ==
=== Angola ===
- Zala, Angola, a town and commune in the province of Bengo

=== Ethiopia ===
- Zala (woreda), a woreda (district) in the Gamo Gofa Zone of the Southern Nations, Nationalities, and Peoples' Region
- Zala Ubamale, a woreda in the Southern Nations, Nationalities, and Peoples' Region of Ethiopia
- Zala, a village in the Degol Woyane tabia in Tigray Region

=== Hungary ===
- Zala County (former)
- Zala County
- Zala (river)
- Zala (village), Somogy County

=== Latvia ===
- Zaļā Manor, a manor house in Courland
- Zaļenieki Manor, also called Zaļā Manor, a manor house near Jelgava

=== Slovenia ===
- Zala, Cerknica, a settlement in the Municipality of Cerknica
- Zala, Železniki, a settlement in the Municipality of Železniki

=== Tibet ===
- Zala, Tibet, a village in the Tibet Autonomous Region of China

== Other uses ==
- Zala Park, Zanzibar
- ZALA Aero Group, a Russian company specialising in drone development
