= 2024 Gofa landslides =

Double-landslide in southern Ethiopia

- Date: 21–22 July 2024
- Location: Kencho-Shacha locality, Geze Gofa, Gofa Zuria, Ethiopia; 6°22′30″N 36°47′24″E
- Cause: Heavy rains
- Deaths: 257
- Injuries: 12

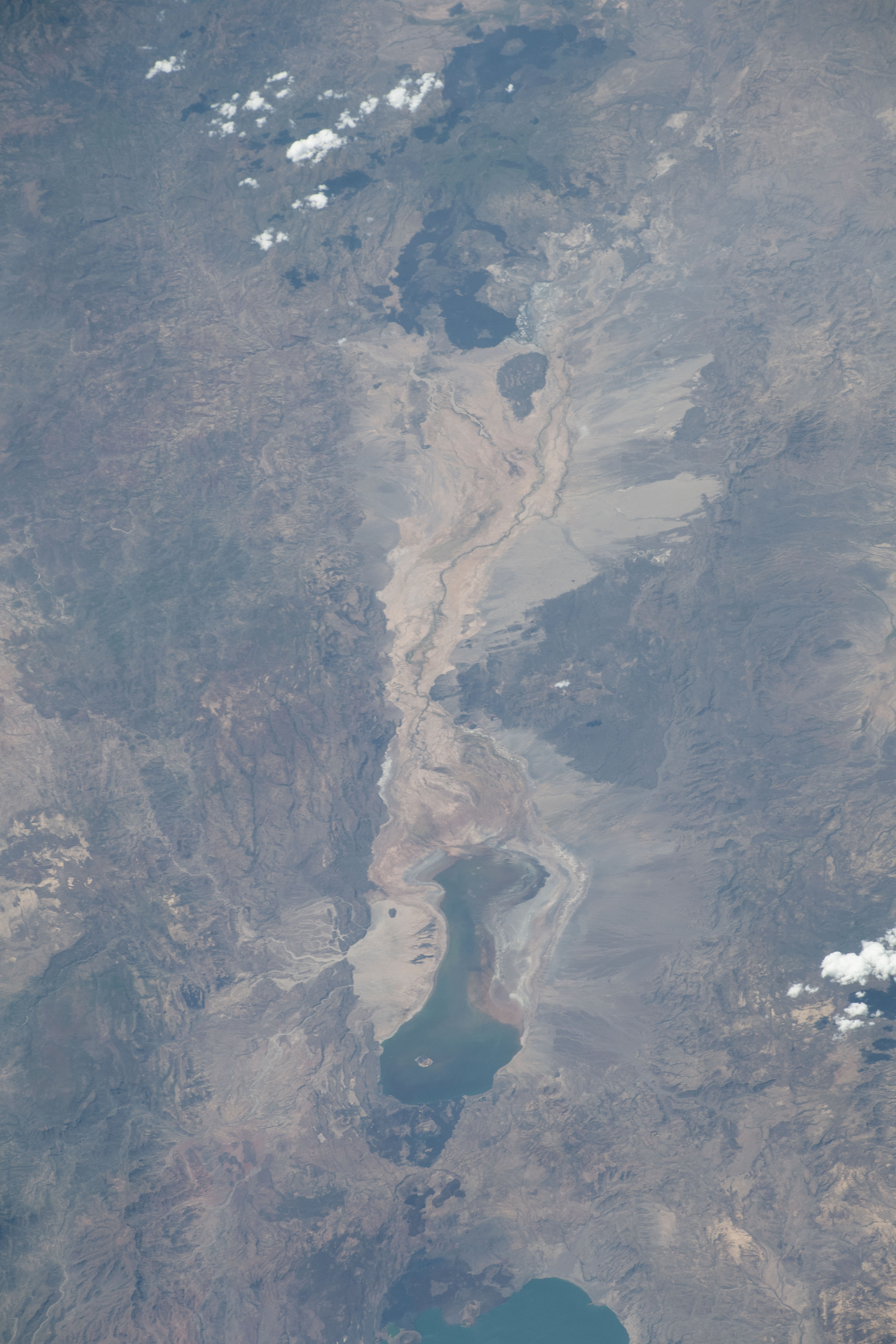
Satellite view of the area (2018)

On 21–22 July 2024, two landslides buried two villages in the South Ethiopia Regional State, Ethiopia, killing 257 people and injuring 12. The second landslide buried those who had arrived to help in the wake of the first. These are the deadliest landslides in Ethiopian history.

== Background ==
Gofa is situated in South Ethiopia Regional State, approximately 450 kilometres (280 mi) from the capital Addis Ababa, a journey that takes around 10 hours by car. According to statements from locals, the area where the landslides occurred was rural, remote, and mountainous. The soil in the region is known to be unstable, and landslides and heavy rains lead to deadly incidents every year. In 2016, heavy rains in Wolaita, also in South Ethiopia, led to landslides which killed 41 people. In May 2024, 50 people were killed in a landslide in the same area as the July event.

== Incident ==
Following heavy rains in the locality of Kencho-Shacha in Geze Gofa, the first landslide occurred the evening of 21 July, burying four households. The next morning at about 10:00 EAT (07:00 UTC), a second landslide occurred as people arrived at the scene to rescue survivors, leading to additional deaths. Between the landslides, two nearby villages were buried.

At least 257 deaths were attributed to the landslide, including 148 men and 81 women, making it Ethiopia's deadliest landslide. Among the dead was the locality's administrator. The United Nations Office for the Coordination of Humanitarian Affairs said that the final death toll could exceed 500.

== Aftermath ==
Ethiopian state-affiliated media outlet Fana Broadcasting Corporate shared images on Facebook of rescuers digging through the disaster area with shovels and their bare hands. On 23 July, Markos Melese, head of the National Disaster Response Agency in Gofa Zone, told Reuters that first responders were still recovering bodies. By that same day, at least 10 people had been rescued from the rubble.

First responders reported that families were identifying and claiming victims' bodies, while unclaimed remains were buried on-site. A volunteer told Addis Standard that recovered bodies were collected in a tent for a later burial ceremony. The initial lack of machinery among responders reportedly hindered search efforts. The United Nations Office for the Coordination of Humanitarian Affairs said that at least 15,515 people were affected by the disaster, adding that urgent evacuations were needed for these people who are at high risk of further such incidents due to continuing rains.

== Response ==
On social media, Prime Minister Abiy Ahmed expressed sorrow and stated that emergency services had been deployed. He visited the site of the landslide on 26 July. The Federal Parliamentary Assembly declared a period of mourning from 27 to 29 July.

African Union Commission chief Moussa Faki Mahamat conveyed his support on social media, stating that efforts to find the missing and assist the displaced were ongoing.

World Health Organization head Tedros Adhanom Ghebreyesus expressed his condolences to the affected families and noted that a WHO team had been dispatched to support immediate health needs.

Intergovernmental Authority on Development executive secretary Workneh Gebeyehu urged vigilance and adherence to safety protocols amid the ongoing impacts of climate change to prevent further disasters.

The United Arab Emirates announced that its international development agency had sent a plane loaded with essential aid to Ethiopia in response to the landslides.

== See also ==
- 2024 Wayanad landslides
- 2024 Wolayita landslide
- 2024 Enga landslide
- 2017 Koshe landslide
