= Dorze people =

Ethnic group in southern Ethiopia

Dorze
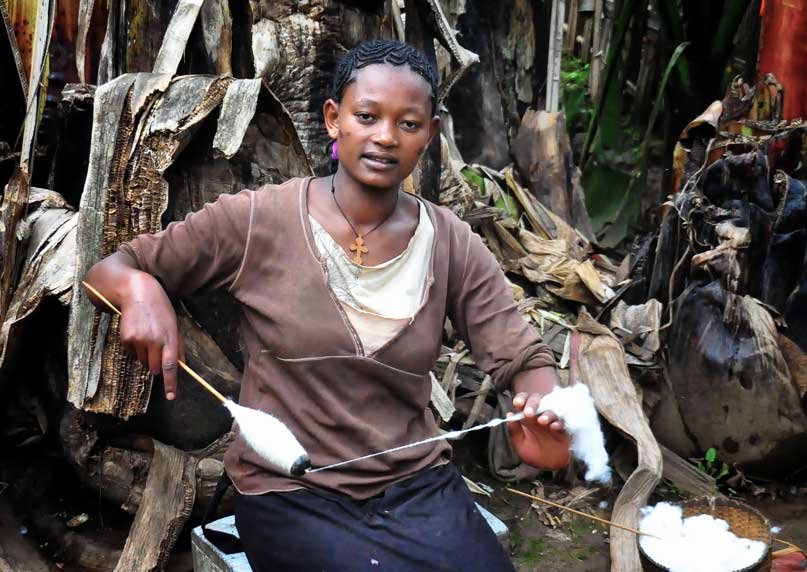

Total population
- 29,000 (1994 est.)

Regions with significant populations
- Ethiopia

Languages
- Dorze

Religion
- Christianity

Related ethnic groups
- Gamo, Dizi, Yem

The Dorze are one of the Gamo communities inhabiting the Gamo Highlands in southern Ethiopia. They speak the Dorze language, an Omotic tongue.

== Population ==
According to Ethnologue, the Dorze numbered 29,000 individuals (1994 census), of whom 9,910 were monolingual.

They primarily live in the southern parts of the country, though some have migrated to Addis Ababa and other regions. Many reside in villages near the cities of Chencha and Arba Minch.

== Language ==
They speak the Dorze language, an Omotic tongue.

== Culture ==
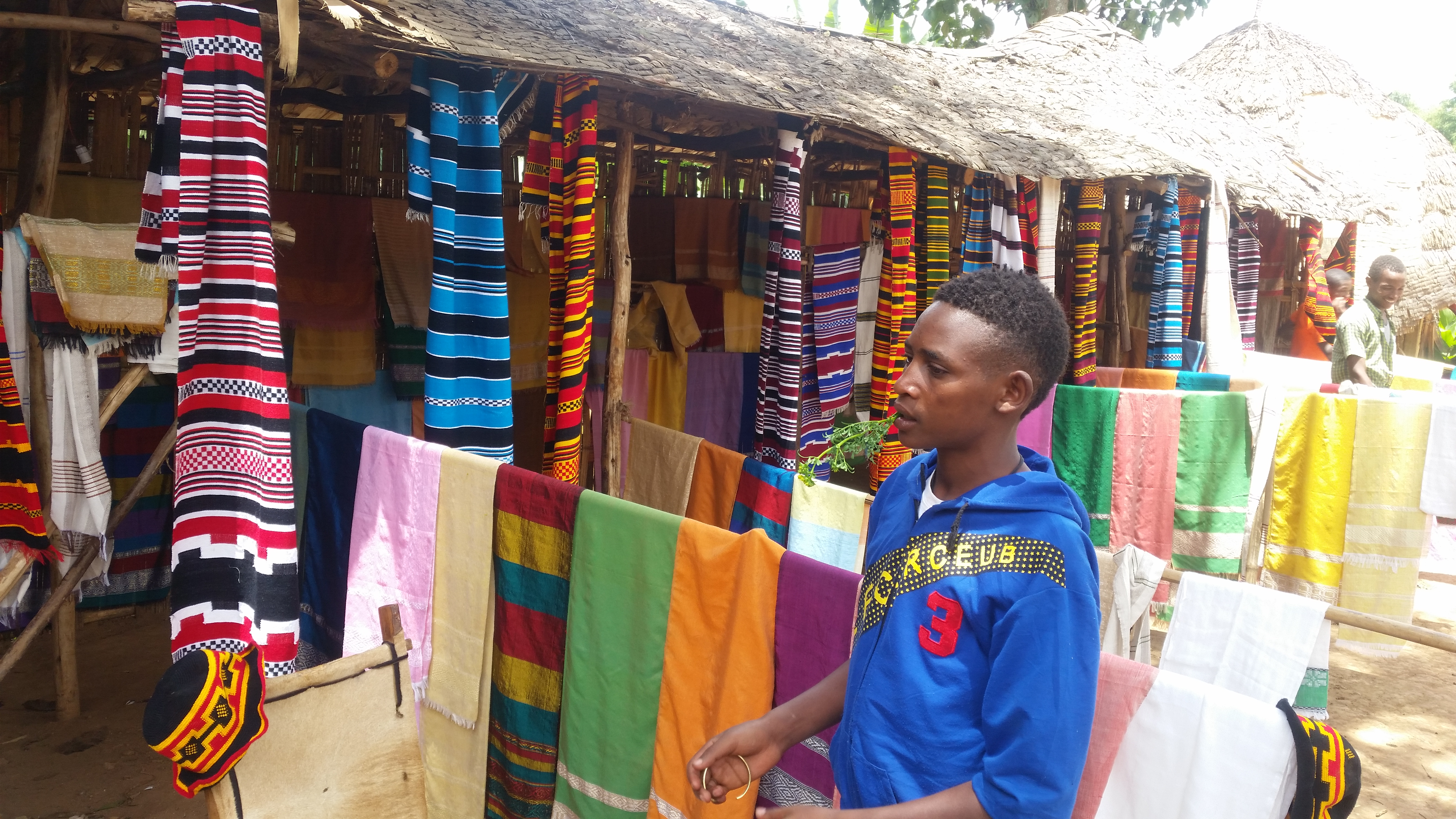
Traditional Dorze textiles

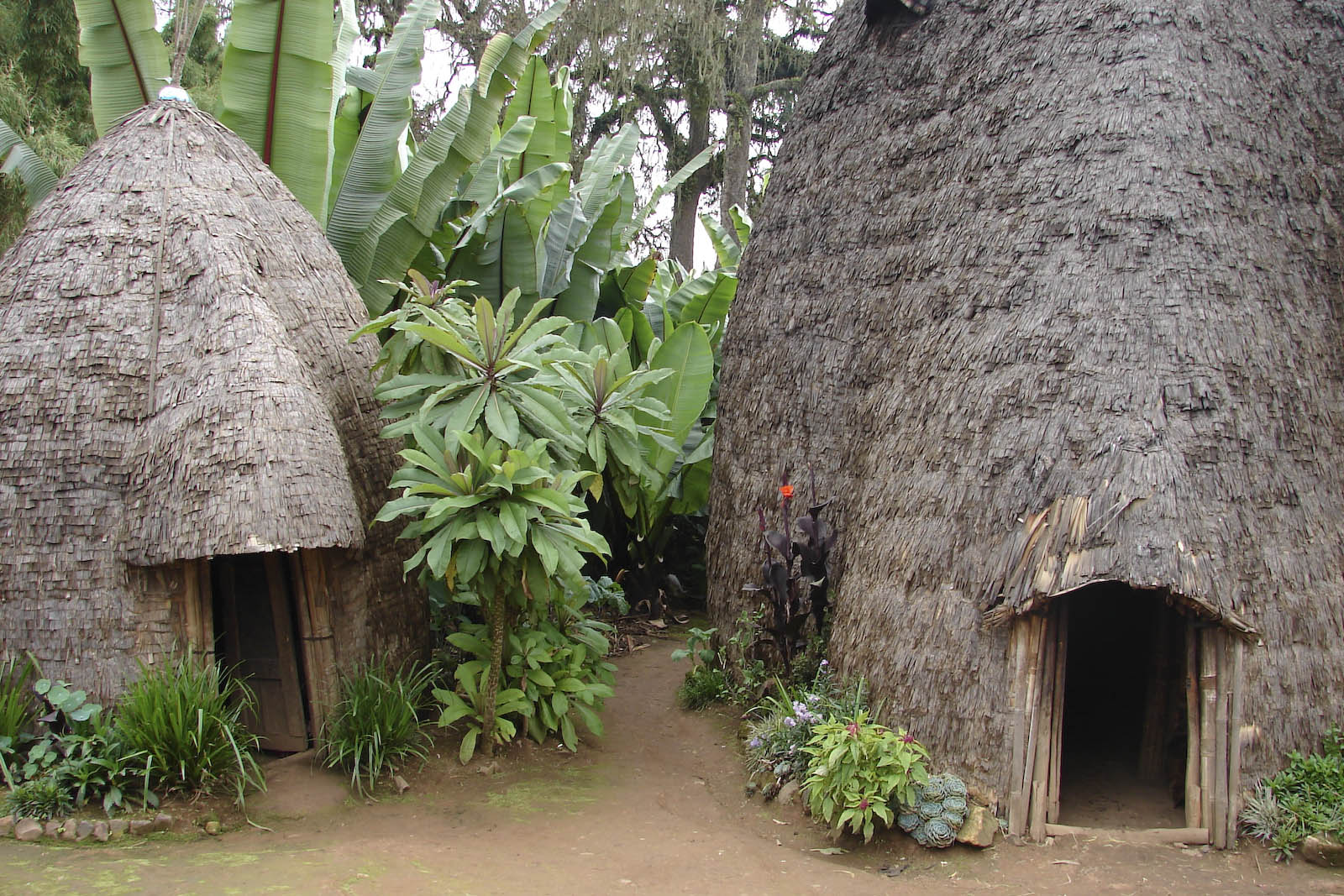
Traditional Dorze huts woven out of bamboo

Weaving is a primary profession for a number of Dorze. Traditional Dorze textiles are colourful.

They are known for their traditional weaving of huts made out of local bamboo. The huts can last up to 80 years.

Their polyphonic multi-part vocal music features a sophisticated use of hocket.

== Religion ==
Dorze people originally adhered to traditional African religions. Most are members to the faith of the Ethiopian Orthodox Tewahedo Church.

== History ==
The Dorze people are an Omotic-speaking ethnic group native to the Gamo Highlands in southern Ethiopia.

=== Early Material Culture ===
Prior to the widespread adoption of cotton, the early material culture of the Gamo Highlands relied heavily on localized natural resources, specifically bamboo and the enset plant (false banana). Dorze artisans utilized organic plant fibers for structural engineering, splitting bamboo to construct towering residential dwellings and processing enset fibers for utility items.

Beyond its use in splitting large culms to construct towering, beehive shaped residential dwellings, bamboo served as the foundation for domestic tools. Artisans crafted durable baskets, fencing, and walking sticks. While the core of the enset plant served as a dietary staple (Kocho), its resilient, fibrous byproducts were extracted during food processing to engineer utility goods. The dried leaf sheaths and outer fibers were twisted and braided into ropes, tethers for livestock, floor mats, and household seating pads.

Concurrently, animal husbandry provided a continuous supply of raw hides. Dorze artisans developed specialized skills in scarping, curing, and tanning leather. Before the introduction of northern textile technologies, leather served as the primary material for everyday apparel and specialized ceremonial shields. This foundational mastery of hide preservation established a highly structured division of artisanal labor within the community.

=== Technical Evolution and Cotton Integration ===
Historical and anthropological records attribute the introduction of cotton spinning and textile technology to northern Christians who entered the Gamo Highlands from northern Ethiopia. The primary agents of this transfer were Christian Amharas. The mechanics of the introduction are preserved in the Dorze language. The technical terminology for weaving and spinning equipment used by the Dorze today feature a direct derivation from Amhara textile vocabulary, proving a direct teacher-student transmission. During the 15th century, the Christian Ethiopian Empire under medieval monarchs like Emperor Zara Yaqob pushed southward, establishing administrative, military, and religious outposts. The Dorze were integrated into the feudal labor framework of the medieval court. The Dorze served as domestic laborers, agricultural handlers, and property maintainers. The imperial court required massive quantities of hand-spun, hand-woven white cotton garments to distinguish the nobility and priesthood from the general populace. The Dorze were put to work mastering the early treadle looms introduced by northern craftsmen.

During the early to mid-19th century, the independent Kingdom of Shewa expandeed under King Sahle Selassie. In Ankober, the capital of the Kingdom of Shewa, the Dorze were integrated into a feudal labor framework. They were designated as domestic workers tasked with maintaining the royal estate, clearing lands, and carrying supplies for the court. Recognizing their distinct facility for fiber-weaving inherited from centuries of bamboo and enset mastery, King Sahle Selassie consolidated Dorze craftsmen into specialized court workshops in Ankober and were introduced to the pre-existing Amhara shemma fabrics and tibeb border techniques. Under Amhara master weavers, they produced shemma cloth exclusively for the royal court, provincial governors, and clergy. This era institutionalized their transition into specialized, state-dependant artisans.

When Menelik II took the imperial throne and permanently moved the seat of power away from Ankober, the Dorze population in Ankober was moved alongside the moving court still functioning under Amhara master weavers. They relocated to the newly founded capital of Addis Ababa in the late 1880s. To keep these weavers close to the imperial palace, they were allocated land on the northern edge of the capital, in the foothills of Mount Entoto. This settlement became the Shiro Meda district.

==== Industrial Scaling and Transition ====
During their integration into the imperial court system, the Dorze functioned as the primary labor force for the mass production of textiles that were culturally specific to the Amhara nobility. This period marked a structural transition in Dorze material culture, where traditional leather garments were replaced by handwoven cotton fabrics. The structural evoluton of Dorze attire directly mirrors the form and funciton of traditional Amhara clothing pieces.

Rather than adopting the Habesha kemis, the Dorze women utilized the netela as a full wrap skirt. This wrapping technique directly influenced the development of contemporary Dorze ethnic dress through the adaption of northern garment structures. The Dinguza refers specifically to the heavy, distinctive patterned cotton fabric characterized by bold red, yellow, and black horizontal geometric stripes. Within the Dorze and broader Gamo material culture, the Dinguza fabric was used to construct the wide traditional pants worn by men, alongside specialized ceremonial capes and scarves. The Dorze adapted the exact structural form of the Amhara tiftif meqenet to create the Dinguza. The Dorze managed to turn the northern belt technique into a heavy-duty, internationally recognized Dinguza that serves as the visual centerpiece of their own attire.

Some communities of Dorze people live on the peripheries of Addis Ababa, mostly in the Burayu and Sebeta areas. A group of Dorze people had a conflict with some Oromo people. This issue got an immediate attention among the Qeerroo who are active in Ethiopian politics in recent years. The incident occurred as the Qeerroo were organizing themselves for the reception of the Oromo Liberation Front leaders, on the 14 and 15 September—following political reform by prime minister Abiy Ahmed. This little conflict between the Dorze and Oromo people grew to a full-blown attack on the whole population of Dorze as the Qeerroo returned from the reception. The result was a universal massacring: killing the men and children with machetes, a ruthless raping of the women in front of their husbands and children, targeting specifically Dorze (and some Gurage) people living around Addis Ababa, on the 16 and 17 September 2018. Independent media sources called the killing a case of ethnic cleansing. In the Burayu area alone, the media has reported that 23 people have been killed, more than 500 have been injured and over 15000 people have been displaced. Other sources citing data from the police have confirmed that more 60 people have been killed.
