= Chencha (woreda) =

District in South Ethiopia Regional State, Ethiopia

Coordinates: 6°15′N 37°40′E

Chencha is a woreda in South Ethiopia Regional State, Ethiopia. Part of the Gamo Zone, Chencha is bordered on the south by Arba Minch Zuria, on the west by Dita & Gofa on the north by Kucha and Boreda, and on the east by Mirab Abaya. Towns in Chencha include Chencha, Dorze, Dokko and Ezo.

According to a 2004 report, Chencha had 36 kilometers of all-weather roads and 1 kilometer of dry-weather roads, for an average road density of 101 kilometers per 1000 square kilometers.

== Demographics ==
Based on the 2007 Census conducted by the CSA, this woreda has a total population of 111,686, of whom 51,310 are men and 60,376 women; 13,304 or 11.91% of its population are urban dwellers. The majority of the inhabitants practiced Ethiopian Orthodox Christianity, with 62.19% of the population reporting that belief, and 36.82% were Protestants.

The 1994 national census reported a total population for this woreda of 88,040 of whom 38,750 were men and 49,290 were women; 7,851 or 8.92% of its population were urban dwellers. The largest ethnic group reported in Chencha was the Gamo people (98.7%); all other ethnic groups made up 1.3% of the population. Gamo was spoken as a first language by 95.89%, 1.88% Amharic, and 1.85% spoke Dorze; the remaining 1.4% spoke all other primary languages reported. While performing fieldwork in 1991, Alemayehu Abebe reports that he found 14 kebeles in Chencha inhabited by the Dorze people.
