= Aruro Island =

Island in Lake Abaya in Ethiopia

Coordinates: 6°24′N 37°56′E

Aruro is the biggest island in Lake Abaya in Ethiopia. Aruro is administratively part of Boreda Abaya, a woreda of the Gamo Gofa Zone.
