= Burayu massacre =

2018 series civil unrest in Burayu, Oromia Region, Ethiopia

- Part of the OLA insurgency
- Location of Burayu in Ethiopia
- Location: 09°05′08.93″N 38°31′19.17″E; Addis Ababa, Burayu, Oromia Region, Ethiopia
- Date: 14–16 September 2018
- Target: Majority non-Oromo residents of Burayu
- Attack type: Pogrom, looting, arson, mass murder
- Deaths
- Victims: Majority ethnic Dorze group and other non-Oromo minorities: Gamos, Wolayitas, Gurages, Silt'e, Amharas and others.
- Perpetrators: Pro-OLF and "mobs" of Oromo youth, Oromo Liberation Army
- Motive: Ethnic attack against non-Oromo minorities

The Burayu massacre (Oromo: Ajjeechaa Burraayyuu, Amharic: የቡራዩ ጭፍጨፋ) was a series of communal clashes which occurred in the vicinity of the Ethiopian town of Burayu, in the Oromia Region, on 14–16 September 2018. Individuals from the Oromo and Dorze ethnicities fought in and around Burayu, a town in Oromia Region which is located near the northwest boundary of Addis Ababa, the federal capital. Different sources cite number of civilians killed both from Oromo and non-Oromo ethnicity.

== Background ==
Since 2016, Ethiopia had been gripped by repeated waves of unrest and protest against the ruling Ethiopian Peoples' Revolutionary Democratic Front, despite the EPRDF's victory in 2015 general elections (in which it and its allies won all seats in the lower house of parliament), which were not considered credible by international observers. These protests displayed a considerable degree of inter-ethnic solidarity.

Prime Minister Hailemariam Dessalegn resigned in April 2018 and was replaced by Abiy Ahmed from Oromo ethnicity, a relative unknown who had previously been Deputy President of the Oromia Region. Abiy swiftly promised to implement a sweeping series of political and economic reforms, and ended the state of emergency that had been in place since October 2016. As part of this political opening, political prisoners were pardoned and opposition movements permitted to resume operating in the country, including the Oromo Liberation Front, an Ethiopian political party established in 1973 by Oromo nationalists to promote self-determination for the Oromo people against Abyssinian colonial rule by Amhara ethnic groups. OLF believe that the Oromo people constitute a nation that united by common descent, history, culture, or language, inhabiting today's Oromia Region and Oromia Zone in Amhara Region territory.

=== OLF rally ===
The chairman of OLF Party Dawud Ibsa, along with 1,500 fighters, made their formal return to Ethiopia in September 2018, and were received by millions of demonstrators at a large rally at Meskel Square in central Addis Ababa on 15 September. Their presence was met with clashes from city residents, who in particular objected to the OLF's supporters taking down the Outlawed Flag of the Ethiopian Empire without seal (1914–1936) and replacing it with the separatist movement's, painting public spaces in the "OLF's colors". The "scuffles" in advance of the rally were reported to have left at least one person dead in Addis Ababa.

=== Burayu ===
The town of Burayu is located in the Special Zone Surrounding Finfinne in the Oromia Region, directly adjacent to the national capital, Addis Ababa. With the growth of the city in recent decades and urban sprawl, the town has faced considerable economic and demographic pressure.

== Main events ==
According to eyewitnesses, clashes began late on Thursday, 13 September and continued sporadically the next day before escalating into a "full scale attack" on Saturday, 15 September. The events over the weekend were characterized as "organized robbery", as rioters looted and burnt businesses belonging to ethnic minorities. Hassan Ibrahim, a trader, told Reuters that "mobs of ethnic Oromo youth then marched here in Ashwa Meda [a neighborhood in Burayu] and attacked our homes and looted businesses chanting 'leave our land'".

Regional police were largely unresponsive to the events as they folded; regional police commissioner Alemayehu Ejigu described the mobs as "organized hoodlums whose interest is looting", but said that the police were unable to respond "due to the topography of the region where the attack took place". Some witnesses alleged that local police had joined the mob in attacking local businesses. In the Burayu area alone, authorities reported that 23 people were killed, more than 500 have been injured and over 15,000 were displaced (local news sources reported exactly 15,086 people). Addis Ababa police said the following Monday that 14 people had been killed in Kolfe district (Amharic: ክፍለ ከተማ, kifle ketema), 5 in Addis Ketema, 1 in Arada, 3 in Lafto and 5 in Kirkos.

== Aftermath ==
On 17 September, thousands of people marched in Addis Ababa condemning the killings and perceived police inaction, five people were shot dead in what Amnesty International described as a "violent dispersal". In Arba Minch, condemnatory protests nearly turned violent as angry youths sought to stage reprisals against Oromo-owned businesses there, before elders intervened and succeeded in calming the mob.

The attacks were denounced across the political system. Prime Minister Abiy Ahmed. Leaders of seven opposition parties including the Oromo Federalist Congress, Oromo Democratic Front, Oromo Unity for Freedom, Oromo Unity Front, Blue Party and Patriotic Ginbot 7 Movement for Unity and Democracy issued a statement condemning the massacre after a two-day meeting.

At least 1,200 people were detained by Addis Ababa, Oromo Region, and federal police following the attacks, although The New York Times reported that most of those had been arrested in connection with unrelated "petty offenses" in sweeps of bars and clubs and other gathering spots across Addis Ababa. Amnesty International said that many of those arrested had in fact been taking part the in protests against the ethnic violence and demanded their immediate release. Negeri Lencho, a spokesperson for the Oromo Regional government, said that police who had participated in the attacks had been arrested.

Individuals sympathetic to Oromo ethno-nationalists engaged in revisionism or denialism regarding the attacks, claiming that Oromos had in fact been the targets or that they were in some way a premeditated false flag operation; Birhanemeskel Abebe Segni, Ethiopian Consul-General in Los Angeles, disseminated a document he claimed showed Ginbot 7 applying for a permit for a demonstration protesting the attacks the day before they had taken place, a charge a Ginbot 7 spokesperson denounced as a "recklessly cynical conspiracy theory". Activist Jawar Mohammed claimed that 43 Oromos had been killed in the area of Saris Abo, but presented no evidence.

Entertainer and activist Tamagn Beyene organized a relief appeal for the Global Alliance for the Rights of Ethiopians (GARE) that raised 13 million birr (US$425,000) for the benefit of those who fled their homes. Musician Teddy Afro donated 1 million birr (US$36,000) to relief efforts.
