= Provinces of Ethiopia =

Pre-1992 first-level administrative divisions

Historically, Ethiopia was divided into provinces, further subdivided into awrajjas or districts, until they were replaced by ethnolinguistic-based regions (kililoch) and chartered cities in 1995.

== History ==
Map of the provinces of Ethiopia in 1935. (Derived from Perham, Margery; 1969): The Government of Ethiopia)

=== Pre-1936 ===
Older provinces (existing prior to the 1936–41 fascist Italian occupation), are still frequently used to indicate locations within Ethiopia. These include:

- Agame
- Agawmeder
- Begemder
- Amhara province
- Dembiya
- Enderta
- Fatagar
- Hadiya
- Ifat
- Lasta
- Menz
- Qwara
- Semien
- Tembien
- Tigray
- Tselemt
- Tsegede
- Wag
- Wegera

=== 1942–1974 ===
Map of the provinces of the Ethiopian Empire

Ethiopia was divided into 12 provinces or governates-general (taklai ghizat) by Imperial Ethiopian Government Decree No. 1 of 1942 and later amendments. The 12 provinces were:

- Begemder
- Gojjam
- Wollo
- Shewa (Shoa)
- Gamu-Gofa
- Illubabor
- Kaffa
- Sidamo
- Tigray
- Welega
- Hararghe
- Arsi

Bale was created as a 13th province when it was split off from Harrarghe in 1960. Eritrea was united with Ethiopia and made a 14th province in 1962.

=== 1974–1991 ===
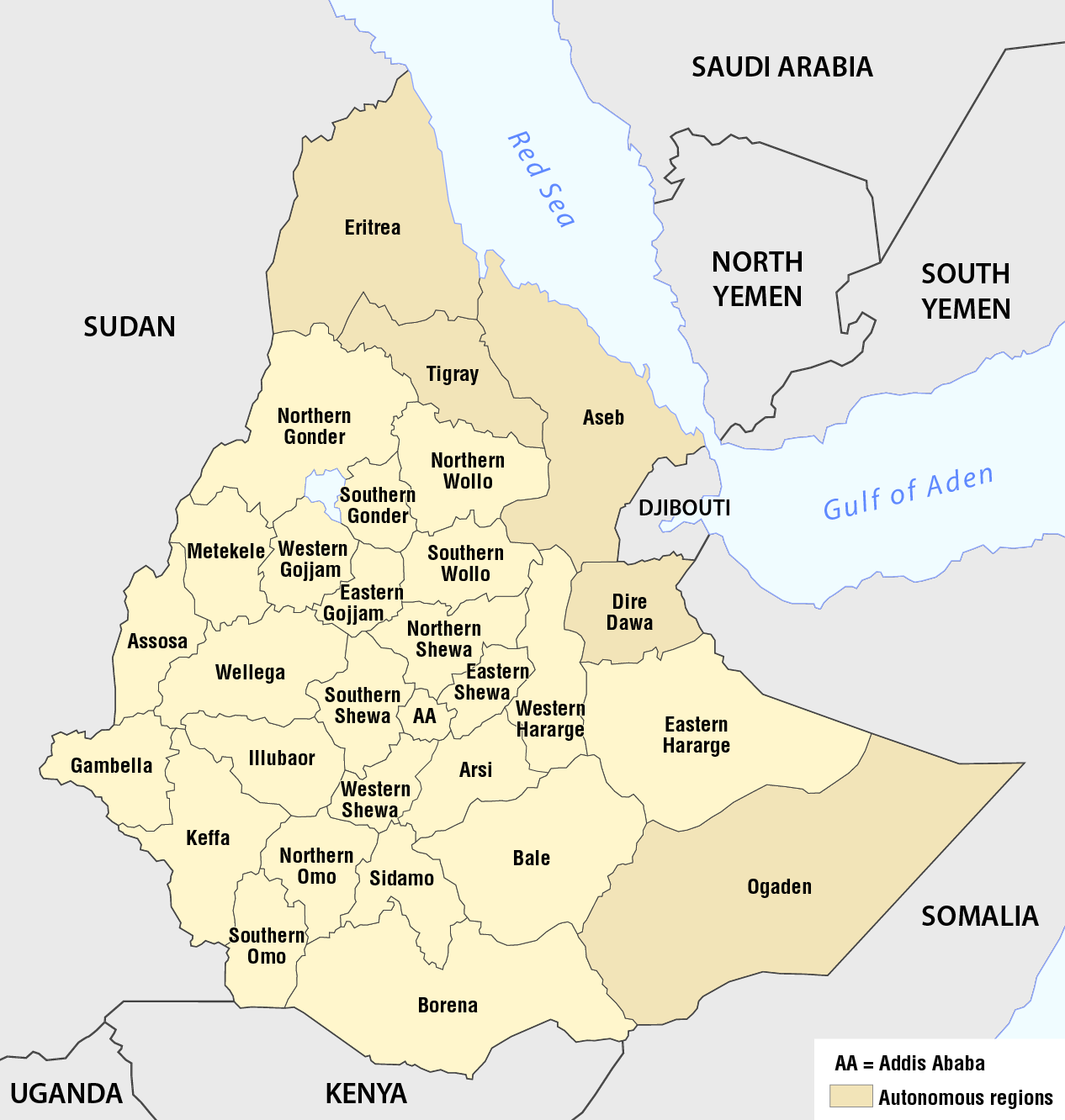
PDRE administrative divisions

When the Derg took power in 1974 they relabelled the provinces as regions (kifle hager). By 1981 Addis Ababa had become a separate administrative division from Shewa, and Aseb was split off from Eritrea in 1981, making 16 administrative divisions in total. With the exception of Arsi (whose name derives from the eponymous Oromo subgroup, and which initially included majority-Gurage area later transferred to Shewa province (becoming Southern Shewa), all of the provinces were deliberately drawn to include multiple "tribes" (or ethnicities) so as to better facilitate national cohesion.

Under the 1987 Constitution of Ethiopia, the military rule of the Derg evolved into the civilian government of the People's Democratic Republic of Ethiopia, and chapter 8 of the Constitution determined that the state would be subdivided into "autonomous regions" and "administrative regions". Chapter 9 gave to the National Shengo (the legislature) the power to establish the regions. The Shengo established the regions in Proclamation No. 14 of 1987, on 18 September. There were thirty regions, consisting of five autonomous regions, and twenty-five administrative regions. The five autonomous regions were:

- Aseb
- Dire Dawa
- Eritrea
- Ogaden
- Tigray

The twenty-five administrative regions were:

- Addis Ababa
- Arsi
- Asosa
- Bale
- Borana
- East Gojam
- East Harerge
- East Shewa
- Gambela
- Ilubabor
- Kefa
- Metekel
- North Gonder
- North Omo
- North Shewa
- North Welo
- Sidamo
- South Gonder
- South Omo
- South Shewa
- South Wollo
- Welega
- West Gojam
- West Hararghe
- West Shewa

== See also ==
- History of Ethiopia
