= Kola Shara conflict =

Location	Kola Shara, Arba Munch Zuria, South Ethiopia Regional State, Ethiopia
Result	Arba Minch government victory

Belligerents
Kola Shara residents' militia	Arba Minch government South Ethiopia Regional State police

Casualties and losses
2+ killed	4 killed
- 18 total killed, 20 total injured 1+ civilian killed

On August 24, 2023, a clash broke out between a militia composed of local landowners in Shara Kebele and South Ethiopia Regional State police in Kola Shara, near Arba Minch, South Ethiopia Regional State, Ethiopia. Eighteen people were killed in the skirmish, and 20 more were injured. The skirmish was a rare example of armed insurgency in South Ethiopia Regional State.

== Background ==
Kola Shara is a kebele on the outskirts of Arba Minch, with about 20,000 residents. Since 2002, the regional administration of Arba Minch Zuria district had tried to incorporate Kola Shara into the district, which would dispossess landowners in Kola Shara. While three other kebeles were successfully incorporated into Arba Minch, Kola Shara stood it's ground and that led to a dispute. Discussions with local elders in both areas, landowners, and Arba Minch officials did not lead anywhere substantive.

In late 2023, Arba Minch officials continued along with the plan to integrate Kola Shara without an agreement, leading residents and major landowners of Kola Shara to form a militia. The Arba Minch government continued to supply money towards Kola Shara's needs, including paying for education, but the Kola Shara administration rejected this and education had ceased since May 2023.

== Conflict ==
On August 24, 2023, law enforcement from Arba Minch city and regional police from the South Ethiopia Regional State government entered Kola Shara to disband the local administration and subsume the kebele. Residents began setting mattresses on fire outside a military camp where the police were staying, and in response, police shot at civilians. Inside the local administration office, government forces shot at two militiamen and one resident holed up inside the building. Elsewhere, four police officers were killed in a shootout between militiamen and police.

At least eighteen people were killed in the conflict. Another twenty people were injured. Voice of America's Amharic network initially claimed 12 people had been killed and 15 injured.

== Aftermath ==
Following the skirmish, Kola Shara was forcibly annexed into Arba Minch. There was no more conflict, although youth in the area said that they were scared that Ethiopian police were seeking them out, and when arrested they would be tortured.

The Ethiopian Human Rights Commission released a report on the conflict in January 2024.
