= 2024 Wolayita landslide =

2024 landslide in south Ethiopia

- Date: August 5, 2024
- Location: Wolayita Zone, Ethiopia
- Type: Landslide in mountainous terrain
- Cause: Heavy rainfall
- Deaths: 13+
- Displaced: 300+ evacuated

On 5 August 2024, a massive landslide caused by heavy rainfall struck the Wolayita Zone of Ethiopia, killing at least 13 people and requiring the evacuation of over 300 people from the region due to fears of follow-up landslides.

== Background ==
From 21–22 July 2024, heavy rainfall throughout Ethiopia caused two landslides that buried two villages in the locality of Kencho-Shacha in Geze Gofa, causing 257 deaths and several hundred more to reported missing. Estimates by the United Nations Office for the Coordination of Humanitarian Affairs predicted that the final death toll could exceed 500.

== Landslide ==
In the Southern Ethiopian Wolayita Zone, heavy rainfall triggered a landslide, killing at least 13 people which included children. Wolayita chief administrator Samuel Fola reported that over 300 people in the Kindo Didaye district were evacuated out of fears of additional landslides occurring in the region due to its rural, mountainous terrain and lack of infrastructure.
