= Oyda (woreda) =

Oyda is one of the woredas in the Southern Nations, Nationalities, and Peoples' Region of Ethiopia. It is named after Oyda people living in this woreda. Part of the Gamo Gofa Zone, Oyda is bordered on the south by Uba Debretsehay, on the west by the Debub Omo Zone, on the north by Geze Gofa, and on the northeast by Demba Gofa. Oyda was part of former Gofa Zuria woreda.

== Demographics ==
Based on the 2007 Census conducted by the CSA, this woreda has a total population of 33,310, of whom 16,674 are men and 16,636 women; none of its population are urban dwellers. The majority of the inhabitants were Protestants, with 74.75% of the population reporting that belief, 13.17% practiced traditional beliefs, and 10.74% practiced Ethiopian Orthodox Christianity.
