= Bulki =

Bulki Bulchi, Bulk'I
- Town
- Location within Ethiopia
- Coordinates: 6°17′00″N 36°48′40″E
- Country: Ethiopia
- Region: South Ethiopia Regional State
- Zone: Gofa Zone
- District: Geze Gofa
- Elevation: 2,385 m (7,825 ft)

Population (2005)
  - Total: 5,878
- Time zone: UTC+3 (EAT)

Bulki is a town in southern Ethiopia. It sits on a narrow ridge, high above the town of Sawla, in the Gofa Zone of the South Ethiopia Regional State. It is the administrative center of Geze Gofa woreda.

== Population ==
Based on figures from the Central Statistical Agency in 2005, Bulki has an estimated total population of 5,878 of whom 2,820 were males and 3,058 were females. The 1994 national census reported this town had a total population of 3,096 of whom 1,491 were males and 1,605 were females.

== History ==
Bulki was the capital of Gamu-Gofa from around 1928, replacing Berza. During the Italian occupation, the town reportedly was the home of the local official Italian representative, and equipped with a post office, a clinic and a Roman Catholic mission. The Ethiopian government continued postal service after the Italians were defeated.
