= Deramalo =

Administrative area in Ethiopia

Deramalo is one of the woredas in the Southern Nations, Nationalities, and Peoples' Region of Ethiopia. Part of the Gamo Gofa Zone, Deramalo is bordered on the southeast by Bonke, on the southwest by Kemba, on the west by Zala, on the north by Kucha, and on the east by Dita. Towns in Deramalo include Wacha. Deramalo was part of former Dita Dermalo woreda.

== Demographics ==
Based on the 2007 Census conducted by the CSA, this woreda has a total population of 81,025, of whom 41,618 are men and 39,407 women; 3,220 or 3.97% of its population are urban dwellers. The majority of the inhabitants were Protestants, with 46.02% of the population reporting that belief, 33.01% practiced Ethiopian Orthodox Christianity, and 17.07% practiced traditional beliefs.
