= Dita (woreda) =

Dita is one of the woredas in the Southern Nations, Nationalities, and Peoples' Region of Ethiopia. Part of the Gamo Gofa Zone, Dita is bordered on the south by Arba Minch Zuria and Bonke, on the west by Deramalo, on the north by Kucha, and on the east by Chencha. Towns in Dita include Zeda. Dita was part of former Dita Dermalo woreda.

== Demographics ==
Based on the 2007 Census conducted by the CSA, this woreda has a total population of 83,987, of whom 39,465 are men and 44,522 women; 2,972 or 3.54% of its population are urban dwellers. The majority of the inhabitants practiced Ethiopian Orthodox Christianity, with 69.11% of the population reporting that belief, 27.76% were Protestants, and 2.43% practiced traditional beliefs.
