= Gamu-Gofa =

Former province in southern Ethiopia

Coordinates: 5°45′N 37°00′E

Location of Gamu Gofa within the Ethiopian Empire

Gamu-Gofa was a province in the southern part of Ethiopia, named after two of the ethnic groups living within its boundaries, the Gamo and the Gofa. First incorporated into Ethiopia by Emperor Menelik II in the 1880s, its capital was first at Chencha, then around 1965 the capital was moved to Arba Minch. This province was bordered on the west and north by Kaffa, on the north and east by Sidamo, on the southeast by Lake Chew Bahir, and on the south by Kenya and Lake Turkana.

Gamu-Gofa Province came into existence as a result of Proclamation 1943/1, which created 12 taklai ghizats from the existing 42 provinces of varying sizes. With the adoption of the new constitution in 1995, Gamu-Gofa was reorganized into the Semien Omo and Debub Omo Zones of the Southern Nations, Nationalities, and Peoples' Region of Ethiopia.
