= Demba Gofa =

Woreda in Ethiopia

Demba Gofa is one of the woredas in the Southern Nations, Nationalities, and Peoples' Region of Ethiopia. Part of the Gamo Gofa Zone, Demba Gofa is bordered on the south by Uba Debretsehay and Oyda, on the west by Geze Gofa, on the northwest by Melokoza, on the north by the Dawro Zone, on the east by Kucha, and on the southeast by Zala. Sawla is surrounded by Demba Gofa. Demba Gofa was part of former Gofa Zuria woreda.

== Demographics ==
Based on the 2007 Census conducted by the CSA, this woreda has a total population of 81,165, of whom 40,342 are men and 40,823 women; none of its population are urban dwellers. The majority of the inhabitants were Protestants, with 65.02% of the population reporting that belief, 27.19% practiced Ethiopian Orthodox Christianity, 4.27% practiced traditional beliefs, and 1.38% were Muslim.
