= Uba Debretsehay =

Uba Debretsehay is one of the woredas in the Southern Nations, Nationalities, and Peoples' Region of Ethiopia. Part of the Gamo Gofa Zone, Uba Debretsehay is bordered on the south and west by the Debub Omo Zone, on the north by Oyda and Demba Gofa, on the northeast by Zala, and on the east by Kemba. Towns in Uba Debretsehay include Beto. Uba Debretsehay was part of former Zala Ubamale woreda.

The highest point in this woreda was Mount Argun (3418 meters), which lies near the border with the Debub Omo Zone.And the Uba Gezo people have their own culture and history, their language is Gezoi, they have their own father king who ruled until the seventeenth century and still continues, they have a traditional dress and a traditional dress called Potala, which is made of black and blue. And they are a comfortable ethnic group with over two hundred thousand people.

== Demographics ==
Based on the 2007 Census conducted by the CSA, this woreda has a total population of 69,120, of whom 34,932 are men and 34,188 women; 4,444 or 6.43% of its population are urban dwellers. The majority of the inhabitants were Protestants, with 44.43% of the population reporting that belief, 32.53% practiced traditional beliefs, 10.41% practiced Ethiopian Orthodox Christianity and 1.82% were Muslim.
