= Melokoza =

Coordinates: 6°30′N 36°40′E

Melokoza is one of the woredas in the Southern Nations, Nationalities, and Peoples' Region of Ethiopia. Part of the Gamo Gofa Zone, Melokoza is bordered on the south by Basketo special woreda, on the southwest by the Debub (South) Omo Zone, on the northwest by the Konta special woreda, on the north by the Dawro Zone, and on the east by Demba Gofa and Geze Gofa; the Omo River defines its northwestern boundary separating the woreda from Konta and the Dawro Zone. The major town in Melokoza is Leha.

== Overview ==
Food crops in Melokoza include enset, sweet potatoes and yams, maize and horse beans, while coffee and the cardamom-like spice aframomum are significant cash crops. According to a 2004 report, this woreda had no reported roads or tracks.

A September 2007 landslide in Melokoza was reported to have killed three people, displaced 42 households, and damaged 15 hectares of crops.

== Demographics ==
Based on the 2007 Census conducted by the CSA, this woreda has a total population of 120,398, of whom 59,877 are men and 60,521 women; 3,277 or 2.72% of its population are urban dwellers. The majority of the inhabitants were Protestants, with 56.22% of the population reporting that belief, 32.87% practiced Ethiopian Orthodox Christianity, and 6% practiced traditional beliefs.

The 1994 national census reported a total population for this woreda of 74,992 of whom 37,349 were males and 37,573 were females; 1,351 or 1.8% of its population were urban dwellers. The five largest ethnic groups reported in Melokoza were the Goffa (49.75%), the Melo (24.74%), the Basketo (21.9%), the Amhara (1.99%), and the Dime (0.75%); all other ethnic groups made up 0.87% of the population. Goffa is spoken as a first language by 40.49%, 30.94% Basketo, 26.33% Melo, and 0.85% speak Amharic; the remaining 1.39% spoke all other primary languages reported. However, Ralph Siebert's local research in 1995 led him to believe that this woreda was predominantly inhabited by the Goffa people, although in the same report he notes that "Laha is one of the main places in the Melo area, and the variety [of language] spoken there is similar to Gofa". Concerning religious beliefs, the 1994 census reported that 37.47% of the population said they practiced Ethiopian Orthodox Christianity, 29.04% were Protestants, and 28.03% observed traditional religions.
