= Kaffa Province =

Former province in southwestern Ethiopia

Coordinates: 7°N 37°E

Location of Kaffa within the Ethiopian Empire

Kaffa (Amharic: ካፋ) was a province on the southwestern side of Ethiopia; its capital city was Bonga. Kaffa was bordered on the west by Sudan, on the northwest by Illubabor, on the north by Walega, on the northeast by Shewa, on the east by Sidamo, and on the southeast by Gamu-Gofa.

According to legend, ancestors of today's Kafficho people in southwest Ethiopia were the first to cultivate the coffee plant and recognise the energising effect of the coffee beverage.

== See also ==
- Kingdom of Kaffa
- History of Ethiopia
