= Zala (given name) =

Zala is a feminine given name. Notable people with the given name Zala include:

- Zala, a character from the PlayStation 3 launch title Untold Legends: Dark Kingdom
- Zala, a character from Millennium series trilogy book series
- Zala Kuštrin (born 1998), Slovenian footballer
- Zala Meršnik (born 2001), Slovenian footballer
- Zala Lusibu N'Kanza (1940-1999), Congolese politician and sociologist
- Zala Vindišar (born 2000), Slovenian footballer
- Zala Zazai, Afghan police officer

== See also ==
- Zala (surname)
- Zala
