= Eurasian backflow =

Pre-Neolithic and Neolithic human migration events

"Eurasian backflow" or "Eurasian back-migrations" refers to several waves of early modern-human migrations before and during the Neolithic, when some groups of anatomically modern humans (contemporaneous Homo sapiens) returned to Africa from parts of Eurasia. Modern humans had begun dispersing into Eurasia from North Africa during the Middle Paleolithic. Today, all humans outside of Africa descend primarily from a single expansion that occurred 70,000–50,000 years ago.

Modern humans who dispersed into Eurasia came into contact with some groups of archaic humans, such as Neanderthals and Denisovans, and eventually interbred with them. As a result of this phenomenon, which continued until the Upper Paleolithic, those who returned from Eurasia played a significant role in introducing Neanderthal DNA to the African modern human genome, particularly among North Africans. Thus, in addition to intrinsic diversity within the continent borne by population structure and isolation, these historical influxes of Eurasian populations into Africa are regarded as a critical contributor to the existing genetic diversity.

== Migration history ==
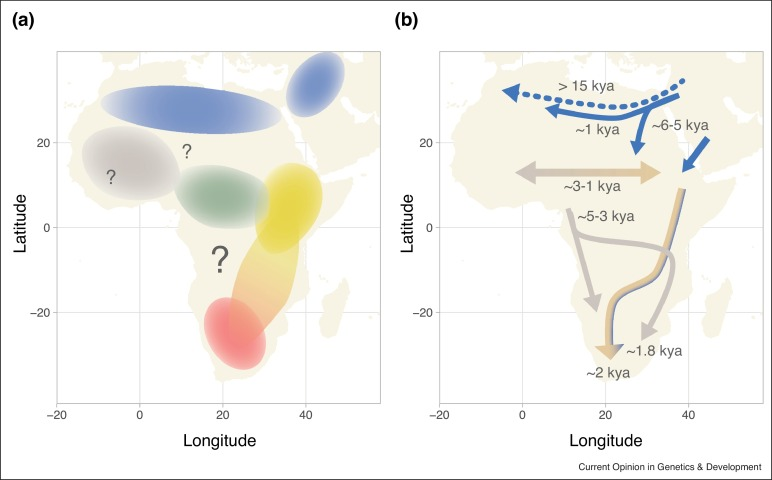
Pre-Neolithic and Neolithic migration events in Africa.

Beginning around 30,000-15,000 years ago, a population closely related to Paleolithic individuals from Dzudzuana Cave in Georgia expanded from Western Asia into Northern Africa, spreading in connection with microlithic-backed bladelet technologies that would later become ubiquitous across North Africa. This diffusion contributed up to 55% of the genetic ancestry of the Iberomaurusian culture, and introduced the mitochondrial haplogroups M1 and U6 to the region, which along with the aforementioned genetic ancestry, define the "autochthonous/typical North African" or "Maghrebi" component, as it is referred to in genetic studies.

Approximately 8,000 years ago, populations of the Neolithic Levant, Anatolia and Mesopotamia expanded into North Africa via the Sinai Peninsula. This diffusion was rooted in wider displacements of people in the wake of the 6200 BC climatic event, and coincided with the introduction of Southwest Asian domesticates such as sheep, goats, cattle, pigs and camels into North Africa and Horn of Africa, leading to the rise of Saharan cattle pastoralism and the appearance of Ashakar Ware pottery in the Maghreb. This expanding population interacted and admixed with distinct local North African ancestries, as seen in both Skhirat-Rouazi individuals of Morocco and eastern African pastoralist groups of the Pastoral Neolithic. This diffusion may have also provided the demographic and cultural conditions for the early introduction of Proto Afro-Asiatic from a West Asian homeland and then dispersal of Afro-Asiatic languages across North Africa, whose known branches of Cushitic, Chadic, Egyptian, and Berber correspond strikingly with the geography of these Neolithic expansions.

Outside of North Africa, about 3,000 years ago, or already earlier between 6,000-5,000 years ago, a further wave of farmers from Anatolia and the Near East migrated into other regions, some via the southern Arabian Peninsula into the Horn of Africa (Ethiopia, Eritrea, Somalia and Djibouti). Signs of this migration can be found in the genomes of contemporary peoples from all over East Africa as well as the introduction of Semitic languages into the region. Moreover, analysis has also recognized that some of the Eurasian ancestry in Northeast Africa could possibly pre-date agriculture, from around ~12-23 ka. Significant Eurasian ancestry is found among populations of Eastern Africa, and among specific ethnic groups of the Horn of Africa, Northern Sudan, the Sahel region, as well as among the Malagasy people of Madagascar who hitherto were predominantly of Southeast Asian heritage. A further input occurred during the Iron Age with the Phoenician expansion into North Africa and the founding of major settlements such as Carthage, and Assyrian and Persian conquests of Egypt and eastern Libya. West Eurasian ancestry thus arrived in Africa first during the Palaeolithic, then followed by several later Neolithic, Chalcolithic, Bronze Age (including the Hyksos into Egypt) and Iron Age migration events. Although Medieval events, such as the Arab expansions, also brought gene flow into various North, East and West African populations, these left a lower mark on North African genetic structure, relative to Neolithization.

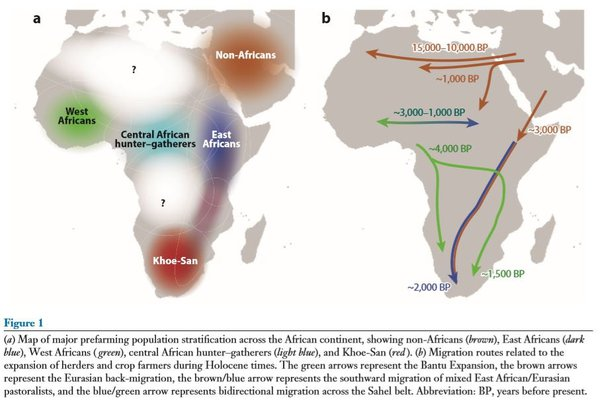
Map of major prefarming population stratification across the African continent.

The Neolithic populations migrating back-to-Africa were said to be similar to the Neolithic farmers who had brought agriculture from Anatolia to Europe about 7,000 years ago, and whose demographic legacy is most closely preserved in present-day Sardinians, their contemporary descendants. Although, other studies have revealed some genetic distinctions between the populations that brought farming into Europe and the Maghreb, and the Levantine related groups that spread southward into East Africa. A study from 2020 inferred two sources for the spread of Eurasian admixture in Northeastern Africa, with one being associated with pastoralism, involving groups originating from the Levant and North Africa. Further research has shown that the back-migration into the region was a complex process, identifying multiple origins for the Eurasian component in Northeast African groups today.

A report in November 2015 on a 4,500-year-old Ethiopian genome had originally overestimated the genetic influence of the Eurasian backflow, claiming that signs of the migration could be found in genomes all over Africa. This mistaken claim was based on a data-processing error and was corrected in February 2016. The West Asian admixture was only predominant in the populations of the Horn of Africa, in particular Ethiopian highlanders, and less relevant or absent in the genetic makeup of West and Central Africans.

== Neanderthal admixture and Eurasian ancestry ==
An investigation in 2012 discovered that unlike most sub-Saharan Africans, North Africans have similar levels of Neanderthal DNA to South Europeans and West Asians, which is pre-Neolithic in origin, rather than via any recent admixture, as the Neanderthal's genetic signals were higher in populations with an autochthonous 'back-to-Africa' genomic component that arrived 12,000 years ago. These Neanderthal genomic traces do not mark a division between Africans and non-Africans, but rather a division between sub-Saharan Africans and the rest of the modern human groups, including those from North Africa.

In 2016, researchers recognized that the Neanderthal ancestry in African populations, strongly corresponds with the levels of Western Eurasian ancestry. The geneticists elaborated that: "Neanderthal ancestry is not expected in Africa, yet today many Africans carry Neanderthal-derived alleles. The plot shows that the Neanderthal ancestry proportion in Africans is correlated with gene flow from Eurasians. For example, knowing that today Eurasians carry ~2% of Neanderthal ancestry, we observed that East Africans (Ethiopians) had ~1% Neanderthal ancestry and ~50% Eurasian ancestry. Correspondingly, Near Easterners showed a decline in Neanderthal ancestry proportional to their levels of African ancestry."

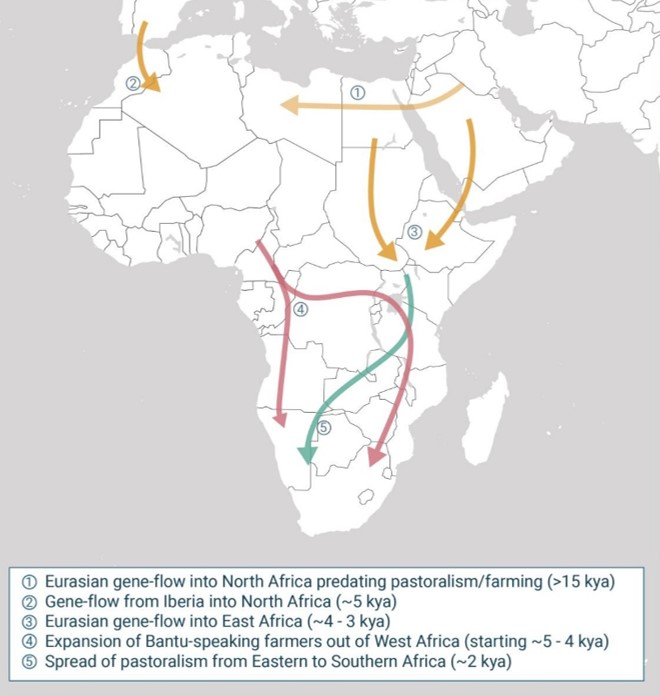
Human dispersals within Africa

Chen, Lu's publication found back-migrations contributed to the signal of Neanderthal ancestry in Africans. Data indicated that back-migrations giving Neanderthal sequences came after the split of Europeans and East Asians, from populations related to the European lineage. The overlap of this ancestral European ancestry and Neanderthal segments was highly significant.

== Average Eurasian frequencies in African populations ==
Estimates in Modern Africans
African Population Group	Linguistic Affiliation	Proportions of Ancestry
Afrikaner	Germanic	97.9%
Rashaida	Semitic	97.92%
Canarian	Romance	97.4%
Tunisian Jew	Semitic	96.49%
Moroccan Jew	Semitic	96.05%
Libyan Jew	Semitic	95.76%
Chaoui	Berber	85.12–87.51%
Moroccan	Semitic	80%
Tunisian	Semitic	79.37–81%
Egyptian	Semitic	79–86%
Figuig Berber	Berber	78.98%
Bouhria Berber	Berber	78.68%
Mozabite	Berber	77.33–82.39%
Asni Berber	Berber	76.99%
Algerian	Semitic	76.86–82.45%
Libyan	Semitic	76%
Saharawi	Semitic	74.32–84.9%
Tigrayan	Ethio-Semitic	50–50.4%
Beja	Cushitic	50%
Amhara	Ethio-Semitic	49.2–54%
Ethiopian Jew	Semitic	46.4–55.12%
Afar	Cushitic	46.0%
Kababish	Semitic	45.99%
Oromo	Cushitic	41.6–51%
Agaw	Cushitic	41–50%
Sudanese Arab	Semitic	40–52.73%
Nubian	Nubian	39.41–54.74%
Somali	Cushitic	38.4–44%
Cape Verdean	Romance	36–54%
Rendille	Cushitic	36%
Wolayta	Damotic	34.1–43%
Samburu	Nilotic	32.19%
Datooga	Nilotic	32.17%
Iraqw	Cushitic	30.3%
Malagasy	Austronesian	30–68%
Coloureds	Germanic	28–58%
Baggara	Semitic	25.57–33.6%
Fulani	Atlantic	21.4–29%
Toubou	Saharan	20–31.4%
Tutsi	Bantu	19.4–25%
Ogiek	Nilotic	19.2
Maasai	Nilotic	18.9–26.06%
Turkana	Nilotic	18.33%
Kikuyu	Bantu	16.4–18.8%
Aari	Aroid	15.7–18.2%
Sandawe	Sandawe	15.4%
Nama	Khoi	14%
Zaghawa	Saharan	12.58%
Kalenjin	Nilotic	10.99–15.86%
Kanembu	Saharan	10.97%
Hadza	Hadza	6.4–12.71%

Estimates in Ancient African Samples
African Population	Time Period	Number	Proportions of Ancestry
Egypt, Abusir-el-Meleq Egyptian	1388 BCE–426 CE	N=3	94–96%
Tunisia, Carthaginian	450–170 BCE	N=17	92.62–100%
Tunisia, Kerkouane Carthaginian	900–250 BCE	N=27	92.62–100%
Egypt, Nuerat Egyptian	2,868—2,492 BC	N=1	91.86%
Algeria, Numidian	1–700 CE	N=3	89.4–100%
Canary Islands, Guanche	3rd–16th Century CE	N=40	89.4%
Morocco, SKH (Skhirat-Rouazi)	6733–6121 BP	N=3	87%
Morocco, KTG (Kaf Taht el-Ghar)	7429–6945 BP	N=4	86%
Morocco, KEB (Khef el-Baroud)	3000 BCE	N=8	81.75%
Tunisia, Hergla	5900 BP	N=1	?
Tunisia, DEK (Doukanet el Khoutifa)	7000–6600 BP	N=5	?
Tunisia, Djebba	8000 BP	N=2	?
Morocco, IAM (Ifri n'Amar)	5000 BCE	N=7	?
Morocco, Iberomaurusian	15,100–13,900 YBP	N=7	60–70%
Algeria, ABR (Afalou Bou Rhummel)	10,000 BP	N=1	?
Morocco, OUB (Ifri Ouberrid)	7660–7506 BP	N=1	?
Sudan, Kulubnarti Nubian	650–1000 CE	N=66	46–64%
Sudan, Kadruka Nubian	4033 BP	N=1	45.2%
Tanzania, Luxmanda	3141–2890 BP	N=1	37.2–39%
Kenya, Pastoral Neolithic	3500–1500 BP	N=41	30–40%
Tanzania, Swahili	1250–1800 AD	N=80	26–68%
Libya, Takarkori	7,000 YA	N=2	25%

== See also ==
- African admixture in Europe
- Genetic history of Africa
- Genetic history of Europe
- Genetic history of North Africa
- Genetic history of the African diaspora
- Genetic history of the Iberian Peninsula
- Genetic history of the Middle East
- Neolithic Revolution

== Sources ==
- Morez Jacobs, Adeline; Irish, Joel D.; Cooke, Ashley; Anastasiadou, Kyriaki; Barrington, Christopher; Gilardet, Alexandre; Kelly, Monica; Silva, Marina; Speidel, Leo; Tait, Frankie; Williams, Mia; Brucato, Nicolas; Ricaut, Francois-Xavier; Wilkinson, Caroline; Madgwick, Richard; Holt, Emily; Nederbragt, Alexandra J.; Inglis, Edward; Hajdinjak, Mateja; Skoglund, Pontus; Girdland-Flink, Linus (2 July 2025). "Whole-genome ancestry of an Old Kingdom Egyptian". Nature. 644 (8077): 714–721. Bibcode:2025Natur.644..714M. doi:10.1038/s41586-025-09195-5. ISSN 1476-4687. PMC 12367555. PMID 40604286.
