= Chabbé =

Gorge in Sidamo Province, Ethiopia

Chabbé is a deep gorge in Sidamo Province, Ethiopia, 260 kilometres (160 miles) south of Addis Ababa, whose walls contain about 50 relief carvings that appear to depict female cattle. It is possible that the gorge was at one time a cave or tunnel.
