= Burayu =

Town in Oromia Region, Ethiopia

Burayu: Burraayyuu (Oromo); ቡራዩ (Amharic)
- City
- Location in Ethiopia
- Coordinates: 9°02′07″N 38°39′39″E
- Country: Ethiopia
- Region: (Oromia Region) Oromia
- Zone: Oromia Special Zone Surrounding Finfinne

Population (2007)
  - Total: 48,876
- Time zone: UTC+3 (EAT)

Burayu (Oromo: Burraayyuu, Amharic: ቡራዩ) is a city and special census zone in the Oromia Region of Ethiopia, located directly adjacent to the national capital city Addis Ababa (known as Finfinne in Oromo). With the rapid growth of the capital in recent decades and urban sprawl, the town has faced considerable economic and demographic pressures. The city's population has grown from merely 10,000 people in 1994 to an estimated 130,000 people three decades later; consisting of migrants from the rural south of Ethiopia looking for work along with former residents of Addis Ababa who sought cheaper housing in the surburbs.

In 2018, a massacre occurred amid communal clashes with individuals from the Oromo and Dorze ethnicities fighting in and around Burayu, in which 55 people were killed.

On 19 January 2022, during the Ethiopian Orthodox Christian religious festival Timkat, Oromia police shot into a crowd of Ethiopian Orthodox parishioners of the Saint Mary Church at Burayu. The security forces of Oromia killed two believers and several people were injured, including elderly, women and children. This incident was said to have happened because of the flag that the parishioners used, a green, yellow and red flag with the Ethiopian Orthodox logo over it.

== Demographics ==
Based on the 2007 Census conducted by the Central Statistical Agency of Ethiopia (CSA), this Zone has a total population of 63,889, of whom 31,516 are men and 32,373 are women; 48,876 people or 76.5% were urban inhabitants, while the rest were rural inhabitants. The four largest ethnic groups reported were the Oromo (58.07%), the Amhara (21.00%), the Gurage (9.12%), and the Gamo people (6.16%); all other ethnic groups made up 5.65% of the population. Oromo was spoken as a first language by 53.79%, Amharic was spoken by 30.68%, Gurage was spoken by 6.73% of the population, and Gamo was spoken by 6.04%; the remaining 2.76% spoke all other primary languages reported. The majority of the inhabitants practiced Ethiopian Orthodox Christianity, comprising 72.38% of the population, while 13.87% of the population were Muslim, and 12.58% of the population were Protestant.
