= Boreda =

Coordinates: 9.33°N 41.28°E

Boreda is one of the woredas in the Southern Nations, Nationalities, and Peoples' Region of Ethiopia. Part of the Gamo Gofa Zone, Boreda is bordered on the southeast by Mirab Abaya, on the southwest by Chencha, on the west by Kucha, and on the north by the Wolayita Zone. Towns in Boreda include Zefene. Boreda was part of former Boreda Abaya woreda.

== Demographics ==
Based on the 2007 Census conducted by the CSA, this woreda has a total population of 67,960, of whom 34,460 are men and 33,500 women; 2,761 or 4.06% of its population are urban dwellers.
