= Geze Gofa =

District in South Ethiopia Regional State, Ethiopia

Coordinates: 6°20′N 36°45′E

Geze Gofa is a woreda in the zone of Gofa Zuria in South Ethiopia Regional State in Ethiopia. Geze Gofa is bordered on the south by Oyda, on the west by Basketo Zone, on the northwest by Melokoza, and on the east by Demba Gofa. Towns in Geze Gofa include Bulki.

== History ==
Following heavy rains in the locality of Kencho-Shacha there were landslides on 21 and 22 July 2024 which buried two villages. At least 257 deaths were reported by 25 July.

== Demographics ==
Based on the 2007 census conducted by the CSA, this woreda has a total population of 68,650, of whom 34,078 are men and 34,572 women; 5,742 or 8.36% of its population are urban dwellers. The majority (63.17%) were P'ent'ay (Evangelical Protestants); 33.49% practiced Ethiopian Orthodox Christianity; 1.44% were Muslim; and 1.15% practiced traditional beliefs.
