= Sawla =

Sawla (Sa'a Wula):የምድር በር Felege Neway
- Location within Ethiopia
- Coordinates: 6°18′N 36°53′E
- Country: Ethiopia
- Region: Southern Nations, Nationalities and Peoples'
- Zone: Gofa Zone

Government
  - Mayor: Natinael Matiyos:Megenagna
- Elevation: 1,395 m (4,577 ft)

Population (2018)
  - Total: 85,704 more than
- Time zone: UTC+3 (EAT)
- Area code: 777
- Website: http://www.snnprsgofazone.gov.et

Sawla (also known as Felege Neway) is a town in southern Ethiopia. Located in Gofa Zone of the Southern Nations, Nationalities and Peoples' Region, this town has a latitude and longitude of 6°18′N 36°53′E with an elevation of 1,395 metres (4,577 ft) above sea level. It is surrounded by Demba Gofa woreda.

sawla is also neighbor of basketo

== History ==
The Founding of Sawla (Felege Neway).

The town was founded in 1959 during the reign of Emperor Haile Selassie. The main factors for its founding were its conducive climate and environment, fertile soil, suitability for expansion of infrastructure, the presence of an airport at that time, availability of water and different spices including coffee, and its importance as a business center. In 1963 the Gofa Awuraja was transferred to Sawla from Bulki and this played a role for the relatively fast structural development of the town.

The ancient name of Sawla is Felege Newaye. Sawla town has its present name from “Sa'a’’ ‘’wula” a Gofa word that means "the gate of land." This name was given because Sawla was serving as the center of business for the surrounding districts. In 2002/2003 the Southern Nations Nationality Peoples Regional State Works and Urban Development Bureau study has classified it as one of the city administrations in the region. Sawla is a reform and has a municipal status urban kebelle. The town got the first plan in 1965, and the current plan in 2002.

Records at the Nordic Africa Institute website provide details of the primary and secondary school in Sawla in 1968. A study to build a road to connect Sawla with Ameya in Ela woreda was conducted in 1996.

On 1 July 2008, the Ethiopian House of Peoples' Representatives voted to ratify a US$9 million loan agreement signed with the Arab Bank for Economic Development in Africa for the implementation of a rural electrification project linking Sawla and Key Afer in Hamer Bena woreda. The cost of this project would total US$43.89 million, of which the OPEC Fund for International Development has promised US$20 million, while the Ethiopian government will provide US$14 million.

== Demographics ==
Based on the 2007 Census conducted by the CSA, this town has a total population of 22,704, of whom 11,546 are men and 11,158 women. The majority of the inhabitants were Protestants, with 49.12% of the population reporting that belief, 45.22% practiced Ethiopian Orthodox Christianity, and 4.63% were Muslim.

The 1994 national census reported Sawla had a total population of 15,764 of whom 7,861 were men and 7,903 were women.

== Climate ==
Owing to its location near the equator, Sawla features a Tropical savanna climate (Köppen Aw). However, it is atypical for its classification, owing to its latitude and altitude. Despite the Aw classification, which indicates a dry winter and a wet summer, Sawla has two dry seasons, one occurring in winter, and another, less pronounced dry season in the summer. Similarly, there are two rainy seasons, the strongest being in the spring and a weaker one in autumn. This occurs due to the Intertropical Convergence Zone passing over the equatorial regions in the spring and fall, which is typical of the region. Although still meeting Köppen's 18 °C (64 °F) tropical threshold, temperatures are significantly cooler due to Sawla's altitude, thus giving the location characteristics closer to a highland climate.

Climate data for Sawla (Felege Neway), elevation 1,360 m (4,460 ft), (1971–2000)
Month	Jan	Feb	Mar	Apr	May	Jun	Jul	Aug	Sep	Oct	Nov	Dec	Year
Mean daily maximum °C (°F)	30.6 (87.1)	30.8 (87.4)	30.8 (87.4)	28.4 (83.1)	27.3 (81.1)	26.3 (79.3)	26.2 (79.2)	25.9 (78.6)	27.0 (80.6)	27.2 (81.0)	28.4 (83.1)	29.3 (84.7)	28.2 (82.7)
Mean daily minimum °C (°F)	18.0 (64.4)	18.3 (64.9)	18.4 (65.1)	17.6 (63.7)	16.9 (62.4)	17.2 (63.0)	16.9 (62.4)	16.8 (62.2)	16.8 (62.2)	16.5 (61.7)	16.8 (62.2)	16.8 (62.2)	17.3 (63.0)
Average precipitation mm (inches)	45.0 (1.77)	76.0 (2.99)	126.0 (4.96)	246.0 (9.69)	190.0 (7.48)	156.0 (6.14)	179.0 (7.05)	126.0 (4.96)	182.0 (7.17)	154.0 (6.06)	99.0 (3.90)	20.0 (0.79)	1,599 (62.96)
Average relative humidity (%)	60	63	68	72	76	76	62	59	62	78	57	67	67
Source: FAO

== Education ==
Educational Institutions

- The first Romanwork primary school was established in 1961 E.C. which was later renamed to Felegneway junior and secondary school. Present day it is called Botre School, which was promoted and renamed to Sawla Senior Secondary school in 1976 E.C., now called Sawla Secondary and Preparatory School.
- Sawla technical school was established in 1996 E.C., presently called Sawla Construction and Industrial College.
- The town has nine governmental and fourteen private educational institutions. From those governmental institutions, AMU Sawla campus is a higher educational institution, and Sawla Construction and Industrial College is in TVET level.

There are ten full primary and elementary schools, five secondary schools, and one preparatory school. From those private educational institutions there are six colleges and three full primary and elementary schools, and two secondary schools.

== Transport ==
Sawla is 514 kilometres (319 mi) from Addis Ababa, 258 kilometres (160 mi) southwest of Hawassa and 250 kilometres (160 mi) northwest of Arba Minch. The road from Addis Ababa to Sodo is asphalt. However, from Sodo to Sawla has not been paved yet. This does not mean that there is difficult transport. There is very good road and so many vehicles are coming and going. The town is serving as exclusive transport option for seven woredas: Meloko-koza, Basketo, Geze Gofa, Oyda, Demba Gofa, Zala, and Uba Debtetsehay.
