= Kemba (woreda) =

Coordinates: 6°00′N 37°10′E

Kemba is one of the woredas in the Southern Nations, Nationalities, and Peoples' Region of Ethiopia. Part of the Gamo Gofa Zone, Kemba is bordered on the southwest by the Debub Omo Zone, on the west by Uba Debretsehay, on the northwest by Zala, on the northeast by Deramalo, on the east by Bonke, and on the southeast by the Dirashe special woreda; the Weito River defines the boundary with Bonke and Dirashe. The major town in this woreda is Kemba.

Kemba is part of a region known for hilly and undulating midland and upper lowland terrain; due to terrain and weather patterns, less than one in five households is food secure. Food crops include maize, enset, sweet potatoes, taro, teff, and yams; income sources include butter and selling firewood. According to a 2004 report, Kemba had 31 kilometers of all-weather roads and 8 kilometers of dry-weather roads, for an average road density of 34 kilometers per 1000 square kilometers.

== Demographics ==
Based on the 2007 Census conducted by the CSA, this woreda has a total population of 155,979, of whom 79,273 are men and 76,706 women; 4,702 or 3.02% of its population are urban dwellers. The majority of the inhabitants were Protestants, with 46.42% of the population reporting that belief, 28.35% practiced traditional beliefs, and 15.92% practiced Ethiopian Orthodox Christianity.

The 1994 national census reported a total population for this woreda of 99,674 of whom 51,387 were men and 48,287 were women; 2,149 or 2.16% of its population were urban dwellers. The two largest ethnic groups reported in Kemba were the Gamo (96.94%), and the Amhara (2.49%); all other ethnic groups made up 0.57% of the population. Gamo is spoken as a first language by 89.97%, 5.75% Male, and 1.44% spoke Amharic; the remaining 2.84% spoke all other primary languages reported.
