= Samuel Fola =

Ethiopian politician

- Pola Sameela
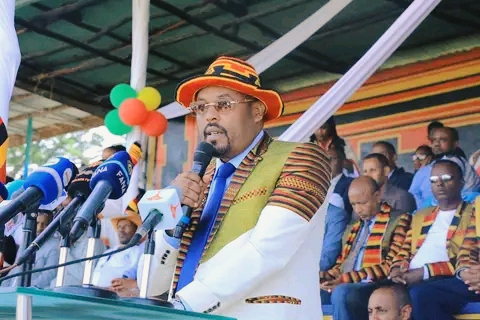

Wolayita Zone Administration Office

Chief Administrator
- In office 08 September 2023 – 10 September 2024
- Preceded by: Akililu Lemma
- Succeeded by: Petros Woldemariam

South Ethiopia Regional State Vital Registration Agency

Director
- Incumbent
- Assumed office 12 September 2024

Samuel Fola Kaltasa is an Ethiopian politician serving as director of South Ethiopia Regional State Vital Registration Agency. He was chief administrator of Wolayita Zone from 8 September 2023 to 10 September 2024. Samuel is from the Wolaitans and previously served as head of Prosperity Party branch office of Wolayita Zone.

Samuel Fola played an important role in making Wolaita's potential resources suitable for investment and beautifying Wolaita Sodo city.
