= Bonke =

Administrative subdivision of Ethiopia

Coordinates: 5°55′N 37°15′E

Bonke is one of the woredas in the Southern Ethiopia' Region of Ethiopia. Part of the Gamo Zone, Bonke is bordered on the south by the Derashe special woreda, on the west by the Weito River which separates it from Kemba, on the northwest by Deramalo, on the north by Dita, and on the east by Arba Minch Zuria. The major town in Bonke is Gerese.

According to a 2004 report, Bonke had 32 kilometers of all-weather roads and 7 kilometers of dry-weather roads, for an average road density of 49 kilometers per 1000 square kilometers.

== Demographics ==
Based on the 2007 Census conducted by the CSA, this woreda has a total population of 159,089, of whom 79,113 are men and 79,976 women; 6,347 or 3.99% of its population are urban dwellers. The majority of the inhabitants were Protestants, with 55.32% of the population reporting that belief, 27.18% practiced traditional beliefs, and 15.55% practiced Ethiopian Orthodox Christianity.

The 1994 national census reported a total population for this woreda of 109,441 of whom 55,246 were men and 54,195 were women; 2,452 or 2.24% of its population were urban dwellers. The two largest ethnic groups reported in Bonke were the Gamo (97.99%), and the Amhara (1.53%); all other ethnic groups made up 0.48% of the population. Gamo is spoken as a first language by 94.49%, 3.17% Zergulla, and 1.09% spoke Amharic; the remaining 1.25% spoke all other primary languages reported.
