= Mirab Abaya =

Mirab Abaya is one of the woredas in the Southern Nations, Nationalities, and Peoples' Region of Ethiopia. Part of the Gamo Gofa Zone, Mirab Abaya is bordered on the east and south by Lake Abaya which separates it from the Oromia Region on the east and Arba Minch Zuria on the south, on the west by Chencha, on the northwest by Borena, and on the north by the Wolayita Zone. Towns in Mirab Abaya include Birbir. Mirab Abaya was part of former Boreda Abaya woreda.

== Demographics ==
Based on the 2007 Census conducted by the CSA, this woreda has a total population of 74,967, of whom 37,444 are men and 37,523 women; 5,834 or 7.78% of its population are urban dwellers. The majority of the inhabitants were Protestants, with 64.9% of the population reporting that belief, 32.54% practiced Ethiopian Orthodox Christianity, and 1.93% were Muslim.
