= Zala (surname) =

Zala is a surname of Slovene origin. Notable people with the surname include:

- Boris Zala (born 1954), Slovak politician
- Dhavalsinh Zala, Indian politician
- José Solchaga Zala (1881-1953), Spanish general
- György Zala (canoeist) (born 1969), Hungarian sprint canoer
- György Zala (sculptor) (1858-1937), Hungarian sculptor
- Karola Zala (1879-1970), Hungarian actress
- Nick Zala (born 1959), English guitarist
- Vaidotas Žala, Lithuanian rally driver

== Fictional character ==
- Athrun Zala, a fictional character in the anime Gundam SEED and Gundam SEED DESTINY
- Patrick Zala, a character of the Cosmic Era timeline of the Gundam series

== See also ==
- Zala (given name)
