= Arba Minch Zuria =

District in South Ethiopia Regional State, Ethiopia

Coordinates: 6°00′N 37°35′E

Arba Minch Zuria is a woreda in South Ethiopia Regional State, Ethiopia. A part of the Gamo Zone located in the Great Rift Valley, Arba Minch Zuria is bordered on the south by the Dirashe special woreda, on the west by Bonke, on the north by Dita and Chencha, on the northeast by Mirab Abaya, on the east by the Oromia Region, and on the southeast by the Amaro special woreda. This woreda also includes portions of two lakes and their islands, Abaya found in Lante kebele and Chamo found in all Ganta Kanchama Ochole (Sile Sira) and Zeyise kebeles. Nechisar National Park is located between these lakes. City of Arba Minch is surrounded by Arba Minch Zuria.

According to a 2004 report, Arba Minch Zuria had 31 kilometers of asphalt roads, 69 kilometers of all-weather roads and 51 kilometers of dry-weather roads, for an average road density of 90 kilometers per 1000 square kilometers.

== History ==
Arba Minch Zuria was selected by the Ministry of Agriculture and Rural Development in 2004 as one of several woredas for voluntary resettlement for farmers from overpopulated areas, becoming the new home for a total of 3,754 heads of households and 15,016 total family members.

Heavy rains on the nights of 21–22 May 2005 caused the Sile and Sego Rivers to burst their banks, which displaced over 12,000 farmers. An unknown number of livestock were killed and an extensive area of crop fields destroyed.

== Demographics ==
Based on the 2007 Census conducted by the CSA, this woreda has a total population of 164,529, of whom 82,199 are men and 82,330 women; none of its population are urban dwellers. The majority of the inhabitants were Protestants, with 53.91% of the population reporting that belief, 29.31% practiced Ethiopian Orthodox Christianity, and 12.6% practiced traditional beliefs.

The 1994 national census reported a total population for this woreda of 153,550 of whom 78,158 were men and 75,392 were women; 40,020 or 26.06% of its population were urban dwellers. The five largest ethnic groups reported in Arba Minch Zuria were the Gamo (69.53%), the Amhara (7.94%), the Welayta (6.75%), the Zayse (6.02%), and the Oromo (3.64%); all other ethnic groups made up 2.28% of the population. Gamo is spoken as a first language by 65.77%, 16.97% Amharic, 5.93% Zergula, 5.13% Welayta, and 2.46% spoke Oromiffa; the remaining 3.74% spoke all other primary languages reported.
