= Gofa Zuria =

Zone in the South Ethiopia Regional State

Coordinates: 6°25′N 36°55′E

ጎፋ ዙሪያ (Amharic) Gofa Zuria (English "Greater Gofa Area") is a zone in the South Ethiopia Regional State of Ethiopia. It was previously one of the 17 Zones in the Southern Ethiopia Regional State of Ethiopia. Within the SNNPR, Gofa Zone was bordered to the south by Kamba and Daramalo woredas, to the southwest by the Debub (South) Omo Zone, to the west by the Basketo special woreda, to the northwest by Dawro Zone, to the north by the Dawro Zone, and to the east by Kucha. The administrative center of Gofa Zone is Sawla; other towns included Bulki. Gofa Zone is administratively subdivided into the aforementioned towns of Bulki and Sawla and the seven woredas of Demba Gofa, Gada, Geze Gofa, Melokoza, Oyda, Uba Debretsehay, and Zala.

Gofa Zone is part of a region known for hilly and undulating midland and upper lowland terrain. It is prone to floods and landslides. Due to terrain and weather patterns, less than one in five households is food secure. Food crops include maize, enset, sweet potatoes, taro, teff, and yams; income sources include butter and selling firewood. According to a 2004 report, Gofa Zuria had 75 kilometers of all-weather roads for an average road density of 44 kilometers per 1000 square kilometers.
