= Sidamo Province =

Former province in southern Ethiopia

Coordinates: 5°00′N 39°00′E

Sidamo Province prior to 1995

Sidamo Province (Amharic: ሲዳሞ) was a province in the southern part of Ethiopia, with its capital city at Irgalem, and after 1978 at Awasa. It was named after an ethnic group native to southern Ethiopia, called the Sidama, who are located in the south-central part of the country.

According to the old political division, Sidamo was bordered on the west by Gamu-Gofa, on the north by Shewa, on the north and east by Bale, a small portion on the southeast by Somalia, and on the south by Kenya.

== History ==
With its extensive coffee plantations, Sidamo was a province with abundant revenues and assigned to its rule were nobles loyal to the Emperor, such as Dejazmach Balcha Safo, who governed it at different times before the Italian occupation. Its largest settlement was Hawassa (Awasa).

Following the liberation of Ethiopia from Italy in 1942, the provinces of Borana and Welayta, created from conquered states of that name, were merged into Sidamo.

Sidamo was the scene of a revolt of the Gedeo people in 1960 who objected to a reorganization of the taxation system, which they believed was oppressive. The revolt was brutally suppressed; as Bahru Zewde notes, "Armed mostly with spears and swords, the peasants confronted a well-equipped enemy composed of land-lords and government troops." The Gedeo rebels were crushed in several engagements, and an arbitration commission headed by Afa Negus Eshate Gada not only found for land lords, but fined the elders of the Gedeo who had led the revolt.

Since the adoption of the 1995 Constitution of Ethiopia, Sidamo has been divided amongst the Southern Peoples Region which took its capital; the remainder contributing to the larger, more central, Oromia region and to the Somali Region as to a very small percentage.

== See also ==
- Sidamo language
- Ethiopian Sidamo (coffee)
- Chabbé
- History of Ethiopia
