= Zala (woreda) =

Coordinates: 6.536374°N 37.221251°E

Zala is one of the woredas in the South Regional State of Ethiopia. Part of the Gamo Gofa Zone, Zala is bordered on the southwest by Uba Debretsehay, on the northwest by Demba Gofa, on the northeast by Kucha, on the east by Deramalo, and on the southeast by Kemba. Zala was part of former Zala Ubamale woreda.

== Demographics ==
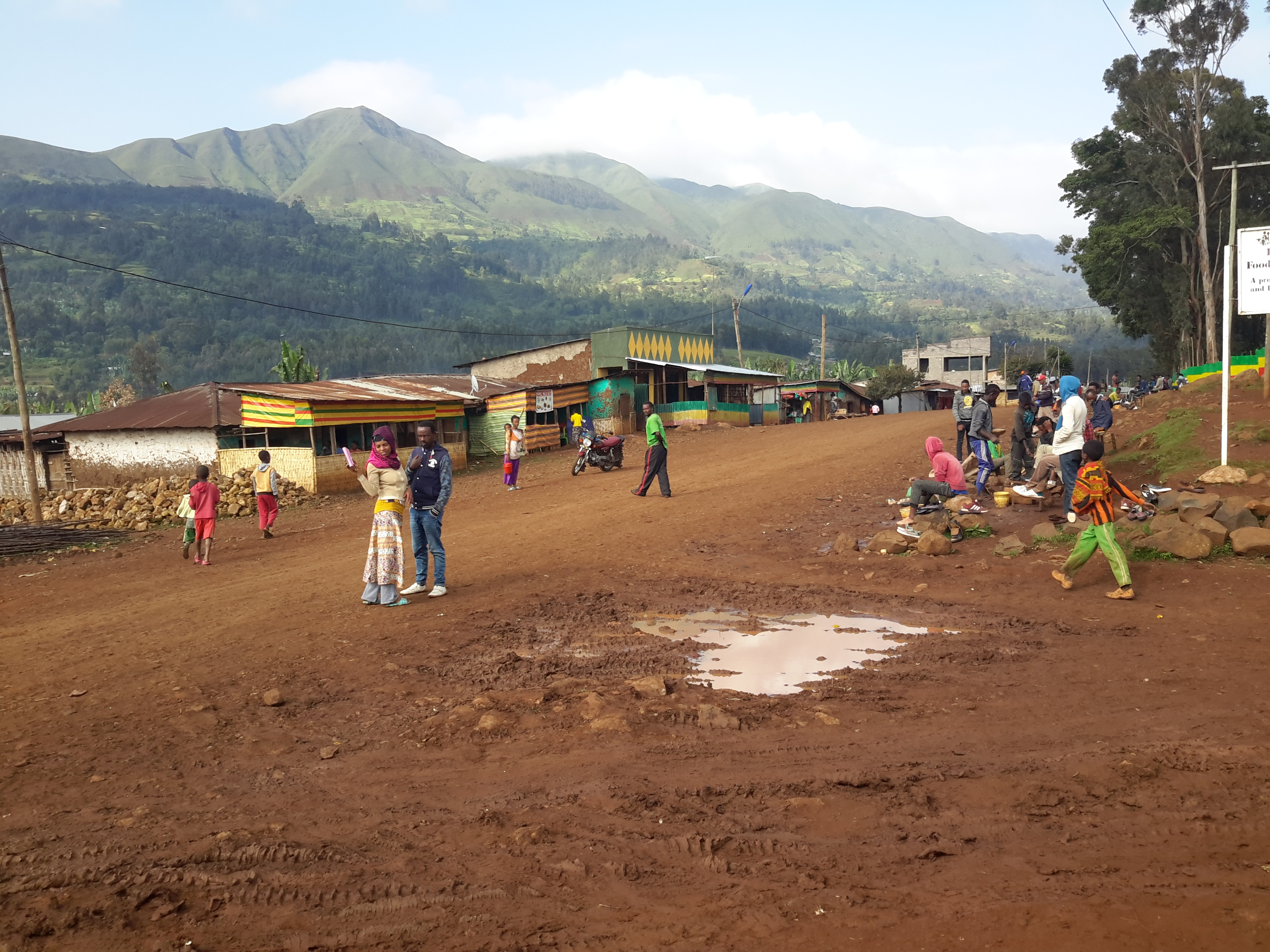
Zala town main road

Based on the 2007 Census conducted by the CSA, this woreda has a total population of 74,369, of whom 37,576 are men and 36,793 women; 2,137 or 2.87% of its population are urban dwellers. The majority of the inhabitants were Protestants, with 64.06% of the population reporting that belief, 16.46% practiced traditional beliefs, and 16.34% practiced Ethiopian Orthodox Christianity.
