= Gamo Zone =

Zone of South Ethiopia Regional State in Ethiopia

Coordinates: 6°15′N 37°0′E

A map of the regions and zones of Ethiopia

Gamo Zone is a Zone in the South Ethiopia Regional State of Ethiopia. Gamo is bordered on the south by the Dirashe Zone, on the southwest by South Omo Zone, on the west by Gofa Zone, on the north by Wolayita, on the northeast by the Lake Abaya which separates it from the Oromia Region, and on the southeast by the Amaro Zone. The administrative center of Gamo is Arba Minch.

Gamo has 431 kilometers of all-weather roads and 1000 kilometers of dry-weather roads, for an average road density of 45 kilometers per 1000 square kilometers. The highest point in this Zone is Guge (4,207 meters above sea level). The Lake Chamo is located at the southeastern part of Gamo just south of Lake Abaya. The Nechisar National Park is located between these two lakes.

Originally Gamo was part of the Semien (North) Omo Zone, and the 1994 national census counted its inhabitants as part of that Zone. However friction between the various ethnic groups in Semien Omo, which was often blamed on the Welayta for "ethnic chauvinism" and despite the efforts of the ruling party to emphasize the need to co-ordinate, consolidate, and unify the smaller ethnic units to achieve the "efficient use of scarce government resources", eventually led to the division of the Zone in 2000, resulting with the creation of not only the Gamo Gofa, but also the Dawro and Wolayita Zones and two special woredas.

Gamo music plays a prominent role in national entertainment in Ethiopia. The unique and fast-paced Gamo tunes have influenced several styles and rhythm as it continues to shape the identity of Ethiopian musical diversity. Various famous Ethiopian artists from other ethnic groups have incorporated Gamo musical style into their songs, including vocalists Tibebu Workeye, Teddy afro and Tsehaye Yohannes. Just as influential are Gamo traditional dance forms that are often adopted by musicians and widely visible in Ethiopian music videos.

The Gamo people are an Ethiopian ethnic group located in the Gamo Highlands of Southern Ethiopia. They are found in more than 40 communities, including Chencha, Bonke, Kucha, Garbansa, Zargula, Kamba, Dorze, Birbir, Ochello, Boroda, Ganta, Gacho Baba, Eligo, Shella, Kolle, Dita, Kogota and Daramalo.

== Demographics ==
Based on the 2021 population projection conducted by the Central Statistical Agency of Ethiopia (CSA), the zone has a total population of 10,602,063 (in an area of 18,010.99 square kilometers (18,010.99 sq km). Gamo has a population density of 311.08 per square kilometer

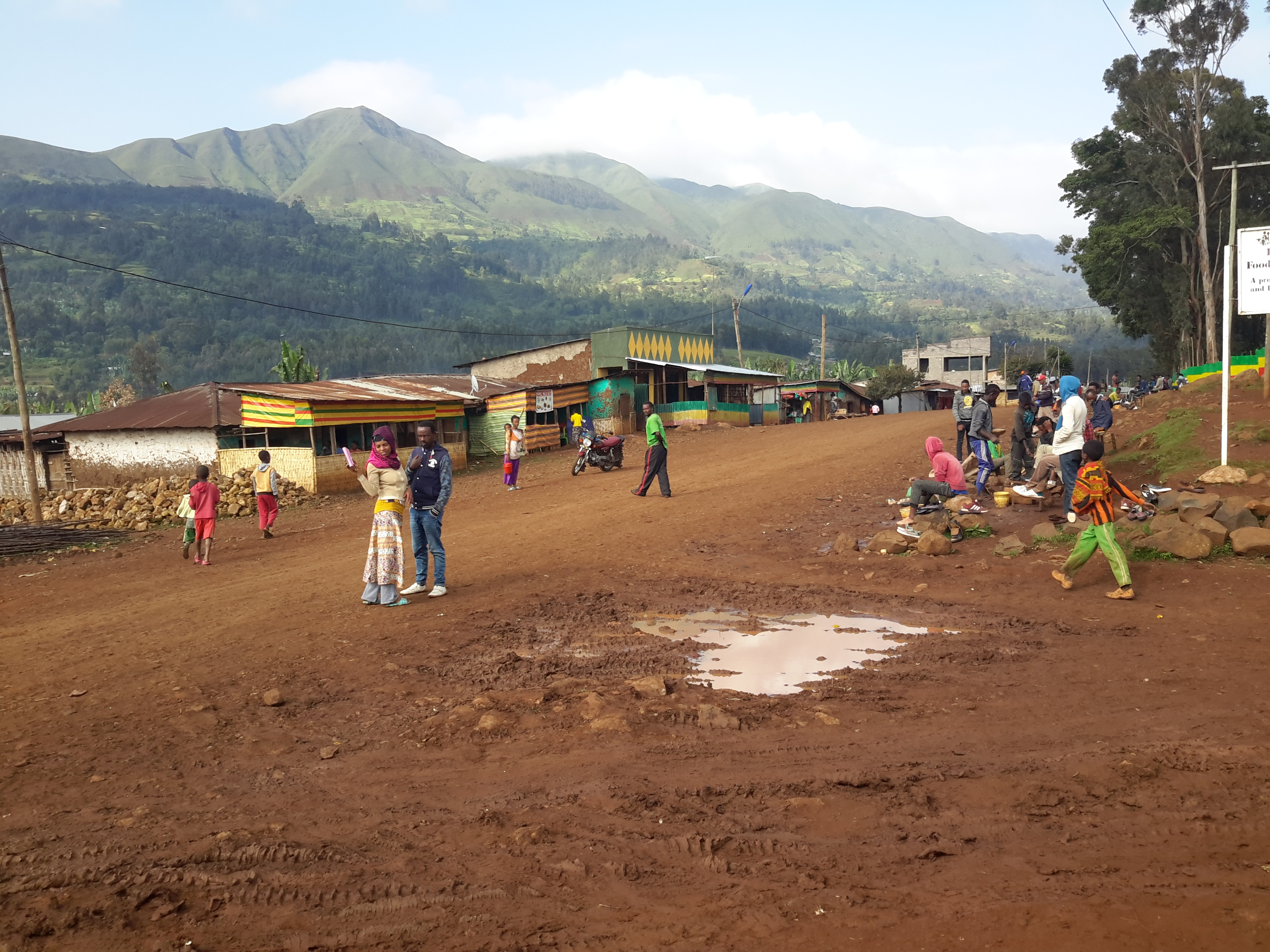
Zala town main road

A total of 337,199 households were counted in this Zone, which results in an average of 4.72 persons to a household, and 324,919 housing units. The largest ethnic groups reported in this Zone included the Gamo people (64.61%), the Gofa people (22.08%), the Oyda (2.35%), the Amhara (2.32%), the Welayta (1.91%), and the Basketo (1.38%); all other ethnic groups made up 5.35% of the population. Gamo is spoken as a first language by 63.75% of the inhabitants, 22.01% Gofa, 3.47% Amharic, 2.31% Basketo, 1.83% Oyda, and 1.74% Welayta; the remaining 4.89% spoke all other primary languages reported. 53.41% of the population said they were Protestants, 31.54% practiced Ethiopian Orthodox Christianity, and 11.13% observed traditional religions.

== Woredas ==
Current woredas are:

- Arba Minch Town
- Arba Minch Zuria
- Birbir Town
- Bonke
- Boreda
- Chencha
- Chencha Town
- Deramalo
- Dita
- Gacho Baba
- Garda Marta
- Geressie
- Geressie Town
- Kamba Town
- Kemba
- Kogota
- Kucha
- Kucha Alpha
- Mirab Abaya
- Selamber Town

Former woredas are:

- Boreda Abaya
- Dita Dermalo
- Gofa Zuria
- Zala Ubamale
