= Chencha =

Town in Ethiopia

Chencha Dincha
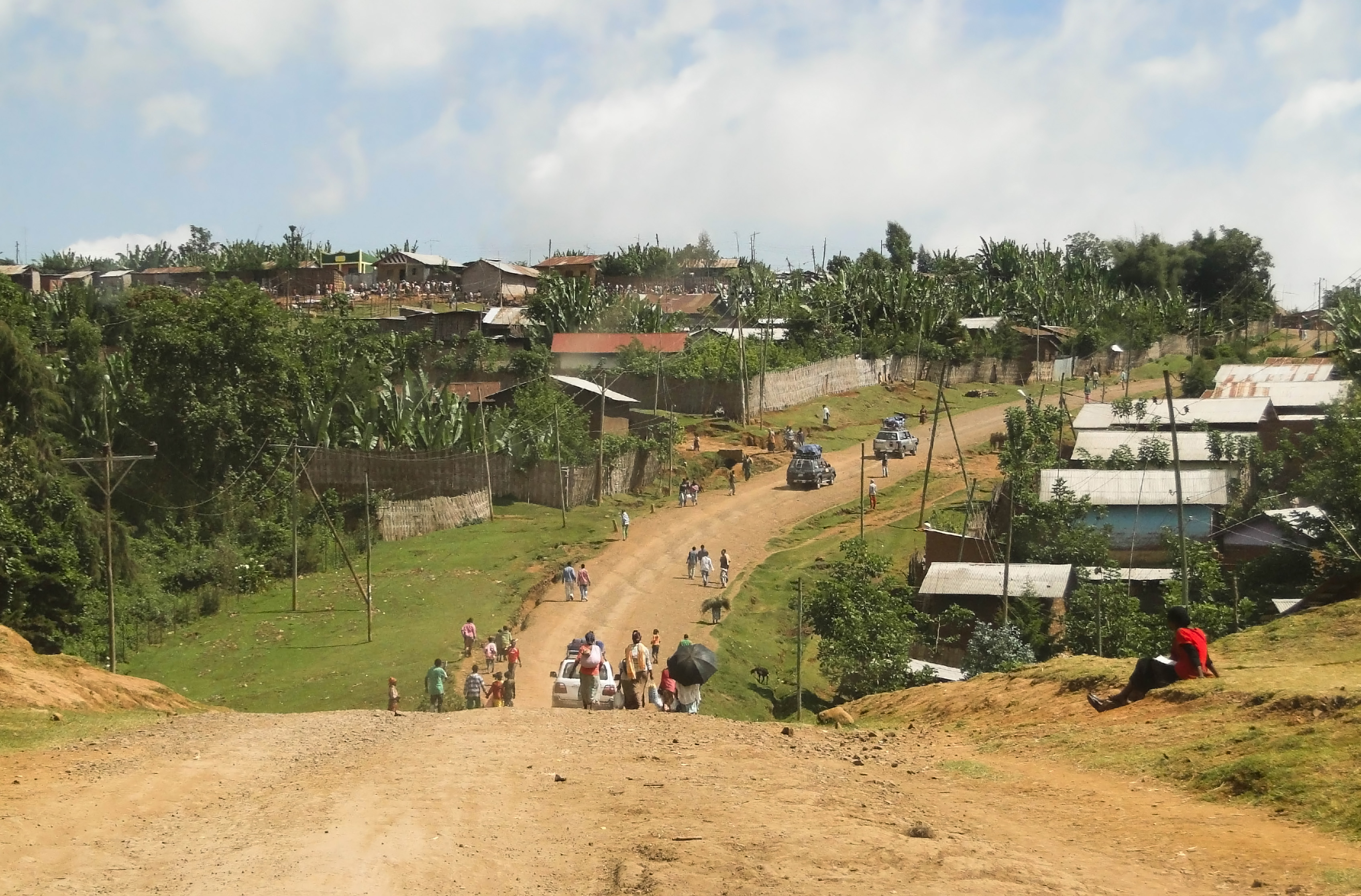

- Location within Ethiopia
- Coordinates: 6°15′N 37°34′E
- Country: Ethiopia
- Region: Southern Nations, Nationalities, and Peoples
- Zone: Gamo Gofa Omo
- Woreda: Chencha
- Elevation: 2,732 m (8,963 ft)

Population (2005)
  - Total: 10,488
- Time zone: UTC+3 (EAT)
  - Summer (DST): UTC+3 (not observed)
- Climate: Cfb

Chencha (also known as Dincha) is a town in southern Ethiopia. Located in the Gamo Gofa Zone of the Southern Nations, Nationalities, and Peoples Region, 37 kilometers north of Arba Minch, Chencha has a longitude and latitude of 6°15′N 37°34′E and an elevation of 2732 meters above sea level.

Based on figures from the Central Statistical Agency of Ethiopia published in 2005, Chencha has an estimated total population of 10,488 consisting of 4,750 men and 5,738 women. The 1994 national census reported this town had a total population of 5,787 of whom 2,630 were males and 3,157 were females. It is one of three towns in Chencha woreda.

== History ==
Dejazmach Beyene Merid had established his seat as governor of Gamo-Gofa at Chencha by 1935, when he was visited by missionaries and a German expedition.

Chencha had been the capital of Gamo-Gofa province until those offices were transferred to the more accessible city of Arba Minch in 1962. It has been the administrative center of Chencha woreda since at least 1964. Chencha is currently divided into Chencha town administration and Chencha Zuria woredas (the surrounding as a new woreda with its full governmental structures) and Ezo woreda, formerly among the kebeles in the chencha woreda. The town of Checha is known for traditional clothing of Shema as it includes the Dorze and other communities with traditional weaving undertakings. Chencha is a temperate climate zone with the potential and current production capacity of fruits and vegetables, different kinds of root plants, cereals, and timber trees. The town of Chencha is a tourist attracting place with the endowed beauty of nature and the topography of the town. Chencha is known for its tall bamboo houses. Especially older ones can be up to 5 metres. In former times an ostrich egg used to be placed at the top. The life span of a bamboo house is about 60 years and more. They may be carried to a new site if rotting parts or termites become a problem.

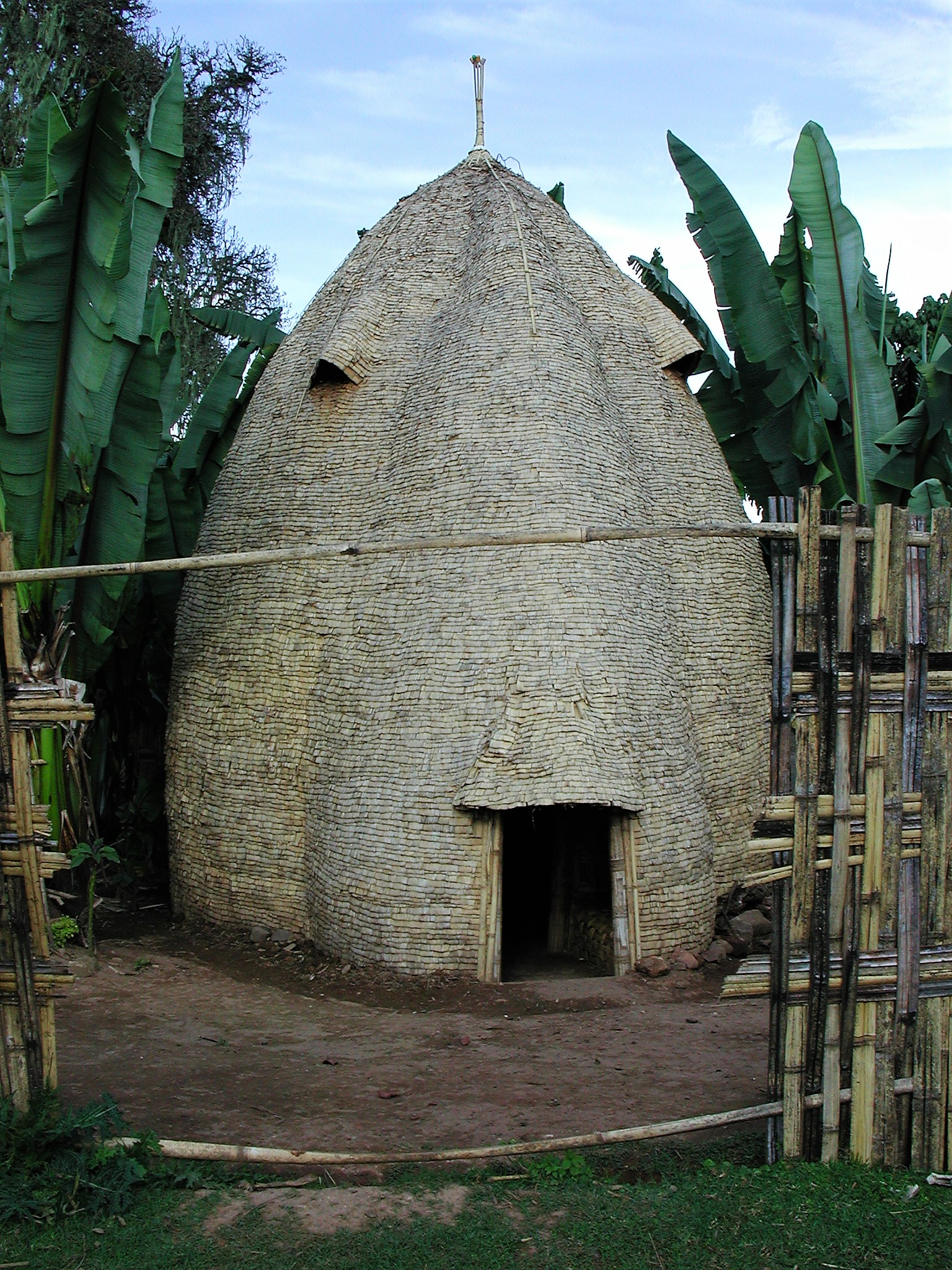
Bamboo house in Chencha, 2003

== Climate ==
Climate data for Chencha, elevation 2,580 m (8,460 ft)
Month	Jan	Feb	Mar	Apr	May	Jun	Jul	Aug	Sep	Oct	Nov	Dec	Year
Mean daily maximum °C (°F)	23.1 (73.6)	22.7 (72.9)	22.2 (72.0)	20.5 (68.9)	20.2 (68.4)	18.8 (65.8)	17.7 (63.9)	17.5 (63.5)	19.5 (67.1)	20.3 (68.5)	21.7 (71.1)	23.0 (73.4)	20.6 (69.1)
Daily mean °C (°F)	15.6 (60.1)	16.2 (61.2)	16.1 (61.0)	14.6 (58.3)	14.6 (58.3)	13.8 (56.8)	13.1 (55.6)	12.8 (55.0)	14.1 (57.4)	14.6 (58.3)	15.3 (59.5)	15.6 (60.1)	14.7 (58.5)
Mean daily minimum °C (°F)	8.3 (46.9)	9.6 (49.3)	9.8 (49.6)	8.8 (47.8)	9.0 (48.2)	8.8 (47.8)	8.3 (46.9)	8.1 (46.6)	8.8 (47.8)	9.0 (48.2)	8.8 (47.8)	8.3 (46.9)	8.8 (47.8)
Average precipitation mm (inches)	45 (1.8)	50 (2.0)	95 (3.7)	164 (6.5)	181 (7.1)	89 (3.5)	135 (5.3)	105 (4.1)	112 (4.4)	169 (6.7)	70 (2.8)	18 (0.7)	1,233 (48.6)
Average relative humidity (%)	62	60	65	75	77	80	80	77	81	71	70	58	71
Source: FAO

== Notes ==
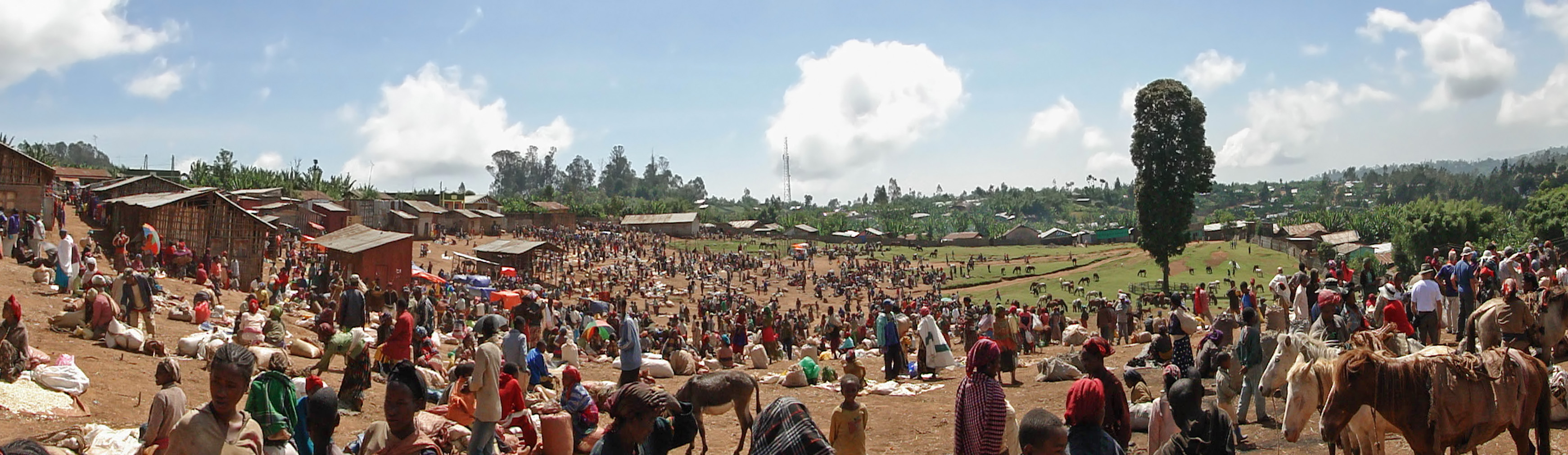
Market day in Chencha
