= Dita Dermalo =

Coordinates: 6°15′N 37°20′E

Dita Dermalo was a former woreda in the Gamo Zone of the Southern Nations, Nationalities, and Peoples' Region (SNNPR) of Ethiopia. It was bordered by Bonke to the south, Kemba to the southwest, Zala Ubamale to the west, Kucha to the north, and Chencha to the east. Its main towns were Wacha and Zeda. The district has since been divided into two distinct woredas: Dita and Dermalo (now part of the Gamo Zone in the South Ethiopia Regional State).

== Overview ==
Rivers in this woreda include the Zage. Dita Dermalo is part of a region known for hilly and undulating midland and upper lowland terrain; due to terrain and weather patterns, less than one in five households is food secure. Food crops include maize, enset, sweet potatoes, taro, teff, and yams; income sources include butter and selling firewood.

Although this woreda was in existence before the incorporation of the Federal Democratic Republic of Ethiopia under the name of "Dita", its current area dates from 1996. That year the adjacent woreda of "Dera-Malo" lost its lowlands to Kucha, and the highlands of that woreda joined to Dita to become Dita Dermalo.

== Demographics ==
Based on figures published by the Central Statistical Agency in 2005, this woreda has an estimated total population of 154,573, of whom 78,505 are men and 76,068 are women; 2,099 or 1.36% of its population are urban dwellers, which is less than the Zone average of 8.5%. With an estimated area of 654.85 square kilometers, Dita Dermalo has an estimated population density of 236 people per square kilometer, which is greater than the Zone average of 156.5.

The 1994 national census reported a total population for this specific woreda of 109,397 of whom 53,844 were men and 55,553 were women; 1,159 or 1.06% of its population were urban dwellers. The largest ethnic group reported in Dita Dermalo was the Gamo (99.29%); all other ethnic groups made up 0.71% of the population. Gamo was the dominant first language, spoken by 99.49% of the inhabitants; the remaining 0.51% spoke all other primary languages reported.
