= Gofa people =

Goffa or Gofa are an Omotic ethnic group indigenous to Omo Valley located in Ethiopia's Southern Nations, Nationalities, and Peoples' Region. According to 2007 census there are 363,009 ethnic Goffa in Ethiopia, which make up around 0.49% of the country's total population. Traditional language of the Goffa is the Goffa language, which belongs to the Omotic branch of the Afroasiatic languages.

== Gofa ==
The term Gofa originated from Gosha's mother Goffe and the heroic King Goba (meaning brave, strong warrior) while he was ruling the Gofa region. According to the elders, there were three historical perspectives on the naming of the Gofa people. One perspective is associated with Gofa patterns of settlement: from ancient times the name Gofa was given to people who settled in the mountains. The second perspective is that the name Gofa derives from a powerful warrior leader, originally named Kawo Gooba, which gradually became Gofa. There is also the third account from elders that the name Gofa is the original name of the people in the first homeland, Gibe, which is derived from the line of the ancestral line of descent. This claim is further supported by the genealogical structure of the Gofa people.

== History ==
There are two perspectives about the origin of the Gofa people. The first perspective is that some clans (qommos) are just native to the land, and call themselves "Bita Tusi", literally meaning "emerged out of the land itself". These clans include Goshana, Kalata, Gamo Maala, Hirara, and Maka. The other perspective states that there are also clans / qommos from the neighboring areas and settled in the area. This movement extended up to Bubula in the upper Gibe River. These clans include Galo-Malla, Walayta Malla, Boroda-Malla, Ayka, Fastigara, Enigara etc. From the above two perspectives one can conclude that, however differently clans explain their origins in various ways, both groups settled in the area for a long period of time and identified themselves as Gofa. According to the second perspective the first homeland of Gofa was Bubula and Gibe in the upper valley of the Omo River. It is said that at a certain time in the past, from this original land the people moved towards Southern part following the Omo River basin. Immediately after they moved southward following the Omo River, they found their first settlement at Wurki, in today's North western part of Demba Gofa. There are several reasons cited as the cause for their southward movements. One of the pushing factors is unsuitable natural environment in the previous settlements. Besides, the search for suitable natural environment: pasture and fertile land can be sited as the pulling factors towards their current settlements. There are also various groups who come to the Gofa area from the surrounding ethnic groups. Informants mentions Shasha, Kolta, Zulu Kalacha, Waysara, Woide Dargintha, Woide Yallo, Layma and Tsanga Darara as the second settlement places of the Gofa. In most cases, the southward movement of the people was made under the leadership of their respective Kawo, the independent leaders of different Gofa chiefdoms/kingdoms, following the mountainous chain under the leadership of their Kawo until Kencho Gerera. Kencho Gerera is now located in Geze Gofa woreda between Berza and Kencho kebeles. The southward movement of the Gofa was not peaceful. This was mainly because the most fertile favorable land chosen by the Gofa nationality to settle was not empty; there were settlers in the land. So, the contradicting interest necessitates some sort of conflicts between the one that opted to occupy the land and the previous settlers of the land. As most of the elders agree, others occupied the current Gofa – land. When the expanding Gofa nationality tried to occupy the land confrontation occurred. The others attempted to resist the expansion of the Gofa. However, since the expanding Gofa nationality were led by a unified command of the Kawo (literally king), they have the advantage to take most of the land. It is argued that there were continuous conflicts and disputes that resulted in the eviction of the others. On the conflict events between the expanding Gofa and the resisting inhabitants, two brothers of Buraqa led the movement of Gofa. The one who become the successor of his father become one of the powerful Kawo called Kawo Gaamo Buraqa.

== Culture and society ==
As it widely believed by the elders, the Gofa nationality has two ancestral forefathers which are derived into two ancestral lines. The two ancestral clans are called Maala and Dogala. These two clans further subdivide into various groupings, called qommo. Some of the groups or qommos under Maala include Goshana, Ayka, Maka, Kalata, Borodamaala, Golomala, Buyla, Gaamo-maala, Sili-maala, Lontso-maala, and others. The groups or qommos under Dogala include Zutuma, Worze, Gawuraro, Ayfarso, Amari, Gudarti, Muquriti, Sachi, Sawa, Ganji, etc.

The Gofa call their father "Aawa" and their mother "Ayye". Daughters are called macho and sons Ade nayta. Male siblings are called esha and female siblings micho. The Gofa kinship system in general follows the bifurcate collateral type; father's brother and mother's brother are differentiated as aayo and aawa, and from each other by the terms aawa isha and awesho (awta) respectively. Likewise, mother's sisters and father's sisters are differentiated from each other by the terms aaye micho and aawa micho respectively. Father's father is called aawa aawa and father's mother as aawa aaye, while mother's father is aaye aawa and mother's mother takes the name aaye aaye.
