= Kucha (woreda) =

Coordinates: 6°30′N 37°20′E

Kucha is one of the woredas in the Gamo zone. The major town in Kucha is Selamber.

== Overview ==
Kucha (QUCA in the local language) is part of a region known for hilly and undulating midland and upper lowland terrain; due to terrain and weather patterns, less than one in five households is food secure. Food crops include maize, enset, sweet potatoes, taro, teff, and yams; income sources include butter, peanut, beans and selling firewood. According to a 2004 report, Kucha had 58 kilometers of all-weather roads and 8 kilometers of dry-weather roads, for an average road density of 48 kilometers per 1000 square kilometers.

Although this woreda was in existence before the incorporation of the Federal Democratic Republic of Ethiopia, its current area dates from 1996. That year the lowlands of the neighboring Dera-Malo woreda were joined to Kucha, and the highlands of that woreda joined to Dita, becoming Dita Dermalo.

== Demographics ==
Based on the 2021 Census conducted by the CSA, this woreda has a total population of 400,287, of whom 200,207 are men and 200,080 women; 5,123 or 3.43% of its population are urban dwellers. The majority of the inhabitants were Protestants, with 49.83% of the population reporting that belief, 45.73% practiced Ethiopian Orthodox Christianity,3.36% catholics and 1.08% practiced traditional beliefs.

The 1994 national census reported a total population for this woreda of 102,598 of whom 51,657 were men and 50,941 were women; 1,931 or 1.88% of its population were urban dwellers. The largest ethnic group reported in Kucha was the Kucha; all other ethnic groups made up 1.48% of the population. Qucatto language was the dominant first language, spoken by 99.01% of the inhabitants; the remaining 0.99% spoke all other primary languages reported.
