= Gamo people =

Ethnic group native to Ethiopia

Gamo People
Gamó (Gamo)
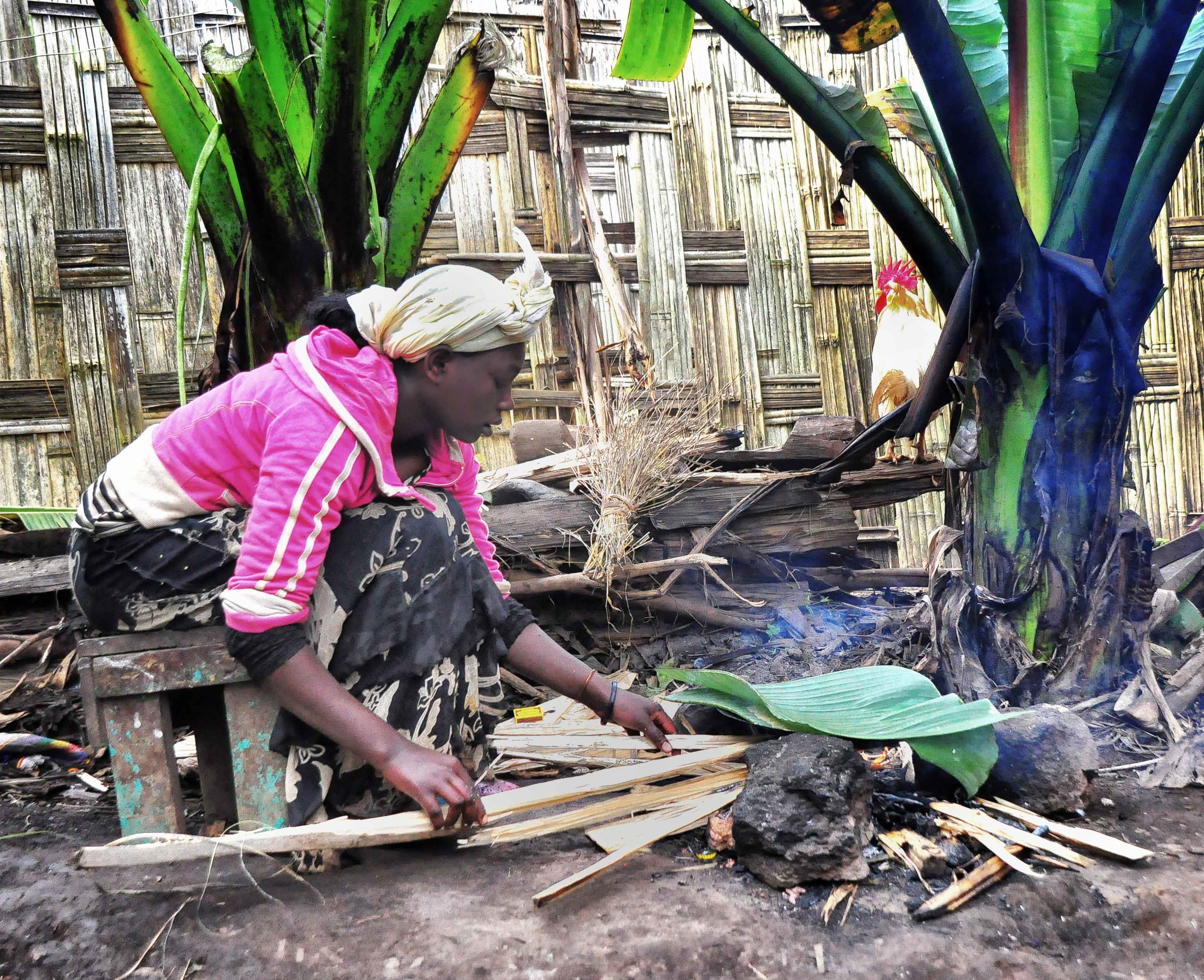

Languages
- Gamo

Religion
- Significant Majority: Christianity (P'ent'ay); Minority: Traditional faith

Related ethnic groups
- Dorze people

The Gamo people are an Ethiopian ethnic group located in the Gamo Highlands of southern Ethiopia. They are found in more than 42 communities, including Chencha, Bonke, Kucha, Garbansa, Zargula, Kamba, Dorze, Birbir, Ochello, Boroda, Ganta, Gacho Baba, Eligo, Shella, Kolle, Dita, Kogo and Daramalo.

== History ==
The name "Gamo" is similar to another word in Gamo language called Gaammo which means 'lion', and it is believed to refer to the group's legacy as one of the Omotic peoples. Along with the Gofa people, they gave their names to the former Gamo-Gofa province of Ethiopia. Gofa broke away from the Gamo-Gofa zone in 2019.

== Language ==
Initially, the word Gamo was thought to be a fruit by foreigners, mainly because the Gamo people are known for some of their fruits. The Ethiopian government eventually recognized the language in 2000 to be taught in schools.

== Population ==
The 2007 Ethiopian national census reported that 1,104,360 people (or 1.56% of the Ethiopian population) identified as Gamo, of whom 139,308 were urban inhabitants and 965,052 rural.

The South Etiopía State are home to the majority of the Gamo people.

== Economy ==
The Gamo sell fruit in Ethiopia's capital, Addis Ababa, including, bananas, mangos, apples, and papayas. The Gamo have developed the ability to conserve crop genetic resources while also practicing effective farming strategies. This has led them to grow over 65 varieties of barley, over 12 varieties of wheat, over 100 varieties of enset, as well as dozens of varieties of cassava, taro, and yam. Many Gamo people are weavers that make traditional clothes such as Kuta, Gabi, Buluko, and Dunguza.

== Religion and history ==
Originally, their belief system was rooted in traditional African religions, closely tied to nature. Today most are members of the Ethiopian Orthodox Tewahedo Church or Protestantism P'ent'ay. The missionary activities of the Christians brought disturbances and tensions in their traditional society, threatening the old way of life and ecological balance.

The Gamo's strict social hierarchy offer an example of how a caste system manifests itself in material culture. Artisans, such as ground stone makers and potters, rely primarily on craft production for their livelihood.

== Sport ==
Arba Minch Town Football Club (The Crocodiles) is playing in Betking Ethiopian premier league and Gamo Chencha Football Club (The Lions) is playing in Ethiopian Super League. Both are from Gamo zone.
