= Konso (disambiguation) =

Konso may refer to:

- Konso, town in Southern Ethiopia
- konso people, Lowland East Cushitic-speaking ethnic group primarily inhabiting south-western Ethiopia.
- Konso Zone, Zone in SNNPR
- Konso language, Lowland East Cushitic language spoken in southwest Ethiopia
