= Waaqeffanna =

Ethnic religion practiced by Oromo people

Waaqeffanna is an ethnic religion indigenous to the Oromo people of the Horn of Africa and to other Cushitic-speaking peoples. Its name derives from Waaqa, an ancient name for the creator in several Cushitic languages, including those of the Oromo and the Somali. Adherents are known as Waaqeffataa and believe in a supreme being, Waaqa Tokkicha ("the one God"). Estimates of the number of practising Waaqeffataa in Ethiopia vary widely, from roughly one million to five million, depending on which subsets of the religion are counted.

Waaqeffataa hold that Waaqa created the universe and is manifest through the Ayyaana, intermediary spirits that carry communication between the creator and creation but cannot themselves create. Every creature is believed to be assigned an Ayyaana for guidance and protection, and the spirits are held to possess certain men and women. Adherents live according to Safuu, the moral and legal principles governing human dealings with Waaqa, the breach of which is regarded as sin.

Religious authority rests with the Qaalluu institution, whose male Qaalluu and female Qaallitti serve as priests and ritual leaders, are expected to remain politically neutral, and hold the power to grant or withhold blessing from the leadership of the Gadaa system. Pilgrims historically travelled long distances to be anointed by the Abbaa Muudaa, the highest-ranking Qaalluu. The principal ceremony is Irreecha, a thanksgiving festival held twice yearly that draws large gatherings to Lake Hora Arsedi at Bishoftu. The religion produced no canonised scripture and was transmitted orally, though some communities have more recently written down hymns and religious texts.

== Belief ==
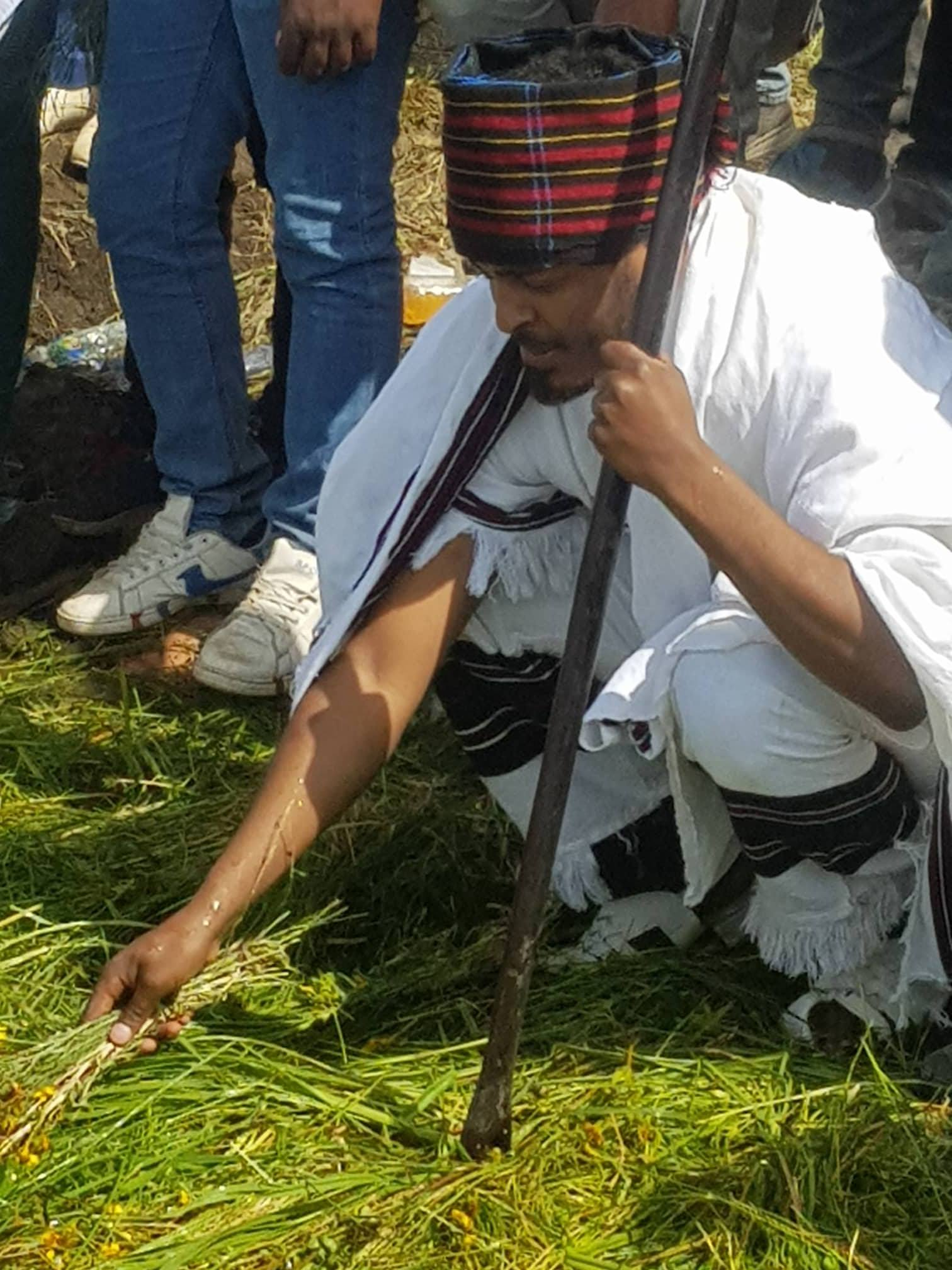
Irreechaa celebration at Lake Harsadii

The main religious belief of Waaqeffanna is that Waaqa (the creator) is the creator of the universe and has many manifestations known as Ayyaana. The Ayyaana serve as intermediary spirits between Waaqa and his creations. The Ayyaana (spirits) are known to possess chosen men and women, who are then given the title Qallu and Qallitti respectively. All Uuma (creatures) are believed to be assigned an Ayyaana by Waaqa for guidance and protection.

Waaqeffataas live according to Safuu, the moral and legal principles that guide the interactions of humans with Waaqa. The breach of Safuu is regarded a sin and is condemned by Waaqa.

=== Waaqa ===
Waaqa is the supreme being and is omniscient, omni-benevolent and omnipotent. He is also just and loving. This supreme being is addressed through a variety of names in the different regions and many believe that the term Waaqa means 'the God with many names'. The Oromo people also use the term Waaqa Gurr'acha to address the creator, which translates as "Black (Gurr'acha) God (Waaqa)". The term is believed to indicate that Waaqa is the origin of everything, is mysterious and they are the one that can not be interfered with.

=== Ayyaana ===
The Ayyaana are believed to be divinities that serve as messengers between Waaqa and their creations. The Ayyaana are not capable of creation but provide communication. They possess men and women and thus speak with the people. Different regions of Oromo hold varying beliefs and understandings of what the Ayyana (spirit) are capable of. While some argue that Ayyanna can't act alone without an order from Waaqa, others claim that the Ayyaana are able to directly affect all aspects of life. Waaqeffataas believe that all creations of Waaqa have their own assigned Ayyaana. The Ambo Oromo have identified several Ayyaanas by lineage and clan. There are power hierarchies within different Ayyaana. For example, the Ayyaana of a clan is stronger than the Ayyaana of a lineage which in turn is stronger than the Ayyana of an individual. It is very common for people to paint their skin with the local African bush species "aaasqaama". The followers will char this bush and cover their skin with the charred paint, to devote themselves to Iinqqaama.

=== The Qaalluu institution ===
The Qaalluu is an important institution in the Oromo religious and social system. It serves to protect the Oromo culture and tradition. Qaalluu is from the Oromiffa word qull, which translates as 'pure, holy, sacred, blameless, black'. In the Qaalluu institution, the Qaallu (men) or Qaallitti/Ayyaantu (women) are believed to be messengers of Waaqa because they are attached to the Ayyaana. The Qaalluu/Qaallitti serve as high ranked priests and ritual leaders that can officiate for Waqeffanna among the Oromo. There are a variety of myths on how the first Qaalluu (high priest) originated. While some believe they fell from the sky and others claim they were found with the first black cow, there is no consensus on their divine origin. The Qaalluu and Qaallitti are believed to be the guardians of the laws of Waaqa. They live and perform ritual activities (dalalga) in the traditional Oromo ritual hall that is known as Galma. A myriad of factors including seniority, acceptance in the community, moral qualification, social status and other leadership qualities are taken into consideration when a Qaalluu/Qaalliti is chosen.

As the messengers of Waaqa, the Qaalluu and Qaallitti have a moral and social responsibility to uphold the highest standards of ethics and practice it. The Qaalluu institution is expected to remain politically neutral and serve as a place of fair deliberation. Similarly, the priests are obliged to condemn tyranny and support the democratic Gadaa system of the Oromo. The Qaalluu/Qaalliti have the power to give or withhold blessings to the Gadaa leadership as they see fit.

=== Abbaa Muudaa pilgrimage ===
The phrase Abbaa Muudaa translates as 'the father of ointment'. In Waaqeffanna, the Abbaa Muudaa is regarded as the highest Qaalluu and a prophet. Waaqeffataas from all over the region travel long distances on pilgrimage to see Abbaa Muudaa. This travel entails honoring the Abbaa Muuda but also receiving a blessing and anointment. The Waaqeffataas that take on the pilgrimage are chosen by their clans and are allowed to perform religious rituals upon return to their homes. People who make the journey must pass the highest moral standards of the society. They must be married and also circumcised after forty years in the Gadaa system.

The pilgrims bring a bull and sheep as a gift to Abbaa Muudaa. After anointment, the pilgrims are given the title Jila, which means 'saintly people'. The Jila are qualified to perform rituals and sermons in their clans and villages and they serve as a connection between the Abbaa Muudaa and the people. The Abbaa Muuda was usually located on the Ethiopia highlands of the middle south. Before the 1900s, the Abba Muudaa's were located at Mormor in Bali, Wallaga, Wallal, Harro Walabu, Ballo Baruk, and Debanu. Today, the Qaalluu institution still exists in selected parts of the region, including the Guji and Borana areas.

=== Maaram ===
The Maaram in Waaqeffana refers to the divinity of women. Maaram is another creation of Waaqa and is the mother of the ocean. Maaram is believed to help barren women conceive a child and help pregnant women give birth without complications. The Qaalluu pray for Maaram biweekly for fertility and children.

== Religious ceremonies ==
=== Irreechaa ===
Irreechaa is a thanksgiving ceremony that is celebrated twice a year, in the spring (Irreecha Birraa) and the autumn (Irreecha Arfaasaa). This is the ceremony where the Oromo give thanks to Waaqa and admire and appreciate his creations and their interconnectedness. The Irrecha Birraa, also known as Irrecha Melka, is held by Lake Hora Harsedi, a sacred lake in Bishoftu. Millions of people travel every year to the lake to celebrate the holiday.

=== Ekeraa ===
The Waaqeffataas believe that when a person dies, they will be reunited with former loved ones in Iddoo Dhugaa, which translates as 'place of truth'. Waaqeffataas honor [believe in] the spirits of those who have died and they observe [pray to] ekeraa (the spirit of deceased person). Every year in December, they celebrate the Ekeraa with bread, cheese with butter, beer and honey.

== Scripture ==
The Waaqeffanna religion historically did not produce a canonized scripture. The religion was traditionally practiced in a decentralized and oral manner. Some Waaqeffataas believe that Waaqa endowed human beings with minds capable of distinguishing right from wrong, granting them Ayyaana to guide them and help them communicate with God.

For Waaqeffataas, it is not necessary to possess a codified scripture in order to practice their religion. They believe in God by observing and appreciating the created order established by Waaqa. For example, the sun rises in the morning and sets in the evening, a cow gives birth to a calf, and immediately after birth the calf instinctively knows how to suckle without having read any book. These are understood as cyclical orders established by God. Among some Oromo, there is a traditional tale that God originally gave them a book, but a cow swallowed it. According to the tale, God did not give them another book and no longer expects Waaqeffatoota to follow the rules of any written scripture.

Some followers of Waaqeffanna have produced religious texts, such as the Daaniyaa. However, this has occurred in a decentralized manner, and not all Waaqeffataas regard it as authoritative scripture. Waaqeffanna poetry and hymns, which were traditionally transmitted orally, are also increasingly being written down. Nevertheless, written Waaqeffanna literature varies between communities and regions.
