= Oromo people =

Cushitic ethnic group

Oromos
Oromoo (Oromo) Afaan Oromo
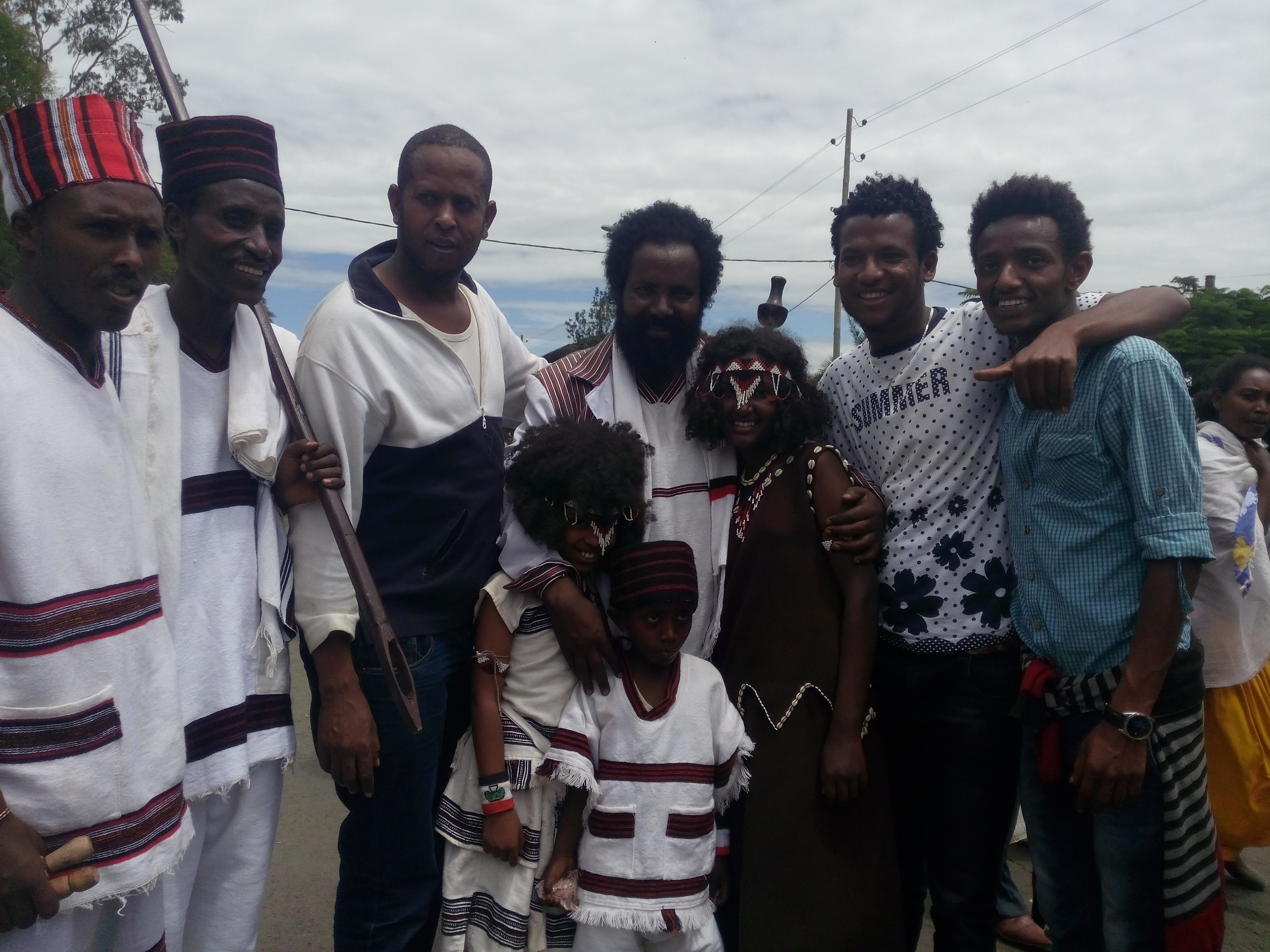
- Oromo people in folk costume at Irreechaa festival, 2015

Regions with significant populations
- Ethiopia: 25,489,000 (2007)
- Kenya: 739,839 (2019)
- Sudan: 105,000 (2022)
- Somalia: 41,600 (2000)
- United States: 23,519 (2023)
- Canada: 5,890 (2021)
- Australia: 4,310 (2021)

Languages
- Oromo

Religion
- Islam (~50-60%); Christianity (~40-45%); Waaqeffanna (~5%)

Related ethnic groups
- Afar • Agaw • Beja • Burji • Somali • Sidama • Hadiya • Rendille • Iraqw • Gedeo • Kambaata • Konso • other Cushitic peoples

The Oromo people (Oromo: Oromoo, pron. /ˈɒrəmoʊ/ ORR-əm-oh) are a Cushitic ethnic group who live in the Oromia region of Ethiopia and parts of northern Kenya. They speak the Oromo language (also called Afaan Oromoo), which is part of the Cushitic branch of the Afroasiatic language family.

They are one of the largest ethnic groups in Ethiopia. According to the last Ethiopian census of 2007, the Oromo numbered 25,488,344 people or 34.5% of the Ethiopian population. Recent estimates have the Oromo comprising 41,500,000 people, or 35.8% of the total Ethiopian population estimated at 116,000,000.

The Oromo were originally nomadic, pastoralist people who later would conquer large swaths of land during their expansions. After the settlement, they would establish kingdoms in the Gibe regions and assimilate the natives. The Oromo people traditionally used the gadaa system as the primary form of governance. A leader is elected by the gadaa system and their term lasts eight years, with an election taking place at the end of those eight years. Although most modern Oromos are Muslims or Christians, about 3% practice Waaqeffanna, the native ancient Cushitic monotheistic religion of Oromos.

== Origins and etymology ==
Historical linguistics and comparative ethnology studies suggest that the Oromo people probably originated around the lakes Lake Chew Bahir and Lake Chamo. They are a Cushitic people and prior to their expansions, they inhabited only the region of what is now modern-day north Kenya and southern Ethiopia. The aftermath of the sixteenth century Ethiopian–Adal war led Oromos to move to the north. While Oromo people have lived in the region for a long time, the ethnic mixture of peoples who have lived here is unclear. The Oromos increased their numbers through assimilation (Meedhicca, Mogasa and Gudifacha), as well as the inclusion of mixed peoples (Gabbaro). The native names of the territories were replaced by the name of the Oromo clans who settled on it while the indigenous people were assimilated.

According to Herbert S. Lewis, both the Oromo and the Somali people originated in southern Ethiopia but the Somali expanded to the east and north much earlier than the Oromo, and the Oromo lived only in southern Ethiopia and northern Kenya until the Oromo expansion began about 1530. Historical evidence suggests that the Oromo people were already established in the southern highlands in or before the 15th century and that at least some Oromo people were interacting with other Ethiopian ethnic groups. According to Alessandro Triulzi, the interactions and encounters between Oromos and Nilo-Saharan groups likely began very early.

Subsequent colonial-era travellers, geographers and official documents mention and refer to the Oromo people as Galla, which has now developed derogatory connotations, but these documents were generally written by members of other ethnic groups. The term Galla was in use for Oromo people by the Abyssinians, Arabs and Somalis. The original meaning of the term is heavily disputed. An outdated but popular theory among European historians during the 19th century regarding the origin of the term was the belief that it derives from the Hebrew (חלב) and Greek (Gála), milk, due to the outdated belief that the Oromos were lost white men. This name theory was especially popular among German historians who once believed that the Oromo were related to the ancient Gallic tribe in France. Another outdated theory of its origin comes from the belief that the Oromos rejected the offer to convert to Islam by Muhammad as their official religion, thus the prophet giving them the name Qal la or هو قال لا meaning "he said no". Some sources claim it was a term for a river and a forest, as well as for the pastoral people established in the highlands of southern Ethiopia. This historical information, according to Mohammed Hassen, is consistent with the written and oral traditions of the Somalis. Others, such as the International African Institute, suggests that it is an Oromo word (adopted by neighbors), for there is a word, gala, meaning 'wandering' or 'to go home' in their language. Canadian philosophical professor, Claude Sumner, stated that the French explorer and Ethiopian traveler, Antoine Thomson d'Abbadie, claimed that the term had derived from an Oromo war cry whilst the Oromos were fighting on battlefields. The word Oromo is derived from Ilm Orma meaning '[The] Children of Orma', or 'Sons of Men'. According to an alternative interpretation, 'Ilm Orma' translates to "son of a stranger."

In the Emirate of Harar, Oromo were historically known as the Argetta by the neighboring Harari people.

== History ==
The earliest recorded mention of the Oromos comes from the Italian (Venetian) cartographer Fra Mauro, who notes a Galla River south of the Awash River, in his famous Mappomondo, or map of the world, completed in 1460. The first detailed history of the Oromo people comes from the Ethiopian monk Bahrey who wrote Zenahu la Galla, or "History of the Galla" in 1593. They are also mentioned in the records left by Abba Paulos, Joao Bermudes, Jerónimo Lobo, Galawdewos, Sarsa Dengel and others. These records suggest that the Oromo were a pastoralist people who began to move in large numbers into the central highlands of Ethiopia from their cradleland in the plains of southern Ethiopia during the 16th century. A major factor of this movement was the militarization of the Gadaa system. All aspects of Oromo life was governed by the Gadaa system, a political and ritual system based on an egalitarian ethos, age grade social organization and highly structured institutions. Under Gadaa, every eight years, the Oromo would choose by consensus nine leaders known as Salgan ya’ii Borana (the nine Borana assemblies). A leader elected by the gadaa system remains in power only for 8 years, with an election taking place at the end of those 8 years. Whenever an Abbaa Gadaa dies while exercising his functions, the bokkuu (the symbol of power) passes to his wife and she keeps the bokkuu and proclaims the laws.

This large scale expansion is referred to as the "Great Oromo Migrations". Prior to this movement, the Oromos were divided into two major confederations, the Boorana and the Barento, who lived in the west and east of the Rift Valley respectively. The Barento moved in an eastern direction, eventually settling in today's Arsi, Bale, Hararghe and Wollo regions. Whereas the Boorana trekked northwest, settling in the regions of Shewa, Illubabor and Welega. According to Richard Pankhurst, a British-born Ethiopian historian, this expansion is linked to the attempted conquest of the Ethiopian Empire by Imam Ahmad ibn Ibrahim, which created a political and military vacuum that allowed the Oromo to move relatively unhindered into both the Ethiopian Empire and the Adal Sultanate. Further, they acquired horses and their gada system helped coordinate Oromo cavalry warriors which enabled them to fight very effectively. Bahrey argues the success of the Oromos in battle was because all Oromo men were trained as warriors, while in Ethiopia only a small section of the population were warriors, the rest uninvolved in the defense of their country. The military discipline of the Oromos was noted in the memoirs of the self-proclaimed Patriarch of Ethiopia, João Bermudes, who observed that during the invasion of Dawaro, the Oromos "did not come on without order like barbarians, but advanced collected in bodies, like squadrons."

The early 16th and 17th century witnessed the gradual integration of the Oromo into the Ethiopian Empire. Emperor Susenyos I, who came to power with Oromo support, did much to integrate them into the political establishment of the Christian state. Having grown up among the Oromo, he was fluent in their language and admired their way of life. He employed Oromo warriors, military tactics and combat formations against his rivals for the throne. Once in power, he filled high level offices with his Oromo supporters and settled various Oromo groups throughout much of Gojjam and Begemder. Under Susenyos's successors, many Oromos would continue to rise to positions of prominence in imperial service, and for a period even change the official language of the empire from Amharic to Oromiffa during the rule of the half-Oromo emperor Iyoas I. They would establish dynasties such as the Yejju dynasty that would be de facto rulers of Ethiopian Empire from 1784 to 1853 during the Zemene Mesafint, they would particularly have control over the provinces of Begemder and Gojjam. Another Oromo dynasty that would rise in the northern Ethiopian highlands was the Islamic Warra Himano (1580–1916), which transformed Wollo into a veritable Islamic state in the heartland of Christian Ethiopia. The Warra Himano would convert many Amhara Christians to Islam during its rule, and at the zenith of its power, the Warra Himano had their hegemony accepted in the various parts of Wollo: Ambasel, Qallu, Borena, Wore-Illu and Amhara Sayint. Notable rulers such as Ras Mikael of Wollo and the uncrowned emperor of Ethiopia, Lij Iyasu (1913–1916), descend from this ruling family.

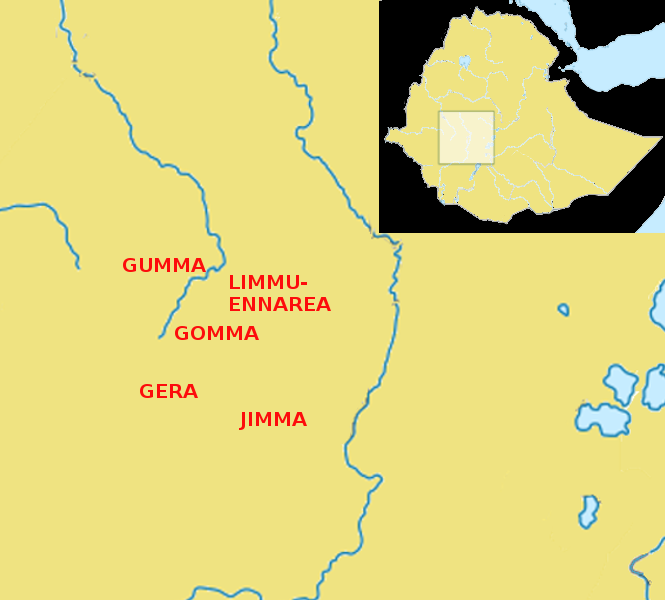
Map showing the location of the five Oromo kingdoms in the Gibe region.

In the late 16th century the Oromos had settled in the territories south of the Abay river in western Ethiopia. Within 60 years of their arrival, five Oromo states would emerge in the Gibe region, such as Gera, Gomma, Gumma, Jimma and Limmu-Ennarea. These states arose through the transformation of pastoralism to agriculture due to the fertile and adequately watered land of the region. This increased the importance of agriculture and led to the subsequent rise of a land owning class. The rich natural environment produced commodities that were in high demand and lead to the rise of a strong merchant class. These changes allowed the gadaa officials to acquire more authority and convert their elective offices into permanent monarchical institutions. In the eastern part of the country, especially in Arsi, Bale and Hararghe, the Oromo had remained predominantly pastoralists until the late 19th century. Only the Oromo who lived within the immediate periphery of the city of Harar adopted agriculture as their primary occupation, these Oromo were employed by Harari landlords. According to oral and literary evidence, certain Somali and Oromo clans fought each other throughout the sixteenth, seventeenth and eighteenth centuries, particularly near their eastern borders.

The French traveler, Charles-Xavier Rochet d'Héricourt, visited Ethiopia in 1863, and was greeted by Sahle Selassie, the ruler of Shewa. During his time there, he observed the different ethnicities within Ethiopia, one of which were the Oromo people. He described them as such:

"[The] Galla breed is the most beautiful in Africa; it is not originally from Abyssinia; she came there by invasion, as we will see below in the history that I will give of the Kingdom of Choa (Shewa). The Gallas are, in general, well built, they have a tall figure, a broad and raised forehead, an aquiline nose, a well-cut mouth, a copper complexion rather than black; their hair is braided into small braids which float around their heads, and mix something graceful with the expressive and noble character of their physiognomy: accustomed, from their most tender youth, to ride horses, to carry the butcher and the spear, they are excellent horsemen and insensitive to the harshest fatigue; full of courage and valor in combat, they showed themselves, in their fields, skillful and laborious farmers: this great nation, because we can call it that could led by an enterprising leader, make itself master of the whole of Africa."

In the last quarter of the 19th century, the Oromo tribes and kingdoms fell under the rule of Menelik II of Shewa. Beginning in the 1870s, the Kingdom of Shewa annexed one Oromo territory after the other with unpreceded speed owing to the modern weapons acquired from the international arms trade and the disunity among various Oromo groups. The manner this conquest was carried out determined the form of administrations that was subsequently set up in the newly conquered areas. In areas where the Shewans encountered resistance, such as Arsi, the conquering generals were installed as governors and the Amhara soldiers or neftenya settled the region in military garrisons known as katamas which later become the administrative centers for Shewan rule. These officials and soldier-settlers lived off the land of the locals, who soon became serfs to the Shewan aristocrats. In the areas were the Oromos submitted peacefully, such as the Kingdom of Jimma, the indigenous rulers were made tributaries to the crown but were allowed to self-govern themselves with minimal interference from the central government. During Haile Selassie's rule, many Oromos lost their autonomous status granted to them by Menelik, Haile Selassie abolished the semi-independent status of many Oromo states and began to undergo a period of centralization. Pastoralists were evicted to make way for mechanized farming and the few members of the educated Oromo class were prevented from holding powerful positions, instead being held by assimilated or Amharized Oromo notables. Despite the great contribution of the Oromo regions to the Ethiopian economy, Oromos areas were left out of the modernization projects during the reign of Haile Selassie.

This discontent emanating from the political marginalization, economic exploitation and the cultural domination of the Oromo led to the rise of the Mecha and Tulama Self-Help Association in 1963, ostensibly for organizing Oromo self-help, but in fact to promote Oromo identity and fight the marginalization of the Oromo. The Mecha and Tulama Association was soon disbanded by the government, but its impact was significant. The movement raised the consciousness of the Oromo regarding the significance of their own cultural and historical contributions and their status as a people within the Ethiopian state.

== Demographics ==
The Oromos are the largest ethnic group in Ethiopia (35.8% of the population), numbering around 40 million. They are predominantly concentrated in the Oromia Region in central Ethiopia, the largest region in the country by both population and area. They speak Afaan Oromoo, the official language of Oromia. Oromos constitute the third most populous ethnic group among Africans as a whole and the most populous among Horners specifically.

Oromo also have a notable presence in northern Kenya in the Marsabit County, Isiolo County and Tana River County totaling to about 656,636: 276,236 Borana, 141,200 Gabra, 158,000 Orma, 45,200 Sakuye, 20,000 Waata, and 16,000 Munyo Yaya. There are also Oromo in the former Wollo and Tigray provinces of Ethiopia.

=== Subgroups ===
The Oromo consist of two major branches that break down into an assortment of clan families. From west to east: the Borana Oromo, also called the Booranaa, are a semi-pastoralist group living in southern Oromia and northern Kenya. The Borana inhabit the Borena Zone of the Oromia Region of Ethiopia and the former Northern Frontier District (now northern Kenya) of Northern Kenya. They speak a dialect of Afaan Oromo, the Oromo language. Barentu/Barentoo or (older) Baraytuma is the other moiety of the Oromo people. The Barentu Oromo inhabit the eastern parts of the Oromia Region in the Zones of West Hararghe, Arsi Zone, Bale Zone, Dire Dawa city, the Jijiga Zone of the Somali Region, Administrative Zone 3 of the Afar Region, Oromia Zone of the Amhara Region, and are also found in the Raya Azebo Aanaas in the Tigray Region.

== Language ==
The Oromo language is written with Latin characters known as Qubee. The Sapalo script was invented by the Oromo scholar Sheikh Bakri Sapalo (also known by his birth name, Abubaker Usman Odaa) during the 1950s. Oromo serves as one of the official languages of Ethiopia and is also the working language of several of the states within the Ethiopian federal system including Oromia, Harari and Dire Dawa regional states and of the Oromia Zone in the Amhara Region. It is a language of primary education in Oromia, Harari, Dire Dawa, Benishangul-Gumuz and of the Oromia Zone in the Amhara Region. It is used as an internet language for federal websites along with Tigrinya.

More than 35% of Ethiopia's population are Oromo mother-tongue speakers, which makes it the most widely spoken primary language in Ethiopia. It is also the most widely spoken Cushitic language and the fourth-most widely spoken language of Africa, after Arabic, Hausa and Swahili. Oromo is spoken as a first language by more than 40 million Oromo people in Ethiopia and by an additional half-million in parts of northern and eastern Kenya. It is also spoken by smaller numbers of emigrants in other African countries, such as South Africa, Libya, Egypt and Sudan. Besides first language speakers, a number of members of other ethnicities who are in contact with the Oromo speak it as a second language, such as the Omotic-speaking Bambassi and the Nilo-Saharan-speaking Kwama in western Ethiopia.

== Religion ==
The Oromo followed their traditional religion, Waaqeffanna, and were resistant to religious conversion before assimilation in sultanates and Christian kingdoms. The influential 30-year war from 1529 to 1559 between the three parties – the Waaqeffanna, the Christians and the Muslims – dissipated the political strengths of all three. The religious beliefs of the Oromo people evolved in this socio-political environment. In the 19th century and first half of the 20th century, Protestant or Catholic missionaries' efforts spread Christianity among the Oromo. Organizations included the Sudan Interior Mission, the Bible Churchmen's Missionary Society, the Seventh-Day Adventists, the United Presbyterian Mission of the US, the Church Mission to the Jews, Evangeliska Fosterlands-Stiftelsen, Bibeltrogna Vänner, and the Hermannsburg Mission.

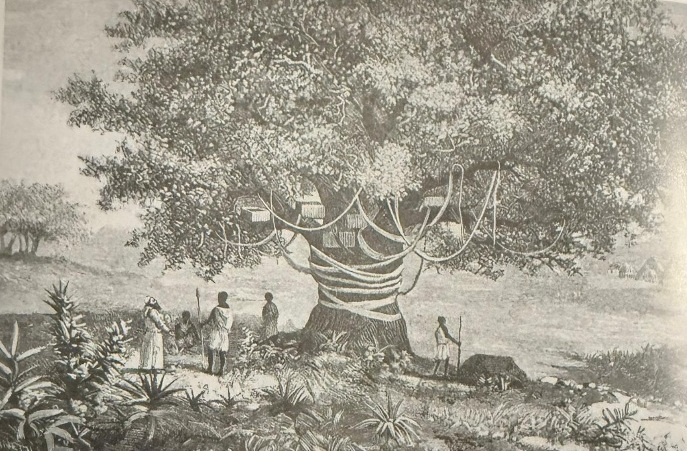
Illustration of Oromo tree veneration ceremony by Guglielmo Massaia in the nineteenth century

In the mid and late 19th century, the Ethiopian emperors were faced with widespread rifts and disputes in the Ethiopian Orthodox Tewahedo Church and crippling ethnic and religious divisions that plagued the empire and exposed it to the intervention and meddling of neighboring Muslims (especially Egypt and the Ottoman Empire) and European powers. The emperors that ruled in that period, Tewodros II, Yohannes IV, and Menelik II, thus strove to suppress disunion and schism both within and without the Ethiopian Church and were often intolerant towards other religions. The Wollo Oromo, the Arsi Oromo, and the Tulama Oromo were among those who violently clashed with the Ethiopian expansion in the region in the 19th century and the empire's attempts at enforcing unity through the propagation of Orthodox Christianity, as the majority of these groups were not Christian but Muslims.

In the 2007 Ethiopian census for Oromia region, which included Oromo and some non-Oromo residents, there was a total of 13,107,963 followers of Christianity (8,204,908 Orthodox, 4,780,917 Protestant, 122,138 Catholic), 12,835,410 followers of Islam, 887,773 followers of traditional religions, and 162,787 followers of other religions. Accordingly, the Oromia region is approximately 50.2% Christian (8,204,908 or 30.4% Orthodox, 4,780,917 or 17.7% Protestant, 122,138 Catholic), 49.2% Muslim and 0.6% followers of other religions.

According to a 2016 estimate by James Minahan, about half of the Oromo people are Sunni Muslim, a third are Ethiopian Orthodox, and the rest are mostly Protestants or follow their traditional religious beliefs. The traditional religion is more common in southern Oromo populations and Christianity more common in and near the urban centers, while Islam is more common near the Somali border and in the north.

== Cuisine ==
=== Oromo dishes ===
Authentic Oromo staple foods are primarily centered on dairy and meat, reflecting a deep pastoralist heritage. Pork is typically not in Oromo cuisine, as it is considered taboo for Orthodox Oromos and Muslim Oromos who make up over 90% of the population combined, unlike with Catholics among others.

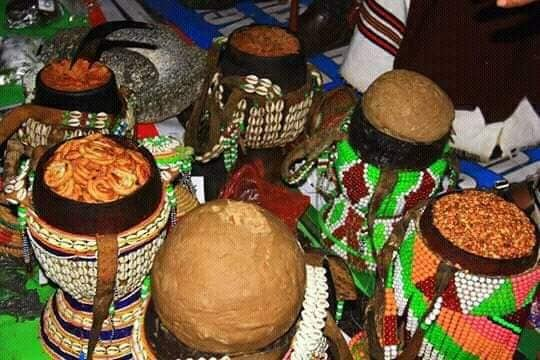
Typical Oromo cuisine

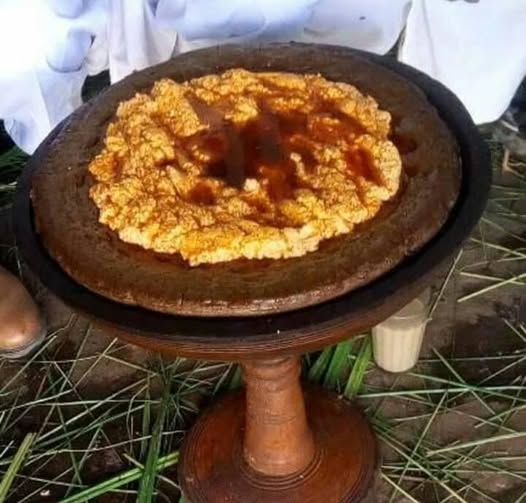
Oromo Cultural Food

- Foon Akaawwii – Minced roasted meat; specially seasoned.
- Waaddii – Outdoor grilled meat on heat bead or wood fire.
- Anchotte – A common dish in the western part of Oromia (Wallaga), made from a tuber crop rich in starch.
- Baduu – Liquid remaining after milk has been curdled and strained (cheese)
- Maarqaa – Porridge made from wheat, honey, milk, chili and spices.
- Chechebsaa – pieces of flat, thin bread stir-fried with chili powder and cheese.
- Qoocco – Also known as kocho, it is not the Gurage type of kocho but a different kind; a common dish in the western part of Oromia.
- Itto – Comprises all sorts of vegetables (tomato, potato, ginger, garlic), meat (lamb)
- Chukkoo – Also known as Micira; a sweet flavor of whole grain, seasoned with butter and spices.
- Chororsaa – A spiced mixture of cheeses, butter, and yogurt, topped on a bread made from black teff known as 'Chumboo'. A common dish in western parts of Oromia such as Welega Province, typically used in weddings or other celebrations.
- Ukkaamssa (Affaanyii) – Stewed ground beef with spices, minced onion, garlic, green chili pepper, and butter.
- Dokkee – A common dish throughout Oromia state
- Laaffisoo – type of food, i.e. 'buddeenaa' soaked in stew.
- Hojjaa – A tea-like drink made from coffee husks and milk.
- Quxxii – A tea-like drink made from coffee leaves.
- Affeellama – Porridge made from wheat, honey, milk, corn, coarsely ground grain barley
- Qince – Similar to Maarqaa but made from shredded grains as opposed to flour.
- Qorso (Akaayii) – A snack made by roasting barley seeds
- Dadhii – A drink made from honey.
- Farsho – Beer-like Beverage, made from barley.
- Buna – Ethiopian Coffee

== Culture ==
=== Gadaa ===
Gadaa flag

Oromo people have governed themselves in accordance with the Gadaa system long before the 16th century. The system regulates the political, economic, social and religious activities of the community. Oromo were traditionally a culturally homogeneous society with genealogical ties. A male born in the Oromo clan went through five stages of eight years, where his life established his role and status for consideration to a Gadaa office. Every eight years, the Oromo would choose by consensus nine leaders for the office. A leader elected by the Gadaa system remains in power only for eight years, with an election taking place at the end of those eight years.

There are three Gadaa organs of governance: Gadaa Council, Gadaa General Assembly (gumi gayo), and the Qallu Assembly. The Gadaa Council is considered the collective achievement of the members of the Gadaa class. It is responsible for coordinating irreecha. The Gadaa General Assembly is the legislative body of the Gadaa government, while the Qallu Assembly is the religious institution.

=== Calendar ===
The Oromo people developed a lunisolar calendar; different geographically and religiously distinct Oromo communities use the same calendar. This calendar is sophisticated and similar to ones found among the Chinese, the Hindus and the Mayans. It was tied to the traditional religion of the Oromos, and used to schedule the Gadaa system of elections and power transfer.

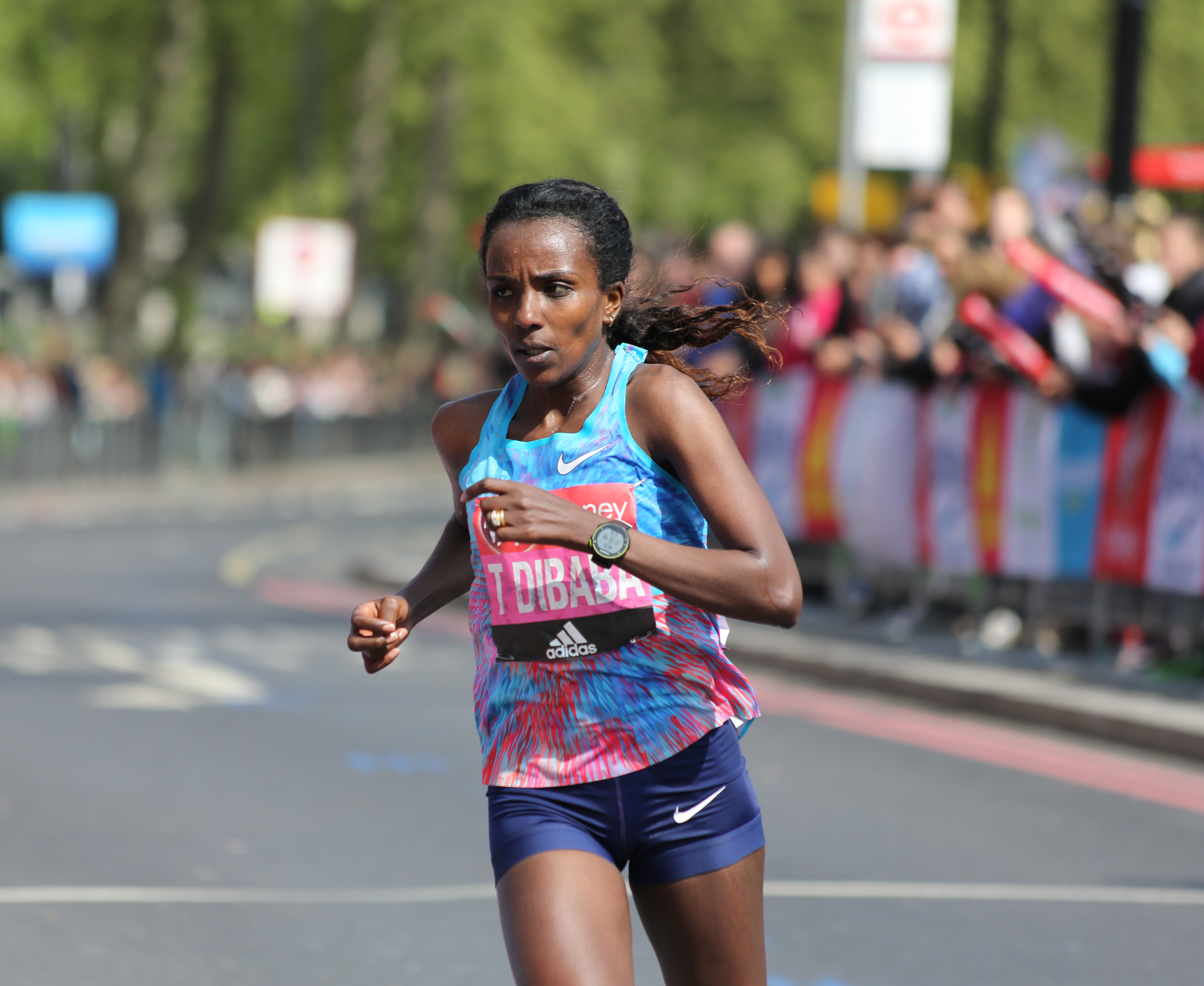
Previous 5000 m world record holder Tirunesh Dibaba of Ethiopia running the London marathon

The Borana Oromo calendar system was once thought to be based upon an earlier Cushitic calendar developed around 300 BC found at Namoratunga. Reconsideration of the Namoratunga site led astronomer and archaeologist Clive Ruggles to conclude that there is no relationship. The new year of the Oromo people, according to this calendar, falls in the month of October. The calendar has no weeks but a name for each day of the month. It is a lunar-stellar calendar system.

=== Oromumma ===
Some modern authors such as Gemetchu Megerssa have proposed the concept of Oromumma, or 'Oromoness' as a cultural common between Oromo people. The word is derived by combining Oromo with the Arabic term ummah (community). However, according to Terje Østebø and other scholars, this term is a neologism from the late 1990s and its link Oromo ethno-nationalism and Salafi Islamic discourse has been questioned, in their disagreement with Christian Amhara and other ethnic groups.

The Oromo people, depending on their geographical location and historical events, have variously converted to Islam, to Christianity, or remained with their traditional religion (Waaqeffanna). According to Gemetchu Megerssa, the subjective reality is that "neither traditional Oromo rituals nor traditional Oromo beliefs function any longer as a cohesive and integral symbol system" for the Oromo people, not just regionally but even locally. The cultural and ideological divergence within the Oromo people, in part from their religious differences, is apparent from the constant impetus for negotiations between broader Oromo spokespersons and those Oromo who are Ahl al-Sunna followers, states Terje Østebø. The internally evolving cultural differences within the Oromos have led some scholars such as Mario Aguilar and Abdullahi Shongolo to conclude that "a common identity acknowledged by all Oromo in general does not exist".

== Clothing & Hairstyle ==
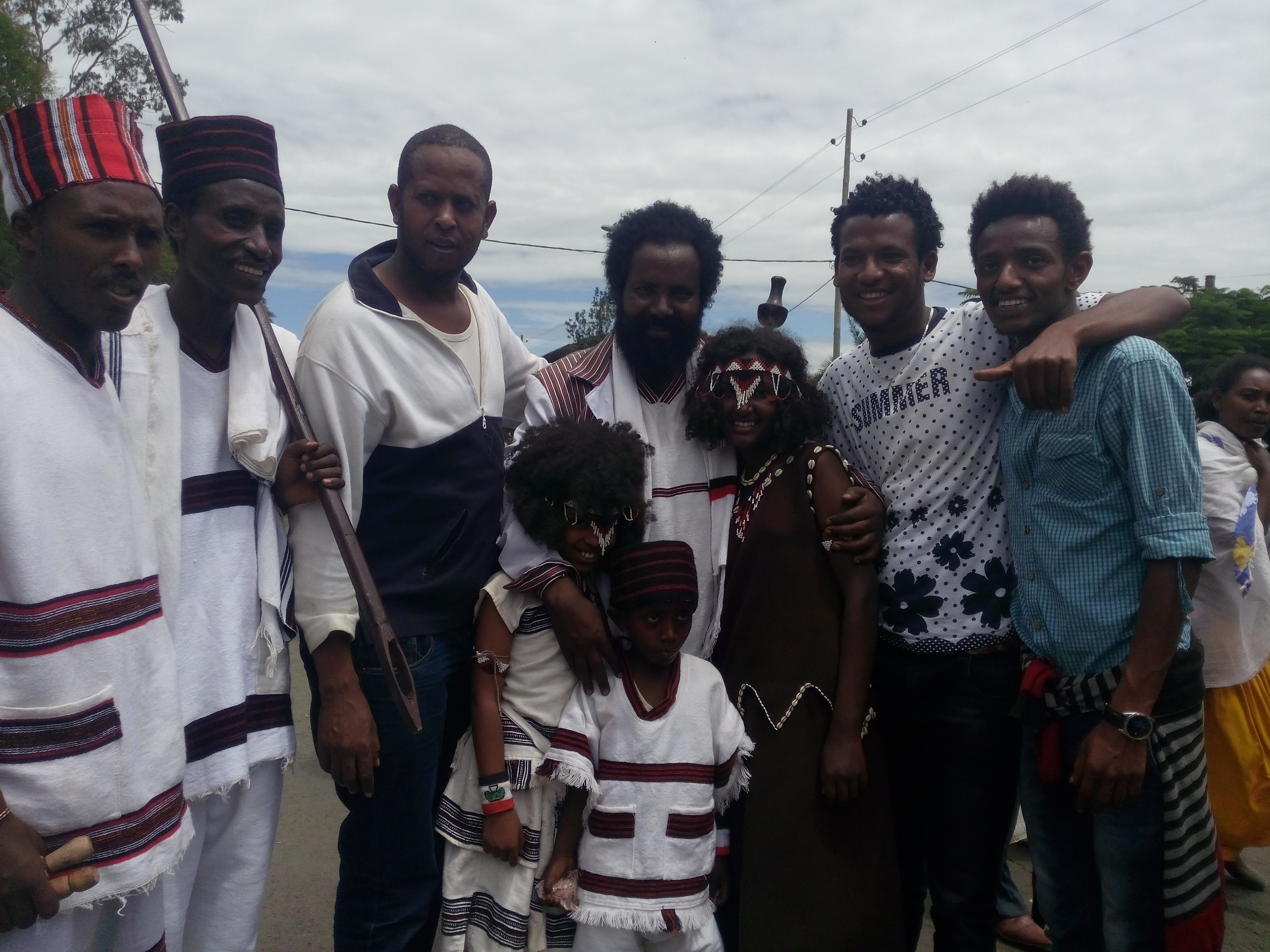
Oromo people in folk costume at Irreechaa festival, 2015

=== Clothing ===
Oromo attire is characterized by its deep connection to pastoral roots and the symbolic use of specific colors linked to the Gadaa system. Oromo attire is fundamentally made from softened cowhide and leather. Across the territory from the forests of Illubabor to the arid plains of Borana, the primary garment is the Wandabo, a wrap-around skirt or dress made from meticulously softened cowhide or goatskin.

==== Primary Materials ====
Cowhide (Gogaa Loonii)

Cowhide is the fundamental material. It is used for the Wandabo (the Wrap-around skirt). The thickness of the cowhide provides protection against thorny acacia landscape. it is often scraped thin enough to be pliable but remains heavy enough to provide a distinct, structured silhouette.

Goat and Sheep Skin (Haduu / Gogaa Reeye)

These are used for more intimate or flexible garments. Women often wear softened goat-skin capes or undergarments. These are frequently treated with butter or oils, which act as both a preservative for the leather and a cosmetic for the skin.

Wild Animal Skins (Gogaa Bineensaa)

Skins of the colobus monkey or leopard were strictly reserved for the Luba (those in the ruling age-grade of the Gadaa system) or for renowned warriors.

===== Specific Terminology =====
Wandabo: A wrap-around skirt reaching the knees, often the primary garment for women. The material used is heavily worked cowhide.

Gorfoo / Sadetta: A leather dress made from tanned cowhide or goatskin.

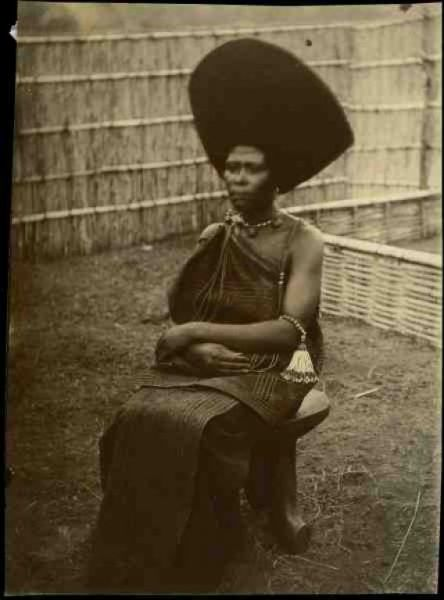
Oromo woman from Jiren, Jimma (1885), wearing a qollo and a wandabo.

Qollo: A skin or leather cloak worn over the shoulders worn by women. Goat or calfskin is used to make it.

Siraa: A layered leather wrap worn by men. It is made from durable cowhide.

Gurda: A scared leather string or thin belt tied around the waist. It is made from twisted hide or gut and is worn by women. It is the most decorated part of the outfit. It is heavily encrusted with white and colored beads. These beaded belts cinch leather skirts and produce a rhythmic clicking sound as the women walked. It is also used to hold tools, amulets, or simply to signify the woman's status, with specific bead patterns indicating clan affiliation and family wealth.

===== Preparation =====
The preparation of leather clothing follows long-established Oromo techniques:

1. Fresh hides are craped clean and stretched in the sun
2. The hide is softened with butter, animal fat, or plant oils to prevent cracking and giving the leather a smooth, pliable texture.
3. Women rub and fold the hide repeatedly over several days to achieve softness.
4. Some hides are smoked to improve durability and impart a warm brown tone.
5. Decorative elements such as beads or cowries are sewn onto the leather using fiber cords.
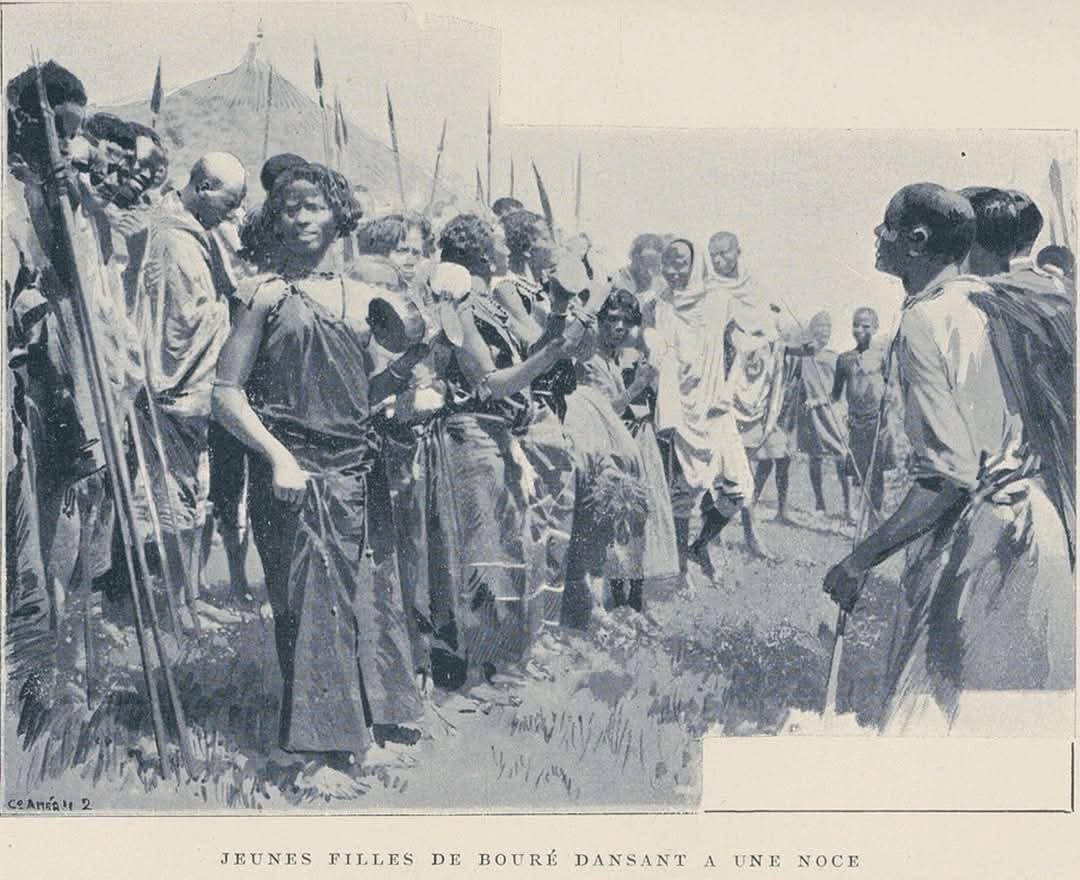
  Young Oromo girls of Boure, Illubabor dancing at a wedding

While the base material remains leather, the styling reflects the diverse environments. In the west, leather garments are often heavier and more enclosed for warmth, whereas in the south among the Borana and Guji, they are worn as lighter, elegant wraps that allow for better airflow. These leather garments are universally elevated through symbolic ornamentation. They are frequently fringed or inlaid with cowrie shells and intricate beadwork to signal a woman's marital status or her family's wealth. For men, heavy hide capes and specialized belts are used that denote one's specific rank or grade within the Gadas system. However, many Oromos today wear modern European clothes for daily life.

=== Hairstyle ===
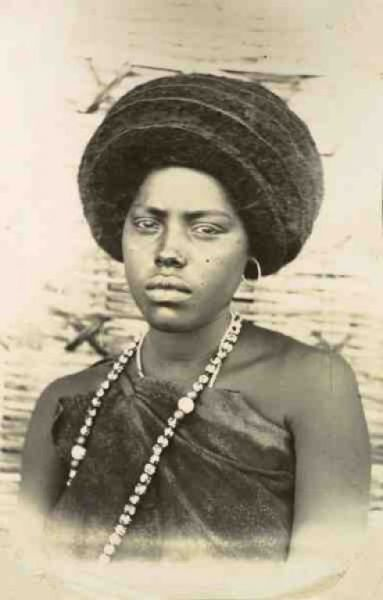
Oromo woman from Jiren, Jimma (1880s).

Hairstyle forms a central component of Oromo women's cultural expression. The most prominent ones are the strikingly large, rounded coiffures of the Jimma Oromo. They are rounded, halo-like frames that extend outward in a smooth, circular silhouette. Plant fibers are woven into the coiffures to create internal support, allowing the coiffures to stand without collapsing. These coiffures reflect age, marital status, and social identity.

=== Jewelry ===
In Oromo culture, jewelry serves as a social and symbolic marker primarily utilizing beads and cowrie shells to denote status, age-set, and marital rights. These materials are also integrated into both leather garments and ceremonial accessories across various sub-groups.

Headpieces are among the most significant markers of identity. Beaded headbands are worn by women with different patterns and bead counts that often signal marital status or regional affiliation. In Guji, women wear the Hirpha, a delicate beaded ornament that rests on the forehead. For men, the Kallacha, a phallic-shaped wood or metallic ornament is worn on the forehead by elders and Abba Gadaas.

Necklaces are also worn in layers and carry deep symbolic meaning. Women often wear multiple strands of heavy glass or clay beads; the specific arrangement can denote the number of children they have or their family's wealth.

=== Social Stratification ===
Oromo people regionally developed social stratification consisting of four hierarchical strata. The highest strata were the nobles called the Borana; below them were the Gabbaro (some 17th- to 19th-century Ethiopian texts refer them as the dhalatta). Below these two upper castes were the despised castes of artisans, and at the lowest level were the slaves.

In the Islamic Kingdom of Jimma, the Oromo society's caste strata predominantly consisted of endogamous, inherited artisanal occupations. Each caste group has specialized in a particular occupation such as iron working, carpentry, weapon making, pottery, weaving, leather-working and hunting.

Each caste in the Oromo society had a designated name. For example, Tumtu were smiths, Fuga were potters, Faqi were tanners and leatherworkers, Semmano were weavers, Gagurtu were beekeepers and honey-makers, and Watta were hunters and foragers. While slaves were a stratum within the society, many Oromos, regardless of caste, were sold into slavery elsewhere. By the 19th century, Oromo slaves were sought after and a major part of slaves sold in Gondar and Gallabat slave markets at Ethiopia-Sudan border, as well as the Massawa and Tajura markets on the Red Sea. There was also a large slave market at al Hudaydah on the coast of Yemen.

== Livelihood ==
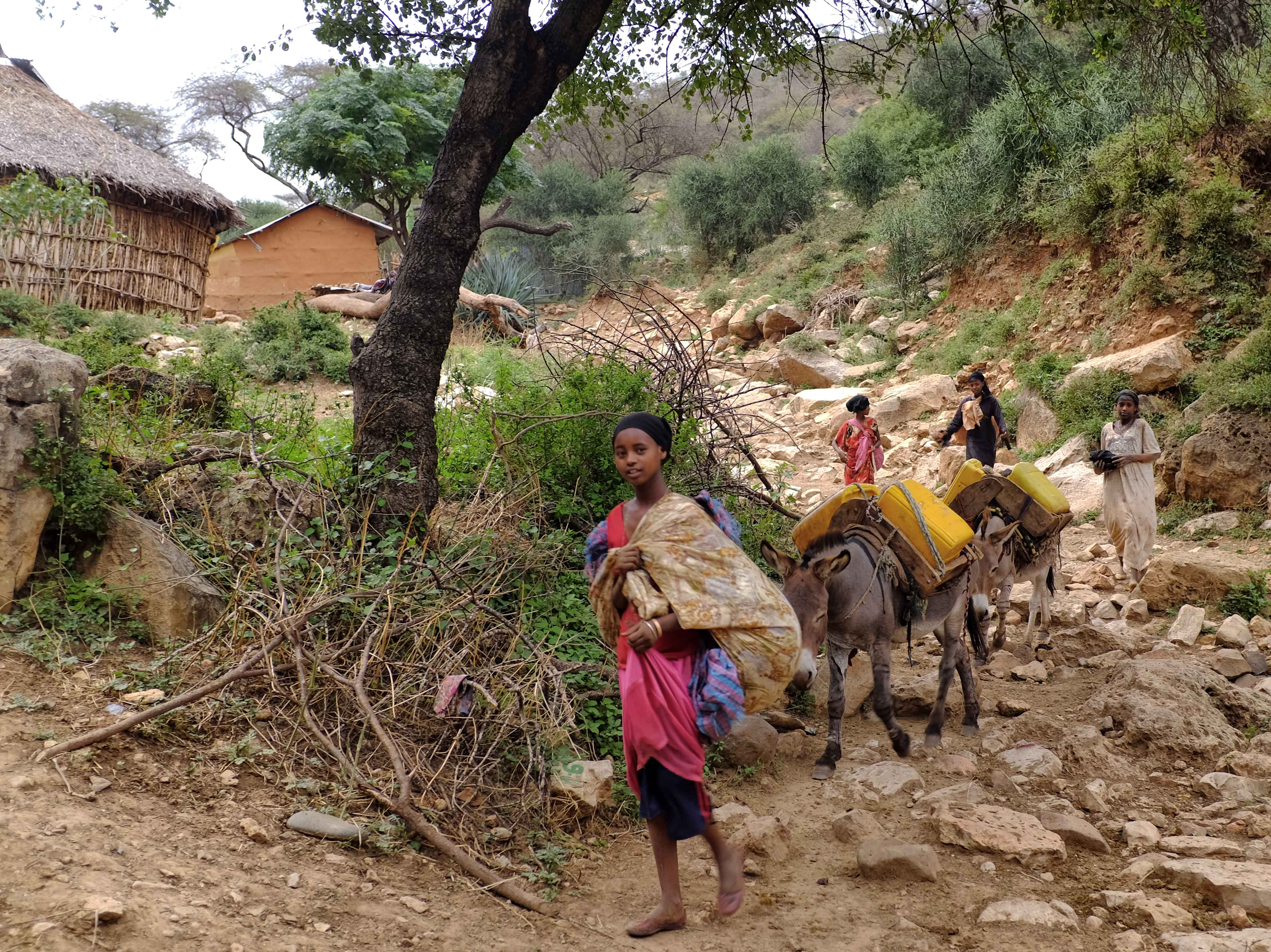
Oromo villagers in the Oromia Region

The Oromo people are engaged in many occupations. The southern Oromo (specifically the Borana Oromo) are largely pastoralists who raise goats and cattle. Other Oromo groups have a more diverse economy which includes agriculture and work in urban centers. Some Oromo also sell many products and food items like coffee beans (coffee being a favorite beverage among the Oromo) at local markets.

== Contemporary era ==
=== Human rights issues ===
In December 2009, a 96-page report titled "Human Rights in Ethiopia: Through the Eyes of the Oromo Diaspora", compiled by the Advocates for Human Rights, documented human rights violations against the Oromo in Ethiopia under three successive regimes: the Ethiopian Empire under Haile Selassie, Marxist Derg and the Ethiopian People's Revolutionary Democratic Front (EPRDF), dominated by members of the Tigrayan People's Liberation Front (TPLF) and which was accused to have arrested approximately 20,000 suspected OLF members, to have driven most OLF leadership into exile, and to have effectively neutralized the OLF as a political force in Ethiopia.

According to the Office of the United Nations High Commissioner for Human Rights, the Oromia Support Group (OSG) recorded 594 extrajudicial killings of Oromos by Ethiopian government security forces and 43 disappearances in custody between 2005 and August 2008.

Starting in November 2015, during a wave of mass protests, mainly by Oromos, over the expansion of the municipal boundary of the city of Addis Ababa into Oromia, over 500 people have been killed and many more have been injured, according to human-rights advocates and independent monitors. The protests have since spread to other ethnic groups and encompass wider social grievances. Ethiopia declared a state of emergency in response to Oromo and Amhara protests in October 2016.

With the rising political unrest, there was ethnic violence involving the Oromo such as the Oromo–Somali clashes between the Oromo and the ethnic Somalis, leading to up to 400,000 displaced in 2017. Gedeo–Oromo clashes between the Oromo and the Gedeo people in the south of the country and continued violence in the Oromia-Somali border region led to Ethiopia having the largest number of people in the world fleeing their homes in 2018, with 1.4 million newly displaced people. In September 2018, in the minority protest that took place in Oromia near Addis Ababa, 23 people were killed following the deaths of 43 Oromos in the Addis Ababa neighborhood of Saris Abo. Some have blamed the rise in ethnic violence in the Oromia Special Zone Surrounding Finfinne on the Prime Minister Abiy Ahmed for giving space to groups formerly banned by previous Tigrayan-led governments, such as the Oromo Liberation Front and Ginbot 7.

Protests broke out across Ethiopia, chiefly in the Oromia region, following the assassination of musician Hachalu Hundessa on 29 June 2020, leading to the deaths of at least 200 people. On 30 June 2020, a statue of former Ethiopian emperor Haile Selassie in London was destroyed by Oromo protestors in response to the killing of popular singer Hachalu Hundessa and grievances of the Oromo language being banned from education, and the use in administration under the Haile Selassie regime.

=== Political organizations ===
The Oromo have played a major role in the internal dynamics of Ethiopia. Accordingly, Oromos played major roles in all three main political movements in Ethiopia (centralist, federalist and secessionist) during the 19th and 20th century. In addition to holding high powers during the centralist government and the monarchy, the Raya Oromos in the Tigray regional state played a major role in the Weyane revolt, challenging Emperor Haile Selassie I 's rule in the 1940s. Simultaneously, both federalist and secessionist political forces developed inside the Oromo community.

At present a number of ethnic-based political organizations have been formed to promote the interests of the Oromo. The first was the Mecha and Tulama Self-Help Association was founded in January 1963, but was disbanded by the government after several increasingly tense confrontations in November 1966. Later groups include the Oromo Liberation Front (OLF), Oromo Federalist Democratic Movement (OFDM), the United Liberation Forces of Oromia (ULFO), the Islamic Front for the Liberation of Oromia (IFLO), the Oromia Liberation Council (OLC), the Oromo National Congress (ONC, recently changed to OPC) and others. Another group, the Oromo People's Democratic Organization (OPDO), is one of the four parties that form the ruling Ethiopian People's Revolutionary Democratic Front (EPRDF) coalition. The ONC, for example, was part of the United Ethiopian Democratic Forces coalition that challenged the EPRDF in the Ethiopian general elections of 2005.

Several of these groups seek to create an independent Oromo nation, some using armed force. Meanwhile, the ruling OPDO and several opposition political parties in the Ethiopian parliament believe in ethnic federalism. However, most Oromo opposition parties in Ethiopia condemn the economic and political inequalities in the country. Progress toward independence started in the 1960s and 70s, but progress has been slow aside from the creation of Oromo-focused banks, notably the Oromo-owned Awash International Bank in 1994 and the Oromia Bank (formerly Oromia National Bank) established in 2008.

Flag of the Oromo Liberation Front and the Oromo Liberation Army, respectively the OLF and OLA.

Radio broadcasts began in the Oromo language in Somalia in 1960 on Radio Mogadishu. Within Kenya there has been radio broadcasting in Oromo (in the Borana dialect) on the Voice of Kenya since at least the 1980s. Broadcasting in Oromo began in Ethiopia during the 1974 revolution, in which Radio Harar began broadcasting. The first private Afaan Oromoo newspaper in Ethiopia, Jimma Times, also known as Oromo: Yeroo, was recently established, but it has faced a lot of harassment and persecution from the Ethiopian government since its beginning. Abuse of Oromo media is widespread in Ethiopia and reflective of the general oppression Oromos face in the country.

Various human rights organizations have publicized the government persecution of Oromos in Ethiopia for decades. In 2008, the OFDM opposition party condemned the government's indirect role in the death of hundreds of Oromos in western Ethiopia. According to Amnesty International, "between 2011 and 2014, at least 5000 Oromos have been arrested based on their actual or suspected peaceful opposition to the government. These include thousands of peaceful protestors and hundreds of opposition political party members. The government anticipates a high level of opposition in Oromia, and signs of dissent are sought out and regularly, sometimes pre-emptively, suppressed. In numerous cases, actual or suspected dissenters have been detained without charge or trial, killed by security services during protests, arrests and in detention."

According to Amnesty International, there is a sweeping repression in the Oromo region of Ethiopia. On 12 December 2015, the German broadcaster Deutsche Welle reported violent protests in the Oromo region of Ethiopia in which more than 20 students were killed. According to the report, the students were protesting against the government's re-zoning plan named 'Addis Ababa Master Plan'.

On 2 October 2016, between 55 and 300 festival-goers were massacred at the most sacred and largest event among the Oromo, the Irreechaa cultural thanksgiving festival. In one day, dozens were killed and many injured. Every year, millions of Oromos gather in Bishoftu for this annual celebration. That year Ethiopian security forces responded to peaceful protests by firing tear gas and live bullets at over two million people surrounded by a lake and cliffs. In the week that followed, angry youth attacked government buildings and private businesses. On 8 October, the government responded with an abusive and far-reaching state of emergency, which was lifted in August 2017. During the state of emergency, security forces arbitrarily detained over 21,000 people.

== See also ==
- Afroasiatic languages
- Barentu (Oromo)
- Borana people
- Ethiopians
- Gadaa
- Holawaka
- Irreechaa
- List of ethnic groups in Ethiopia
- List of Oromo subgroups and clans
- Oromia
- Oromia Zone
- Oromo language
