= Konzo people =

Konzo people may refer to:

- Konso people, an ethnic group in south-central Ethiopia
- Konjo people, a people found in the Rwenzori Mountains of Uganda
