= Waga sculpture =

Wooden sculpture

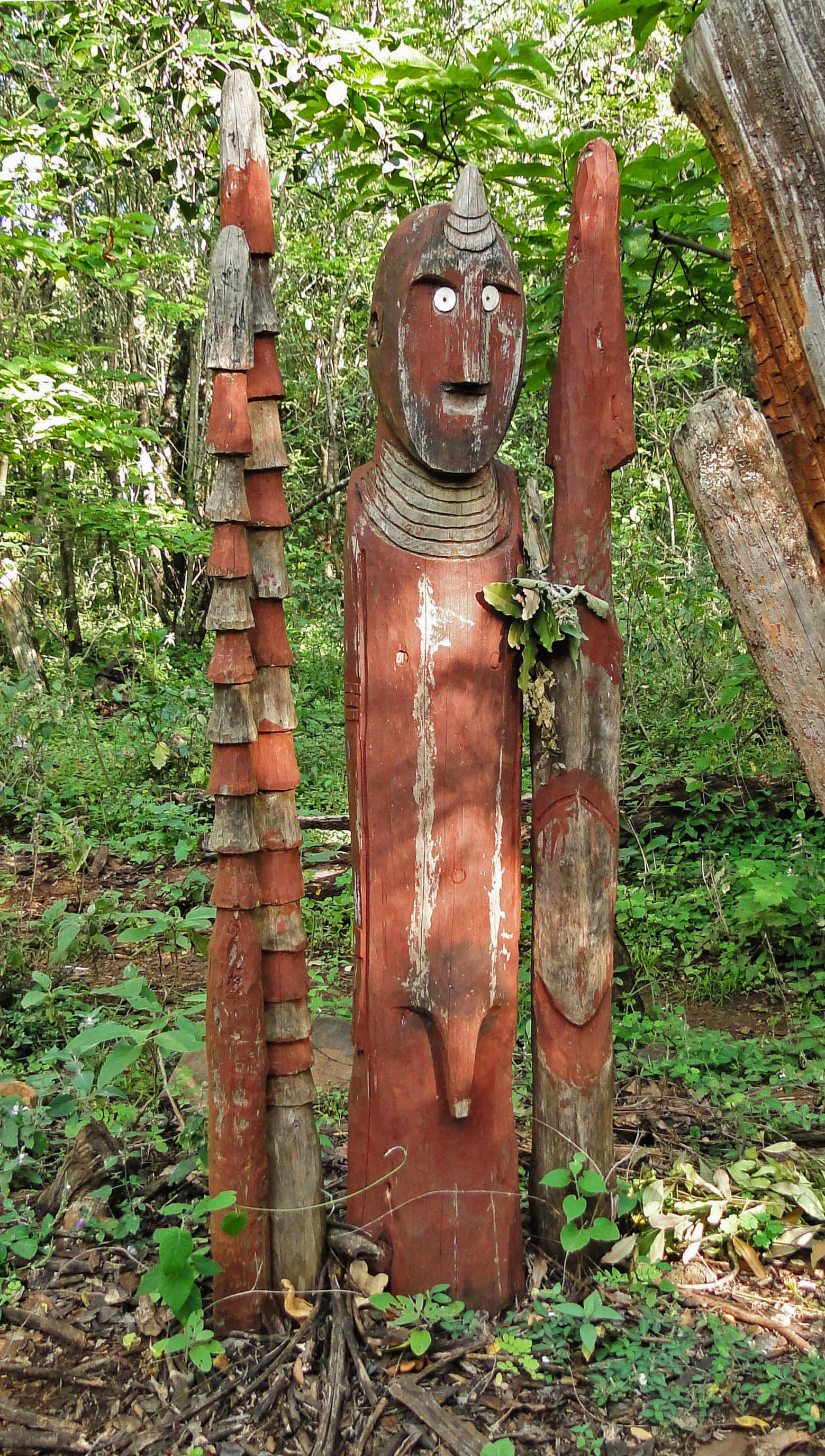
A waga near Konso, Ethiopia

A waga, also known as a waka or waaka, is a type of memorial statue carved from wood in southern Ethiopia. The Konso people are particularly well-known for their waga sculptures.

Modern wagas or mini-wagas may also be carved specifically for sale to tourists, in which case the rod-shaped kallaccas on their heads are often exaggerated into phallic shapes.
