= Holawaka =

Bird in Oromo mythology

In the mythology of the Oromo people of Ethiopia, Holawaka is a legendary bird sent by the gods as a messenger to humanity. The gods instructed Holawaka to tell humans that they would be immortal and all that they needed to do to be rejuvenated was to strip off their skins. However, on its way to deliver the message, Holawaka encountered a snake eating an animal carcass. The bird pleaded with the snake to share some of the food, but the snake only agreed when Holawaka offered to share the message it was carrying. It told the snake that when humans grow old they will die, but when snakes grow old all they have to do is shed their skin to become young again. As punishment for dooming mankind to a mortal existence, the gods inflicted a terrible disease upon Holawaka, causing it to cry out in pain forever.
