= Bakri Sapalo =

Ethiopian linguist (1895–1980)

- Born: November 1895; Harar, Ethiopia
- Died: 5 April 1980 (aged 84); Hiran, Somalia
- Occupations: scholar, poet, teacher
- Title: Sheikh

Sheikh Bakri Sapalo (In Qubee Oromo spelling: Bakrii Saphaalloo; born Abubakar Garad Usman; November 1895 – 5 April 1980) was an Oromo scholar, poet and religious teacher. He is best known as the inventor of a writing system for the Oromo language.

== Life ==
Bakri Sapalo was the son of Garad Usman Oda, a landowner in the area of the Sapalo River who was among those who were carried over into Emperor Menelik's regime after the conquest of the Emirate of Harar. His son Abubakar was born eight years after the conquest of Harar, and probably some sixteen years after Garad Usman had embraced Islam; Abubakar had three brothers and four sisters. Although reputed to have been a good Muslim and remembered to this day for his skill in oratory and command of the Oromo language, Garad Usman remained illiterate. R. J. Hayward and Mohammed Hassen speculate, based on her name, that his mother Kadiga was also a Muslim. After receiving his elementary education, Abubakar went to Chercher where he studied under the Islamic teacher Sheikh Umar Aliyye Balbaletti, and afterwards went to Harar to study with Sheikh Yusuf Adam for a number of years there. Although he also studied under other Islamic teachers, these were the only ones he wrote biographies about. Bakri obtained his educational achievement through the support of famous Harari scholar Abdalla Walensi.

After devoting 20 years of his life to his studies, he returned to his home village of Sapalo, where he began to teach. Besides religion, the subjects he taught included geography, history, mathematics, astronomy, Arabic, and the composition of writings in the Oromo language. He also began to compose poetry in the Oromo language, which not only brought him fame but the name he afterwards was known by, Sheikh Bakri Sapalo: "Bakri" is the popular form of "Abubakar" and Sapalo after his village. Sheikh Bakri eventually left Sapalo and taught in a number of places, of which the three best known are Hortu, near Dire Dawa, the city of Dire Dawa itself, and Addelle, a place some 25 kilometers from Dire Dawa, on the road to Harar. It was at Addelle where he built a school and what came to be known as his mosque. He is said to have married a local woman at every place he stayed, at least 11 of whom are known. He had eighteen children by three of his wives, thirteen sons and five daughters. Despite the large number of wives, he carefully obeyed the Muslim commandments on polygamy, for he is said never to have had more than two wives at once, and towards the end of his life he had only one wife. During this time he also wrote prolifically both in Arabic and Oromo.

He is believed to have invented his writing system for Oromo in 1956 at the village of Hagi Qome. Neither Hayward nor Hassan offer a reason why Sheikh Bakri returned to his home area to work on his system, "unless it was for the purpose of keeping the thing secret, for the authorities would certainly have been adamantly opposed to the idea of Oromo being written in any form, let alone in a script other than Ethiopic." Although it was initially met with great enthusiasm and found a number of users in his province of Hararghe, the Ethiopian authorities predictably reacted with fear that he was "inciting the Oromo to too great an ethnic consciousness and thus endangering the national unity." Local officials moved quickly to suppress its use, and in 1965 Sheikh Bakri was placed under house arrest in Dire Dawa but was allowed to continue his teaching. In 1968, he was given permission to visit Addelle two or three times a week. It was during these years that he wrote Shalda, a twenty-page pamphlet which purported to be a work of religious instruction, but was actually from beginning to end a caustically worded indictment of Amhara colonial oppression and an account of the suffering of the Oromo under the rule of Emperor Haile Selassie. Hayward and Hassan further note that "Shalda is of interest in that it is really both the first and the last major writing in Shaykh Bakri Sapalo's alphabet."

In 1978, after Emperor Haile Selassie was deposed and the Derg gained power, Sheikh Bakri and his wife fled the Red Terror and fled to Somalia where they were admitted to a refugee camp in Hiraan. Sheikh Bakri had hoped he would be allowed to proceed further to Mogadishu where he could work and have his writings published, but he never received permission to leave the camp. Conditions there proved too much for a man in his eighties, and he died in the camp after a prolonged illness.

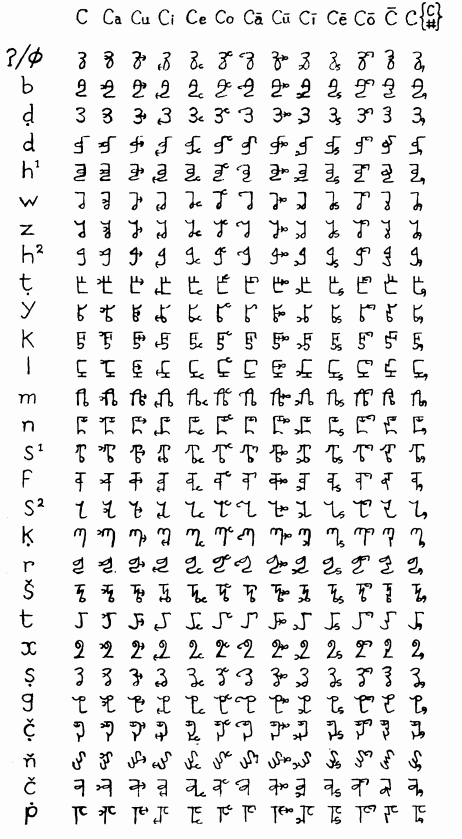
Sapalo's Oromo script letters chart.

== Works ==
Although Sheikh Bakri wrote many works both on religious and secular topics, except for a few distributed in mimeograph form all of his writings remained in manuscript form during his lifetime, and were distributed amongst his students. Hayward and Hassan list eight of his writings in Arabic, which at the time could be consulted in Mogadishu: Dirdsa fi al-mantiqa 1-Harariyya jughrafiyyan wa bashariyyan, a study of the geography and demography of the Harar region of about 200 pages; two works on history, Janaza shamarikh min hadayiz al-tawarikh 95 pages in length, and Kitab irsal al-sawarikh ila sama' al-tawarikh a history of the Oromo in 56 pages; three religious writings Al-mawahib al-madadiyyah fi l-'awf al-'adadiyya, Muqaddamat taysir al-zari'a (48 pages long), and Taysir al-zari'a ila fuquhiyy fi ahkam al-shari'a; and the two biographies of his teachers mentioned above.

Mohammed Hassan made use of Sheikh Bakri's Kitab irsal al-sawarikh ila sama' al-tawarikh in writing his The Oromo of Ethiopia, a History: 1570-1860, describing the manuscript in the bibliography as sketching "an overall panorama of Oromo history from early times to the present. Although it is not free from major limitations on early Oromo history, it contains much useful data on the gada system." Hassan relies on it heavily in his discussion on the gada system.

== Legacy ==
As noted above, Sheikh Bakri was also a renowned Oromo poet. "Shaykh Bakri, write Hayward and Hassan, "stirred the imagination and captured the love of the Oromo masses by means of his poems, which were composed in their language and were short enough for the people to learn by heart."

Sheikh Bakri Sapalo's chief accomplishment is his writing system. Although Oromo has been transcribed using two writing systems Sheikh Sapalo was familiar with, the Ge'ez script and the Arabic alphabet, both are "far from adequate" in Hayward and Hassan's opinion, for reasons they set forth. (Most important being that Amharic has only seven vowels while Oromo has 10.) While they "have no reason whatsoever to entertain the belief that Shaykh Bakri had ever studied modern linguistics, or was acquainted with the concept of the phoneme, it is nevertheless the case that his writing system is almost entirely phonemic; that is to say, it is a system achieving the ideal of just one graphic symbol for each phonologically distinctive sound of the language." They further describe his writing system as a combination of a syllabary and an alphabet in that while the Ge'ez script builds on a consonantal base, the base character never appears without a modification to show the paired vowel. However, although the symbols Sheikh Bakri adopted are not cursive, which suggests a connection with Ge'ez over Arabic, none of them can be traced to either writing system; "they are a complete novelty."

== Relevant literature ==
- Nuraddin Aman Jarso. 2012. Philological Inquiry on the History Manuscript of šayḫ Bakri Saphalo. Addis Ababa University: MA thesis. Web access to thesis.
