= Konso people =

Lowland East Cushitic ethnic group in southwestern Ethiopia

Konso/Xonsita
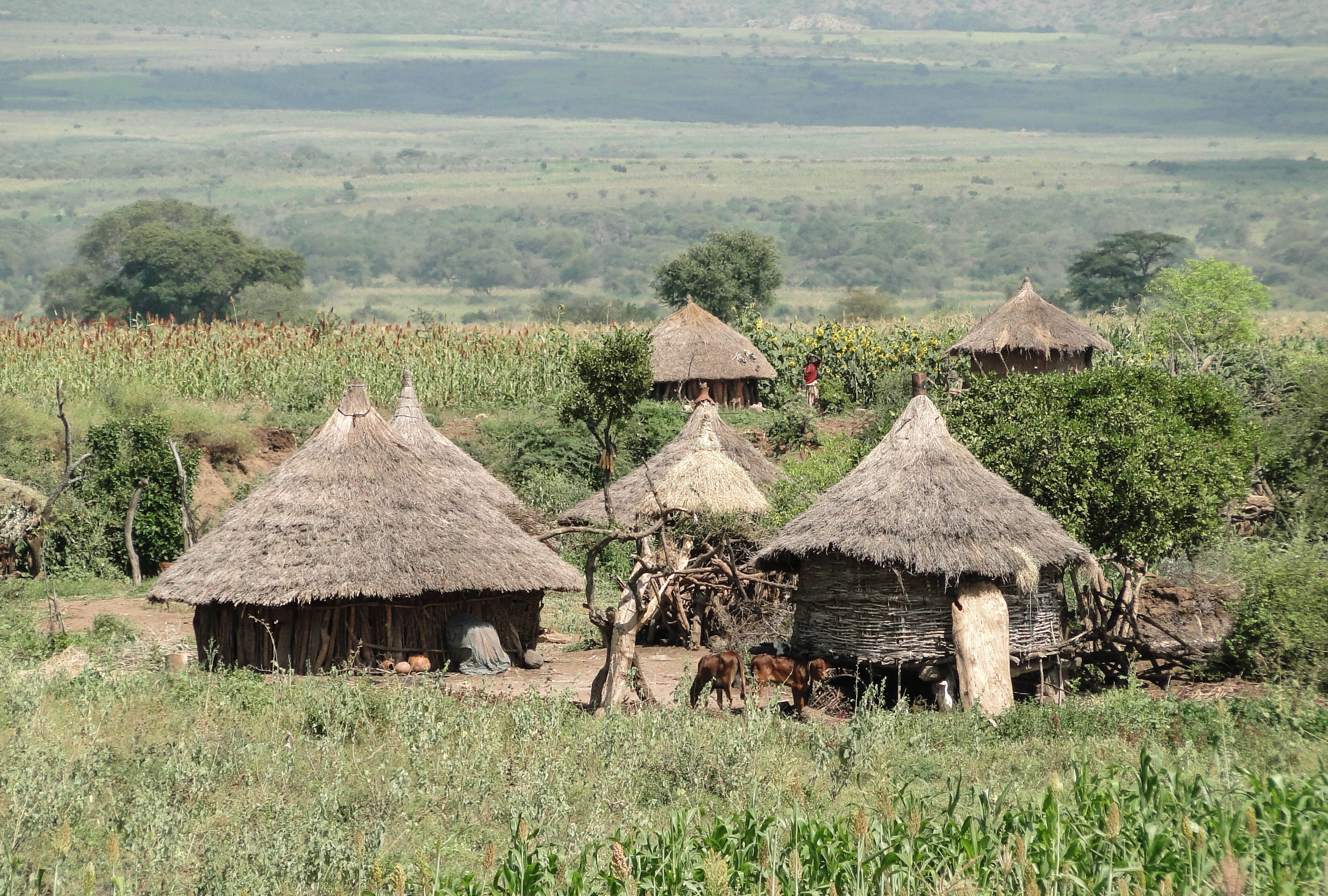
- Konso dwelling-houses

Total population
- 350,984

Regions with significant populations

Languages
- Konso

Religion
- Protestantism; Ethiopian Orthodoxy, Traditional religion (Waaqeffanna)

Related ethnic groups
- Oromo, Gamo, Sidama, Gedeo, Welayta

The Konso, also known as the Xonsita, are an ethnic group primarily inhabiting south-western Ethiopia.

== History ==
According to Hallpike (1972), Konso family traditions indicate that they are a composite people, both physically and culturally, with members originally hailing from all the surrounding areas.

In terms of physical appearance, the Konso tend to be small and wiry, with high cheekbones and pointed chins. Skin color ranges from reddish brown to almost black, but is dark brown on average. Some individuals more closely resemble the Oromo, possessing thin lips and greater stature; others have a distinctly more 'africoid' phenotype and are much shorter[?]. According to Hallpike (1972), the latter somatic characteristics are more marked amongst Konso women. George Murdock (1959) attributes the pronounced 'negroid' influence on the Konso in general to early inter-mixture with the agricultural pre-Nilotes, who entered the Ethiopian Highlands about 5000 years ago.

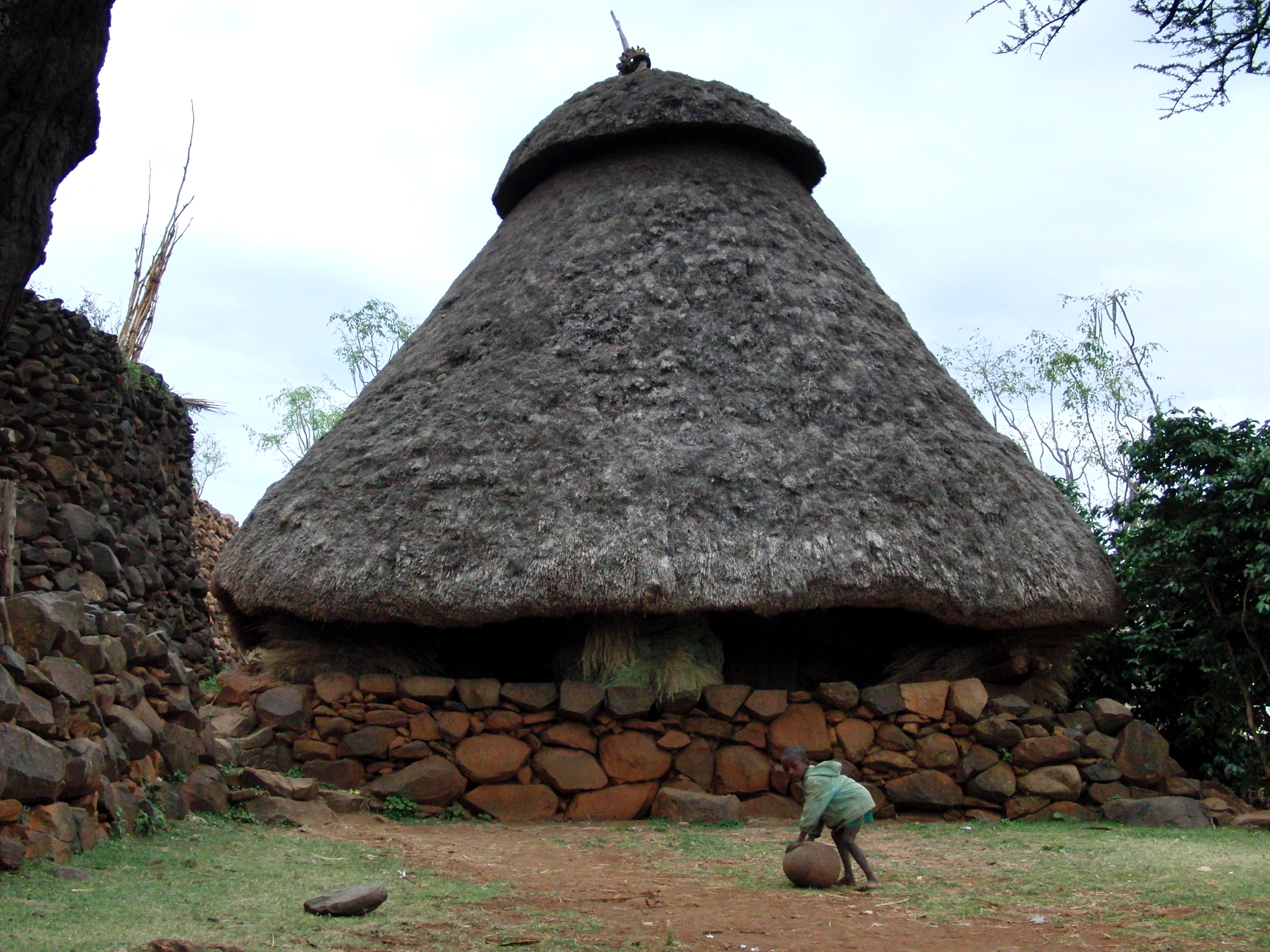
Boy playing ball in front of a Konso stone house

== Demographics ==
According to the 2007 Ethiopian national census, the Konso numbered 250,430 individuals, of whom 10,470 or 4.18% are urban dwellers. Over 87% live in the Southern Nations, Nationalities, and People's Region.

The Konso mainly reside in Ethiopia's South Ethiopia Region, south of Lake Chamo in the Sagan River bend. Many are concentrated in the Konso Zone. Their territory is adjacent to Omotic, Sidama and Oromo communities.

Konso typically live in large towns, each governed by a council of elders. A few can also be found in parts of northern Kenya.

== Language ==
The Konso speak the Konso language (Afaa Xonso) as a mother tongue. It belongs to the Cushitic branch of the Afro-Asiatic family.

Konso is divided into four dialects: Kholme, Duuro, Fasha and Karatti. It shares a close lexical similarity with Dirasha, and is today transcribed using the Ethiopic script.

== Genetics ==
Recent advances in genetic analyses have helped shed some light on the ethnogenesis of the Konso people. Genetic genealogy, although a novel tool that uses the genes of modern populations to trace their ethnic and geographic origins, has also helped clarify the possible background of the modern Konso.

=== Autosomal DNA ===
The Konso's autosomal DNA has been examined in a comprehensive study by Tishkoff et al. (2009) on the genetic affiliations of various populations in Africa. According to the researchers, the Konso showed significant Afro-Asiatic affinities. They also shared some ties with neighboring Nilo-Saharan and Bantu speakers in the Great Lakes region due to considerable genetic exchanges with these communities over the past 5000 or so years.

== Culture ==
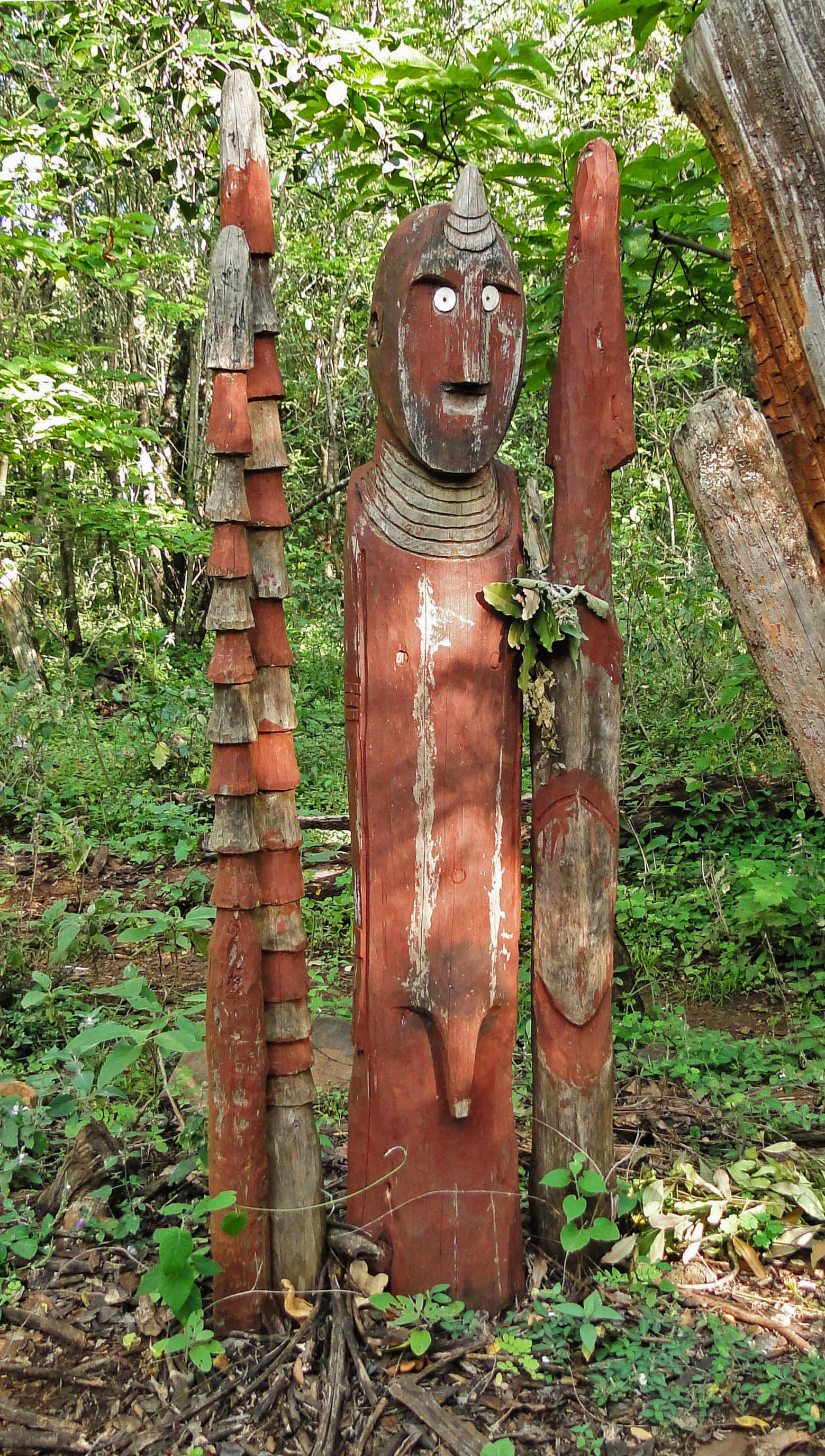
A waga (grave marker) near the town of Konso

Although there are today marked differences in customs between the Konso and their Oromo neighbors, Konso society has also retained some commonalities with traditional Oromo culture. The latter include the gadaa generation-grading system of social organization, similar high priests and a cult of phallicism.

Konso society is largely agricultural and involves the irrigation and terracing of mountain slopes. Staple crops include sorghum and corn, with cash crops including cotton and coffee. Cattle, sheep, and goats are raised for food and milk.

Polygyny is an accepted practice among the Konso.

Group members also erect carvings (wagas), which are created in memory of a dead man who has killed an enemy or animal. The statues are often arranged in groups, with statues representing the man, his wives, and his adversaries present.

=== Religion ===
About 60% of the Konso are Christians, but some still practice a traditional religion centered on the worship of Waaq/Wakh. In the related Oromo culture, Waaq denotes the god of the early faith believed to have been adhered to by Cushitic groups.

== Notable people ==
Mengistu Haile Mariam (1937–) head of state of Ethiopia from 1977 to 1991.
