= Karati =

Town in Southern Nations, Nationalities, and People's Region, Ethiopia

Karat Konso, Pakawle
- Town
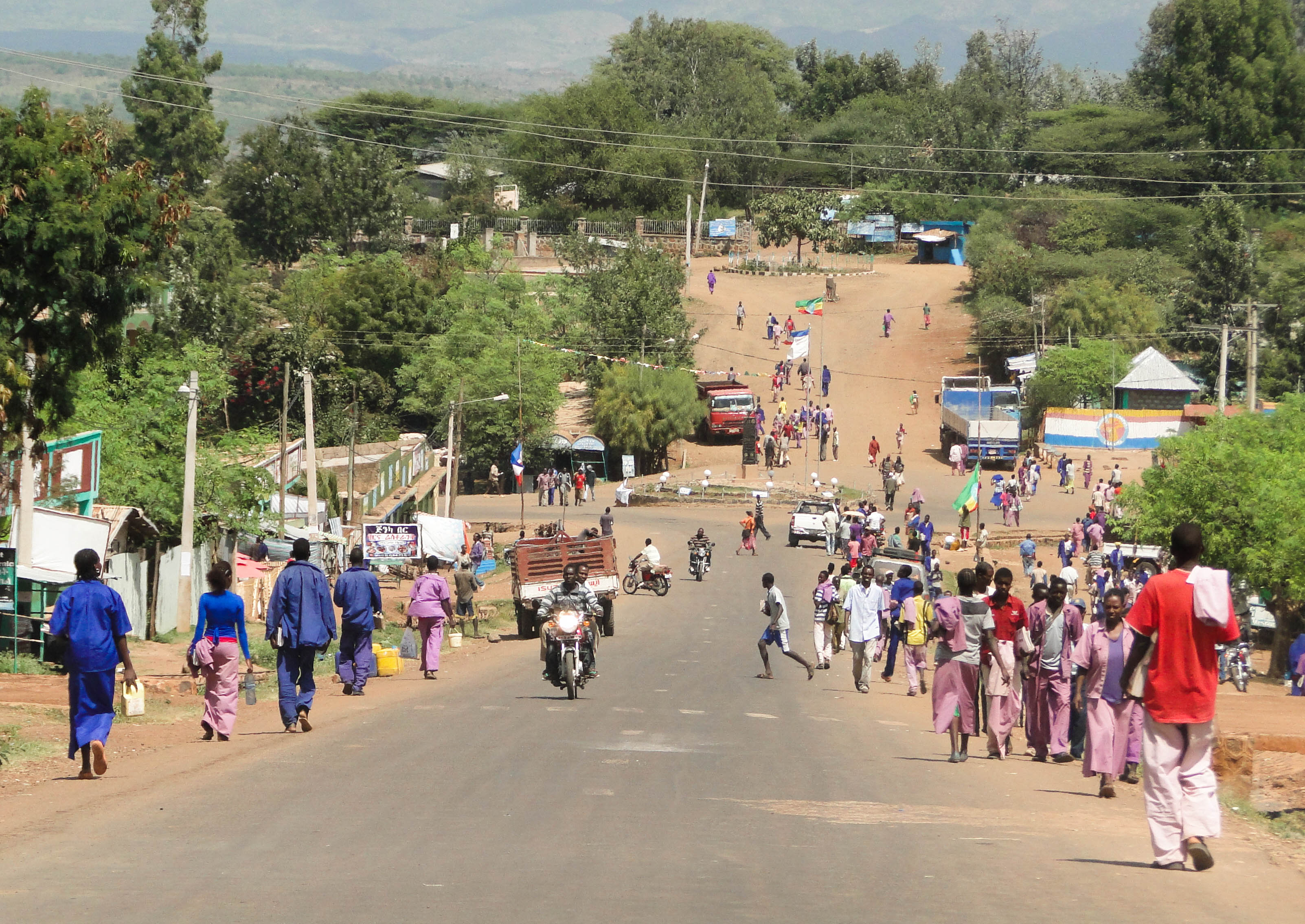

- Location within Ethiopia
- Coordinates: 5°20′23″N 37°26′31″E
- Country: Ethiopia
- Region: South Ethiopia Regional State
- Zone: Konso
- Elevation: 1,650 m (5,410 ft)

Population (2005)
  - Total: 4,593
- Time zone: UTC+3 (EAT)
  - Summer (DST): UTC+3 (not observed)

UNESCO World Heritage Site
- Criteria: Cultural: (iii), (v)
- Reference: 1333rev
- Inscription: 2011 (35th Session)
- Area: 23,000 ha (57,000 acres)

Karati (Karat) is a town in south-western Ethiopia and the capital of the Konso Zone in the new South Ethiopia Regional State (formerly, Southern Nations, Nationalities, and Peoples Region). Situated 20 km north of the Sagan River at an elevation of 1,650 metres (5,410 ft), it is also called Pakawle by some of the neighboring inhabitants. The town and the surrounding villages were inscribed on the UNESCO World Heritage List in 2011 as a cultural landscape for its unique cultural traditions and importance for the Konso people.

== History ==
Oral traditions of the Konso people suggest that they migrated to the region roughly 400 years ago, which is supported by the number of generations (21) noted since the first ritual chief. In 1897, Menelik II took over the city.

Father Azaïs presented the Waga (wa'kka) statues in 1931. In 1956, Murdock associated the archeological megaliths of the town to a cushitic signature. In Kluckhohn's Markets of Africa published in 1962, the author traces high levels of ancient economic developments in the city. In 1984, Amborn studied the historic labor-intensive agricultural techniques of the region.

The site was added to the UNESCO World Heritage Tentative List on September 30, 1997, due to its purported universal cultural significance and official made a World Heritage Site in 2011. Konso is the first place in Ethiopia recognized as a "cultural landscape".

A permaculture farm, Strawberry Fields Eco-Lodge, was founded in 2007 north of town and works with international volunteers and three local schools to grow food, promote ecotourism, and provide permaculture education.

== Cultural landscape ==
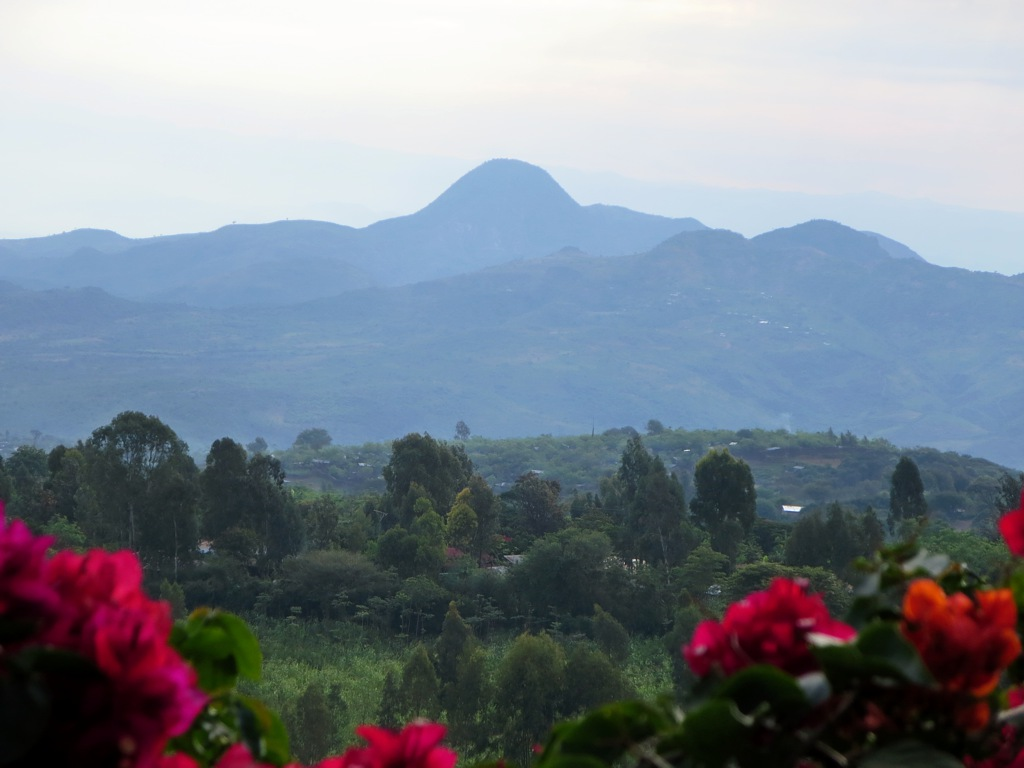
Landscape view of Konso

The landscape around Konso is heavily terraced, in order to protect against soil erosion from the sporadic and often heavy rainfall in the region. The terraces are steep (some of which reach 8 metres (26 ft) in height) and reinforced with stone. Additional reinforcing turrets and buttresses are built along the retaining wall. Building and maintaining the terraces usually requires the entire family.

Walled settlements called paletas are located on the high plants and hilltops of the regions for their strategic advantage. The villages are encircled by one to six concentric rings of stone walls, mainly consisting of basalt boulders. The oldest walls on the inside can be up to 4 metres (13 ft) high and 2.5 metres (8 ft 2 in) wide. Inside the paletas, the Konso live in individual compounds consisting of several thatched structures, including granaries, houses, and cattle kraals. The villages also contain are often several large gathering spaces called moras, used for communal and ceremonial purposes.

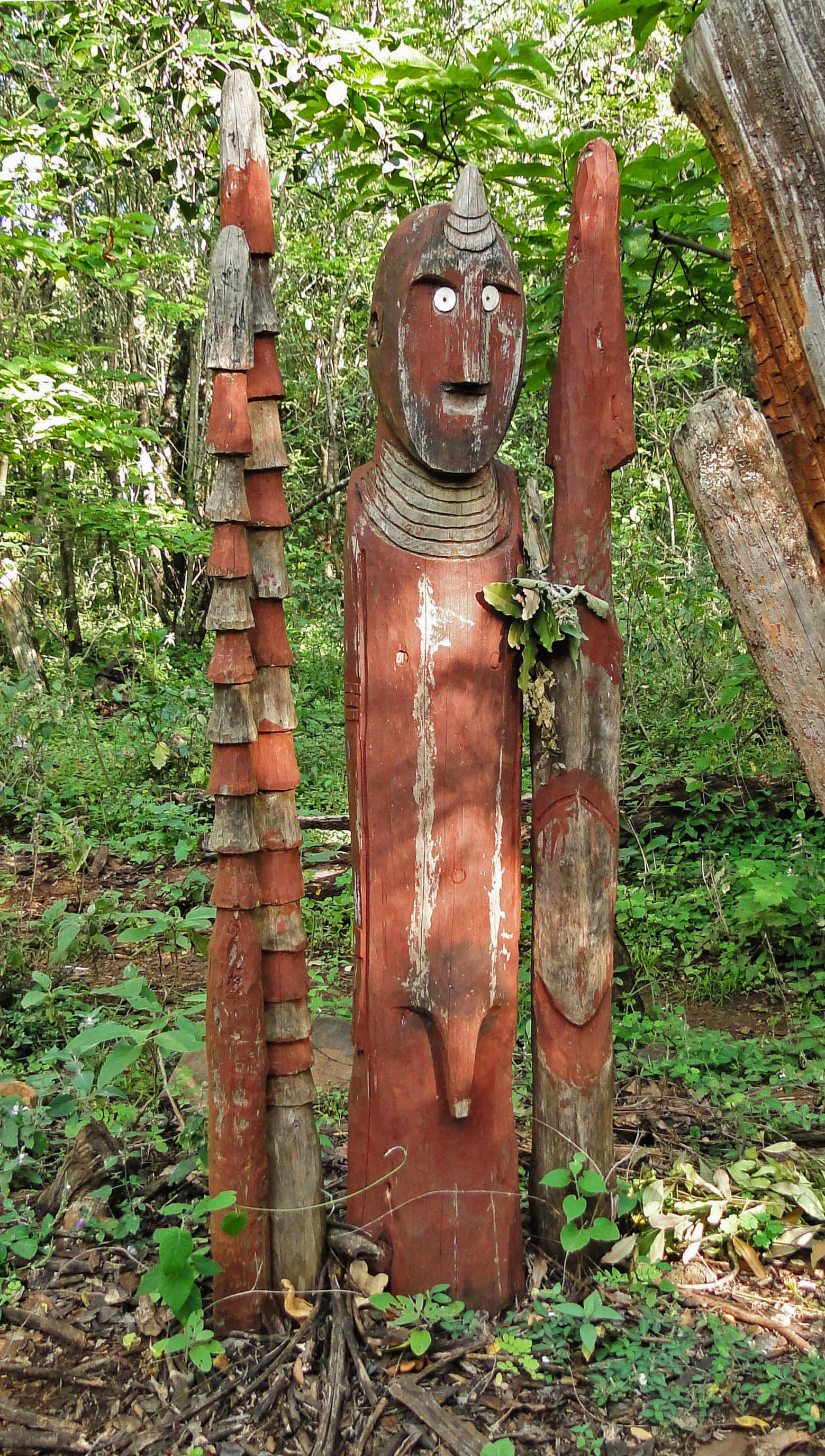
Waga sculptures

The Konso people maintain a unique tradition of erecting generation marking stones, called daga-hela, which are quarried and transported through a ritual process. In addition, they are known for their waga sculptures, statues that memorialize deceased members of the community. These statues are often stylized and anthropomorphic, describing the community member, their families, and sometimes important events in their lives. The sacred forests near the paletas contain several important ritual locations, especially for initiations, and serve as the burial places for the ritual leaders.

Near the Konso hills are fossil beds with a high density of early hominid remains.

== Economy ==
Philip Briggs suggests that the present-day town "might prosaically be described as a traffic circle of comically vast dimensions, surrounded by a solitary petrol station and a scattering of local hotels." According to the SNNPR's Bureau of Finance and Economic Development, as of 2003 Konso's amenities include digital telephone access, postal service, electricity provided by a generator, and a branch of a microfinance organization. Local industries include beekeeping, cotton weaving, and agriculture. The market is held on Mondays and Thursdays at a point 2 kilometers from town along the Jinka Road.

== Demographics ==
Based on figures from the Central Statistical Agency in 2005, Karat has an estimated total population of 4,593 of whom 2,258 are men and 2,335 are women. The 1994 national census reported this town had a total population of 2,535 of whom 1,250 were men and 1,285 were women.

== Conflict since 1990 ==
There is an ongoing conflict and land dispute with many civilians killed and hundreds of thousands of IDPs caught in the violence. UN warned that Konso was a priority hot spot area in 2022, due to the continuous conflict and the issue of adverse weather that exacerbated the existing humanitarian crisis in the Zone.

== See also ==
- List of World Heritage Sites in Ethiopia
