= Irreechaa =

Thanksgiving holiday celebrated by Oromo people

Irreecha
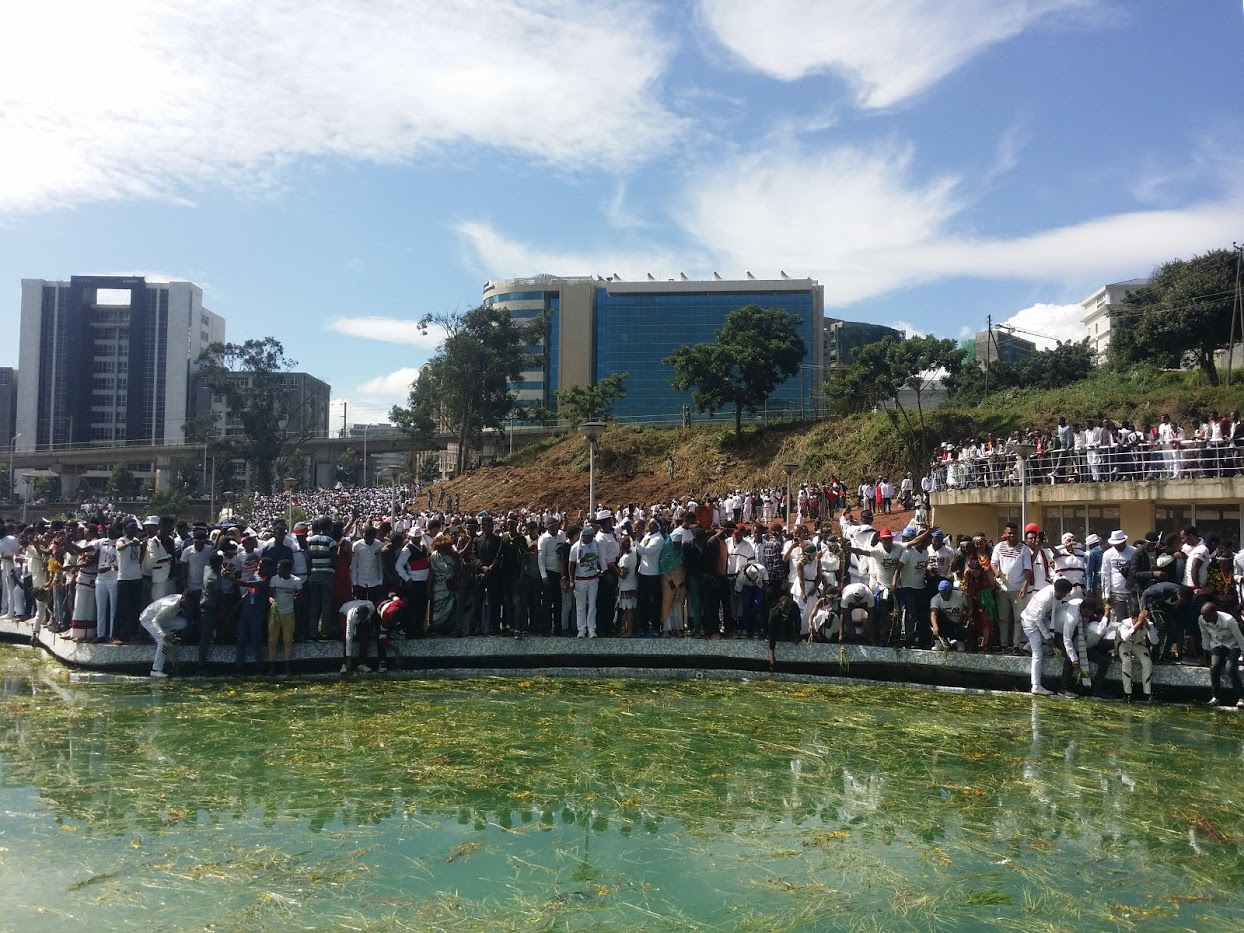
- Irreecha Festival in 2019 at Addis Ababa
- Official name: Irreecha
- Observed by: Ethiopia
- Type: National, cultural
- Significance: Thanksgiving
- Celebrations: Entertainment; Social gathering with family
- Date: In October every year
- Related to: Thanksgiving day

Irreecha (also called Irreessa or Dhibaayyuu), is a Thanksgiving holiday celebrating the end of the winter in Oromia Region, Ethiopia. Irreecha is the most celebrated cultural festival in Africa. The Oromo people celebrate Irreecha to thank (God) for the blessings and mercies they have received throughout the previous year. The Irreecha festival is celebrated every year at the beginning of (Spring), the new season after the dark and rainy winter season. It is attended by hundreds of thousands people. The Thanksgiving is celebrated at sacred lakes across Oromia Region like the Hora Finfinne and Hora Harsadi, Bishoftu, Oromia Region as a whole. Once at the lake, festival-goers immerse freshly cut green grass and the flowers they are carrying and sprinkle themselves and place in water.

In 2019, the festival was celebrated in Addis Ababa, the capital city of Ethiopia and the regional state of Addis Ababa, followed by Irreecha in Debre Zeit. The 2020 Irreecha in Addis Ababa was celebrated by around 5,000 people due to political tension and the COVID-19 pandemic. Irreecha is also celebrated around the world where diaspora Oromos live especially in North America and Europe.

== Observance ==
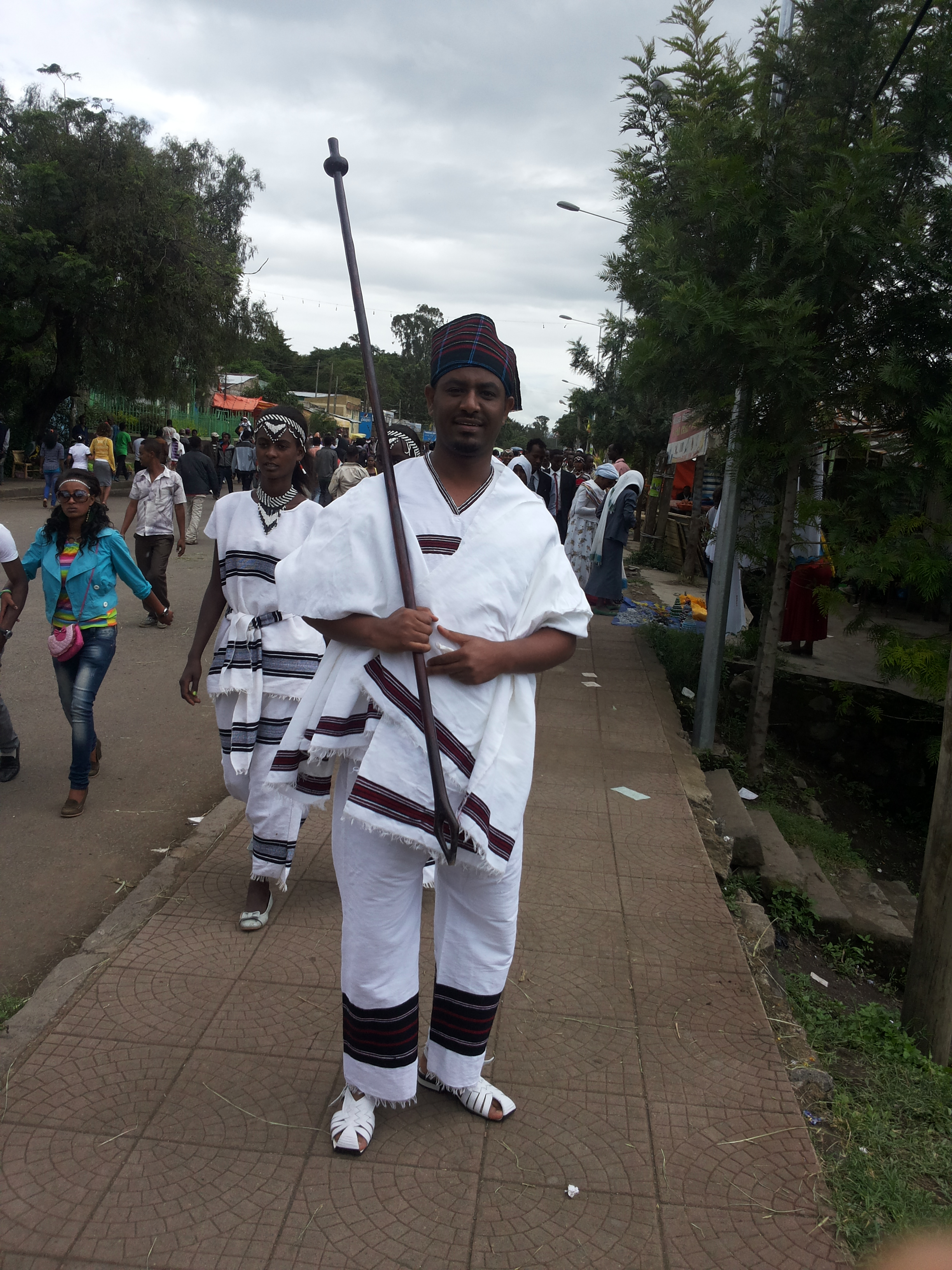
Irrecha festival (2014)

Many people interpreted the Irrecha festival of the Oromo people as a festival of difficulty period between the month of June and September. But the reality is not as many have exaggerated today. The Irrecha festival is a celebration to welcome the expected seeds and fruits of prosperity, and peace. The Oromo people also consider the winter rainy season of June to September as a time of difficulty in communication with families and friends due to heavy rains which could cause rivers to swell and floods that may drown people, cattle, crop, and flood homes. Also, family relationships will suffer during winter rain as they can not visit each other because of swelling rivers. In addition, winter time could be a time of hunger for some because the previous harvest collected in January is running short and the new harvest is not ripe yet. Because of this, some families may endure food shortages during the winter. In Birraa (Spring in Oromoland), this shortage ends as many food crops especially maize is ripe and families can eat their fill. Other crops like potato, barley, etc. will also be ripe in Birraa. Some disease types like malaria also break out during rainy winter time. Because of this, the Oromos see winter as a difficult season. It does not mean the Oromo people hate rain or the winter season at all. Even when there is a shortage of rain, they pray to Waaqa (God) for rain.

The Oromo people celebrate Irreecha not only to thank Waaqa (God) but also to welcome the new season of plentiful harvests after the dark and rainy winter season associated with nature and creatures. At Irreecha festivals, friends, family, and relatives gather together and celebrate with joy and happiness. Irreecha festivals bring people closer to each other and make social bonds.

Moreover, the Oromo people celebrate this auspicious event to mark the end of the rainy season, known as Ganna, which was established by Oromo forefathers, in the time of Gadaa Melbaa in Mormor, Oromia. The auspicious day on which this last Mormor Day of Gadaa Melbaa - the Dark Time of starvation and hunger- was established on the Sunday of last week of September or the Sunday of the 1st week of October according to the Gadaa lunar calendar has been designated as National Thanksgiving Day by modern-day Oromo people.

== Stampede ==
On 2 October 2016, between 55 and 300 festival goers were killed in a stampede at the Irreecha cultural thanksgiving festival, which was the largest and most sacred cultural festival for the Oromo people. In just one day, dozens were killed and many more were injured during the stampede. Locals blamed security forces for triggering the stampede.
