= Gadaa =

Governance system practiced among Oromo community

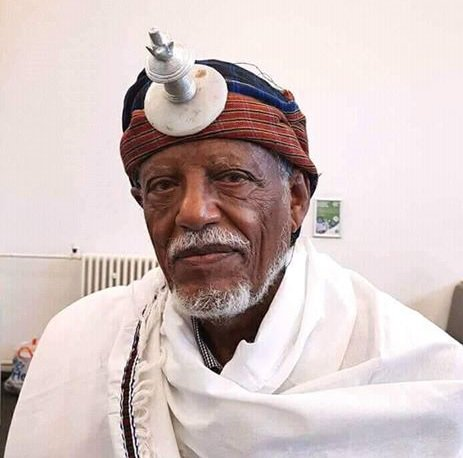
Professor Asmerom Legesse in Abbaa Gadaa garb.

Gadaa flag

Gadaa (pronounced "Gada" meaning "The Gateway" in Oromoo language) is the indigenous system of governance used by the Oromos in Ethiopia and northern Kenya. It is also practiced by the Konso, Burji and Gedeo people of southern Ethiopia. The system regulates political, economic, social and religious activities of the community.

Under Gadaa, every eight years, the Oromo would choose by consensus nine leaders known as Salgan ya’ii Borana (the nine Borana assemblies). A leader elected by the gadaa system remains in power only for 8 years, with an election taking place at the end of those 8 years. Whenever an Abbaa Gadaa dies while exercising his functions, the bokkuu (the symbol of power) passes to his wife and she keeps the bokkuu and proclaims the laws.

The Gada system has been inscribed by UNESCO as Intangible Cultural Heritage since 2016. It is the brainchild of Oromo from the Meda Welabu district of Oromia. Oromo people regarded the system as their common heritage and as a major part of their cultural identity. It is the system with which the Oromo people have been governing themselves in a democratic way for centuries.

The Oromo governed themselves in accordance with the Gadaa system long before the 16th century, when three major party wars commenced between them and the Ethiopian Empire to their north and Adal Sultanate to their east and south. The result was that Oromo absorbed of the Christian and Islam religions. The Boorana and Gujii Oromo groups near the Ethiopian-Kenyan border were able to practice Gadaa without interruption. In the state of Oromia under the Federal system of Ethiopia, the Gadaa system started a renaissance across Oromia. In 2015, the Gadaa Center at Odaa Bultum was inaugurated and in 2018, the Gadaa Center at Odaa Hullee reinstalled after two centuries of interruption. In 2019, Bule Hora University launched a master's degree program in Gadaa studies.

== Characteristics ==
=== Luba ===
The Gadaa society was structured into peer groups based on chronological age or genealogical generation called Luba. Each luba consists of all of the sons in another particular class. The entire grade progresses through eleven different grades, each based on an eight-year cycle, and each with its own set of rights and responsibilities.

Gadaa Grades
	Daballe	Junior Gaammee	Foollee	Kuusaa	Raabaa Doorii	Gadaa	Yuuba I	Yuuba II & III	Gadaamoojjii	Jaarsa
Age	0–8	9–16	17–24	25–32	33–40	41–48	49–56	57–64 & 65–72	73–80	>80
Characters	No responsibility	Student	Military trainee	Military	Warrior	Leader	Advisor	Repositories of law	Conducts Rites	No responsibility

The grade passes from one stage of development to the next every eight years.

=== Baallii ===
Baallii is a process of transferring power from one Gadaa party to the next.

=== Gadaa Party (Gogeessa Gadaa) ===
There are five Gadaa parties known as shanan Gadaa Oromoo. These parties follow the five world views of the Oromo people. The five Gadaa parties orderly come to power. A party come to power once every forty years. Hence, there would not be direct competition among the five Gadaa parties, rather the competition would be among individuals within a party. The five Gadaa parties have different names among Boorana, Maccaa-Tuulama, Arsii, Gujii and Ituu-Humbannaa.

Gadaa Parties
Boorana	Maccaa-Tuulama	Arsii	Gujii	Ituu-Humbannaa
Meelba / Harmufaa	Birmajii	Birmajii	Harmufa	Horata
Muudana / Roobalee	Michilee / Muudana	Roobalee	Roobalee	Dibbaaqa
Kiilolee / Birmajii	Duuloo / Halchiisa	Bahara	Muudana	Dibbeessa
Biifolee / Muldhata	Meelbaa / Hambissaa	Horata	Halchiisa	Fadata
Michilee / Duuloo	Roobalee	Daraara		

== Research ==
Several scholars have studied Gadaa. Eritrean anthropologist Asmarom Legesse wrote that Gadaa is "one of the most astonishing and instructive turns the evolution of human society has taken". In addition to his Harvard PhD dissertation, Legesse published a book, Oromo Democracy, that positions Gadaa as an African democracy that could inform constitutional thinkers. Donald N. Levine said Gadaa is "one of the most complex systems of social organization ever devised by the human imagination". For Jalata, Gadaa represents "the totality of Oromo civilization".

== Role of women ==
Primarily, Gadaa system is an ancient philosophy of socio-political system that responsible for regulating Political stability, Economic growth, social services, Cultural commitments, Ethical contract of the religious order of the Oromo society and practice Gadaa Democracy that require equal participation of both male and female. Still academically debatable as Oromo women have no influences throughout the age of Gadaa decree or clan leadership structure but the wife of designated Abbaa Gadaa is equitably treated like the Abbaa Gadaa himself. Siinqee feminist represent women in the Gadaa system.

== Current status ==
Considering the symbolic significance of Gadaa for the Oromo, as well as its structural innovations, researchers in law, indigenous studies, and pan-Africanism are exploring how the system could be utilized in the 21st century. For example, a thesis by Z. Sirna entitled "Ethiopia: When the Gadaa Democracy Rules in a Federal State" explores how the system could be integrated with the contemporary federal structure of Ethiopia, serving as a governance mechanism for the Oromia Regional National State. Sirna has analyzed the Gadaa system in relation to deliberative forms of political participation used in Western contexts. He concludes that the Gadaa systems' technique of 'consensus through dialogue' is unique but firmly rooted in Western democratic norms, and thus well suited to adoption within Ethiopia's federally structured democracy. A political party known as GSAP (Gadaa System Advancement Party) bases its ideology on the principles of Gadaa. A futuristic, governance 2.0 project called BitGadaa draws inspiration from the principles and structure of Gadaa.

== See also ==
- Irreechaa
- Cushitic-speaking peoples
- Barento
- Boorana
- Oromia
- Intangible cultural heritage

== Bibliography ==
- Ulrich Braukämper, Layers Islamic History and Culture in Southern Ethiopia (2003)
- Joseph Van de Loo, "Guji Oromo Culture in Southern Ethiopia." Berlin: Reimer, 1991.
- Asmarom Legesse, "Gadaa: Three Approaches to the Study of African Society", 1973
- Donald Levine, "Greater Ethiopia: The Evolution of a Multiethnic Society", 1974
- Asmarom Legesse, "Oromo Democracy: an Indigenous African Political System", 2006
- Asafa Jalata, Gadaa (Oromo Democracy): An Example of Classical African Civilization, Journal of Pan-African Studies (2012)
- Tenna Dewo. 2008. The Concept of Peace in the Oromo Gadaa System: Its Mechanisms and Moral Dimension. Journal of Oromo Studies 15.1: 139-180. Web access
- Z. Sirna, "Ethiopia: When the Gadaa Democracy Rules in a Federal State", 2012
- Participedia Contributors, "The Gadaa System of the Oromo People," last modified September 7, 2018, Retrieved from https://participedia.xyz/method/4865
