= Languages of Ethiopia =

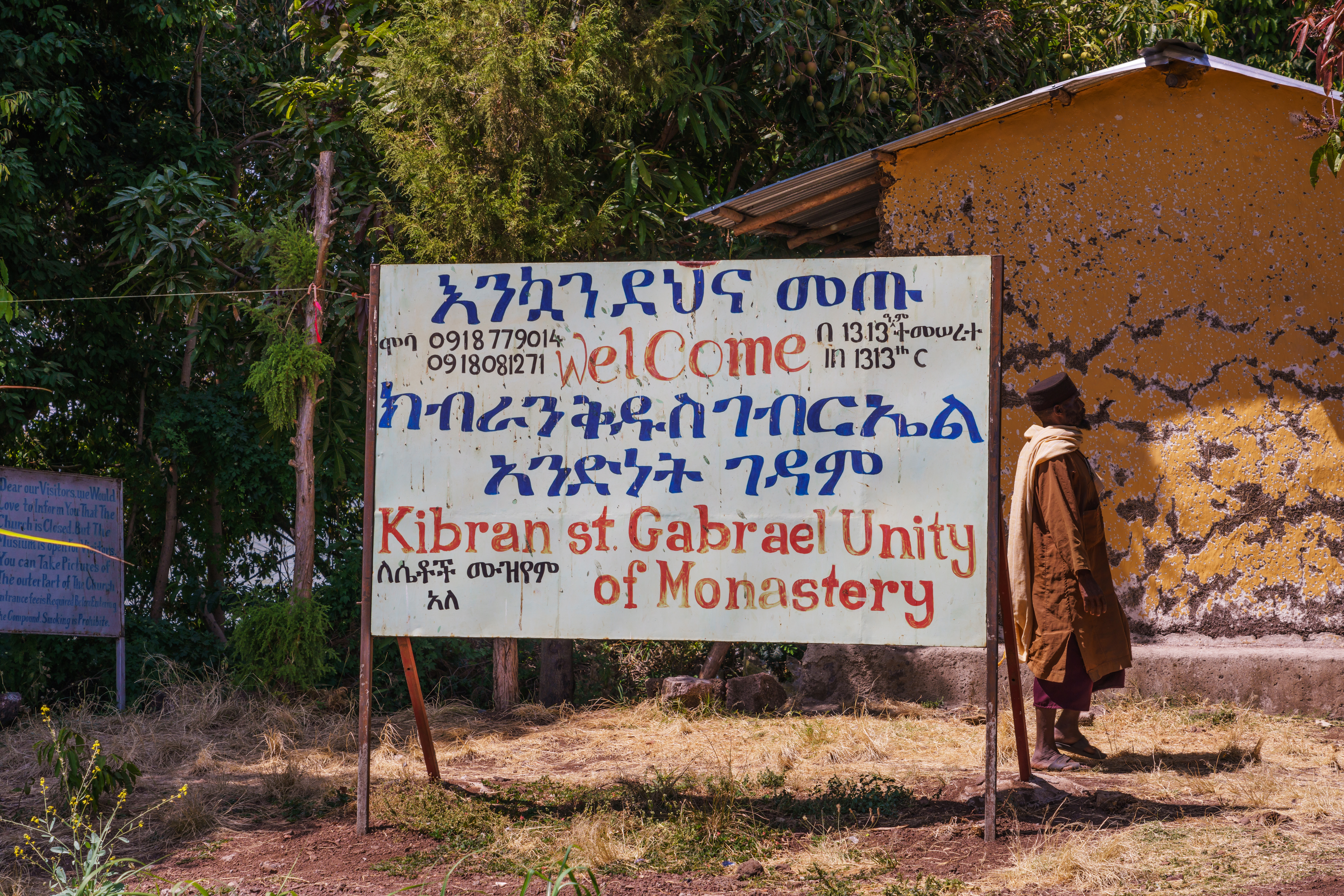
- Sign at Lake Tana in Amharic and English
- Official: Afar; Amharic; Oromo; Somali; Tigrinya
- Recognised: Sidamo; Wolaytta; Gurage; Hadiyya; Gamo; Gedeo; Silt'e; Kafa; Harari
- Foreign: English
- Signed: Ethiopian sign languages
- Keyboard layout: QWERTY

The languages of Ethiopia include the official languages of Ethiopia, its national and regional languages, and a large number of minority languages, as well as foreign languages.

== Overview ==
=== Number of languages ===
According to Glottolog, there are 109 languages spoken in Ethiopia, while Ethnologue lists 90 individual languages spoken in the country. Most people in the country speak Afroasiatic languages of the Cushitic or Semitic branches. The former includes the Oromo language, spoken by the Oromo, and Somali, spoken by the Somali; the latter includes Amharic, spoken by the Amhara, and Tigrinya, spoken by the Tigrayans. Together, these four groups make up about three-quarters of Ethiopia's population. Other Afroasiatic languages with a significant number of speakers include the Cushitic Sidamo, Afar, Hadiyya and Agaw languages, as well as the Semitic Gurage languages, Harari, Silt'e, and Argobba languages. Arabic, which also belongs to the Afroasiatic family, is likewise spoken in some areas.

Charles A. Ferguson proposed the Ethiopian language area, characterized by shared grammatical and phonological features in 1976. This sprachbund includes the Afroasiatic languages of Ethiopia, not the Nilo-Saharan languages. In 2000, Mauro Tosco questioned the validity of Ferguson's original proposal. There is still no agreement among scholars on this point, but Tosco has at least weakened Ferguson's original claim.

Of the languages spoken in Ethiopia, 91 are living and 1 is extinct. 41 of the living languages are institutional, 14 are developing, 18 are vigorous, 8 are in danger of extinction, and 5 are near extinction.

According to data from 2021 from Ethnologue, the largest first languages are:

- Oromo speakers numbering more than 36 million speakers;
- Amharic speakers numbering 31,800,000;
- Somali speakers numbering 6,720,000;
- Tigrinya speakers numbering 6,390,000;
- Sidama speakers numbering 4,340,000;
- Wolaytta speakers numbering 2,380,000;
- Sebat Bet Gurage speakers numbering 2,170,000;
- Afar speakers numbering 1,840,000.

Arabic, which also belongs to the Afroasiatic family, is spoken in some areas of Ethiopia. Many Muslim Ethiopians are also able to speak Arabic because of their religious background.

English is the most widely spoken foreign language and is taught in many schools.

== Languages ==
=== Commonly used and regional languages ===
Distribution of languages of Ethiopia (2007)
Oromo	33.8%
Amharic	29.3%
Somali	6.2%
Tigrinya	5.9%
Sidamo	4.0%
Wolaytta	2.2%
Gurage (Note: In a 2001 referendum, over 98% of Siltʼe people, speakers of an East Gurage language, voted to separate from the Gurage. Speakers of North Gurage languages, West Gurage languages, and other East Gurage languages are counted as Gurage speakers, with the most common of those languages being Sebat Bet.)	2.0%
Afar	1.7%
Hadiyya	1.7%
Gamo	1.5%
Gedeo	1.3%
Siltʼe	1.2%
Kafa	1.1%
Other languages	8.1%

English is the most widely spoken foreign language. It is the medium of instruction in secondary schools and all tertiary education; federal laws are also published in British English in the Federal Negarit Gazeta including the 1995 constitution.

Amharic was the language of primary school instruction, but has been replaced in many areas by regional languages such as Oromo, Somali or Tigrinya. While all languages enjoy equal state recognition in the 1995 Constitution of Ethiopia and Oromo is the most populous language by native speakers, Amharic is the most populous by number of total speakers.

After the fall of the Derg in 1991, the 1995 Constitution of Ethiopia granted all ethnic groups the right to develop their languages and to establish first language primary education systems. This is a marked change to the language policies of previous governments in Ethiopia. Amharic is recognised as the official working language of Amhara Region, Benishangul-Gumuz, Southern Nations, Nationalities, and Peoples' Region, Gambela Region, Addis Ababa and Dire Dawa. Oromo language serves as the official working language and the primary language of education in the Oromia, Harar and Dire Dawa and of the Oromia Zone in the Amhara Region. Somali is the official working language of Somali Region and Dire Dawa, while Afar, Harari, and Tigrinya are recognized as official working languages in their respective regions. Recently, the Ethiopian Government announced that Afar, Amharic, Oromo, Somali, and Tigrinya are adopted as official federal working languages of Ethiopia. Italian is still spoken by some parts of the population, mostly among the older generation, and is taught in some schools (most notably the Istituto Statale Italiano Omnicomprensivo di Addis Abeba). Amharic and Tigrinya have both borrowed some words from the Italian language.

=== Writing systems ===
In terms of writing systems, Ethiopia's principal orthography is the Ge'ez script, employed as an abugida for several of the country's languages. For instance, it was the primary writing system for Afan Oromo until 1991. The Ethiopic script first came into usage in the sixth and fifth centuries BC as an abjad to transcribe the Semitic Ge'ez language. Ge'ez now serves as the liturgical language of the Ethiopian and Eritrean Orthodox and Catholic Churches. Other writing systems have also been used over the years by different Ethiopian communities. These include Arabic script for writing some Ethiopian languages spoken by Muslim populations and Sheikh Bakri Sapalo's script for Oromo. Today, many Cushitic, Omotic, and Nilo-Saharan languages are written in Roman/Latin script.

=== Special status of Amharic ===
Amharic has been the official working language of Ethiopian courts and its armed forces, trade and everyday communications since the late 12th century. Although now it is only one of the five official languages of Ethiopia, together with Oromo, Somali, Afar, and Tigrinya – until 2020 Amharic was the only Ethiopian working language of the federal government. Amharic is the most widely spoken and written language in Ethiopia. As of 2018, Amharic was spoken by 31.8 million native speakers in Ethiopia with over 25 million secondary speakers in the nation.

Although additional languages are used, Amharic is still predominantly spoken by all ethnic groups in Addis Ababa. Additionally, three million emigrants outside of Ethiopia speak Amharic. Most of the Ethiopian Jewish communities in Ethiopia and Israel speak it too.

In Washington, D.C., Amharic became one of the six non-English languages in the Language Access Act of 2004, which allows government services and education in Amharic.

Furthermore, Amharic is considered a holy language by the Rastafari religion and is widely used among its followers worldwide.

=== Endangered languages ===
A number of Ethiopian languages are endangered: they may not be spoken in one or two generations and may become extinct, victims of language death, as Weyto, Gafat, and Mesmes have and Ongota very soon will. The factors that contribute to language death are complex, so it is not easy to estimate which or how many languages are most vulnerable. Hudson wrote, "Assuming that a language with fewer than 10,000 speakers is endangered, or likely to become extinct within a generation", there are 22 endangered languages in Ethiopia (1999:96). However, a number of Ethiopian languages never have had populations even that high, so it is not clear that this is an appropriate way to calculate the number of endangered languages in Ethiopia. The real number may be lower or higher. The new language policies after the 1991 revolution have strengthened the use of a number of languages. Publications specifically about endangered languages in Ethiopia include: Appleyard (1998), Hayward (1988), and Zelealem (1998a,b, 2004)

== List of languages ==
=== Afroasiatic ===
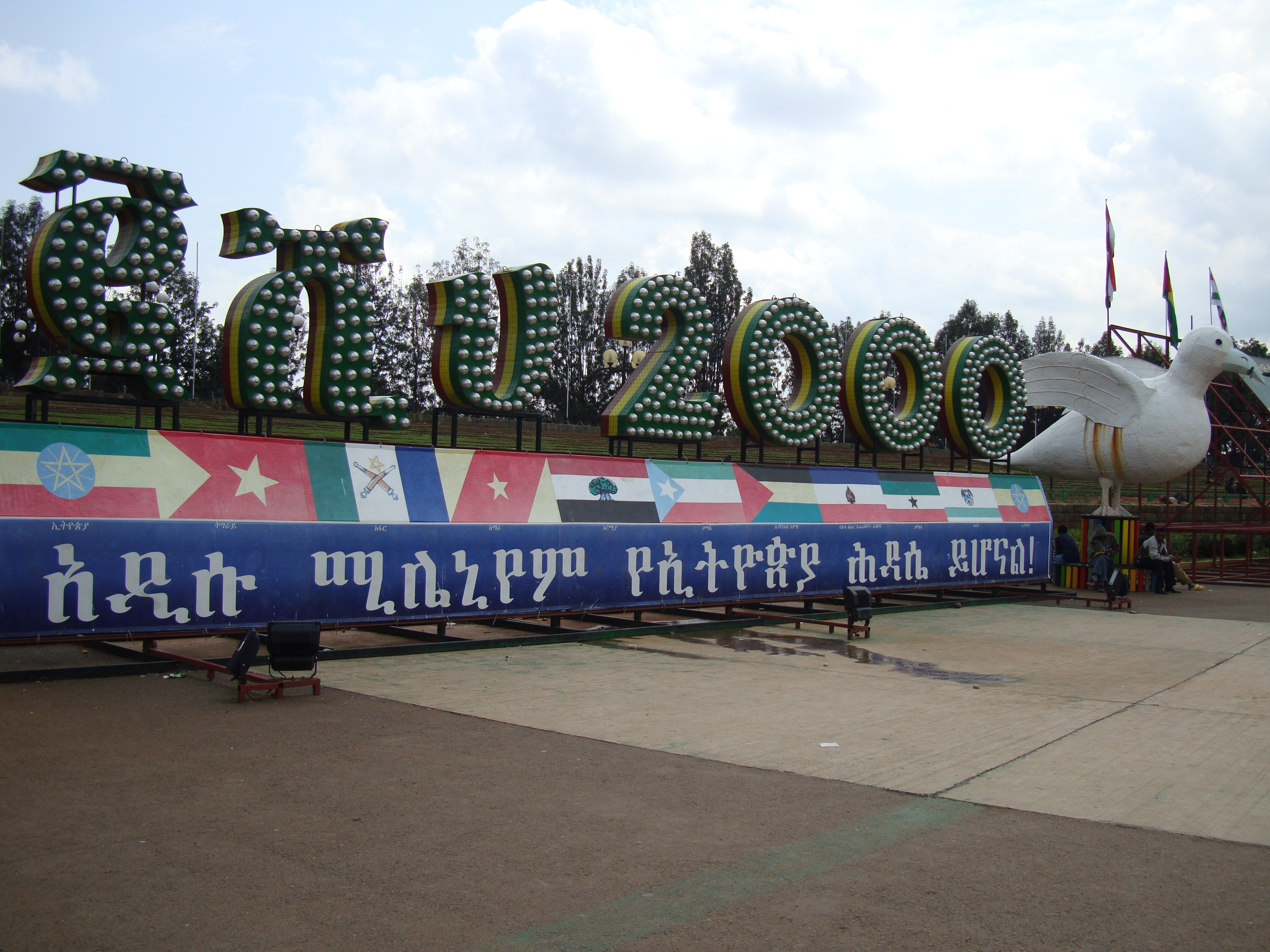
Sign in Amharic at the Ethiopian millennium celebration.

Afroasiatic

- Ethiopian Semitic
  - North Ethiopic
    - Tigrinya language (also in Eritrea)
    - Ge'ez language (also in Eritrea: extinct, liturgical)
  - South Ethiopic
    - Transversal
      - Amharic language
      - Argobba language
      - Harari language
      - East Gurage languages
        - Silt'e language (Ulbareg, Inneqor, Wolane)
        - Zay language
    - Outer South Ethiopic
      - Gafat language (extinct)
      - North Gurage languages
        - Soddo language, incl. dialect Goggot (Dobi)
      - West Gurage languages
        - Chaha language (Sebat Bet Gurage)
        - Ezha language
        - Gumer language
        - Gura language
        - Inor language
          - Gyeto language
          - Endegen language
          - Mesmes language (extinct)
        - Mesqan language
        - Muher language

==== Cushitic ====
- Cushitic
  - Agaw languages
    - Awngi language, incl. dialect Kunfal
    - Qimant language
    - Xamtanga language
  - East Cushitic
    - Highland East Cushitic languages
      - Burji language
      - Sidaama-Hadiyya-Kambaata
        - Alaba language
        - Gedeo language
        - Hadiyya language
        - Kambaata language
        - Libido language
        - Sidamo language
    - Lowland East Cushitic languages
      - Saho-Afar
        - Afar language (also in Eritrea and in Djibouti)
        - Saho language (also in Eritrea and in Ethiopia spoken by the Irob people)
      - Mainstream Lowland East Cushitic
        - Omo-Tana
          - Baiso language
          - Eastern Omo-Tana
            - Girirra language
            - Somali language (also in Somalia, Somaliland, Djibouti, and Kenya)
          - Western Omo-Tana
            - Arbore language
            - Daasanach language (also in Kenya)
        - Oromoid
          - Bussa language
          - Konso language
          - Dirasha language
          - Oromo language (also in Kenya)
      - Dullay languages
        - Dobase language
        - Gawwada language
        - Tsamai language

==== Omotic ====
- Omotic (Afro-Asiatic classification and overall unity uncertain)
  - Damotic languages
    - Anfillo language
    - Basketo language
    - Bench language
    - Boro language, also called Shinasha
    - Chara language
    - Dawro language
    - Dorze language
    - Gamo language
    - Gofa language
    - Kachama-Ganjule language
    - Kafa language
    - Koorete language
    - Male language
    - Melo language
    - Oyda language
    - Shekkacho language
    - Wolaytta language
    - Yemsa language
    - Zayse-Zergulla language
  - Mao languages
    - Bambassi language
    - Ganza language
    - Hozo language
    - Seze language
  - Dizoid languages
    - Dizi language
    - Nayi language
    - Sheko language
  - Aroid languages
    - Aari language
    - Dime language
    - Gayil language
    - Hamer-Banna
    - Karo language

=== Nilo-Saharan ===
In Ethiopia, the term "Nilotic" is often used to refer to Nilo-Saharan languages and their communities. However, in academic linguistics, "Nilotic" is only part of "Nilo-Saharan", a segment of the larger Nilo-Saharan family.

Nilo-Saharan

- Nilotic languages
  - Anuak language (also in South Sudan)
  - Nuer language (also in South Sudan)
  - Nyangatom language
- Surmic languages
  - Kacipo-Balesi language (also in South Sudan)
  - Kwegu language
  - Majang language
  - Me'en language
  - Murle language (also in South Sudan)
  - Mursi language
  - Suri language
- Koman languages (Nilo-Saharan affinity disputed)
  - Komo language
  - Kwama language
  - Opuuo language
  - Uduk language (also in Sudan)
- others
  - Berta language
  - Gumuz language (Nilo-Saharan affinity disputed)
  - Kunama language (also in Eritrea)
  - Shabo language (Nilo-Saharan affinity disputed)

=== Unclassified ===
- Weyto language (extinct — could have been Cushitic or Semitic)
- Ongota (moribund — possibly Omotic or an independent branch of Afroasiatic or not Afroasiatic at all)
- Rer Bare language (extinct — maybe Bantu)
