= Chara language =

Omotic language of Ethiopia

Chara
- Pronunciation: sʼaːra
- Native to: Ethiopia
- Native speakers: 13,000 (2007 census)
- Language family: Afro-Asiatic: Omotic; North; Ometo; Chara
- Writing system: None

Language codes
- ISO 639-3: cra
- Glottolog: char1269
- ELP: C'ara

Chara (alternatively Ciara or C’ara) is an Afro-Asiatic language of the North Omotic variety spoken in the Southern Nations, Nationalities, and People's Region of Ethiopia by 13,000 people.

== Status ==
Chara is geographically situated to the southeast of Nayi, west of Kullo, northeast of Mesketo, and northwest of Gofa. Chara speakers live in the Southern Nations, Nationalities, and People's Region, in the Debub Omo Zone, on both sides of the Omo river. Chara speakers are scattered in three villages in Ethiopia: Geba a meša, Buna Anta, and Kumba. Native speakers may also speak Melo, Wolaytta (54% lexical similarity with Chara) to the east, and Kafa to the west.

== Phonology ==
=== Consonants ===
Consonant phonemes of Chara
		Labial	Alveolar	Palatoalveolar/ Palatal	Velar	Glottal
Nasal^{1}		m	n	[ɲ]		
Plosive	Voiceless	p	t		k	ʔ
Plosive	Voiced	b	d		ɡ	
Plosive	Ejective	pʼ	tʼ		kʼ	
Plosive	Implosive	ɓ	(ɗ)			
Affricate	Voiceless		ts	tɕ		
Affricate	Voiced			dʑ		
Affricate	Ejective		sʼ	tɕʼ		
Fricative		[f]	s	ɕ,(ʑ)		h
Approximant		w		j		
Trill			r			
Lateral			l			

[p] and [f] are in free variation. /ɗ/ only occurs in the word /jalɗa~jaltʼa/ 'crooked'. Yilma (2002) found /ɓ/ to occur five times in around 550 lexical items. He also found /ʑ/ occurring in two, both in the sequence /iʑa/. Occurrence of /ɗ/ and /pʼ/ may be governed by dialectal variation.

=== Vowels ===
Vowel phonemes of Chara
	Front	Central	Back
Close	i		u
Mid	e		o
Open		a	

/a/ is realized as [ə] in unstressed word-medial syllables.

Length is minimally contrastive. Minimal pairs include /mola/ 'fish', /moːla/ 'egg'; /masa/ 'to wash', /maːsa/ 'leopard'; /buna/ 'flower', /buːna/ 'coffee'.

=== Suprasegmentals ===
Chara has phonemic stress. Examples: /ˈbakʼa/ 'to slap', /baˈkʼa/ 'empty'; /ˈwoja/ 'to come', /woˈja/ 'wolf'.

=== Morphophonemics ===
Morpheme-initial nasals assimilate point of articulation to that of the preceding consonant, usually found when verbs are suffixed with the singular imperative morpheme /-na/, e.g. /dub-na/ "to hit.imp" → [dubma] 'hit!'.

== Grammar ==
=== Morphology ===
Chara generally uses noun case suffixes and postpositions.

Nouns are inflected for gender, number, definiteness, case, and possession. These are all suffixes, except for the possessive.

Gender pairs are usually lexical, except for a few with /-i/ in the masculine and /-a/ in the feminine. Examples:

/mansa/ 'ox', /mija/ 'cow'
/izi/ 'he', /iza/ 'she'

Nouns and adjectives inflect for plural with the suffix /-eːndi/. Examples:

/ina/ 'mother', /ineːndi/ 'mothers'
/dala/ 'while (sg.)', /daleːndi/ 'white (pl.)'

Definiteness in nouns is marked with the suffix /-naːzi/ (as an independent word meaning 'the male/man') for masculines and /-ena/ for feminines. Adjectives take /-bi/ in the masculine and /-ena/ in the feminine. Examples:

/mansa/ 'ox', /mansanaːzi/ 'the ox'
/mija/ 'cow', /mijena/ 'the cow/
/karta/ 'black', /kartabi/ 'the black (m.)', /kartena/ 'the black (f.)'

Nouns and adjectives may be marked for nominative, accusative, dative, genitive, ablative, instrumental, or vocative case. The nominative suffix is /-i/, accusative /-(i)s/, dative /-(i)ri/, genitive /-e/, ablative /-kaj/, instrumental /-ne/, and vocative /-o/.

Chara pronouns
Person		Independent		Possessive
Person		(s)	(pl)	(s)
1		/tani/	/noːne~nuni/	/tareri/
2		/neːni/	/inˈti/	/nereri/
3	(m)	/izi/	/itsendi/	/izeri/
3	(f)	/iza/		

Bound possessive pronouns: /ta-mija/ 'my cow', /ne-mija/ 'your cow', /iza-mija/ 'his cow'.

=== Syntax ===
Chara is a subject–object–verb language.

Adjectives end in /-a/ like nouns, and inflect for number, definiteness, plurality, and case. In noun phrases adjectives precede their nouns, and are not inflected.

== Examples ==
Numerals 1-10
Number	1	2	3	4	5	6	7	8	9	10
Chara	issa:	nanta:	keza:	obda:	uchcha	sa:fun	la:pun	nandirse	biza:	tantsa:
