= Kella =

Kella may refer to:

== People ==
- Kaisa Kella, Finnish figure skater
- Marjaana Kella (born 1961), Finnish photographer

== Places ==
- Kella, Ethiopia, town in East Gurage Zone, Ethiopia
- Kele, Ethiopia, town in Kore Zone, Ethiopia
- Kella, Florina, community in Greece.
- Kella, Thuringia, municipality in Thuringia Germany
