= Wolaytta language =

Omotic language spoken in Ethiopia

Wolaitta
- Wolayttatto Doonaa
- Native to: Ethiopia
- Region: Wolaita Zone of South Ethiopia
- Ethnicity: Welayta
- Native speakers: 2.7 million (2022)
- Language family: Afro-Asiatic: Omotic; North; Ometo; Central; Wolaitta
- Writing system: Latin taught in schools and Ethiopic script used by adults

Official status
- Official language in: Wolaita Zone

Language codes
- ISO 639-2: wal
- ISO 639-3: wal
- Glottolog: wola1242

Wolaitta or Wolayttatto Doonaa is a North Omotic language of the Ometo group of the Afroasiatic language family spoken in the Wolayita Zone and some other parts of southwestern Ethiopia. It is the native language of the Welayta people. The estimates of the population vary greatly because it is not agreed where the boundaries of the language are.

There are conflicting claims about how widely Wolaytta is spoken. Some hold that Melo, Oyda, and Gamo-Gofa-Dawro are also dialects, but most sources, including Ethnologue and ISO 639-3 now list these as separate languages. The different communities of speakers also recognize them as separate languages. A variety called Laha is said to be 'close' to Wolaytta in Hayward (1990) but listed as a distinct language by Blench; however, it is not included in Ethnologue.

Wolaytta has existed in written form since the 1940s, when the Sudan Interior Mission first devised a system for writing it. The writing system was later revised by a team led by Dr. Bruce Adams. They finished translating the New Testament in 1981 and the entire Bible in 2002. It was one of the first languages the Derg selected for their literacy campaign (1979–1991), before any other southern languages. Welaytta pride in their written language led to a fiercely hostile response in 1998 when the Ethiopian government distributed textbooks written in Wegagoda – an artificial language based on amalgamating Wolaytta with several closely related languages. As a result the textbooks in Wegagoda were withdrawn and teachers returned to ones in Wolaytta.

In speaking their language, the Wolaytta people use many proverbs. A large collection of them, in Ethiopian script, was published in 1987 (Ethiopian calendar) (Note: 1994/1995 Gregorian) by the Academy of Ethiopian Languages. Fikre Alemayehu's 2012 MA thesis from Addis Ababa University provides an analysis of Wolaytta proverbs and their functions.

== Lexical similarity with ==
- Gamo 79% to 93%
- Gofa 84%
- Dawro 80%
- Kullo 80%
- Dorze 80%
- Koorete 48%
- Male 43%

== Language status ==
The language is the official language in the Wolayita Zone of Ethiopia. Portions of the Bible were produced in 1934, the New Testament in 1981, and the entire Bible in 2002.

== Phonology ==
=== Consonants ===
Wakasa (2008) gives the following consonant phonemes for Wolaytta. (He also has mˀ, nˀ, lˀ, but these are consonant clusters, ⟨m7, n7, l7⟩.) Items in ⟨graphemes⟩ show the Latin alphabet, where this differs from the IPA:

		Labial	Dental	Palatal (-alveolar)	Velar	Glottal
Nasal		m	n			
Plosive/ Affricate	tenuis	p	t	tʃ ⟨ch⟩	k	ʔ ⟨7, '⟩
Plosive/ Affricate	ejective	pʼ ⟨ph⟩	tʼ ⟨x⟩, ɗ (?) ⟨dh⟩	tʃʼ ⟨c⟩	kʼ ⟨q⟩	
Plosive/ Affricate	voiced	b	d	dʒ ⟨j⟩	ɡ	
Fricative	voiceless		s	ʃ ⟨sh⟩		h, h̃ ⟨nh⟩
Fricative	voiced		z	ʒ ⟨zh⟩		
Approximant			l	j ⟨y⟩	w	
Rhotic			r			

Three consonants require further discussion:

- Wakasa (2008:96f) reports that the use of ⟨7⟩ for the glottal stop has been replaced by the use of the apostrophe ⟨'⟩.
- The sound written ⟨nh⟩ is described by Wakasa (2008:44) as a 'nasalized glottal fricative'; it is said to be extremely rare, occurring in only one common noun, an interjection, and two proper names.
- The status of the sound written ⟨D⟩ is apparently in dispute; Adams (1983:48) and Lamberti & Sottile (1997:23, 25-26) claim that it is implosive, thus presumably [ɗ].Wakasa (2008:62) denies that this consonant is implosive, and calls it 'glottalized'.

=== Vowels ===
Wolaytta has five vowels, which appear both long and short:

	Front		Central		Back	
	short	long	short	long	short	long
Close	i	iː			u	uː
Mid	e	eː			o	oː
Open			a	aː		

== Grammar ==
=== Word order ===
Like other Omotic languages, the Wolaytta language has the basic word order SOV (subject–object–verb), as shown in the following example (Wakasa 2008:1041):

na7-ái 7iss-í maxááp-aa shamm-íis.
child-NOM.M.SG. one-OBL. book-ABS.M.SG. buy-PF.3M.SG.
"The boy bought a book."

It has postpositional phrases, which precede the verb (Wakasa 2008:1042):

ta-7ish-ái maxááp-aa ba-lágg-iya-ppe tall7-íis.
my-brother-NOM.M.SG. book-ABS.M.SG. his:own-friend-OBL.M.SG.-from borrow-PF.3M.SG.
"My brother borrowed a book from his friend."

Nouns used adjectivally precede the nouns that they modify (Wakasa 2008:1044)

ló77-o dé7-uwa de7-áis.
good-OBL life-ABS.M.SG live-IMPF.1SG.
"I live a good life."

Numerals precede the nouns that they quantify over (Wakasa 2008:1045)

na7-ái naa77-ú mácc-a 7as-atá be7-íis.
child-NOM.M.SG two-OBL female-OBL people-ABS.PL see-PF.3M.SG.
"The boy saw two women."

== See also ==
- Welayta people
