= Bosha language =

Extinct Omotic language of Ethiopia

Garo
- Bosha
- Native to: Ethiopia
- Region: Kingdom of Garo
- Extinct: after 19th century
- Language family: Afro-Asiatic: Omotic; North; Gonga; Kafa–Shekkacho; Kafa?; Garo

Language codes
- ISO 639-3: (included in Kafa [kbr])
- Glottolog: bosh1241

Garo, also known as Bosha after the Bosha dynasty, is an extinct Omotic language of Ethiopia. Ethnologue lists it as a dialect of the Northern Omotic Kafa language, but notes that it may be a distinct language. Other sources list it as unclassified. A few rememberers could be found in the 1970s. The Kingdom of Garo was a culturally Gonga enclave within the southern Oromo area.
