= Basketo language =

Omotic language spoken in Ethiopia

Basketo
- ባስኬ፟ት (Basket)
- Native to: Ethiopia
- Ethnicity: Basketo
- Native speakers: 93,000 (2007 census)
- Language family: Afro-Asiatic: Omotic; North Omotic; Ometo; North; Basketo
- Dialects: Dokko; Dollo
- Writing system: Ge'ez

Language codes
- ISO 639-3: bst
- Glottolog: bask1236
- ELP: Basketo

Basketo (also known as Basketto, Baskatta, Mesketo, Misketto, and Basketo-Dokka) is an Omotic language spoken in the Basketo special woreda of the Southern Nations, Nationalities, and Peoples Region, which is part of Ethiopia. The speakers refer to the language as "Masketo", while their neighbors refer to it as "Basketo." It has said to consist of two dialects, "Doko" (Dokko) and "Dollo" (Dollo). Besides their mother tongue, some also speak Melo, Oyda, Galila, or Gofa.

== See also ==
- Basketo people
