= Koore Zone =

Zone in the South Ethiopia Regional State

Coordinates: 5°50′N 37°50′E

Koore Zone ኮሬ ዞን
- Zone
- Country: Ethiopia
- Region: South Ethiopia Regional State
- Seat: Kelle

Government
  - Chief administrator: Million Desalegn (AP) (Prosperity Party)
- Time zone: UTC+3 (East Africa Time)
- Area code: (+251) 16
- Website: Koore Zone Government Communication Affairs Departure

Map of the regions and zones of Ethiopia

Koore Zone, (Amharic: ኮሬ ዞን) is a zone in the South Ethiopian Regional State, Ethiopia. The people in the zone are called Koore, and their language is Koorete. Koore Zone got zonal status in August 2023 upon the formation of the South Ethiopia Regional State. In 2011, the Segen Area Peoples Zone was established, which includes former Dirashe special woreda, Konso special woreda, Burji special and Amaro special woreda. Located in the Great Rift Valley, Koore Zone is bordered on the south by Burji Zone, on the southwest by Konso Zone, on the west by Gardula Zone, on the northwest by Gamo Zone and Lake Chamo, and on the north by Lake Abaya and in east and northeast by Oromia Region. It is divided into 35 kebeles. The administrative center of the Koore Zone is Kelle. Dano, Nechsar and Kereda Towns are other growing municipals of the zone. The highest peak in the zone is Mount Dello (3600 meters), which is part of the Koore mountains, the highest in Jemjem plateau and the second from the region. Much of the western part of this zone lies inside the (Enee Shanka) Nechisar National Park. The major crops grown in Korso are enset (Enset ventricosum), teff, maize, wheat, barley, navy beans, and coffee. Korso has 39 kilometers of all-weather roads and 16 kilometers of dry-weather roads, for an average road density of 36 kilometers per 1000 square kilometers. The Central Statistical Agency (CSA) reported that 1,082 tons of coffee were produced in the year ending in 2005, based on inspection records from the Ethiopian Coffee and Tea authority. This represented 0.48% of the Southern Nations, Nationalities and Peoples' Region (SNNPR)'s output and 1.08% of Ethiopia's total output.

This zone was selected as one of the three areas for Agri-Service Ethiopia to implement an Integrated Food Security Program. This Program operates in 10 of the woreda's kebeles, with the goal of improving agricultural practices, developing new rural water sources, and maintain and improve the existing local schools.

Koore is well known and rich by yearly overflowing rivers. Bewaye, Sarmale (Segen), Duano, Sooqeyndo Kondilcho, Baala and Magga are some of them. with the time now, due to the number of the people are increasing in alarming rate and the societies facing many challenges.

== Demographics ==
Based on the 2007 Census conducted by the Central Statistical Agency of Ethiopia (CSA), this zone has a total population of 1,700,000 of whom 1,000,000are men and 7,00,000 women. With an area of 1,522.16 square kilometers, Amaro has a population density of 104.93; 8,633 or 5.78% are urban inhabitants. A total of 28,969 households were counted in this zone, which results in an average of 5.15 persons to a household, and 27,941 housing units. The largest ethnic group reported in Amaro was the Koore people (97.8%); all other ethnic groups made up 2.2% of the population. Koorete language was spoken as a first language by 97.36% of the inhabitants, and 1.28% spoke Amharic; the remaining 1.36% spoke all other primary languages reported. 87.76% of the population said they were Protestants, 6.12% practiced Ethiopian Orthodox Christianity, 2.78% practiced traditional beliefs, 1.84% were Catholics, and 1.14% were Muslim.

In the 1994 Census this zone had a population of 98,315 in 19,060 households, of whom 49,277 were men and 49,038 women; 3,059 or 3.11% of its population were urban dwellers. The two largest ethnic groups reported in Amaro were the Koore people (93.11%), and the Amhara (0.8%); all other ethnic groups made up 6.19% of the population. Koorete language was spoken as a first language by 97.79% of the inhabitants, 0.82% spoke Oromigna, and 0.82% spoke Amharic; the remaining 0.57% spoke all other primary languages reported. 51.63% of the population said they were Protestants, 35.46% practiced traditional religions, and 10.38% practiced Ethiopian Orthodox Christianity. Concerning education, 22.76% of the population were considered literate; 10.54% of children aged 7–12 were in primary school; 1.32% of the children aged 13–14 were in junior secondary school, and 0.84% of the inhabitants aged 15–18 were in senior secondary school. Concerning sanitary conditions, about 36% of the urban houses and 9% of all houses had access to safe drinking water at the time of the census; 60% of the urban and 10% of the total had toilet facilities.
