= Zala language =

Omotic language of Gamo-Gofa, Ethiopia

Zala
- Native to: Gamo-Gofa, Ethiopia
- Region: Zala, on the Maze River (cf. Maze National Park)
- Language family: Afro-Asiatic: Omotic; North Omotic; Ometo; North; Zala

Language codes
- ISO 639-3: None (mis)
- Glottolog: zala1240

Zala is a variety of the Ometo languages spoken in Gamo-Gofa Zone, Ethiopia. There is little information on it. It may be a dialect of Wolaitta, Gofa, or a distinct language in the central Ometo dialect continuum.
