= Koorete =

Koorete may refer to:

- the Koorete people
- the Koorete language
