= Maale =

Maale can mean:

- Maale, Maldives, the capital of the Maldives
- the Male people, an ethnic group in Ethiopia, and
- the Male language, the language of the Male people
