= Koore people =

Ethnic group in Ethiopia

Koore
Regions with significant populations
- Ethiopia

Languages
- Koorete, Amharic

The Koore (also known as the Koorete) are an ethnic group whose homeland lies in southern Ethiopia.

== Overview ==
The, Koore are found in what was formerly called the Amaro special woreda and currently Koore Zone, which is east of the Abaya and Chamo Lakes; the vast majority of this ethnic group live there. Other members of this group live in the Gamo Zone, Burji Zone and the western part of Guji Zone in Oromia Region. The language of the Koore, Koorete, belongs to East Ometo Language sub-family with Kachama-Ganjule and Zayse. It is the only Ometo language east of Lake Abaya.

The Koore are people of enset culture. Enset, which is cultivated in all the three agro-ecological zones (Dega, Weina-dega, and qola), is the main staple food of Koore. Pea, wheat, barley, cabbage, lentil, bean, and onion in dega; maize, teff and sorghum in weina-dega and qolla are largely grown for sale and for consumption. Livestock is also an important economic activity in Amaro. Coffee, chat, chili, lemon and bull'a (a fine by-product of enset) are the main cash crops in Amaro. Of course, Amaro coffee has the best quality comparable to the famous Yirgacheffe brand, and nowadays it is exported to over 50 countries of the world. Koore people are also known for their traditional irrigation system before 300 years. Terrace agriculture is also practiced, though not as intensively as amongst the Konso people.

== History ==
The Koore are believed to have emigrated from Gamo highlands in the middle of the 14th century.But accurately Some informants also say a group of people emigrated, as Christian missionaries from Manz, Shewa Amhara to Amaro (also called KorUso by the Koore) via Dawuro and Gamo between the middle of the 14th century and the beginning of the 15th century.

There were many dispersed and unified indigenous Oma (clan) in Koorso when these emigrants came to Amaro (KorUso). The new emigrants fought with these indigenous tribes and eventually forced some of them to fly to Burji, Konso and Derashe. The remaining indigenous tribes were intermingled with the newcomers to form a people of new identity, the Koore.

The emigrants who were assimilated with indigenous tribes were said to have carried with them tabot (Ark of the Covenant) and are believed to have founded some Orthodox churches including Yero Medhane Alem, Icha Giorgis, and Darba Manana Michael. Eventually the Kingdom of Amarro was established at about the end of the 14th century with 23 administrative units or districts called daynete. Since its establishment, the Kingdom of Amaro was ruled by kaates or kings (Awoke, 1985). Oral informants say, imam Ahmed (locally called "llusa") invaded the Kingdom of Amaro (Koruso) in the 16th century, burning its churches and persecuting the Christians.

Generally there were 19 kings from three dynasties in Koruso from the middle of the 14th century to the incorporation of the kingdom into the Ethiopian Empire by Ras Leul Seged, general of Menelik II, in 1896. After its incorporation into the Ethiopian Empire, Amaro was organized as a woreda, with its administrative center first at Qerchele, then at Dano, and finally at Kele, but before that it was organized in to two sub-woredas. This woreda lasted until 1981 E.C., when Amaro woreda was partitioned between Gedeo and Gamo-Gofa. After the military regime of Derg was toppled in 1991 by the Ethiopian People's Revolutionary Democratic Front, Amaro was re-established as a special woreda Administration under the Southern Nations Nationalities and Peoples Region.

=== Political structure ===
It had been mentioned above that Koore had a kingdom led by Kaates, or kings. The kingdom was/is divided between 23 administrative units, daynetes. These 23 daynetes were/are accountable to two awajjos, the highest dignitaries under the Kaate. Appointed district administrators, dayna, ran the actual daily administration and judiciary functions of the daynetes. Under each dayna were four offices: usha, maaga, tora maaga and mura. Tora maaga was a war leader and mura was a lower village chief or announcer of information and proclamation (Awoke, 1985).

The two awajjos, called Yero Awajjo and Aykure Awajjo, mostly had advisory functions though they had higher political and social status compared to the daynas below them. Conflicts that arose between two districts or daynetes were solved by awajjos before they went to the court of the Kaate. Kaates had/have advisors called bulatene. These advisors also consulted the awajjos and the daynas. Besides these there were palace guards, traditional army called solle, who were accountable only to the Kaate. Kaates were/are believed to be God anointed. Besides their political power, they were/are also believed to be rainmakers. However, they are not religious chiefs.

Generally, though this traditional political system ceased to function properly after the Kingdom of Koore was incorporated into the Ethiopian Empire in 1896, it still has largely functional side by side with the modern administrative structure. Still the Koore honor their Kaate as their traditional leader. (Awoke 1985)

== Culture and religion ==
=== Marriage ===
The Koore are polygamous and exogamous. As mentioned earlier, the Koorese and Kana'e marry to each other. This partly makes the Koore exogamous. On the other hand, however, some Koorese clans also intermarry within the tribe or group and this disqualifies Koore exogamy. The reason for this seems that many clans in Koorese do not establish a common genealogical descent. Except for a very few exceptions, the clans in Kana'e claim common genealogy from a single father, Wojjo, who is believed to be the founding father of the first Koore (Amarro) Kingdom. However, as the tribal name Wojjo is a widely spread generic tribal name in many Omotic people, a common ancestry claim of Kana'e tribe/group from Wojjo is doubtful.

Generally, Koore have five types of marriage arrangements: arranged marriage, abduction, baale (marriage by sudden appearance and obligation of a girl's family), levirate marriage, and mishira (secondary marriage, usually practiced by widows or divorced couples). Generally omen interpretation is very important in marriage arrangement as well as other social life.

In the recent past, the dowry price paid for a girl's family in Koore society was only symbolic and had the purpose of strengthening affinial relationship. Currently, however, the amount of dowry payment is becoming extraordinarily high to become serious social problem. Virginity has a high social value in Koore society. If a girl is not a virgin, she will be considered an adulteress and is beaten by her husband. The community does not give the girl due respect and her families are also humiliated.

=== Birth, status of children and gender ===
A Koore prefers to have a son to a female. When a female bears a child, people who come to visit her first ask her what sex she bore. Her answer is symbolic: she says, "I have yele", meaning a 'human being' or "mumme," meaning a 'solid' if she bore a son. On the other hand, if she bore a female she says, "I have ogatse", meaning a 'traveler', or "kana", meaning 'a dog' or 'zelo', meaning 'a wooden bowl'. A son stays at his father and ancestor's place, hence 'solid' at his ancestral land. A female marries and goes to permanently live with her husband's family, hence "ogatse", traveler, or "kana" ('dog') that roams from place to place.

=== Religion ===
The Supreme God of Koore is called Wonto. Wonto is the creator of earth, the water, the sun, the stars, human beings, etc., and the whole universe. As Simon (2002) says, the term Wonto has connotative meaning: day or light. Thus, day and light symbolizes the identity of God (Wonto) for the Koore. However, as Wonto is far away from people, ancestral spirits (ade/akko), possession spirits (tsooze) and laaha (soothsayer) are believed to be mediators between Wonto and human beings. Due to this, family, clan or regional heads make many forms of sacrificial rituals for ancestral spirits and possession spirits.

On the other hand, as mentioned earlier, Christianity has a long history in Amaro. The first Ethiopian Orthodox churches, established during the 14th century, were Yero Medhane Alem Monastery and Icha Giorgis and Derba Michael churches. As Koore oral tradition says Christian immigrants who were believed to have come from Menz through Kafa, Dawaro and Gamo to Amaro were responsible to establish these Churches. However, during the wars of imam Ahmed the churches were burned and the Christians were persecuted recklessly. The remaining few Christians and priests were forced to flee to Birbir Mariam in Gamo, and other places. It is said that after this historical incidence the Koore people relapsed to their old traditional religion and remained so until the Ethiopian Empire builders reintroduced Christianity in the 19th century.

This time, however, Christianity could not spread rapidly and could not have many followers because the re-introduction of Christianity was related with subjugation of the northern feudal empire builders. Thus, the Orthodox influence remained minimal until the Evangelical Christianity was introduced to Amarro in the 1950s. Currently most of the Koore are followers of different Protestant sects.

Generally, there are complex situations regarding Christianity (either Orthodox or Evangelical) in Koore society today. As Simon (2002) says ".... The people regarded Orthodox Christianity as foreign Amhara religion that was added by the dominant Amhara to be worshipped..." Though Orthodox Christianity itself is highly synchronized with traditional religion, it " ...insisted that putting aside all their traditional practices was a prerequisite to become a Christian. Due to this, every part of Koore culture is seen as useless and demonic." On the other hand, though Evangelical Christianity is currently dominant and widely spread its disregard for Koore culture and its deculturation of Koore is being felt negatively. Simon continues "The Evangelicals, on the other hand, are completely negative to Koore culture and they reject every part of Koore culture as demonic ... In other words, to Evangelical Churches, becoming Christian means abandoning their culture. This ends with deculturation."

=== Death rituals ===
Life from birth to death and life after death is a continuous process for Koore. For the Koore, death does not mean the end of life; rather, a deceased person continues to exist in the realm of the unseen world as ancestor. The spirit of the deceased ancestor could be a nice ancestor concerned for his living lineage; or it could be a bad spirit called sahase, gomatse or moitile that could inflict danger on its living relatives. Because of this believe the Koore have successive death rituals to appease the dead person. The death rite starts with burial ceremony.

The first ritual after burial is called isha gelse, meaning 'bringing back the spirit of the dead person', and starts 40 days after burial of the deceased person. Up to 40 days the spirit of the deceased person is believed to roam around his ex-living home and garden. The spirit of the dead is highly feared in these days. For the ritual of isha gelse the eldest son of the deceased person, the head of the clan of the deceased person and a tenquay or soothsayer, take fresh milk and flour of different grains and go to the grave of the deceased person. The tenquay, who is believed to have a divine power to communicate with the spirit of the deceased person, sprinkles the milk and the food on the grave. The spirit of the deceased person is believed to come towards the tenquay to take the food and the milk. At this moment the tenquay grabs the spirit and takes it back to his ex-home.

This is followed by another ritual called leemo epe, necromancy, in the ex-house of the deceased person. Many people gather into the ex-house of the deceased person to attend this ritual. The tenquay who brought the spirit back to his ex-house begins to "talk" with the spirit, leemo, and translates what the leemo says to the gathered people. This ritual can last from few days to weeks as far as there is enough food to feed the gathered people. Generally the purpose of these rituals is to know the case of the person's death. On the other hand, a died person is believed to live in the world of truth; that is with Wonto, God. So the gathered people consult the spirit about the wellbeing of his family and the society as a whole in the future. They also consult him what actions to take in order to avoid drought, epidemic disease, natural catastrophe, etc. After the ritual of leemo concluded, the living relatives of the deceased person occasionally offer sacrifices of milk, wheat flour mixed with enset bull’a or livestock to the ancestral spirit/spirits.

== Historical and religious heritages and tourist attractions ==
As mentioned above, Yero Medhane Alem Monastery is an important historical and religious site related to Koore origin and identity. Besides these, Waalo tsabala, Wallo Hot Spring (Kaati Tsabala or King's spring), a natural hot spring in Nechisar National Park are considered sacred forests/sites. Sites such as Yeero Wala, Sagane Shashe, Gumure Ooshe and Gudena are sacred historic as well as religious. In addition, there is Mount Delo and its natural forest, Goona Biddo (a standing pole of King Goona) and Gomale, the sacred burial site of Koore Kings (especially kings of Inkalo Dynasty), are important sacred historic relics of Koore. Many sacred ancestral clan cemeteries, boosa, and naturally revered forests, such as Wunquro Wora, Sheffo Wora and Gani Wora are also important historic as well as cultural relics.

== Sources ==
- Awoke Amzaye. 2007. Mosaic Cultures and Peoples’ of Southern Nations, Nationalities and Peoples’ Regional State.
- Awassa, Ethiopia: Bureau of Information and Culture
