= Dollo =

Dollo may refer to:

== People ==
- Benny Dollo (born 1950), Indonesian football coach
- Louis Dollo (1857–1931), Belgian palaeontologist

== Other uses ==
- Dollo Zone, Ethiopia
- Dollo, a dialect of the Basketo language
