= KCX =

KCX may refer to:

- KC-X, a United States Air Force program
- kcx, the ISO 639-3 code for the Kachama-Ganjule language
- Kyra Cooney-Cross, an Australian soccer player
