= Richard Hayward =

Richard Hayward may refer to:

- Richard Hayward (sculptor) (1725–1800) British sculptor
- Richard Hayward (Florida politician), one of the mayors of Tallahassee, Florida
- Richard Hayward (actor) (1892–1964), Irish film actor, writer and musician
- Richard Hayward (cricketer) (1954–2026), English cricketer
- Richard Hayward (linguist) (born 1937), professor of linguistics
- Richard Arthur Hayward (born 1947), tribal chairman of the Mashantucket Pequot Tribe
- Richie Hayward (1946–2010), drummer in the band Little Feat
- Rick Hayward (born 1952), British businessman

== See also ==
- Rick Hayward (ice hockey) (born 1966), Canadian ice hockey player
