= Dorze =

Dorze may refer to:

- the Dorze people
- the Dorze language
