= Kafa language =

North Omotic language spoken in Ethiopia

Kafa
- Kafi noono
- Native to: Ethiopia
- Region: Keffa Zone
- Ethnicity: Kafficho
- Native speakers: 830,000 (2007 census)
- Language family: Afro-Asiatic: Omotic; North; Gonga; Kafa–Shekkacho; Kafa
- Dialects: Bosha

Language codes
- ISO 639-3: kbr
- Glottolog: kafa1242

Kafa or Kefa (Kafi noono) is a North Omotic language spoken in Ethiopia at the Keffa Zone. It is part of the Ethiopian Language Area, with SOV word order, ejective consonants, etc.

A collection of proverbs in the language has been published by Mesfin Wodajo.

== Phonology ==
=== Consonants ===
| | | Labial | | Alveolar | | Palatal | | Velar | | Glottal |
| | | plain | gem. | plain | gem. | plain | gem. | plain | gem. | Glottal |
|---|---|---|---|---|---|---|---|---|---|---|
| Plosive/ Affricate | voiceless | p | pː | t | tː | tʃ | tʃː | k | kː | ʔ |
| Plosive/ Affricate | voiced | b | bː | d | dː | dʒ | dʒː | g | ɡː | |
| Plosive/ Affricate | ejective | pʼ | pːʼ | tʼ | tːʼ | tʃʼ | tʃːʼ | kʼ | kːʼ | |
| Fricative | voiceless | f | | s | sː | ʃ | | | | h |
| Fricative | voiced | | | z | | | | | | |
| Nasal | | m | mː | n | nː | | | | | |
| Rhotic | | | | ɾ | | | | | | |
| Approximant | | w | | l | lː | j | | | | |

- /f/ may also be heard as [ɸ] in free variation.
- /b/ can be heard as a bilabial approximant [β̞] in intervocalic positions.
- /t/ can be realized as [ts] in word-final position.

=== Vowels ===
| | Front | Back |
|---|---|---|
| Close | i iː | u uː |
| Mid | ɛ ɛː | ɔ ɔː |
| Open | a aː | |

- /a/ may also have an allophone of [ə].

== Manjo ==
Manjo
- Mangiò
- (speculative)
- Native to: Ethiopia
- Ethnicity: Manjo
- Extinct: (date missing)
- Language family: unattested

Language codes
- ISO 639-3: None (mis)
- Glottolog: mang1364

Within the Kafa culture there is a caste of traditional hunters called the Manja/Manjo 'hunters'. They may once have spoken a different language. However, Leikola has shown that currently they speak Kafa with a number of distinctive words and constructions that they use, reinforcing the distinctions between themselves and the larger Kafa society.
