= Richard Hayward (linguist) =

British linguist (born 1937)

Richard John Hayward, FBA (born 1937), often known as Dick Hayward, is a linguist and retired academic. He is emeritus professor of Ethiopian linguistic studies at the School of Oriental and African Studies.

== Career ==
Born in 1937, Hayward attended the University of London, graduating with a Bachelor of Science degree in 1958 and completing a Doctor of Philosophy degree in 1976.

Hayward taught at a school in Yorkshire from 1968 to 1971, before being employed as a lecturer in linguistics at the School of Oriental and African Studies from 1971; promoted to reader in phonology in 1988, he was subsequently appointed professor of Ethiopian linguistic studies and gave his inaugural lecture in 1994. He retired in 2002 and was appointed emeritus professor of Ethiopian linguistic studies.

In 1987, Hayward was elected a fellow of the British Academy, the United Kingdom's national academy for the humanities and social sciences.

== Publications ==
- The Arbore Language: A First Investigation, Including a Vocabulary, Kuschitische Sprachstudies, 2 (Hamburg: H. Buske, 1984). ISBN 978-3-87118-647-9
- (with Enid M. Parker) An Afar–English–French Dictionary: With Grammatical Notes in English (London: School of Oriental and African Studies, 1985). ISBN 978-0-7286-0124-6
- (editor) Omotic Language Studies (London: School of Oriental and African Studies, 1990). ISBN 978-0-7286-0166-6
- The Challenge of Omotic: An Inaugural Lecture Delivered on 17 February 1994 (London: School of Oriental and African Studies, 1995). ISBN 978-0-7286-0249-6
- (with Eshetu Chabo) Gamo–English–Amharic Dictionary: With an Introductory Grammar of Gamo (Wiesbaden: Harrassowitz Verlag, 2014). ISBN 978-3-447-10109-7

== Personal life ==
Outside of his career in linguistics, Hayward has made significant contributions to the cultivation of ferns in the UK. In 2005, Hayward was the first recipient of an Exotic Fern Group Special Award.
