= Shinasha =

Shinasha may refer to:

- Shinasha people of Ethiopia
- Shinasha language
