= Gonga languages =

Gonga
- Kefoid
- Geographic distribution: Ethiopia
- Linguistic classification: Afro-Asiatic: Omotic; North; Gonga
- Subdivisions: Anfillo; Boro (Shinasha); Kafa–Shekkacho

Language codes
- Glottolog: gong1256

The Gonga languages, or Kefoid languages, belong to the Afro-Asiatic family and are spoken in Ethiopia. As of present, the Kafacho (southwestern Ethiopia), Shekkacho (southwestern Ethiopia), Boro Shinasha (northwestern Ethiopia), Anfillo (western Ethiopia) are the speakers of the Gonga languages. Bosha is extinct. The people were living together some 400 years ago, and because of different social, environmental, economic and political factors they disintegrated by migrating to their respective current places.
