= Exotic Fern Group =

- Abbreviation: EFG
- Type: Membership organization
- Purpose: A community for enthusiasts of tropical, subtropical and indoor ferns
- Headquarters: Milton Keynes
- President: Dr Peter Blake
- Website: exoticferngroup.org

The Exotic Fern Group (EFG) is an international plant society that is a community for enthusiasts of tropical, subtropical, and indoor ferns. Founded in 2021, the group supports fern horticulture, conservation and botanical study worldwide, and publishes the annual journal The Glasshouse. It is a partner plant society of the Royal Horticultural Society and holds institutional membership with Botanic Gardens Conservation International.

== Purpose and activities ==
The Exotic Fern Group promotes the cultivation, study and conservation of tropical and subtropical fern species. Its activities include providing horticultural guidance, supporting the exchange of information among members and encouraging interest in the botany, taxonomy and ecology of exotic ferns. The group organises lectures, workshops and garden visits, and participates in horticultural shows and exhibitions in the United Kingdom and abroad.

== Publications ==
The group publishes The Glasshouse ISSN 2977-2117, an annual journal featuring articles on the cultivation of exotic ferns in domestic, glasshouse and outdoor environments. The journal includes material on horticulture, taxonomy, conservation and related botanical topics, with contributions from both amateur growers and specialists.

== Affiliations ==
The Exotic Fern Group is a partner plant society of the Royal Horticultural Society. It also holds institutional membership with Botanic Gardens Conservation International, reflecting its engagement with global plant conservation initiatives. Before becoming independent in 2024, the group operated as a Special Interest Group of the British Pteridological Society.

== Awards and recognition ==
The society presents occasional awards recognising contributions to fern cultivation, conservation or research. Its first special recognition award was issued in 2025 to Richard Hayward, for the contribution he has made to tropical fern culture, at an event at Treborth Botanic Garden. Eminent pteridologist Christopher Fraser-Jenkins is the Exotic Fern Group's honorary patron.

The EFG also participates in public horticultural events. In May 2025, members of the group presented a display at the Hethersett Plant Fair. Its display stand at BBC Gardeners’ World Live, held at the National Exhibition Centre in Birmingham, received a gold award in June 2025.
