= Dime language =

Endangered Omotic language of Ethiopia

Dime
- Native to: Ethiopia
- Region: Debub (South) Omo Zone
- Native speakers: 11,000 (2007 census)
- Language family: Afro-Asiatic: Omotic; South Omotic; Dime

Language codes
- ISO 639-3: dim
- Glottolog: dime1235
- ELP: Dimé

Dime or Dima is an Afro-Asiatic language spoken in the northern part of the Selamago district in the Southern Nations, Nationalities and Peoples Region (SNNP) of Ethiopia, around Mount Smith. Dime divides into at least two dialects, which include Us'a and Gerfa. It has six case suffixes in addition to an unmarked nominative. It is overwhelmingly suffixing, but uses prefixes for demonstratives and has reduplication. Phonologically, it is noteworthy among the Omotic languages for having phonemic velar and uvular fricatives. The basic word order is subject–object–verb (SOV), as in other Omotic languages, and indeed in all members of the core of the Ethiopian Language Area.

The language, as well as the Dime people themselves, reportedly decreased in number over the 20th century due to predations from their neighbors the Bodi, and both are in danger of extinction. According to official Ethiopian figures, the 1994 census reported 6293 speakers of the Dime language in the SNNP region alone; in the 2007 census, only 574 speakers were reported for all of Ethiopia. Further, because the Dime language still lacks a writing system and there are no local schools to promote the use of the language, it is even more threatened.

== Phonology ==
=== Consonants ===
| | | Bilabial | Alveolar | Alveo-palatal | Velar | Uvular | Glottal |
|---|---|---|---|---|---|---|---|
| Nasals | | m | n | | | | |
| Plosives | Voiceless | p | t | | k | | |
| Plosives | Voiced | b | d | | g | | |
| Plosives | Ejective | p’ | t’ | | k’ | | ʔ |
| Plosives | Implosive | | ɗ | | | | |
| Fricatives | Voiceless | f | s | ʃ | x | χ | h |
| Fricatives | Voiced | | z | ʒ | ɣ | ʁ | |
| Fricatives | Ejective | | s’ | | | | |
| Affricates | Voiceless | | ts | tʃ | | | |
| Affricates | Voiced | | | dʒ | | | |
| Affricates | Ejective | | | tʃ’ | | | |
| Liquids | | | l | | | | |
| Liquids | | | r | | | | |
| Glides | | w | | j | | | |

=== Vowels ===
| | Front | Central | Back |
|---|---|---|---|
| Close | i | ɨ | U |
| Close-mid | e | | O |
| Open-mid | ɛ | ə | ɔ |
| Open | | a | |

=== Free variation ===
Dime undergoes phonological processes when speaking and one of them is free variation. Free variation is a phenomenon of two or more sounds or forms appearing in the same environment without a change in meaning and without being considered as wrong by a native speaker of Dime.

/h/ and /ʔ/ are in free variation word initially in some lexemes.

ʔˈalfe and halfe Knife
ʔˈaʁe and haʁe wood, knife
ʔààke and hààke to pick up
ʔaay and haay grass
yízí and hízí to run
yín or ʔín you (obj.)

=== Gemination ===
Dime has a lot of consonant gemination, which mostly occurs in the middle and final position of words, which distinguishes the meaning of lexemes.

túmú (deep) - túmmú (stomach)
ʔoloχ (quick) - ʔolloχ (slowly)
ʔane (hand) - ʔanne (wild life)

=== Syllable structure ===
Dime has both closed and open syllables as well as super-heavy syllables. Most consonants can occur in the middle and at the end of the word.

| Syllable shape | examples | translation |
|---|---|---|
| CV | ná | 'she' |
| CV | nú | 'he' |
| CVC | káf | 'wait' |
| CVC | lág | 'friend' |
| CVV | čúú | 'bottom' |
| CVV | loo.mú | 'lemon' |
| CVVC | neey | 'hunger' |
| CVVC | zuúb | 'red' |
| CVCC | gušš | 'nails' |
| CVCC | físt | mucu |
| CVCC | gɘrž | 'cat' |
| CVVCC | lóokk | |
| CVVCC | c’íížž | |

Dime also has consonant clusters, which are mostly made up of only two members.

At the end of the word:

gušš nails
físt sneeze
tálk borrow
sáánk floor
túss pillar

In the middle of the word:

dámpe tobacco
básumb fearful
gázde boundary
bedze out

== Morphology and Syntax ==
=== Definiteness ===
A definite noun is one which refers to a specific entity. Morphologically, Dime distinguishes definite from indefinite nouns. Definiteness is marked by the suffix -is.

ʔ́ehé a house - ʔ́éh-is the house
nîts a child - nîts-is the child
ʔiyýi a person - ʔiyýs-is the person

ʔámzi gúdúm-ind-is
woman tall-F-DEF
the tall woman

gúdúm-ub gǒst-is
tall man-DEF
the tall man

In the last example, there is a modifier in the noun phrase; the definite marker is suffixed to the modifier.

The definite marker -is may optionally be changed to -iz when followed by a voiced consonant.

ʔéh-is the house
gášš-is the road
ʔámz-iz the woman
zúùb-iz the red one

=== Number ===
Nouns and noun phrases make a distinction between singular and plural. Singular is morphologically unmarked, whereas plural is marked by the suffix -af. That a head noun is plural can be inferred from the morpheme -id, which is suffixed to a modifier.

ʔéh -áf-is
house -PL-DEF
the houses

dər -áf-is
goat -PL-DEF
the goats

guur -af-is
crocodile -PL-DEF
the crocodiles

=== Pronouns ===
Pronouns
| | | | Subject | | Object | |
|---|---|---|---|---|---|---|
| 1st person | singular | | ʔaté | I | ʔis-im | me |
| 1st person | plural | | wótú | we | won-im | us |
| 2nd person | singular | | yaay/yáye | you | yin-im | you |
| 2nd person | plural | | yesé | you all/you guys | yen-im | you all/you guys |
| 3rd person | singular | M | nú | he | kin-im | him |
| 3rd person | singular | F | ná | she | kon-im | her |
| 3rd person | plural | | kété | they | ken-im | them |
