= Ometo languages =

Omotic dialect cluster of Ethiopia

Ometo
- Geographic distribution: Ethiopia
- Linguistic classification: Afro-Asiatic: Omotic; North; Ometo
- Subdivisions: South; East; North

Language codes
- Glottolog: omet1238

The Ometo languages of Ethiopia are a dialect cluster of the Omotic family, generally accepted as part of the Afro-Asiatic language family. They include the most populous Omotic language, Wolaytta, with two million speakers. The languages have around 4 million speakers.

== Classification ==
Bender (2000) classifies them as,

- Northwest:
  - Welaitta Cluster: Wolaytta (Ometo), Dorze–Gamo-Gofa-Dawro
  - Melo (Malo)
  - Basketo
  - Oyda (Oyta)
  - Maale (Malé)
- Southeast: Gats'ame (Kachama-Ganjule), Koorete (Koyra, Harro), Zayse-Zergulla

Bender (2003) places Melo and the poorly documented Zala by lexical correspondences together with his "Welaitta Cluster".

Hayward (2003) prefers the terms "East Ometo" for Bender's Southeast, "North Ometo" for most of his Northwest, and leaves Maale as a third, Southern branch of Ometo proper.

Chara is left by Bender and Hayward as an outgroup, in a unit Bender calls "Macro-Ometo" and Hayward calls "Ometo-C'ara".
