= Marjaana Kella =

Finnish photographer (born 1961)

Marjaana Kella (born 1961) is a Finnish photographer.

== Early life and education ==
Kella was born in Orimattila, Finland. She was a student at the Free Art School from 1985 until 1986, and moved on to study photography at the University of Art and Design Helsinki from 1987 to 1993. In 2014 she received a Doctorate in photography from Alto University, her dissertation was entitled 'Translations - Landscape, the face and the presentation of the photograph.'

== Life and work ==
Kella has been teaching since the 1990s. She works on the MA program and is a Senior Lecturer in contemporary art and photography. In 2014 she was appointed vice-dean of the Academy of Fine Arts of the University of the Arts Helsinki.

Her photographic work reflects on the genre of portraiture, challenging its traditional composition to question identity, reality, and authenticity. Talking about her work, Marjaana Kella has stated "My photographs are kind of studies of perception and experience, or of the interface between people’s external and internal spaces."

The series Reversed (1996–1997) presents unusual portraits of individuals turning away from the camera, represented only by the back of their heads. The portraits, almost non-gestural, therefore ignore the subject's facial features to create pictorial, and textured compositions renewing the genre's aesthetic.

For Hypnosis (1997–2001) the artist scrutinises the suspended moment of hypnosis during which her subjects' effort at self-representation are disrupted.

== Solo exhibitions ==
- Marjaana Kella: Valokuvia, 1998, Photographic Gallery Hippolyte, Helsinki
- Marjaana Kella, 2001, Photographic Gallery Hippolyte, Helsinki
- People in hypnosis Marjaana Kella, 2002, 21 March – 21 April 2002, Van Zoetendaal, Amsterdam
- Solo Exhibition, 21 March – 1 May 2002, Van Zoetendaal, Amsterdam
- Solo Exhibition Marjaana Kella 26 May – 1 September 2002, Bildmuseet, Umeå
- Reversed Portraits, Poller Contemporary, 6 September – 31 October 2002, Frankfurt
- Solo Exhibition, 5 September – 21 December 2003, Museum of Photography, Helsinki
- Portraits, 2004, Galerie Fotohof, Salzburg
- Portraits, 13 May – 27 June 2004, Landesgalerie am Oberösterreichischen Landesmuseum, Linz
- Blush, 15 April – 21 May 2006, Van Zoetendaal, Amsterdam

== Publications ==
- Marjaana Kella. Van Zoetendaal, 2002. With text by Pia Sivenius and Jan Kaila. ISBN 9789075574227.
