= Kele, Ethiopia =

Kele
- Town
- Location in Ethiopia
- Coordinates: 06°05′N 38°02′E
- Country: Ethiopia
- Region: Southern Nations, Nationalities, and Peoples' Region
- Zone: Amaro
- Elevation: 4,672 ft (1,424 m)

Population (2007)
  - Total: 10,084

Kelle (ኬሌ) is a town in southern Ethiopia, and is the administrative center of the Amaro special woreda. Located in the Southern Nations, Nationalities, and Peoples Region southeast of Lake Abaya, this town has a latitude and longitude of 06°05′N 38°02′E with an altitude of 1424 meters above sea level. The name of this town, Kelle, comes from the Koorete word; its meaning is stone cave; the concept of kella as a customs used for terracing, beautification of areas, means to defend during war as a coverage. Kelle was established in 1941 Gc. This town is totally covered by beautiful mountains and attractive agro forestry. Lo'oynido and Bewaye are the water feeding rivers that crosses the town.

Kelle is located 202 km south of Awassa and 474 km south of Addis Ababa, 60 kilometers west from the main Awassa-Moyale highway. The infrastructure of the town is in progressive change. There is an automatic telephone service, postal office and banking services. In 2005 Kelle is connected to the main hydroelectric power line and now gets 24 hours of electricity service. Kelle has hospital, college, hotels, restaurants, shops, health centers, private drug stores schools and clean and potable waters. The hospitality of the local resident very attractive.

Based on figures from the Central Statistical Agency in 2007, Kelle has an estimated total population of 5,542 of whom 5,154 are men and 4,930 are women. The 1994 national census reported this town had a total population of 1,900 of whom 822 were men and 1,078 were women.

By 2018 the total numbers of residents are estimated 49,534.
