= Zayse-Zergulla language =

Afro-Asiatic language of Ethiopia

Zayse-Zergulla
- Native to: Ethiopia
- Region: Gamo Gofa region, west of Lake Chamo
- Native speakers: 19,000 (2007 census)
- Language family: Afro-Asiatic: Omotic; North; Ometo; East; Zayse-Zergulla
- Writing system: Ethiopic

Language codes
- ISO 639-3: zay
- Glottolog: zays1235
- ELP: Zaysé-Zergulla

Zayse-Zergulla is the combined title for the two closely related dialects of Zayse (also Zaysete, Zaisse, Zaysite, Zaysse) and Zergulla (or Zergula). The division may be more along ethnic or geographic lines than linguistic. It is an Afro-Asiatic Omotic language, and is spoken in the southwestern part of Ethiopia, to the immediate west of Lake Chamo. It is similar to the Gidicho dialect of the Koorete language.

For language examples, see Amha, Azeb. 2017. “Documentation of house-construction and terrace farming in Zargulla, an endangered Omotic language.” Endangered Languages Archive. Handle: http://hdl.handle.net/2196/196bdd35-3bdb-49aa-bd39-e1741ae69f95. Accessed on 17 October 2023

== Bibliography ==
- Hayward, Richard J. 1990. "Notes on the Zayse Language" in Omotic Language Studies. London: School of Oriental and African Studies, University of London. pp. 210–355.
