= Charles A. Ferguson =

American linguist (1921–1998)

Charles Albert Ferguson (July 6, 1921 – September 2, 1998) was an American linguist who taught at Stanford University. He was one of the founders of sociolinguistics and is best known for his work on diglossia. The TOEFL test was created under his leadership at the Center for Applied Linguistics in Washington, DC. Ferguson was also the leader of a team of linguists in Ethiopia under the Ford Foundation's Survey of Language Use and Language Teaching. One of the many publications that came out of this was his article proposing the Ethiopian Language Area (Ferguson 1976), an article that has become widely cited and an important milestone in the study of contact linguistics.

Ferguson is best known for his seminal article on diglossia, published in 1959 and (reprinted since then in other publications) and frequently cited by others, listed by Google Scholar as having been cited over 9,000 times.

Ferguson was also a major figure in the study of child phonology and led the Stanford Child Phonology Project from 1967 until 1990.

He was honored with a two-volume collection of papers in a 1986 Festschrift, edited by Joshua A. Fishman and others.

In 1952 he served on the Advisory Committee on Arabic and Persian Names, a committee established by the United States Board on Geographic Names.

== Life and education ==
Charles Albert Ferguson was born in Philadelphia, Pennsylvania in 1921. He had an early curiosity for language, system, and order which led him to explore foreign languages through Oriental Studies at the University of Pennsylvania (BA 1942, MA 1943 with a thesis on the Moroccan Arabic Verb; PhD 1945 with a dissertation on Standard Colloquial Bengali).

== Writings by Ferguson ==
- Ferguson, Charles A. 1959. Diglossia. Word 15: 325-340.
- Ferguson, Charles. 1976. The Ethiopian Language Area. Language In Ethiopia, ed. by M. Lionel Bender, J. Donald Bowen, R.L. Cooper, Charles A. Ferguson, pp. 63–76. Oxford: Oxford University Press.
- Ferguson, Charles. 1983. Reduplication in Child Phonology. Journal of Child Language 10:239-243.
- Ferguson, Charles. 1988. Agreement in Natural Language. Stanford: Center for the Study of Language and Information.

== Writings about Ferguson ==
- Croft, William. "Obituary: Joseph Harold Greenberg." Language 77, no. 4 (2001): 815-830.
- Fishman, Joshua. 2000. "Obituary: Charles A. Ferguson, 1921-1998: An Appreciation," Journal of Sociolinguistics 4/1: 121-128.
- Huebner, Thom. 1999. "Obituary Charles Albert Ferguson". Language in Society 28: 431-437.
