= Karo language (Ethiopia) =

South Omotic language spoken in southwestern Ethiopia

Karo
- Native to: Ethiopia
- Region: South Omo Region
- Native speakers: 1,500 (2007 census)
- Language family: Afro-Asiatic: Omotic; Aroid; Hamer–Karo; Hamer–Banna; Karo

Language codes
- ISO 639-3: kxh
- Glottolog: karo1297
- ELP: Karo (Ethiopia)

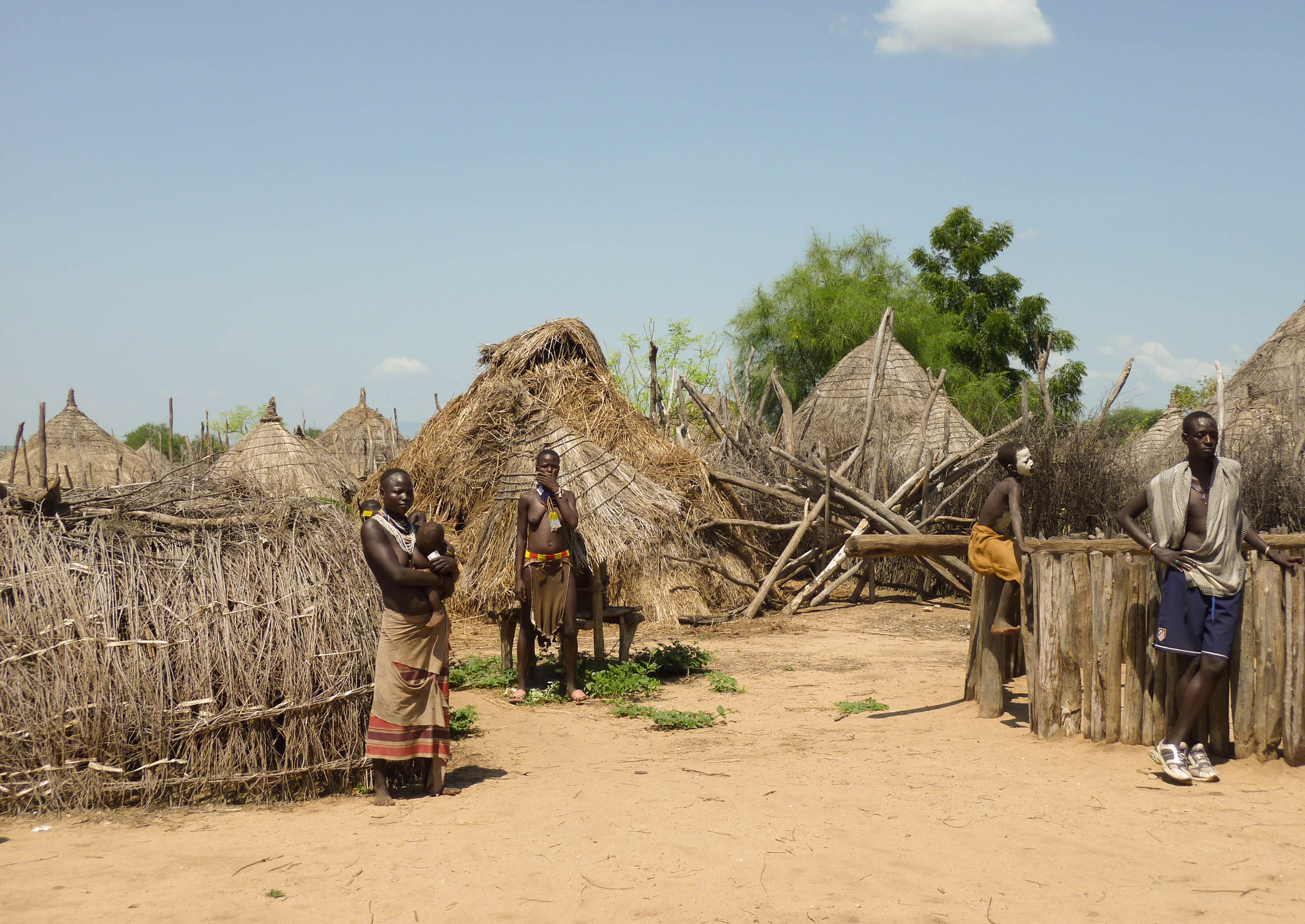
A Karo village

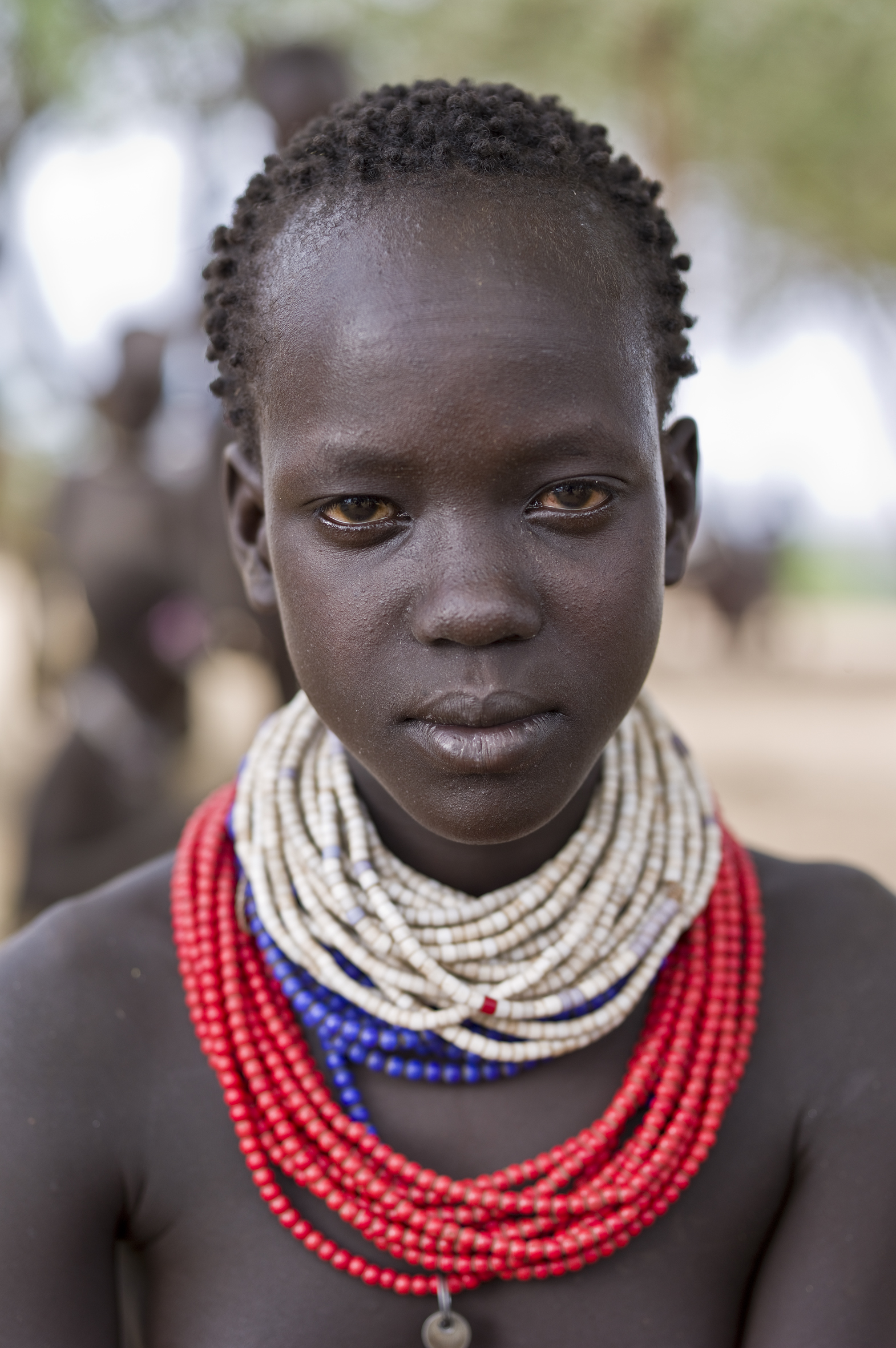
A young Karo woman

Karo (also Cherre, Kere, Kerre, Kara) is a South Omotic language spoken in the Debub (South) Omo Zone of the Southern Nations, Nationalities, and People's Region in Ethiopia. Karo is described as being closely related to its neighbor, Hamer-Banna, with a lexical similarity of 81%, and is considered a dialect of Hamer by Blench (2006), but as a separate language belonging to the Hamer-Karo subfamily in Glottolog. The Karo people, who live close to the lower Omo River, use colorful bodywork, complex headdresses and body scars to express beauty and importance within the community. 2,400 speakers are using the Karo language.

== Basic vocabulary ==
In percentages of basic vocabulary scored by 14 Omotic languages against 13 others, Karo scored 12 in Male, 9 in Chara, 12 in Basketo, 12 in Wolaytta, 14 in Kullo, 10 in Dace, 14 in Dorze, 14 in Oyda, 5 in Kacama, 10 in Koyra, 10 in Gidicho, 14 in Zayse, 14 in Zergulla. Unlike the strongest contributors to pairs of languages sharing unitary forms language-wise such as Inyangatom, Central Koma and Langa, Disoha, and Ingassana, Karo contributed none.
