= Omotic languages =

Language family of Ethiopia and Sudan

Omotic
- Geographic distribution: Ethiopia, Sudan
- Native speakers: 7.9 million
- Linguistic classification: Afro-Asiatic (?): Omotic
- Proto-language: Proto-Omotic
- Subdivisions: Damotic; Dizoid; Mao; Aroid

Language codes
- ISO 639-5: omv
- Glottolog: None
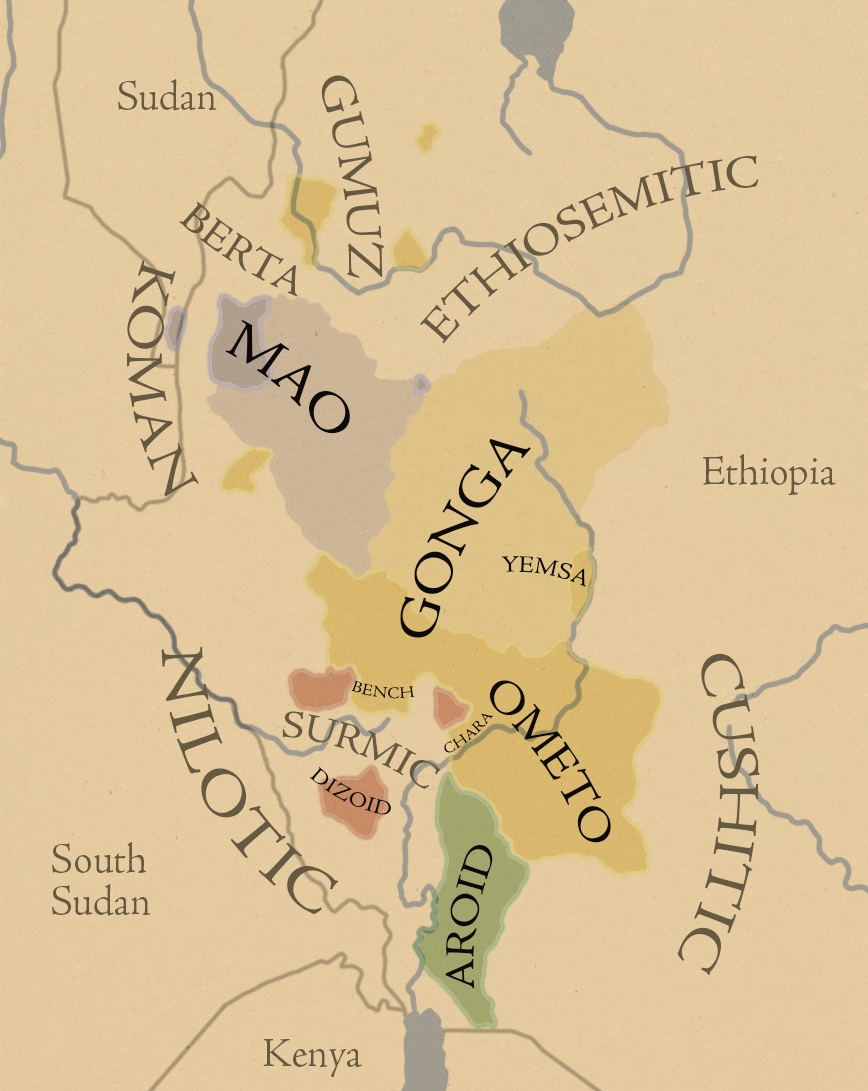
- Current and pre-Oromo invasion distribution of the Omotic languages

The Omotic languages are a traditionally recognized but disputed grouping of languages spoken mainly in southwestern Ethiopia, around the Omo River region, and in parts of southeastern Sudan (Blue Nile State). This classification conventionally includes the Damotic (North Omotic), Dizoid (Majoid), Mao and Aroid (South Omotic) languages.

Some of these languages are written in the Geʽez script, while others use the Latin alphabet. They are generally agglutinative and exhibit complex tonal systems, as in the Bench language. The group comprises about 7.9 million speakers.

They are generally classified within the Afroasiatic family, though the internal coherence of Omotic as a linguistic unit is questioned by some linguists. For example, Güldemann treats Damotic and Dizoid as Afroasiatic, but considers Mao and Aroid to be separate language groups outside Afroasiatic, influenced by contact with North Omotic.

== Classification ==
Four main groups of the Omotic languages are distinguished: Damotic (Ta-Ne Omotic, Gonga-Gimojan), Dizoid (Maji), Mao, and Aroid (Ari-Banna or South Omotic), with no consensus classification of the relationship between them. Both the internal unity of Omotic and their wider affiliation are debated.

Omotic?
  - Damotic
    - Gonga (Shinasha, Anfillo, Kafa, Shekkacho)
    - Gimojan
      - Yemsa
      - Ometo–Gimira
        - Bench
        - Chara
        - Ometo
          - North Ometo (Wolaita, Gamo-Gofa-Dawro, Dorze, Melo, Oyda, Basketo)
          - East Ometo (Koorete, Zayse-Zergulla, Kachama-Ganjule)
          - Maale
  - Dizoid (Dizi, Sheko, Nayi)
  - Mao (Bambassi, Hozo, Seze, Ganza)
  - Aroid (Hamer, Aari, Gayil, Dime)

The Omotic languages are often included as a branch of the Afroasiatic languages, and within this hypothesis generally considered its most divergent branch. Blench notes that Omotic shares honey-related vocabulary with Cushitic but not cattle-related terms, suggesting a very early split, possibly before the spread of pastoralism.

Damotic is the clearest candidate for Afroasiatic affiliation, while Dizoid shows some Afroasiatic features but its classification remains uncertain and requires further research. Some linguists, including Güldemann, classify only Damotic and Dizoid as Afroasiatic, while treating Mao and Aroid as separate groups outside Afroasiatic that have been strongly shaped by contact.

The Mao languages, spoken on the Sudan-Ethiopian border, are poorly documented and show strong influence from Koman languages. Because of this and the lack of basic descriptive work, their genealogical affiliation remains unclear.

The Aroid languages are the most controversial. Their external classification has long been disputed, with proposals linking them to Nilo-Saharan languages. At the same time, scholars acknowledge heavy contact influence from neighboring Nilo-Saharan (Surmic and Nilotic) languages and from Afroasiatic languages, including Damotic, Dizoid, and Cushitic. Güldemann (2018) stresses that existing proposals do not adequately distinguish inherited features from areal effects, making it impossible to reach firm conclusions. As a result, Aroid is often treated as a possibly isolated family with no established higher-level affiliation.

Recent genome-wide and ancient DNA studies provide independent support for this linguistic separation: Damotic groups such as the Wolayta cluster genetically with Cushitic speakers and bear substantial West Eurasian admixture, whereas Aroid populations such as the Aari show stronger continuity with the ancient local hunter-gatherer Mota genome and much lower levels of that Eurasian signal. These distinct population histories reinforce the linguistic view that similarities between Damotic and Aroid then are primarily the result of long-term contact rather than common descent.

== History of research ==
In earlier 19th-century classifications, linguists such as d’Abbadie and Latham grouped most of what are now classified as Damotic under the name Gonga (including the Ometo languages) and treated them as "Hamitic (today Berber and Cushitic) languages of Great Damot". They were also included in the initial concept of Cushitic by Leo Reinisch. Following improved understanding of the languages, two more detailed classifications by Enrico Cerulli and Mario Moreno in the 1930s to 1940s separated them as their own subgroup, named "Ta-Ne" by Moreno after its 1st and 2nd person pronouns; they included also the Dizoid languages in a lower-order subgroup together with Bench. Greenberg (1963) introduced the name "West Cushitic" and for the first time proposed the inclusion of Aroid. Fleming (1969) argued instead that Omotic should be considered an independent branch of Afroasiatic, a view largely accepted after Bender (1971). although the West Cushitic position continued to have support for some time.

== Characteristics ==
=== General ===
The Omotic languages have a morphology that is partly agglutinative and partly fusional:

- Agglutinating: Yem am-se-f-∅-à go+plural+present+3. Person+Femininum “they go”
- Fusional: Aari ʔíts-eka eat+3. Person Pl. Converb "by eating"

Inflection through suprasegmental morphemes is found in individual languages such as Dizi and Bench; Historically, these are partly reflexes of affixes:

- Bench sum˩ "name", sum-s˦ "to name"

The nominal morphology is based on a nominative-accusative-absolutive system; for verbal morphology, a complex inflection according to categories such as tense/aspect, interrogative/declarative, and affirmative/negative, as well as agreement, is more predicative, characterizing forms with the subject. In syntax, the word order subject-object-verb (SOV) is generally valid; postpositions are used, which can be considered typical for both SOV languages in general and for the Ethiopian region.

=== Phonology ===
The Omotic languages have on average slightly less than thirty consonant phonemes, which is a comparatively high number, but is also found in other primary branches of Afro-Asiatic. Commonly used are bilabial, alveolar, velar and glottal plosive, various fricatives, alveolar affricates and /w/, /j/, /l/, /r/, /m/, /n/. The non-glottal plosives are typically each represented by a voiced, a voiceless, and an ejective phoneme. All three types can also be found in fricatives and affricates. Most Omotic languages have additional consonants. Examples of this are implosives in Aroid (/ɓ/, /ɗ/) and retroflex consonants in Bench. In some cases, consonants can also occur geminated. Representatives of Damotic and Mao have five to six vowel phonemes and vowel length. Larger vowel systems have been proposed for Aroid.

All Omotic languages for which sufficient data is available are tonal languages, which usually only distinguish two tones (high and low). Some languages have more tones: Dizi distinguishes three, Bench six. Certain Omotic languages such as Aari and Ganza (Mao) have tonal accent systems in which each independent word has exactly one high tone, whereas in most languages the tones are freely distributed.

=== Morphology ===
==== Nouns ====
The Omotic languages distinguish between the nominal categories number, case, and definiteness. These categories are marked by different suffixes, which can be fusional or analytic depending on the language. The two genders in all omotic languages for which sufficient data are available are masculine and feminine; they essentially correspond to natural gender. The case system distinguishes the omotic languages as accusative languages; other cases form various adverbial determinations. A number of omotic languages have an absolutive case, which marks the citation form and the direct object (examples from Wolaita):

- Absolute keett-a "the house"
- Nominative keett-i "the house"

Some common case suffixes are:

- Nominative *-i (Gonga-Gimojan, Dizi-Sheko)
- Accusative *-m (South Domotic)
- Genitive *-kV (Gonga-Gimojan, Dizi-Sheko, Mao, Dime)
- Dative *-s (Gonga-Gimojan, Dizi-Sheko, Mao?)

A typological peculiarity, which is also isolated within Omotic, is the person and gender dependency of the nominative in Bench (either -i˧ or -a˧, depending on the person):

- a˦tsin˦-a˧ "a woman" (3rd person sg. femininum)
- nun˧-a˧ "we" (1st person plural exclusive)
- nas˦i˧ "a man" (3rd person sg. masculine)

In most languages, the singular is unmarked, while the plural has its own suffix. It is possible that plural suffixes in some languages arose from a partitive construction. This is supported by the length of certain plural suffixes, formal relationships to the genitive singular and the fact that the determining suffix sometimes comes before the plural suffix, which is typologically unusual:

- Dizi kìan-à-kʾankàs dog+det.+plural "the dogs"
- Yem ʔasú-nì-kitó human+gene+plural "people"

==== Pronouns ====
The personal pronouns distinguish similar categories to the nouns in most Omotic languages. Gender is usually only marked in the 3rd person singular. The personal pronouns usually have their own stem for each number-person-gender combination, to which case suffixes are then added, which are the same for all persons. Some of the pronouns show similarities with other Afro-Asian language families and can therefore be traced back to Proto-Afro-Asiatic; Certain South Omotic personal pronouns can be explained as borrowings from the neighboring Nilo-Saharan:

		1st person		2nd person		3rd person		
		sg.	pl.	sg.	pl.	sg.		pl.
		sg.	pl.	sg.	pl.	m.	f.	pl.
Omotic	Nordomotic							
Omotic	Proto-Gonga-Gimojan	*ta	*nu~*no	*no	*int-	*isi	?	*is-
Omotic	Proto-Dizi-Sheko	*ǹ	*ń	*yeta	*iti	*iz-	*iži	*iš-
Omotic	Proto-Mao	*ti-	?	*hiya	*nam	?	?	?
Omotic	Proto-Aroid	*inta	*wo-ta	*yaa/*in	*ye-ta	*nuo	*naaa	*ke-ta
Other	Afroasiatic: Akkadian	ī	nī	k-a/k-ī	k-unu/k-ina	š-u	š-a	š-unu/š-ina
Other	Nilotic: Teso	ɛɔŋɔ	ɔnɪ/ɪs(y)ɔ	ɪjɔ	yɛsɪ	ŋɛsɪ		kɛsɪ

The case endings of the personal pronouns and the nouns are usually identical:

- Aari: Accusative -m: yé-m "you", fatir-in-ám "the corn"

Possessive pronouns in particular have their own forms:

- Aari: yé "yours," ʔéed-te "a man's"

== Reconstruction ==
Bender (1987: 33–35) reconstructs the following proto-forms for Proto-Omotic and Proto-North Omotic, the latter which is considered to have descended from Proto-Omotic.

English gloss	Proto- Omotic	Proto-North Omotic
ashes	*bend	
bird	*kaf	
bite		*sats’
breast	*t’iam	
claw	*ts’ugum	
die	*hayk’	
dog	*kan	
egg	*ɓul	
fire		*tam
grass	*maata	
hand		*kuc
head	*to-	
hear	*si-	
mouth	*non-	
nose	*si(n)t’	
root	*ts’ab-	
snake	*šooš	
stand (vb.)		*yek’
this	*kʰan-	
thou (2.SG)	*ne(n)	
water	*haats’	
we (1.PL)	*nu(n)	
ye (2.PL)	*int-	
green	*c’il-	
house		*kyet
left	*hadr-	
elephant	*daŋgVr	
sister, mother	*ind	
armpit		*šoɓ-
boat	*gong-	
grave	*duuk	
vomit		*c’oš-

== Comparative vocabulary ==
Sample basic vocabulary of 40 Omotic languages from Blažek (2008):

Language	eye	ear	nose	tooth	tongue	mouth	blood	bone	tree	water	eat	name
Basketo	af	waytsi	sints	ačči	B ɪnts'ɨrs	no·na	suuts	mεk'εts	B mɪts	B waːtse	A moy-	B sumsa
Dokka	af	waytsi	si·nts	ačči	ɨrs'ɪns	no·na	su·ts	mik'әts	mittse	wa·tsi	m-	suntsa
Male	’aːpi	waizi	sied‘i	’ači	’ɪndɪrsi	daŋka	sugutsi	mεgεtsi	mitsi	waːtsi	mo-	sunsi
Wolaita	ayf-iya; A ayp'-iya	haytta	sir-iya	acca; A acc'a	int'arsa	doona	suutta; Ch maččamié	mek'etta	mitta	hatta	m-	sunta
Dawro	ayp'-iya	haytsa	siid'-iya	acc'a	ins'arsa	doona	sutsa	mek'etsa	barzap'-iya	hatsa	m-	sutta
Cancha	ayp'e	hayts	sire	acc‘a	ins‘arsa	doona	suts	mek'etsa	mits	haats	m-	sunts
Malo	’áɸe	hʌ́je	síd'e	’áčʰә	’irɪ́nts	dɔ́nʌ	sútsʰ	mεk‘ɨ́ts‘	mɪ́ts	’átsә	m-	sʊns
Gofa	ayp'e	haytsa	siide	acc'a	intsarsa	doona	sutsa	mek'etta	mitsa	hatse	m-	suntsa
Zala	ayfe	(h)aytsa	sid'e	ačča	int'arsa	duna	tsutsa		mitsa	hatsa	maa-	
Gamu	ayp'e	haytsa	siire	acc'a	ins'arsa	doona	suuts	mek'ets	mitsa	hatse	m-	sunts
Dache	ayfe	hayts'e	siyd'e	acé	ɪntsεrs	duna	suts	mek'ets	šara	hatse	m-	sunts
Dorze	ayp'e	waye	sire	acc'a	ins'arsa	duuna	suts	mek'etsa	mits	haats	m-	sunts
Oyda	ápe, ayfe	B haːye	sid'e	’ač, pl. o·či	iláns	B doːna	suts	mεk'εts	mɪns'a	haytsi	mu’-	suntsu
Zayse	’áaɸε	waayέ	kuŋké	’acc'	ints'έrε	baadέ	súuts'	mεk'έεte	mits'a	wáats'i	m-	č'úuč'e
Zergulla	’aːɸe	wai	kuŋki	’ac'e	’insәre	haː’e	suːts	nεkεtε	mintsa	waːtse	m-	suːns
Ganjule	’áaɸε	waašέ	kuŋkε	gaggo	ints'úrε	baadέ	súuts'	mεk'έtε	mits'i	waats'i	m-	ts'únts'i
Gidicho	’áaɸε	waašέ	kuŋké	gaggo	ints'úrε	baadέ	súuts'i	mεk'εte	míts'i	wáats'i	m-	ts'únts'i
Kachama	’áaɸε	uwaašέ	kuŋkέ	gaggo	ints'úrε	baadέ	súuts'ε	mέk‘έtee	mits'i	wáats'i	m-	ts'únts'i
Koyra	’áɸε	waayέ	siid'ε	gaggo	’únts'úrε	’áaša	súuts'	mεk‘έεte	míts'e; Ce akka	wáats'e	múuwa	súuntsi
Chara	áːpa	wóːya	sínt'u	áč'a	’íns'ila	noːná	súːta	mertá	mítsa	áːs'a	ḿ-na	sumá
Bench	ap	(h)ay	sint'	gaš; san	eyts'	non	sut	mert	inč	so’	m’	sum
She	af	ai	sint'	gaš	ets'	non	sut	mεrt	enc	so’	mma	sum
Yemsa	aafa; kema	odo	siya	a’ya	terma	noono	anna	mega	i’o	aka	me	suna
Bworo	aawa	waaza	šint'a	gaša	albeera	noona	ts'atts'a	mak'әttsa	mitta	aatsa	maa-	šuutsa
Anfillo	aːfo	waːjo	šiːnto	gaːššo	εrɪːtso	nɔːno	ts'antso	šaušo	mɪːtso	yuːro	m	šiːgo
Kafa	affo, aho	wammo; kendo	muddo	gašo	eč'iyo	nono; koko	dammo	šawušo	met'o	ač'o	mammo; č‘okko	šiggo
Mocha	á·p̱o	wa·mmo	šit'ó	gášo	häč'awo	no·no	damo	ša·wúšo	mit'ó	à·č'o	ma̱·(hä)	šəgo
Proto-Omotic			*si(n)t’			*non-				*haats’		
Maji
Proto-Maji	*ʔaːb	*háːy		*aːç’u		*eːdu		*uːs	*inču	*haːy	*um	
Dizi	ab-u	aːi	sin-u	ažu	yabɪl	εd-u	yεrm-u	us	wɪč	aːi	m-	sɪm-u
Shako	áːb	aːy	B sɪnt'	áːč'u	érb	eːd	yärm	uːsu	íːnču	áːy	m̥̀-	suːm
Nayi	’aːf	B haːy	si.n	B acu	B yalb	eːdu	yarbm	’uːs	B incus	B hai	m-	suːm
Mao
Mao	áːfέ	wáːlέ	šíːnt'έ	àːts'ὲ	ánts'ílὲ	pɔ́ːnsὲ	hándέ	máːlt‘έ	’íːntsὲ	hàːtsὲ	hà míjà	jèːškέ
Seze	aːb, áːwi	wέὲ	šíːnté	háːts'έ, haːnsì	jántsílὲ/ t'agál	waːndè	hámbìlὲ	bàk‘ílí	’innsì	háːns'ì	máːmɔ́	nìːší
Hozo	abbi	wεεra	šini	ats'i	S wìntə́lә	waandi	hambilε	bak‘ilε	S ’íːnti	haani	maa	iiši
Aroid
Dime	’afe, ’aɸe	k'aːme	nʊkʊ	F baŋgɪl; ɪts; kәsɪl	’ɨdәm	’afe; B ’app-	maχse; F dzumt	k‘oss; F k‘ʊs	’aχe; B haːɣo	naχe; B nәːɣ-	’ɨčɨn	mɨze; F naːb
Hamer	api, afi	k'a(ː)m-	nuki	’ats'	’ad’ab	ap-	zum’i	leːfi	ak'-	noko	kʊm-	nam-
Banna	afi	k'ami	nuki	atsi	adʌb/adɪm	afa	zump'i	lεfi	ɑhaka/haːk'a	noko	its-; kum-	na(a)bi
Karo	afi	k'ami	nuki	asi	attәp'	M ’apo	mәk'әs	lefi	aka	nuk'o	isidi	
Ari	afi	k'ami	nuki	atsi; B kasel geegi	adim	afa	zom’i	lεfi	ahaka	noɣa; B nɔk'ɔ	its-	nami
Ubamer	a·fi	ɣ/k'a·mi	nuki	atsi	admi	afa	mək'əs ~ -ɣ-	lεfí	aɣa	luk'a, luɣa	’its-	na·mi
Galila	a·fi	k'a·mi	nuki	ači	admi	afa	mәk'әs	lεfí	aɣa/aháɣa	lu·ɣa/lo·ɣa	ič-	la·mi

== See also ==
- Languages of Ethiopia

== Sources cited ==
- Amha, Azeb (2012). "Omotic". The Afroasiatic Languages. Cambridge University Press.
- Bender, M. Lionel (2000). Comparative Morphology of the Omotic Languages. Munich: LINCOM.
- Blench, Roger (2006). Archaeology, Language, and the African Past. Oxford: AltaMira Press. ISBN 9780759104662.
- Fleming, Harold (1976). "Omotic overview". In Bender, M. Lionel (ed.). The Non-Semitic Languages of Ethiopia. East Lansing, MI: Michigan State University. pp. 299–323.
- Hayward, Richard J., ed. (1990). Omotic Language Studies. London: School of Oriental and African Studies.
- Hayward, Richard J. (2003). "Omotic: the 'empty quarter' of Afroasiatic linguistics". In Jacqueline Lecarme (ed.). Research in Afroasiatic Grammar II: selected papers from the fifth conference on Afroasiatic languages, Paris 2000. Amsterdam: John Benjamins. pp. 241–261. doi:10.1075/cilt.241.13hay.
- Newman, Paul (1980). The classification of Chadic within Afroasiatic. Universitaire Pers Leiden.
- Lamberti, Marcello (1991). "Cushitic and its Classifications". Anthropos. 86 (4/6): 552–561.
- Lamberti, Marcello (1993). Materialien zum Yemsa. Studi Linguarum Africae Orientalis, Band 5. Heidelberg: Universitätsverlag Winter. ISBN 3-8253-0103-6.

- Bender, M. L. 1975. Omotic: a new Afroasiatic language family. (University Museum Series, 3.) Carbondale, IL: Southern Illinois University.
- Zaborski, Andrzej. 1986. Can Omotic be reclassified as West Cushitic? In Gideon Goldenberg, ed., Ethiopian Studies: Proceedings of the 6th International Conference pp. 525–530. Rotterdam: Balkema.
