= Aroid languages =

Omotic language family of Ethiopia

Aroid
- Ari-Banna, South Omotic
- Geographic distribution: Ethiopia, mainly South Omo Zone
- Linguistic classification: Afroasiatic?: Omotic?; Aroid
- Subdivisions: Aari–Gayil; Hamer; Dime

Language codes
- Glottolog: sout2845

The Aroid or Ari-Banna (sometimes South Omotic or Somotic) languages possibly belong to the Afro-Asiatic family and are spoken in Ethiopia.

== Languages ==
There are five Aroid languages:

- Aroid languages
  - Aari-Gayil languages
    - Aari
    - Gayil
  - Hamer-Karo languages
    - Hamer-Banna
    - Karo (Ethiopia)
  - Dime

== External classification ==
The classification of South Omotic (also called Aroid) is highly disputed and it may be a separate language family. Karo is sometimes considered a dialect of Hamer, but considered as a separate language by Glottolog which groups both in a Hamer-Karo subfamily.

Zaborski (1986) and Lamberti (1993) consider South Omotic to be a separate branch of Cushitic, renaming it as West Cushitic.

Bender (2000, 2003) notes that South Omotic is in fact quite divergent from other Afroasiatic languages, and suggests that it may in fact have connections with Nilo-Saharan, such as Surmic and Nilotic.

Enrico Cerulli had proposed that Aroid languages might be a part of Nilotic. Citing lexical similarities with Surmic and other non-Nilotic Nilo-Saharan languages, Yigezu (2013) argues that Aroid (a.k.a. South Omotic) has a "Nilo-Saharan origin" and had become strongly influenced by other "Omotic" language groups. The Proto-Aroid vowel system is also more similar to those of the Surmic and Nilotic languages (Yigezu 2006, 2013).

Glottolog 4.0 does not recognize that South Omotic belongs to one of the disputed families, and the candidate group of Omotic languages (grouping both North and South Omotic languages) remains disputed. For this reason it is considered for now as a separate family.

== Reconstruction ==
Proto-Aroid
- Reconstruction of: Aroid languages

Below is a reconstruction of Proto-Aroid by Yigezu (2013).

Gloss	Proto-Aroid
animal	*dabɪ-
arrow	*bʌnkʌr
blow	*pug-
boat (canoe)	*gongul
buffalo	*meek-
burn	*ʔats-
bury	*duuk-
calabash	*gusi
call (v)	*ɛl-
cattle	*waak-
charcoal	*tʃ’ilʃ-
chicken	*baatʃa ~ *koyz
chicken	*baatʃ-
chief	*biti
claw	*guʃ-
climb	*wut-
cloth	*apala
cotton	*putta
count	*payd-
crocodile	*gurgur
divide (v)	*kʌʃ-
donkey	*ukul-
drink (v)	*wutʃ’-
dry season	*bona
egg	*muk’-; *mol-
father	*baab
fire	*no̤ha ~ *nuu
hand/arm	*ʔan
hat	*koɓ-
head	*mat-
hoe	*gaita
hold	*yʌd
I	*ʔinta
liver	*tʊ/ur-
make	*ʔaʃk-
mother	*ʔind-
mouth	*ʔap-
navel	*gulɗ-
nine	*sakal
open	*bul-
people	*eedna
person	*eed
pierce	*tors-
plant	*kor-
rainy season	*bʌrgi
road	*gɔgi
salt	*sok’o
sand	*ʃaam-
seed	*ɓenta
sew	*dʒaag-
shoot	*kʌs’-
show	*ɗaw-
six	*la̤h
smoke (n)	*tʃ’ub-
snake	*gun-
sow	*dʊk’-
spit	*tʌs’-; *pas’-
split	*p’al-
tail	*go/ul-
ten	*tʌmm-; *tʌɓ-
tobacco	*dampo
untie	*bul-
urinate	*ʃaan-
urine	*ʃaan
1SG	*ʔinta
2SG	*ya-
3SG.MASC	*no̤h/nuu
3SG.FEM	*naa
3SG.NEUT	*yi
1PL	*wot-
2PL	*yʌt-
3PL	*kɛt-

== Numerals ==
Comparison of numerals in individual languages:

Language	1	2	3	4	5	6	7	8	9	10
Aari	wólːáq	qastːén	makːén	ʔoydːí	dónqː	láː	tabzá	qastːaː́ntámːers (lit. two less than ten)	wolqáːntámːers (lit. one less than ten)	támːá
Hamer-Banna (1)	kála	lamá	makkán	oidí	dunɡ̥	lax	toɓɓá	lankái	sal	táɓi
Hamer-Banna (2)	kʌlʌ	lɛmaː	makan	ʔoʷidi / ʔuʷidi	duŋ	lʌx	tʌɓa / toɓa	lʌŋkaⁱ	səl	təɓi
Dime	ˈwɔkʰʌl / wókkil	ˈkʼʌtʼɨm / kʼəstin	ˈmʌkʰɨm / mə́kkim	ʔʊdːʊ / ʔúddú	ˈʃənːə / ʃinní	ˈlahə ~ ˈlah / láxi	ˈtʰʊsːʊm / tússum	ˈkʼʌʃnaʃ / kʼaʃnáʃiʃ	ˈwʌklaʃ / wókláʃiʃ	ˈtʰamːe / təmme
Karo (Kara Apo)	kala	lama	makkam	ojidi	dɔŋ	la	tsoɓa	lɔɔŋkaji	sal	taɓi

== See also ==
- List of Proto-Aroid reconstructions (Wiktionary)
