= Ethiopian language area =

Hypothesized linguistic area of Ethiopia developed by Charles A. Ferguson

The Ethiopian language area is a hypothesized linguistic area that was first proposed by Charles A. Ferguson (1970, 1976), who posited a number of phonological and morphosyntactic features that were found widely across Ethiopia and Eritrea, including the Ethio-Semitic, Cushitic and Omotic languages but not the Nilo-Saharan languages.

Others scholars have since pointed out smaller areas of shared features within the larger area (Appleyard 1989, Breeze 1988, Sasse 1986, Tosco 1994, Wedekind 1989).

== Features ==
One of area's most notable features seems to be the use of the verb "say" as an inflected dummy element for an uninflected lexical base (Appleyard 2001, Cohen et al. 2002). Hayward also pointed out patterns of lexicalisation as evidence of a shared linguistic unity across the area (1999, 2000), and Treis noted further examples (2010).

== Views ==
Though Tosco earlier accepted that the area's status had "long been well established" (1994:415), he later challenged Ferguson's work as flawed (2000). He concludes that the Ethiopian language area is not valid and suggests that Ferguson's work reflects the politics of his time, when there was a strong emphasis on Ethiopian unity, as reflected in Donald N. Levine's book Greater Ethiopia: The Evolution of a Multiethnic Society.

Baye Yimam has shown evidence of pragmatic similarities among languages of the Ethiopian language area (1997).

Andrzej Zaborski has posited an "Ethiopian Macroarea consisting of a series of concatenated subareas" (p. 30). He went on to say "North-Eastern Africa is a very good example of overlapping (or interacting) areas" (p. 32).

Tom Güldemann has proposed that the use of a generic auxiliary is an area feature that includes Ethiopia but also other languages to its west and northwest. Similarly, Cohen, Simeone-Senelle, and Vanhove have examined the grammaticalised use of "say" and "do" as an area feature of what the scholars call "East Africa".

Wu Tong has examined prenominal relative clauses as an areal feature in the Ethiopian language area.

Tolemariam Fufa Teso has done a broad comparative study of verbal derivation across the area.

Joachim Crass and Ronny Meyer have proposed a longer list of features for the Ethiopian Language Area. They conclude "Ethiopian languages indeed form a linguistic area".

However, after more research, Ronny Meyer concluded that "despite the relatively extensive research over several decades, the Ethiopian Linguistic Area is still not sufficiently defined and needs further investigation."

Yvonne Treis has also studied the Ethiopian Language Area. She has suggested a switch reference marker as a possible feature. Like those before her, she concluded, "We need more in-depth studies of individual traits and their distribution."

The existence of the Ethiopian Language Area is still debated.
