= Shakacho language =

Afro-Asiatic Omotic language of Ethiopia

Shekkacho
- Shekki noono
- Native to: Ethiopia
- Region: North Kafa region
- Native speakers: 80,000 (2007 census)
- Language family: Afro-Asiatic: Omotic; North; Gonga; Kafa–Shekkacho; Shekkacho
- Writing system: Ethiopic, Latin

Language codes
- ISO 639-3: moy
- Glottolog: shek1244

Shekkacho (also Shakacho, Shekka; the name "Mocha", common in older descriptions, is seen as derogatory) is an Afro-Asiatic Omotic language, spoken mainly in Sheka Zone at southwestern Ethiopia. It is most closely related to Kafa.

== Bibliography ==
- Leslau, Wolf. 1958. “Moča, A Tone Language of The Kafa Group in South-Western Ethiopia.” Africa 28: 135-147.
- Leslau, Wolf. 1959. A Dictionary of Moča (South-Western Ethiopia). Los Angeles: University of California Press.
