= Gayil language =

Omotic language spoken in Ethiopia

Gayil
- Native to: Ethiopia
- Region: Southwest, South Omo zone, Southern Nations, Nationalities, and People's Region
- Native speakers: 56,000 (2007)
- Language family: Afro-Asiatic: Omotic; South; Gayil

Language codes
- ISO 639-3: gyl
- Glottolog: gayi1237

Gayil (also called Gayl, Gayi, Galila, Gelila, Northern Ari) is an Omotic language of Ethiopia. According to the 2007 census, 55,700 people speak Gayil as a mother tongue.

== Bibliography ==
- Alemayehu Abebe (2002). "Sociolinguistic survey report on the Ometo dialect of Ethiopia, part II", SIL Electronic Survey Reports 2002-012.
