= Kachama-Ganjule language =

Omotic language spoken in Ethiopia

Kachama-Ganjule
- Native to: Ethiopia
- Region: on islands in Lake Chamo and Lake Abaya
- Native speakers: 2,800 (2007 census for Qechemigna)
- Language family: Afro-Asiatic: Omotic; North Omotic; Ometo; East; Kachama-Ganjule
- Dialects: Kachama; Ganjule; ?Gidicho

Language codes
- ISO 639-3: kcx
- Glottolog: kach1284
- ELP: Gats'amé

Kachama-Ganjule is an Afroasiatic language spoken in Ethiopia on islands in Lake Chamo and Lake Abaya. Kachama is spoken on Gidicho island in Lake Abaya, whereas Ganjule was originally spoken on a small island in Lake Chamo. Now the Ganjule speakers have relocated to the west shore of the Lake. There still are about 1,000 monolinguals in this language.
