= Anfillo language =

Northern Omotic language of Ethiopia

Anfillo
- Mao
- Region: Ethiopia
- Native speakers: (500 cited 1990)
- Language family: Afro-Asiatic: Omotic; Gonga; Anfillo

Language codes
- ISO 639-3: myo
- Glottolog: anfi1235
- ELP: Anfillo

Anfillo (also known as Mao or Southern Mao) is a Omotic language spoken in western Ethiopia by a few hundred people. The term Anfillo is used to refer both to the language and the people found in a small community in the Anfillo woreda, part of the Mirab Welega Zone. The language is on the verge of extinction as it is spoken only by adults above the age of sixty. All younger generations have shifted to Western Oromo as of 2007.

Anfillo has five vowels and about 22 consonants. Long vowels and consonants do occur and may have phonemic value. The basic word order is subject–object–verb. Nouns follow their modifier. Verbs are inflected for tense, aspect and mood. Three tenses are marked morphologically: present, past, and future. Gender and number are expressed lexically.
