= Melo language =

Afro-Asiatic of Ethiopia

Melo
- Native to: Ethiopia
- Region: Gamo Gofa Zone
- Native speakers: (20,000 cited 1994 census)
- Language family: Afro-Asiatic: Omotic; North; Ometo; North; Melo

Language codes
- ISO 639-3: mfx
- Glottolog: melo1242
- ELP: Malo

Melo (also known as Malo) is an Afro-Asiatic language spoken in the Gamo Gofa Zone of the Southern Nations, Nationalities, and People's Region in Ethiopia.

== Case ==
There are eight cases in Malo.

1. Nominative
2. Accusative
3. Dative
4. Genitive
5. Instrumental
6. Commutative
7. Ablative

== Nominative case ==
Nominative case has <i> and <a> for masculine and feminine markers respectively.

However, if there is a vowel at the end of the noun, the masculine came marker<i> will change to <y>.

Examples,

Nominative Noun	Nominative Case Marker	Verb	Perfect	Affirmative Marker
dura	-y	gup	-e	-z
sheep		jumped		
The sheep jumped.
Nominative Noun	Nominative Case Marker	Verb	Perfect	Affirmative Marker
gemata	-y	ye?	-e	-z
ox		came		
The ox came.

Nominative feminine case takes the marker <a> with definite marker <t>.

Examples,

Nominative Noun	Definite Marker	Nominative Case Marker	Verb	Perfect	Affirmative Marker
kapa	-t	-a	pri	-e	-z
bird			fly		
The bird fly

Proper nouns also take the nominative case marker <i> and <a>.

Examples,

Proper Noun	Nominative Case Marker	Verb	Perfect	Affirmative Marker
Dayda	-y	miiz	-e	-z
Dayda(Name)		laughed		
Dayda laughed

== Accusative case ==
The marker <-a> is for masculine nouns.

Example,

Nominative Noun	Nominative Case Marker	Accusative Noun	Accusative Case Marker Masculine	Verb	Perfect	Affirmative Marker
as	-i	gamata	-a	?ad	-e	-z
man		ox		hit		
The man hit the ox.

The maker <-o> is for feminine nouns. It is attached to the definite marker ‘t’.

Example,

Nominative Noun	Nominative Case Marker	Accusative Noun	Definitive Marker	Accusative Feminine Marker	Verb	Perfect	Affirmative marker
gadara	-y	maha	-t	-o	be?	e	z
Hyena		tiger			saw		
The hyena saw the tiger.

*Proper nouns are not inflected for the accusative case marker.

== Similarities Between Nominative and Accusative ==
Masculine Nominative and Accusative Case Markers stay the same for the plural nouns which are <i> and <a> respectively.

Nominative and Accusative Case Marker is always to be definite. Indefinite nouns do not take Nominative and Accusative Case.

== Dative case ==
Dative Case Markers are <s> and <as>.

Examples,

Nominative	Nominative Case Marker	Accusative Noun	Accusative Cace Marker	Dative Noun	Dative Case Marker	Verb	Present Perfet	Affirmative case marker
tan	-i	gamata	-a	Ba?uno	-s	?ing	-e	-z
I		ox		Ba?uno		gave		
I gave the ox to Ba?uno.

== Genitive case ==
Genitive Case uses two different ways to express.

1. Possessive Pronoun before Possessed Noun.

2. Third person possessive pronoun marker ‘pa’

1. Possessive pronoun:

Possessive Pronouns	Gloss	Possessed Nouna	Gloss
ta	my	ta-kets	my house
nu	our	nu-kets	our house
ne	your	nu-kets	your house 2nd mas/fem
yi	your	yi-kets	your house 2nd
e	his	e-kets	his house
i	her	i-kets	her house
u	their	u-kets	their house

Examples,

Deka afila – Deka's cloth

Ta afila – my cloth

E afila – his cloth

2. Here ‘pa’ refers to ownership. In third person possessive pronouns are replaced with pa.

e	his	e-kets	his house
i	her	i-kets	her house
u	their	u-kets	their house

Examples,

Nominative Noun (As Pronoun)	Nominative Case Marker	Adding ‘pa’	Possessed Noun	Definitive Marker	Accusative Marker	Verb	Perfective	Affirmative
i	-a	pa	inda	-t	-o	kad	-e	-z
she		her mother				loved		
She loved her mother

iz-a pa inda-t-o kad-e-z – She loved her mother.

== Instrumental case ==
Instrumental case markers are <r> and <ar>.

Examples,

Nominal Noun	Nominal Case Marker	Pronoun (As Accusative Case)	Accusative Marker		Instrumental Noun	Instrumental Case Marker	Verb	Perfective		Affirmative
na?	-y	ez	-a		succ	-ar	?ad	-e		-z
child		he			stone		hit			
The child hit him with a stone.
asa		-y	gamma	-a	kawe	-r	wood		-e	-z
man			lion		gun		killed			
The man killed the lion with a gun.

== Commutative case ==
Commutative case markers are <r> and -<ar> with ‘wola’.

Here, the word ‘wola’ means together.

Examples,

Nominative Noun	Genitive /Nominative Case Marker	Commutative Noun	Commutative Case Marker	Wola	Verb	Perfective	Affirmative
iza	pa	azin	-ar	wola	woy	-e	-z
she	his husband			together	slept		
She slept with her husband together.
nu		ise	-r	wola	m	-e	-z
		brother		together	ate		
We ate with our brother together.

== Ablative case ==
Ablative case markers are <p> and <ap>.

It depicts the place of departure and a source the noun comes from.

Examples,

Nominative Noun	Definitive Marker	Nominative Case Marker	Ablative Case	Ablative Case Marker	Verb	Perfective	Affirmative
kassa		-y	awasa	-p	ye?	-e	-z
Kassa			from Awasa		came		
Kassa came from Awasa.
dees	-t	-a	dere	-p	ye	-e	-z
goat			from mountain		came		
The goat came from the mounta
