= Maale language =

Omotic language of Ethiopia

Maale
- Male
- Native to: Ethiopia
- Region: South Omo, Ethiopia
- Ethnicity: Maale
- Native speakers: 105,000 (2010 census)
- Language family: Afro-Asiatic: Omotic; North; Ometo; Maale
- Writing system: Ethiopic

Language codes
- ISO 639-3: mdy
- Glottolog: male1284
- ELP: Malé

Maale (also spelled Male) is an Omotic language spoken in the Omo Region of Ethiopia. The Maale people are vigorously maintaining their language despite exposure to outside pressures and languages. It is used for social, religious and local administrative purposes since most of its speakers are monolingual. There are plans to use the language as a medium of education as well.
