= Oyda language =

Omotic language spoken in Ethiopia

Oyda
- Native to: Ethiopia
- Region: Northwest Omo Region
- Native speakers: 37,000 (2007 census)
- Language family: Afro-Asiatic: Omotic; North Omotic; Ometo; North; Oyda

Language codes
- ISO 639-3: oyd
- Glottolog: oyda1235
- ELP: Oyda

Oyda is an Afro-Asiatic language spoken in the Gamo Gofa Zone of Ethiopia.

The 2007 Census of Ethiopia lists 45,120 individuals for the ethnic group.
