= Dorze language =

Afroasiatic language spoken by Dorze people in southern Ethiopia

Dorze
- Native to: Ethiopia
- Ethnicity: Dorze
- Native speakers: (21,000, including 9,900 monolinguals cited 1994 census)
- Language family: Afro-Asiatic: Omotic; North; Ometo; North; Dorze

Language codes
- ISO 639-3: doz
- Glottolog: dorz1235

Dorze is an Afro-Asiatic language spoken in the Gamo Gofa Zone of Ethiopia. Alemayehu Abebe reports that while performing preliminary fieldwork in 1992, he found 14 kebeles in Chencha woreda with Dorze speakers.

== See also ==
- Dorze people
