= North Omotic languages =

Language family of Ethiopia

North Omotic
- Ta-Ne-Omotic, Damotic
- Geographic distribution: Ethiopia
- Linguistic classification: Afro-Asiatic: Omotic; North Omotic
- Subdivisions: Gonga; Ometo; Bench; Yem; Dizoid?

Language codes
- Glottolog: gong1255
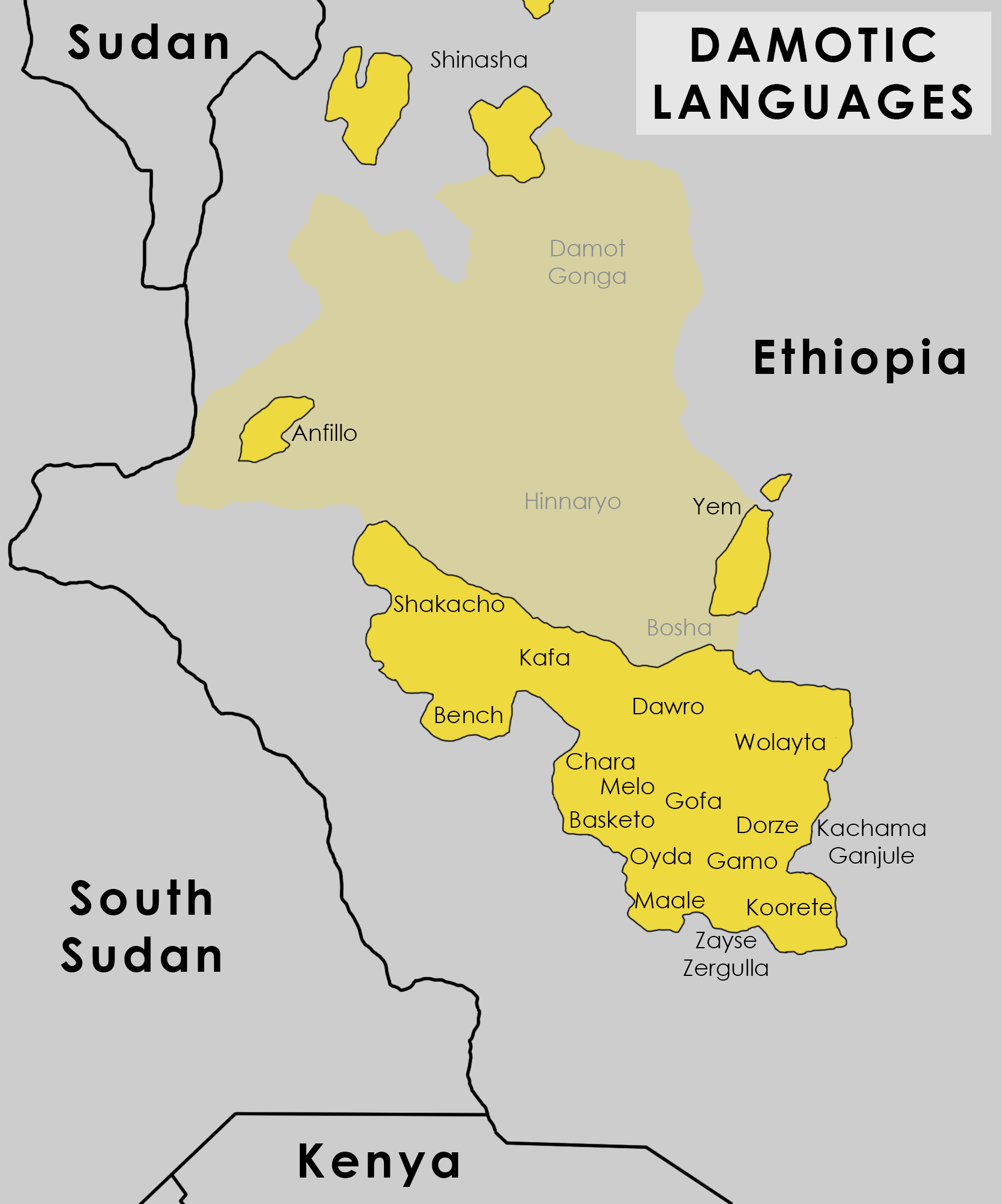
- Modern distribution of North Omotic languages (in yellow), and pre-Oromo expansion distribution (in light yellow)

The North Omotic languages, also known as Ta-Ne Omotic or Damotic, are possibly a branch of the Afroasiatic language family spoken in Ethiopia. They have traditionally been classified together with the Aroid, Dizoid, and Mao languages within the disputed "Omotic" family.

In 19th-century classifications linguists such as d’Abbadie and Latham grouped most of what are now classified as North Omotic under the name Gonga (including the Ometo languages) and treated them as "Hamitic languages of Great Damot".

== Subdivisions ==
The four Ta-Ne Omotic (North Omotic) subdivisions given by Güldemann (2018) are:

- Ometo-C’ara
- Gimira (Bench)
- Gonga
- Yemsa (Yem)

== Numerals ==
Comparison of numerals in individual languages:

Language	1	2	3	4	5	6	7	8	9	10
Yemsa (Janjero)	ʔɪsːɔːn11 / ʔɪsa11	ˈhɛpʰ1 / ʔɛpʰ1	ˈkʰeːz2	ʔa11ˈt͡ʃeːt͡ʃ3	ˈʔʊːt͡ʃ3	ʔɪ1ˈsiːʊn1	ˈnaː1fʊn1	ˈnaŋ2riːn1	ˈʔɪz1ɡɪn1	ʔa1sɪr1
Chara	ʔissa	nanta	keːza	obda	učča	sapma	lapma	nandirsa	bíža	tansá
Gimira (Bench)	matʼ3	nam4	kaz4	od4	ut͡ʃ2	sa2pm3	na2pm3	nʸar2tn3	irs2tn3	tam5
Maale	pétte	lamʔó	haitsó	ʔoidó	dónɡo	láhhó	lánkayi	sálli	tásuɓa	táɓɓó
Dorzze	ʔissino ~ istta	nam(ʔ)á	heezá ~ heedzi	ʔoidá	ʔitʃáʃa ~ ʔitʃátʃa	ʔusúpun ~ ʔusúɸun	láppun ~ láɸun	hóspun ~ hósɸun	ʔudúfun ~ ʔudúɸun	tám(m)i
Gamo (1)	ʔissíno / ʔistá	namʔá	heedzdzá	ʔoiddá	ʔitʃtʃátʃa	ʔusúppuna	laáppuna	hóspuna	ʔuddúpuna	támma
Gamo (2)	ʔissio (ʔista)	namʔa	heedzdza	ʔojdda	ʔitʃtʃatʃtʃa	ʔuspuna	laappuna	hospuna	ʔuddupuna	tamma
Gofa	ʔistá	namʔʔá	heedzdzá	ʔoiddá	ʔitʃtʃáʃa	ʔusúppuna	laáppuna	hósppuna	ʔuddúfuna	támma
Oyda	féttó	lamʔí	ɦaiddzí	ʔoiddí	ʔíccin	ʔizíppun (1+5)	láappun (2+5)	ʔóspun (3+5)	ʔiddífun (4+5)	táɓɓó
Wolaitta	ʔisttá	naaʔʔá	heezzá	ʔoiddá	ʔitʃtʃáʃa	ʔusúppuna	laápuna	hósppuna	ʔuddúpuna	támma
Koorete	ˈbɪ́dzːɔ̀	ˈlámʔɛ̀	ˈháʸdzɛ̀	ˈʔɔ́ʸdːɛ̀	ʔɪ̀ˈtʃɪ́tʃɛ̀	ʔɪ̀ˈzːúɸɛ̀	ˈláːpɛ̀	hàˈzːúpːɛ̀	ʔɔ̀ˈdːúpːɛ̀	ˈtʰámːɛ̀
Zargulla	bizzó	námʔa	háidts	ʔoídd	ʔišíčč	ʔizíp	laáp	lakkúče	tansíne	támm
Basketo (1)	péttɑ́n or péttí (as modifier)	nɑ̀mʔí	hɑ̀izzí	òiddí	ìʃʃín	lèhí	tɑ̀bzɑ́	lɑ̀mɑ́hɑ́i ~ lɑ̀mɑ́kɑ́i	sɑ̀ɑkɑ̀lí ~ sɑ̀ɑkìlí	tɑ́ɓɓɑ́
Basketto (2)	pʰɜtʰːɜn	nɑmʔi	ɑjdzi	ojdi	ɪʃːɪn	lɜhi	tɑbzɑ	lɑmɑkʰɑj	sɑːkʰɑli	tɑʔɓɑ
Anfillo (Southern Mao)	ikkó	ɡuttó	kedzó	auddó	amittó (loan from Semitic)	ʃirtó	ʃabattó (loan from Semitic)	ʃimittó (loan from Semitic)	yiriŋɡó	aʃiró (loan from Semitic)
Boro (Shinasha) (1)	íka	ɡitá	kééza	áwəddá	utsá	ʃərə́ta	ʃawáta	ʃəmə́ta	dʒeɗija	tátsa
Boro (Shinasha) (2)	íkka / íkkà	ɡittá / ɡíttà	keːzá / keezá	áwddá / aẃddà	uːsá / uttsá	šerita / širrᵊtà	šawáta / šawaatà	šimíta / šəmmətà	ǰeːriyá / yeːriyá / jeedíyà	tása / tattsá
Shekkacho (Mocha)	ikka	ɡuttaa	keejjaa	awuddaa	uuččaa	širittaa	šabaattaa	šimittaa	yitʼiyaa	aširaa
