= Gamo-Gofa-Dawro language =

Ometo dialect continuum spoken in Ethiopia

Gamo-Gofa-Dawro
- Native to: Ethiopia
- Region: Omo Region
- Ethnicity: Gamo, Gofa, Dawro
- Native speakers: 1.6 million of Gamo, 360,000 of Gofa, 510,000 of Dawro (2007–2018)
- Language family: Afro-Asiatic: Omotic; North Omotic; Ometo; North; Gamo-Gofa-Dawro
- Writing system: Ethiopic, Latin

Language codes
- ISO 639-3: Variously: gmv – Gamo gof – Gofa dwr – Dawro
- Glottolog: gamo1243 Gamo gofa1235 Gofa dawr1236 Dawro

Gamo-Gofa-Dawro is an Ometo dialect continuum of the Afroasiatic family (Te-Ne-Omotic according to Glottolog) spoken in the Dawro, Gamo Gofa and Wolayita Zones of the Southern Nations, Nationalities, and Peoples' Region in Ethiopia. Varieties are spoken by the Gamo, Gofa, Dawro; Blench (2006) and Ethnologue treat these as separate languages. Zala presumably belongs here as well. Dialects of Dawro (Kullo-Konta) are Konta and Kucha. In 1992, Alemayehu Abebe collected a word-list of 322 entries for all three related dialects.

== Phonology ==
Segmentally, Gamo phonology operates with a system of twenty-six consonants and five vowel qualities, and in nearly every case a segment may occur short or long.

Consonants in Gamo language
		Labial	Dental		Palatal	Velar	Laryngeal
Stops	Glottalized	p’	ɗ	ts’	tʃʼ ⟨čʼ⟩	k’	ʔ
Stops	Voiced	b	d	dz	dʒ ⟨j⟩	g	
Stops	Voiceless	p	t	ts	tʃ ⟨č⟩	k	
Fricatives	Voiced			z			
Fricatives	Voiceless			s	ʃ ⟨š⟩		h
Sonorants	Nasals	m	n		ɲ ⟨ň⟩		
Sonorants	Lateral		l				
Sonorants	Vibrant		r				
Sonorants	Glides	w			j ⟨y⟩		

Vowels sound in Gamo language

	palatal		round
high	i		u
mid	e		o
low		a	

(Reference page 21/22)

== Morphology ==
=== Noun plural ===
The morphology of plural making in Gamo is straightforward and uniform.

In masculine nouns, plural is marked by means of a suffix -t, affixed to the oblique case form. The oblique is also the base for the suffixation of definiteness marking.

Examples of masculine plurals
Gloss	Absolutive singular	Oblique singular	Absolutive plural
'dog'	kaná	kaná	kanatá
'man'	addé	addé	addetá
'thing'	yóó	yóó	yóotá
'tear'	apúntsi	apúntsa	apúntsata

Feminine nouns take a suffix -int to form their plurals. This is affixed to the absolutive singular:

Examples of feminine plurals
Gloss	Absolutive singular	Absolutive plural	Nominative	Oblique
'sister'	miččó	miččointa	miččóinti	miččointa

(Reference page 81)

=== Adjectives ===
By comparison with certain other languages of Ethiopia, Gamo has a large vocabulary of adjectives. Like nominals, adjectives fall into declension classes, and although, being adjectives, they do not inflect for nominative case and there is no agreement within the phrase for number or definiteness, the declensional differences relating to oblique case marking do appear in U-declension adjectives when they function attributively.

The correlation between which particular TV an adjective has and its membership of a declension class appears to hold exactly as in nouns; thus, adjectives having a TV-o are always S-declension, adjective having a TV-i are always U-declension, while those having the TVs-a and -e are distributed between the two declensions, although almost all are S-declension.

Example;

absolutive	oblique	declension	gloss
hó'o	hó'o	S-declension	hot
páč'e	páč'e	S-declension	incomplete, not full
č'áač'a	č'áač'a	S-declension	fried, roasted
bóottsi	bóottsa	U-declension	white
góošši	góošša	U-declension	mad
kaušé	kaušá	U-declension	light-in weight

(Reference page 150)

=== Adjective and noun agreement ===
In the definite noun phrases where the noun is modified by an adjective the definite marker does not shift to the adjective, but remains on the noun

Example:

Gita mittsai kundides
big.OBL tree.M-DEF fall.PF-3M
The big tree fell down

Boottsa miizati haik'k'ida
white.OBL cow.PL-DEF.NOM die.PF-3PL
The white cows died

(Reference page 151)

=== Adverbs ===
Adverbial notion however, can be expressed in a wide variety of ways. In terms of syntactic constructions the two most frequent means of expressing adverbial notions are postpositional phrases and converbial clauses.

A number of verb lexemes contain some intrinsic reference to temporal or spatial features. Thus,

Examples:

1. gam’-‘~k’am’-‘ ‘be(come)/last a long time’
2. giddotsiss-‘ ‘stay late’
3. na’at-‘ ‘act childishly’
4. minétt- ‘act bravely’
5. miizat- ‘behave naively
6. godat-‘ ‘behave in a masterly way

Other more examples

K’uma katso wontara oikkadus
Lunch cook-VNO dawn OBL+PP(-ra) start.PF-3F
She started cooking lunch very early in the morning

Zilaittsape oikkidi isti k’otara kiitetettes
Last-year.OBL+PP(-ppe) begin.PF.CVB.3PL.PRON.NOM secret.OBL+PP(-ra)send-a-message-to-one-another.IMPF-3PL
Since last year they have been corresponding secretly.

(Reference page 300)

=== Postpositions ===
Gamo has very few postpositions; my analysis recognizes just six;

(-n), (-s), (-ppe), (-kko), (-ra) and (-u).

Phonologically, these are fairly minimal and in all cases their phonological structure obliges them to occur as attachments to other words.

There are however, instances where a postposition attaches to other clitic elements, such as to the inclusivity marker (-kka) or to the hypotheticality marker (-kko).

Example

Awokkonka demmakad
LOC.INT.PRON + UNI.E+PP(-N)+INCL find.IMPF-2SG-NEG
You won't find (it) anywhere at all

Banga buuts'an keettse kammadis
barley.OBI straw.OBL+PP(-n)house cover.PF-SG
I thatched a house with barley straw

The range of senses for the postposition (-s) may not appear to be quite so extensive but perhaps this is because English itself uses the preposition "for" so widely

Example;

Ne butaletappe taas dičča
2SG.DET puppy.PL-DEF+PP(-ppe) 1SG.DET.JN-OBL+PP(-s) rear.IMPT-2SG
Bring up one of your puppies for me

(Reference page 155)

=== Pronouns ===
Personal pronouns have long and short forms, but while, for most of them, the short form can clearly be identified with the leftmost portion of the long form, in the 3rd person singular pronouns the short form consists of the rightmost portion of the long form.

Example:

	verb complement		clause subject		noun phrase modifier	
	long	short	long	short	long	short
1Sg	tána	-	táni	tá	-	tá
2Sg	néna	-	néni	né	-	né
1Pl	nứna	-	nứni	nứ	-	nứ
2Pl/Pol	íntena	-	ínteni	ínte	-	ínte
3M	íza	a	ízi	í	íza	a
3F	ízo	o	íza	á	ízi	i
3pl/Pol	ísta	-	ísti	-	ísta	-

(Reference page 99)

=== Negation of verb ===
Negation in all subordinate clauses employs the simple-base with (-onta), which is also the form that functions in converbial negation. Since this form shows no agreement with its clause subject, the 'same subject': 'changed subject' marking which distinguishes converbial from subordinate clauses is neutralized. This situation is apparent in sentences (a - c). In other cases a subordinate clause status is made clearer periphrastically by the addition of the perfect or imperfect forms of the inherently negative verb (-agg).

Examples:

Na'ita č'oo-gissonta haasa'oi hanenna
child.PL-DEF cause-to-shut-up.SUB.NEG have-a-conversation.infO.NOM be-possible.ImpF-3M-NEG
Without (someone) making the children shut up, it's not possible to have a conversation

Iza zore siyo itts' onta muumi godoltsida
3F.PRON advice hear-VNO refuse.SUB.NEG remain-silent.3PL cause-a-disaster.PF-3PL
Remaining silent (at the time) when she would not have refused to listen to advice, they allowed her to get into a real disaster

Ta šammonta aggi-šin uyees!
1SG.DET]N buy.SUB.NEG fail.1.IMPF.SUB-DS drink.IMPF-3M
He drinks when I don't buy it!

(Reference page 266)

== Numerals ==
In Gamo, the counting forms are in general identical to the citation (absolutive) forms, except in the case of issinno ‘one’, for which a variant form ista can be used.

Numeral	absolutive	nominative	oblique
1	issinnó ~ istá	issinnóì ~ isstóì	issί
2	nam’á ~ na’’á	nam’áì ~ nam’ί	nam’ί
3	heeddzá	heeddzί	heeddzί
4	oiddá	oiddí	oiddí
5	iččáča ~ iččáč	iččáci	iččáč
6	usúppuna ~ usúppun	usúppuni	usúppun
7	láappuna ~ laappun	láappuni	láappun
8	όspuna ~ όspun	όspuni	όspun
9	uddúpuna ~ uddúpun	uddúpuni	uddúpun
10	támma	támmi	támmi
100	ts’eetá		
1000	kúma		

The forms denoting multiples of ten are based on tamma, which is preceded by the appropriate cardinal numeral in its pre-nominal oblique case form.

Examples

20 na’í	tamma~nam’í	tam~láatama
30 heeddzí	tamma~heeddzí	tam~heestama
40 oiddí	tamma~oiddí	tam~όitama
50 iččáč	tamma~iččáči	tamma
60 usúppun	tamma~usúppun	tam
70 láappun	tamma~láappun	tam
80 όspun	tamma~όspun	tam
90 uddúpun	tamma~uddúpun	tam

(Reference page 141)
