= Koore language =

Omotic language spoken in Ethiopia

Koorete
- Native to: Ethiopia
- Region: East of Lake Chamo
- Native speakers: 160,000 (2007 census)
- Language family: Afro-Asiatic: Omotic; North; Ometo; East; Koorete
- Writing system: Ethiopic, Latin

Language codes
- ISO 639-3: kqy
- Glottolog: koor1239

Koorete (also Amaarro, Amarro, Badittu, Koore, Koyra, Kwera, Nuna) is the language spoken by the Koore people of southern Ethiopia.

== Language definition ==
Koorete is an omotic language of the Afro-Asiatic linguistics. The omotic language family consists of around 25 to 30 languages or dialects, it is mostly divided into Eastern omotic and western omotic.

The Koorete belongs to the western omotic languages.

The western Omotic languages are divided into two branches, the Kafa-Gimojan languages and Maji languages.

== The people of Koorete language ==
Koore is the name of the people who are the native speakers of the Koorete Language. A member of the ethnic group is koore and by adding the suffix -te to the ethnic name we get the language name Koorete.

The Koorete Speakers are also known as Koyra, Badittu, Amarro and Nuna.

Most of the Koore people reside in the Amaaro mountains east of Lake Abbaya, Ethiopia. Koorete is also spoken on Gidicho Island in Lake Abbaya.

Most of the Koorete people are Christianity followers although there are some groups of traditional animist religion followers, they are in danger of extinction due to the spread of Christianity.

== Phonology ==
=== Consonants ===
		Labial	Alveolar	Postalveolar/ Palatal	Velar	Glottal
Plosive	voiceless	p	t		k	
Plosive	voiced	b	d		g	
Plosive	glottalic	ɓ	ɗ		kʼ	ʔ
Fricative	voiceless		s	ʃ		h
Fricative	voiced		z	ʒ		
Fricative	glottalic		sʼ	ʃʼ		
Nasal		m	n			
Rhotic			r			
Approximant		w	l	j		

- All consonants have geminated variants as well.
- Fricative consonants /s, z, sʼ, ʃ, ʒ, ʃʼ/ are realized as affricates [ts, dz, tsʼ, tʃ, dʒ, tʃʼ] when occurring in a consonant cluster, with the first member being /m, n, r, l/.
- /r/ is typically heard as a tap [ɾ] in lax form.
- Stops may also be aspirated as [pʰ, tʰ, (tsʰ), (tʃʰ), kʰ] in free variation.
- /p/ may be lenited as fricatives [ɸ, f] within consonant clusters.
- Implosives /ɓ, ɗ/ are heard as voiceless [ɓ̥ː, ɗ̥ː] when geminated.

=== Vowels ===
	Front	Central	Back
Close	i iː		u uː
Mid	e eː		o oː
Open		a aː	

== Koorete Language Alphabet ==
Alphabet Used	IPA (international Phonetic Alphabet)
p	p
t	t
s	s
sh	ʃ
k	k
h	h
b	b
d	d
z	z
zh	ʒ
g	g
bh	ɓ
dh	ɗ
s’	sʼ
sh’	ʃʼ
k’	kʼ
‘	ʔ
m	m
n	n
r	r
I	I
w	w
y	j

== Sentence structure ==
Koorete is an SOV language meaning it is a subject object verb language, but also using OSV (object subject verb) order does not lead to an ungrammatical structure.

Example: garma-i doro muu-d-o

Lion sheep eat

The lion ate a sheep

== Noun pluralization ==
The plural marker in the koorete language is -ita and because it starts with a vowel, all the nouns whether they end with a vowel or a consonant. The nouns will drop their final vowel and add the suffix -ita.

Singular	Plural
Ade = man	Ad-ita = men
Zawa = house	Zaw-ita = houses

=== Pluralization of animate nouns ===
There is another plural morpheme that is used for animate nouns which is -atse

==== Examples ====
Singular	Plural
Kana = dog	Kan-atse = dogs
Garma = lion	Garm-atse= lions
Müse = cow	Müse-atse = cows

The use of the plural suffix -atse is highly not acceptable with non-animate nouns.

=== Abstract nouns ===
In koorete language abstract nouns are created by adding the suffixes -unte or -ete

==== Examples ====
Noun	Abstract Noun
Kaate=king	Kaat-unte/ete=kingdom
Atse=person	Ats-unte/ete=humanity
Lagge=friend	Lagg-unte/ete=friendship

=== Agentive noun ===
A word or a noun that is derived from the verb that performs the action of the verb.it is formed by using the suffix -atse to verbs.

==== Example ====
verb	Derived noun
Wodh = kill	Wodh-atse = killer
Diz = write	Diz-atse = writer

Personal Pronouns in Koorete

	Nominative	Absolutive	possessive	dative	instrumental
1st sg	tan-i	Taa(tamba)	ta	Taa-sa	Taa-na
2nd sg	nen-i	Niya(nemba)	Ne	Nee-se	Nee-na
3rd male singular	es-i	es-a	E	Es-use	Es-una
3rd female singular	is-i	is-o	I	Is-use	Is-una
1st plural(excl)	nun-i	Nuu(numba)	Nu	Nuu-se	Nuu-na
1st plural (inclusive)	nin-i	Nii(nimba)	Ni	Nii-se	Nii-na
2nd plural	hinun-i	Hinu(mba)	Hi	Hinu-se	Hinu-na
3rd plural	us-i	Us-o	u	‘us-use	Us-una

==== Examples ====
1) Tan-i garma good-d-o

I chased a lion

2) Garma-I taa(tamba) good-d-o

A lion chased me

=== Interrogative pronouns ===
1)oon-I = who

2)oon-a = who

3)oone-se = to whom/whose

4)aba = what

5)am = what

6)aya = where

7)aya-pa = from where

8)aide = when

9)waidi = how

10)waara = how (in greetings)

11)aasawa = which

12)abasuw = why

13)aba bisha = what type

14)aba genno=how much

15)aba allo = how many

==== Examples ====
1)Oon-I maatse ush-sh-a

who milk drink

who drank milk?

2)waidi-(wa) I han-g-e

How 3rd fs go

How does she go?

=== Demonstrative Pronoun ===
In the Koorete Language we have demonstrative pronoun. The usage of them is determined by the location and the closeness of the referred item or thing also respecting the speaker or hearer and its visibility in the sentence structure.

· Wo = above a speaker

· Yede = below a speaker

· Ha = nearer to the speaker

· Se = far from the speaker and can be pointed at

· Ye = far from the speaker and cannot be pointed at, nearer to the listener.

Third-person personal pronouns are attached with the above mentioned demonstrative so that it can form a demonstrative pronoun.

==== Example ====
Ha‘ es-i = this (Masculine)

Ha‘ is-i= this (feminine)

Ha‘ us-i= these

=== Reflexive Pronouns ===
The Koorete language has a separate reflexive pronoun which is only in the third person, it is Biya or Bemba. The forms can be used alternatively. The pronouns have no difference between masculine/feminine and singular/plural forms.

==== Examples ====
Is-I biya/bemba os’-s’-o

She Ref.pronoun hit

She hit herself

=== Vocative Pronouns ===
Koorete language has a second person pronoun that is used when calling someone.

Do=you(Masculine)

Duwa-ite=you(Masculine plural)

Busshe=you (feminine)

Bunaish’ e=you (feminine plural)

Clauses

The koorete language has three clauses

-Relative Clause -Conditional Clause -Complement Clause

Relative Clause

It is the clause that modifies a noun and give us information about the person or thing mentioned.

==== Examples ====
Abeto-I woon-d-a doro-i malla-ko

Abeto buy sheep big

The sheep that Abeto bought is big.

Usually, the position of the relative clause in a noun sentence is to proceed the head element also switching the order will not lead to grammatical mistakes.

Doro-I abeto-I woon-d-o malla-ko

Sheep Abeto buy big

The sheep that Abeto bought is big.

In this sentence the relative clause comes after the head noun and the structure is grammatically correct.

=== Conditional Clause ===
The conditional clause in the koorete language is the suffix

-ete

==== Example ====
Ade-I bora woom-ete maatse in-g-u-wa

If the man buys bread, give him milk.

The suffix -ete is attached to the verb stem.

=== Complement Clause ===
A complement clause in the koorete language is -nike and it is shown as a suffix to the verb after the aspect and tense markers.

==== Example ====
Doro u woon-d-o-nike er-a-ko ta er-e

Sheep 3pl buy know 1sg know

I know that they bought a sheep

=== Koorete cases ===
1-Nominative case 2-Absolutive case 3-Genitive Case

4-Dative case 5-Allative case 6-Ablative case

7-Locative case 8-Comitative case 9-Instrumental case

Nominative case

It is shown in the form of Suffix -i. it is added to the end of the noun.

==== Example ====
Kana-i yoo-d-o

Dog come

A dog came

=== Absolutive case ===
The Absolutive case in the koorete language is usually unmarked. It can be shown as -o suffix

==== Example ====
garma-i adurr-I’-o bee-d-o

Lion cat see

A lion saw the small cat

=== Genitive case ===
It is shown as -i suffix and it appears only with nouns ending with consonant so it does not appear a lot since most of the nouns in koorete ends with vowel.

==== Example ====
Example: bush-i zawa

Girl-gen house

Girl’s house

Genitive can be used to describe possession, as for nouns ending with vowel the suffix -I cannot be used and to show the genitive case, it is shown by the word order possessor followed by possessed.

Example: indo zawa

Woman house

Woman’s house

The genitive case usage in Koorete language is not only to show possession but also to show other kinds of genitive relations like source, purpose, location, etc.

Example:

Tan-I amaro kam’o zal-dh-o

I Amaaro coffee sell

I sold coffee from Amaaro town.

=== Dative Case ===
It is used to show an indirect object in a sentence in the koorete language. It is shown by the morpheme -se.

Example:

Tan-i ade-se waatse in-d-o

I man water give

I gave water to a man

When adding the -se suffix to noun with consonant ending the suffix or morpheme will be -use.

Example:

Is-i ats-use katsa in-d-o

She person food give

She gave food to a person.

=== Allative Case ===
It is the case used to emphasize movement to or towards some location. The allative case is shown in the morpheme/suffix -me.

Example:

Is-i abeto-me soro in-d-o

She Abeto knife give

She passed the knife to Abeto.

As for the nouns that end with consonants the Allative suffix will be -ume.

Example: es-ume in-g-u-wa

Him give

Pass it to him

=== Ablative Case ===
It is shown in the form of -pa suffix. It give the meaning of “from”.

Example: koorusso-pa e yoo-d-o

Koorusso 3rd-mas-sing come

He came from Koorusso

In the nouns ending with consonants the suffix will be -apa.

Example:

is-i og-apa yoo-d-I gat-t-o ba-nni-ko

she road come be tired not exist

having come from a trip, she is not tired.

=== Instrumental case ===
It is shown in the suffix -na and it gives the meaning of “with”.

Example: is-i soro-na atsho burss-o

She knife meat cut

She cuts meat with a knife.

As for the nouns ending with consonants, the suffix will be -ina.

Example: ade-i shutsh-ina kana ish’-sh’-o

Man stone dog hit

A man hit a dog with a stone.

Locative case

It gives the meaning of ‘in’. There are two locative suffixes: -aka used for non-liquid and -a used for liquid.

Example: is-i zaw-aka utt-o

She house sit

She sat in a house

Ade-I be ma’o shoori-y-a sho-t-o

Man reflexive cloth river wash

A man washed his cloth in a river.

=== Comitative case ===
It is shown in the suffix -ara and gives the meaning of ‘with’.

Example: is-i doru-w-ara zawa yoo-d-o

She sheep house come

She came home with sheep.

== Bibliography ==
- Hayward, Richard. 1982. Notes on the Koyra Language. Afrika und Übersee 65: pp. 211–268.
- Mendisu, Binyam Sisay. 2010. Aspects of Koorete Verb Morphology. Köppe: Cologne.
- Theil, Rolf. 2011. Koorete segmental phonology. Journal of African Languages and Linguistics 32: pp. 275–306.
- Theil. Rolf. 2013. Koorete tonology. Pp. 167–174 in: Proceedings of the 5th International Conference on Cushitic and Omotic Languages, Paris, 16–18 April 2008. Rüdiger Köppe Verlag.
