= Hamer Bena =

Coordinates: 5°10′N 36°40′E

Hamer Bena was one of the 77 woredas in the Southern Nations, Nationalities, and Peoples' Region of Ethiopia. Part of the Debub Omo Zone, Hamer Bena was bordered on the south by Kenya, on the southwest by Kuraz, on the northwest by the Usno River which separates it from Selamago, on the north by Bako Gazer, on the northeast by the Konso special woreda, and on the east by the Oromia Region; the Weito River separated it from Konso and the Oromia Region and the Neri River defined part of the boundary with Bako Gazer. Hamer Bena included part of Lake Chew Bahir along its southeastern border. The administrative center was Dimeka; other towns in Hamer Bena included Arbore, Key Afer, and Turmi. Hamer Bena was separated for Hamer and Bena Tsemay woredas.

This woreda is located in part of the semi-arid lowlands which support agro-pastoral groups who are at various stages of transition from nomadic to sedentary livelihoods. Part of the northwestern corner is included in the Mago National Park.

== Demographics ==
Based on figures published by the Central Statistical Agency in 2005, this woreda has an estimated total population of 84,293, of whom 42,077 were men and 42,216 were women; 4,171 or 4.95% of its population are urban dwellers, which is less than the Zone average of 8.5%. With an estimated area of 8,850.94 square kilometers, Hamer Bena has an estimated population density of 9.5 people per square kilometer, which is less than the Zone average of 21.1.

In the 1994 national census Hamer Bena had a population of 59,181, of whom 29,614 were men and 29,567 women; 2,303 or 3.89% of its population were urban dwellers. The five largest ethnic groups reported in this woreda were the Hamer (70.36%), the Tsamai (14.21%), the Arbore (5.77%), the Aari (5.18%), and the Amhara (2.07%); all other ethnic groups made up 2.41% of the population. Hamer was spoken as a first language by 71.4% of the inhabitants, 13.2% spoke Tsamai, 5.79% spoke Arbore, 5.13% spoke Aari, and 2.61% spoke Amharic; the remaining 1.87% spoke all other primary languages reported. The Hamer people have their homeland in the western part, the Arbore in the eastern, and the Tsamai live in the northeastern; the remaining members of Birale people live in a few villages within the territory of Hamer people. Other groups dwelling in Hamer Bena who were not counted in the 1994 national census, yet mentioned in the report of a UNDP officer, were the Banna people and Kara peoples. Concerning education, 3.4% of the population were considered literate. Concerning sanitary conditions, about 58% of the urban and 5% of the total had toilet facilities.
