= Kwegu people =

Nilo-Saharan ethnic group in Ethiopia

Kwegu
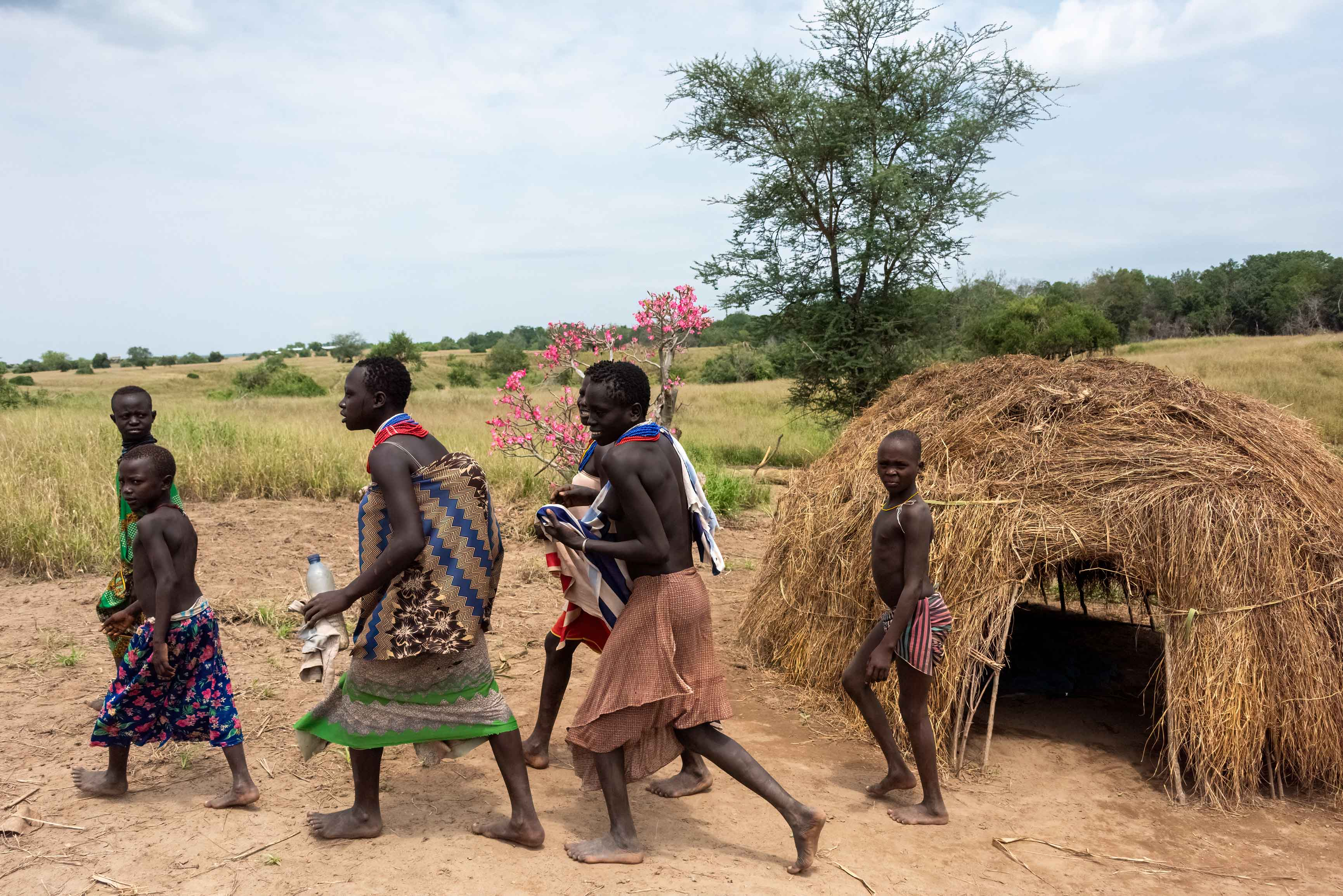
- A group of kwegu people in Ethiopia (2019)

Regions with significant populations
- Ethiopia

Languages
- Kwegu

Religion
- Animist (56%) and Christianity (44%)

Related ethnic groups
- Surmic peoples

The Kwegu are an ethnic group that lives on the western banks of the Omo River in the newly formed South Ethiopia Region. Some members of the Kwegu also live on the eastern banks of the river among the Mursi. Previously they were hunter-gatherers, but today they are engaged in a mixed economy of hunting, farming, beekeeping, and fishing.

== Demography and Population ==
Based on the Ethiopian 2007 housing and population census, the total population of the Kwegu is 1,974, of which 1,595 live in the Nyangatom district, whereas the remaining live in different regions and areas of Ethiopia. Of the total population, 1,435 are rural residents, whereas the remaining 539 are urban residents.

They are known by different names among their neighbors. For instance, they are called Muguji by the Kara, Nyidi by the Mursi and the Surma, Yidi by the Bodi and Baachá by the Amhara. From a Kwegu perspective, these terms are often viewed as pejorative expressions attached to them by their neighbors and imply that they are poor people or a group of low-status minorities identified with hunting or honey gathering. For instance, the meaning of the Mursi name for the Kwegu, Nyidi, is "poor or cattleless people". The name Muguji implies the place where they first settled during their migration to the region. Although their neighbors called them by these different names, Kwegu is their preferred name for themselves.

== Location ==
Administratively, the Kwegu live in Nyangatom district. They share an administrative district with the Nyangatom and the Murle peoples of the Lower Omo Valley. This valley is a vast semi-arid region of Southwest Ethiopia with some unique features of biodiversity and a large number of distinct, indigenous agro-pastoral and fishing communities. More specifically, the Kwegu live on the bank of the Omo River and are known as riverine people. The Omo River is the largest water body available to the Kwegu; it flows southwards starting from the Ethiopian highlands and turns into Turkana Lake on the Ethiopia-Kenya border. The Kwegu use boats to cross the river, not only being skillful users of boats, but also expert boat builders. It is the only means of transportation that connects the Kwegu with their Mursi neighbors.

Based on the location of their settlements, the Kwegu can be classified into three groups: southern, central, and northern Kwegu. The southern settlements are near the Kara, Nyangatom, and Hamar peoples, the central settlements are close to the Mursi people, and their northern settlements are near the Bodi people.

Kuchuru is the largest Kwegu settlement with 120 households. This village is located at about 400 meters above sea level and 42 km from the administrative center of the Nyangatom district, Kangaten.

== Language ==
The language of the Kwegu is known as Kwegu and it belongs to the southeast Surmic group within the Surmic languages of the Nilo-Saharan language family. It is unique among the other Surmic languages due to the Kwegu's long history of contact with neighboring Omotic language speakers. Kwegu's vocabulary and grammar is primarily influenced by the Karo and the Mursi languages. Specifically, Kwegu shares 36% of its lexicon with the Mursi language and it has borrowed many words and some grammatical features from the Kara language.

Their language is unwritten and is considered an endangered language. Its use among Kwegu adults is declining, and many of them use the Mursi, Bodi or Karo language. The residents of Kwegu's southern villages also speak the Nyangatom language. The Kwegu are therefore multilingual and can speak the languages of their neighbors.

== Livelihood ==
In terms of livelihood, the Kwegu engage in various subsistence activities such as hunting, fishing, gathering, cultivation and beekeeping. Hunting is an everyday activity across all of the Kwegu villages. Although today they make a living in a variety of ways, the Kwegu define themselves and are defined by their neighbors as hunters. By comparison to other economic activities, they attach substantial cultural weight to hunting activities. Although their hunting activities are mainly based on trapping, sometimes they use guns acquired through trade with neighboring groups. Buffalo, kudu, hippopotamus, elephants, rhinoceros, and eland are among the hunted animals.

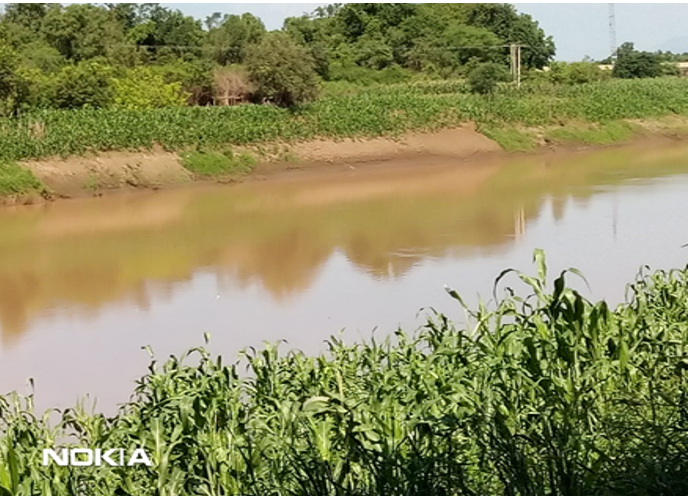
River bank cultivation

There is, however, substantial variation in subsistence across the different villages. For instance, nowadays the residents of the north and central villages have started to use slash and burn cultivation and riverbank and flood retreat cultivation after learning these from the Mursi and the Kara. The Kwegu use the fertile soil and silt provided by the Omo River to cultivate crops of sorghum, maize, and cowpeas.

The residents of the southernmost part of their territory raise goats and sheep, activities which they learned from the Nyangatom. Honey is viewed as another special product of the Kwegu. It is used both as a gift for bond-partners and as a commodity to obtain cash on the market. Fishing is another source of livelihood, providing the Kwegu with a diet rich in protein. As they do not breed cattle, the contribution of livestock to their subsistence is limited, but the relationship that they sustain with the Mursi enables them to get access to milk.

== Origin and History ==
The Kwegu consider themselves and are considered by their neighbors as the first people settling the area around the Omo River. According to Mursi oral traditions, the Kwegu occupied the Omo area long before the Mursi arrived. Likewise, the Karo say that the area where they have been living on the east side of the Omo River was previously occupied by the Kwegu. However, the Kwegu's assertion that they were the first inhabitants of the area does not imply that they have never lived elsewhere. The limited literature on the Kwegu suggests that they originated and migrated from other areas.

One origin myth indicates that they migrated from Arbore, an area to the east of the Omo River currently occupied by the Arbore people. During their migration from Arbore, the Kwegu initially settled on Muguji mountain. Being on the mountain, they were able to see the Omo River and sent a group of young people to visit the river and see if it is a good place to settle on. The young people were sent in different directions to bring information to help them select a location to settle. One of the groups went to the Nakwa area, and others to the Kuchuru area. Some of them stayed, whereas the others returned to Muguji mountain and informed the community about the Omo River, Nakwa, and Kuchuru areas.

Another origin myth indicates that the Birayle area, northeast of Arbore in the Bana-Tsemay District of the South Omo area, was their place of origin. The Kwegu left this location to avoid recurrent conflicts with neighboring communities. During their migration from Birayle via Arbore, they crossed the Omo River and settled in the Kuchuru area. While crossing the Arbore area, they were joined by the Baada, one of the Kwegu clans that according to this source claims its origin from Arbore. Other sources, however, argue that the group migrating with the Kwegu from Arbore was the Woreba clan, whereas the Baada clan was from areas currently occupied by the Bodi and Bacha.

A final origin myth indicates that the Kwegu came from different groups and locations. The Kwegu ancestors migrated to their present area primarily from the east, particularly from the Arbore area. Hunger forced them to leave the Arbore area, and a fish-eating bird guided them to a place called Mugunya, the last Hamar village, before crossing the Omo River. Other Kwegu clans are thought to come from the northern areas, fleeing an illness that Lewis and Woodburn suggest was sleeping sickness.

Further sources suggest different histories for the migration of the various Kwegu clans. Ynintso (2016) mentioned that the Garshma clan descended from the Aari (an agricultural Omotic-speaking people living to the northeast of the Kwegu) and first settled at a current village called Marsha on the Omo River's eastern bank before migrating to Kuchuru, a place across the river. The Woreba clan is believed to have descended from the Arbore people and first settled in Mugunya, Nakure, and Woreba area in what is today Dus village. Due to conflicts with the Karo, the Woreba clan relocated from Dus to Galgida in the Nyangatom area in the late 1980s. The Baada clan is thought to have descended from the Bodi and Bacha groups further north; they first lived at the Makule area, joined the Garshma clan at the Qalo area, and finally relocated to Kuchuru with them. Matsuda (2008) indicates that the Duuyu and Adara groups migrated from the Mursi, the Baada from the Bodi, the Dukule from the Aari, and the Woreba from the Arbore. Although these accounts vary slightly in terms of the names of the original migrants and whether they represent clans, the presentations of the ethnogenesis of the Kwegu are relatively consistent with each other.

== Inter-Ethnic Relations ==
Over sixteen different ethnolinguistic groups exist in the South Omo area. They belong to three language families: Nilo-Saharan (Bodi, Kwegu, Murle, Mursi, and Nyangatom ethnic groups), Omotic (Aari, Banna, Bashada, Dime, Hamar, Karo, and Maale ethnic groups), and Cushitic (Arbore, Birayle, Dassanech, and Tsamai ethnic groups). Their subsistence systems vary considerably and range from agriculture and pastoralism to hunting-gathering. In this diverse region, the history of multiple forms of intergroup relationships and interactions can be observed.

The Kwegu have had a long history of interactions with the Mursi, Karo, Nyangatom, Hamar, and Bodi people. Kwegu relationships with more powerful ethnic groups in their immediate neighborhood are very important, especially as a way to ensure their security. The relationships with Kwegu residents of different areas (South, Central and North) do not appear to be as important as their relationships with neighboring ethnic groups that provide protection.

The Kwegu neighbors are more numerous and politically powerful than the Kwegu are themselves. Their neighbors are heavily armed with modern weapons that are used in periodic conflicts with each other. In this context of conflict, the Kwegu are treated by their neighbors as a relatively weak and low-status minority group. They also do not keep a large number of cattle to avoid conflicts with their aggressive neighbors over cattle raiding. Cattle raiding is common to many ethnic groups in the Lower Omo Valley, and owning cattle requires the group to be strong enough to protect their cattle from raiders. Avoiding cattle is one strategy that small ethnic groups use to avoid possible conflict with powerful neighbors in the region. Due to their minority status, the Kwegu try to maintain peaceful relationships with their neighbors. The following sections describe the nature of their relationships with some of their neighbors.

=== Kwegu-Mursi Relation ===
Although they perceive themselves as different, the Kwegu have strong ties with the Mursi, although the Mursi dominate the Kwegu. Their interactions can be characterized as a dyadic patron-client relationship. The clients (Kwegu) provide the patrons (Mursi) with meat, ivory, leopard skins, honey, cleared cultivation sites, and boat services, whereas the patrons offer their clients cattle they use to pay bride prices during marriage arrangements.

The Kwegu are marginalized by the Mursi, whereas their products (honey, meat, skin, and ivory) and skills (hunting and captaining boats) are highly desired. The film The Kwegu: Disappearing World, produced in 1982, also reveals the unbalanced relationship between the Mursi and the Kwegu in their everyday life. A factor that contributes to this inequality is the fact that the Kwegu do not own cattle. In the eyes of the Mursi, this is why the Kwegu are viewed as inferior, as cattle are one of the primary status markers in the region. But the Mursi do not allow the Kwegu to keep cattle due to the believe that the close contact between the Kwegu and the cattle is harmful to the Mursi cattle. Other factors that influence the Mursi's dominance are that the Kwegu population is relatively small, and that they have little access to automatic rifles, which the Mursi acquire through the sale of cattle. Although people in the Lower Omo Valley have had a long history of access to firearms, automatic weapons have only become available in exchange for cattle during the past decades.

Though the Kwegu-Mursi economic and social relations are extensive, inter-marriage and sexual relation between the two is considered taboo. Part of the explanation is that Kwegu men cannot pay the bride price (paid in cattle) required to marry Mursi women. The Mursi also denounce such relations because they believe that marrying or having sexual intercourse with the Kwegu will cause cattle death. Thus, the line of difference and marginalization comes from differences in language, subsistence and the strict marriage practices that Turton described as defining superiority or inferiority in a cultural sense. Though they have superior hunting and boat skills, the Kwegu are considered culturally inferior by the Mursi. Although the Kwegu are proud of their boating and hunting skills, current studies indicate that the Kwegu do not contradict the Mursi's dogma that herding is superior, and that in their relationship, Mursi and Kwegu are always conscious of their differences.

=== Kwegu-Karo Relation ===
Although the Kwegu had strong ties with the Karo and their history is inseparably entwined, their relationship resembles the Kwegu-Mursi patron-client relationship. These interactions are exhibited through the belmo relationship. Belmo is a bond-friendship that the Kwegu establish with other individuals from their own community or neighboring groups. Although the belmo relationship binds them, the Kwegu and Karo maintain boundaries along different lines: marriage, sexual relations, drinking and food culture. Their close relationships collapsed after a 1988 violent conflict; the Kwegu broke off their connections with the Karo and forged a new political-economic relationship with the Nyangatom.

=== Kwegu-Nyangatom Relation ===
Unlike to the other two ethnic groups, the Nyangatom have a relatively open relationship with the Kwegu. The Nyangatom do not consider the Kwegu as "others," and intermarriage is not taboo. The Nyangatom take pride in protecting vulnerable groups against strong enemies and kept their ethnic boundaries open for those Kwegu seeking protection. In return, they received access to the local resources, such as grazing land for their cattle in Kwegu territories. In terms of population, political representation, economic and military strength, however, the Kwegu community is a minority in the Nyangatom District. Fewer studies have been conducted on the Kwegu-Nyangatom relationship.

== Genetic Evidence ==
The above ethnographic accounts show the history of contact between Nilo-Saharan and Afro-Asiatic language families in the Lower Omo Valley of southwest Ethiopia. The genetic evidence, however, shows that Nilo-Saharan speakers in southwest Ethiopia are genetically closer related to Bantu and Nilotic speakers than to the Afro-Asiatic speakers to their northeast. Still, the existing genetic evidence reflects the recent intermixing of Nilo-Saharan speakers with other Ethiopians. Except for the Nilo-Saharan speaking Kwegu (approximately 1500 years ago) and Me'en (>1400 years ago), the inferred admixture occurrences in groups with ancestry linked to Bantu and Nilotic speakers are dated to <1100 years ago.

== Social Organization ==
=== Clan and Territorial Organization ===
The Kwegu have seven major clans: Garshma, Worba, Mersha, Shamargo, Arkol, Dhoyo and Baada and five local groups that make the Kwegu: the Baada, Duuyu, Adara, Woreba, and Dukule. Their settlement is distributed in the riverine forest to the west of the Omo River. Four to seven families cluster in the tiny hamlets, but they form larger groups during conflict times in order to defend themselves against possible attacks by their enemies.

=== Marriage ===
In terms of marriage, the Kwegu practice clan exogamy. Arranged marriage is preferred, but it is often based on the preference of a man and a woman. The involvement of parents from both groom and bride families comes after the couple has agreed to marry. An abduction is an unacceptable form of marriage among the Kwegu.

=== Traditional Administration ===
Their traditional administration involves a politico-religious position. The title of their traditional leader is emunukapen followed by penkagudli. The duties of the people in these positions range from administrative (conflict resolution, reconciliation, setting rules) to spiritual activities related to the restoration of wellbeing and eradication of illness.

=== Bond partnership ===
Another dimension of social organization among the Kwegu is the belmo bond partnership mentioned above. Each Kwegu man establishes belmo partnerships both within and outside of their group. Sometimes such a relationship is established along kin-lines and passed over to the next generation. The exchange between belmo partners is a kind of generalized reciprocity in which the value of the gift and the return are not equivalent. The belmo relationship is also honored upon the death of one of the partners by shooting the gun and joining the deceased family in expressing condolences and sympathy.
