= Bako Gazer =

Coordinates: 5°55′N 36°35′E

Bako Gazer is one of the woredas in the South Ethiopia Regional State. It is also called Southern Aari as it is part of the homeland of Aari people. Part of the Debub Omo Zone, Bako Gazer is bordered on the south by Bena Tsemay, on the west by the Mago River which separates it from Selamago, on the north by the Basketo special woreda and Gelila, on the northeast by the Gamo Gofa Zone, and on the east by Male. The administrative center of this woreda is Tolta; other town in Bako Gazer include Wub Hamer. Gelila and Male woredas were separated from Bako Gazer.

Bako Gazar wereda, around the zonal capital of Jinka, is located in the intensively cultivated middle altitudes, and could be said to mark the south-western limits of the traditional Ethiopian highland ox-plough agriculture. The highest point in the woreda is Mount Mago (2528 meters). Rivers include the Maki. The Mago National Park covers part of the southwestern corner between the Mago and Neri Rivers. According to a 2004 report, Bako Gazer had 59 kilometers of all-weather roads and 84 kilometers of dry-weather roads, for an average road density of 33 kilometers per 1000 square kilometers.

== Demographics ==
Based on the 2007 Census conducted by the CSA, this woreda has a total population of 210,557, of whom 103,773 are men and 106,784 women; 30,974 or 14.71% of its population are urban dwellers. The majority of the inhabitants were Protestants, with 47.05% of the population reporting that belief, 23.93% practiced traditional beliefs, 23.19% practiced Ethiopian Orthodox Christianity, and 1.72% were Muslim.

In the 1994 national census Bako Gazer had a population of 206,913, of whom 104,286 were men and 102,627 women; 17,527 or 8.47% of its population were urban dwellers. The five largest ethnic groups reported in this woreda were the Aari (66.5%), the Male (21.34%), the Amhara (7.82%), the Goffa (1.12%), and the Basketo (0.93%); all other ethnic groups made up 2.29% of the population. Aari was spoken as a first language by 67.14% of the inhabitants, 21.67% spoke Male, 8.57% spoke Amharic, 0.82% spoke Basketo, and 0.81% spoke Gofa; the remaining 0.99% spoke all other primary languages reported. Concerning education, 13.5% of the population were considered literate. Concerning sanitary conditions, about 71% of the urban and 13% of the total had toilet facilities.
