= Selamago =

District in the South Ethiopia Regional State

Coordinates: 5°55′N 36°05′E

Selamago is a woreda in the South Ethiopia Regional State. Part of the South Omo Zone, Selamago is bordered on the south by Nyangatom, on the west and north by the Omo River which separates it from the Bench Maji, Keffa and Konta, on the northeast by the Gamo Gofa, on the east by the Basketo and Bako Gazer, and on the southeast by the Usno River which separates it from Bena Tsemay; the Mago River defines part of the boundary with Bako Gazer. The administrative center of Selamago is Hana.

== Overview ==
The highest point in this woreda is Mount Smith (2560 meters); other notable peaks include Mount Dara. Rivers in this woreda include the Hana. The southern part of Selamago along the Mago and Usno rivers, a length of about 20 kilometers, is included in the Mago National Park. To the north of it is Tama Wildlife Reserve. According to a 2004 report, Selamago had no all-weather roads and 185 kilometers of dry-weather roads, for an average road density of 44 kilometers per 1000 square kilometers.

David Turton describes this area as one of the most isolated in Ethiopia: the Omo and Mago rivers make access difficult and the conquering armies of Menelik II bypassed it. Although the occupying Italians briefly occupied a military post along the Omo in what later became Selamago in 1940, it was not until the 1970s that direct Ethiopian administration reached this area.

== Demographics ==
Based on the 2007 Census conducted by the CSA, this woreda has a total population of 27,866, of whom 14,085 are men and 13,781 women; 1,233 or 4.43% of its population are urban dwellers. The majority of the inhabitants practiced traditional beliefs, with 45.41% of the population reporting that belief, 30.54% were Protestants, and 12.36% practiced Ethiopian Orthodox Christianity.

In the 1994 national census Selamago had a population of 13,608, of whom 6,675 were men and 6,933 women; 397 or 2.92% of its population were urban dwellers. The five largest ethnic groups reported in this woreda were the Dime (39.23%), the Bodi otherwise known as the Me'en (33.07%), the Mursi (22.94%), the Amhara (2.2%), and the Basketo (1.26%); all other ethnic groups made up 1.3% of the population. Dime was spoken as a first language by 40.39% of the inhabitants, 33.07% spoke Me'en, and 22.94% spoke Mursi; the remaining 3.6% spoke all other primary languages reported. A 1996 UNDP report states that the "Bodi" and "Dimi" peoples were not counted in the 1984 census. One group who were missed were the Kwegu, whose villages can be found along the Omo River; they may have been counted as belonging to the Mursi. Concerning education, 5.77% of the population were considered literate. Concerning sanitary conditions, about 80% of the urban inhabitants and 9% of the total had toilet facilities.
