= Ongota language =

Moribund unclassified language of Ethiopia

Ongota
- Birale
- Pronunciation: /iːfa ʕoŋɡota/
- Native to: Ethiopia
- Region: Southern Omo Zone, Southern Region
- Ethnicity: 115 Ongota (2012)
- Native speakers: 12 (2012)
- Language family: unclassified (possibly a language isolate)

Language codes
- ISO 639-3: bxe
- Glottolog: bira1253
- ELP: Ongota
- Ongota is classified as Critically Endangered by the UNESCO Atlas of the World's Languages in Danger.

Ongota (also known as Birale, Birayle) is a moribund language of southwest Ethiopia. UNESCO reported in 2012 that out of a total ethnic population of 115, only 12 elderly native speakers remained, the rest of their small village on the west bank of the Weito River having adopted the Tsamai language instead. The default word order is subject–object–verb. The classification of the language is obscure (Sava & Tosco 2015).

== History of the people ==
Oral history of the Ongota tells that they originated from a number of different populations from Dikinte, Maale and Arbore among others. During a stay in Maale territory, which today lies at their north, the collection of clans were chased south due to their hunting of Maale livestock. They followed the banks of the Weito River until they reached the Arbore, where they were turned away back north and settled where they are today. This account differs from that of the Maale, who claim that the Ongota were originally a part of the Maale who migrated and did not return.

The first European mention of the Ongota people was in the late 1800s, when they were vaguely mentioned in a travel guide. The next mention was in the mid 1980s when English linguist Harold Fleming recorded 60 words of the language, which seemed to have little resemblance to nearby languages. In 1991 Harold Fleming visited the Ongota, recording a population of 89, of whom only 14 spoke the language. He believed the language to be an ancient branch of the Afro-Asiatic linguistic family. He said that the people use bows and arrows and avoid guns. The men would usually marry outside of the group and the children would often not speak Ongota.

== Classification ==
Ongota has features of both Afroasiatic and Nilo-Saharan languages that confuse its classification, and linguists and anthropologists have been unable to clearly trace its linguistic roots so far. Five broadly different classifications have been suggested:

- a language isolate (Cushiticist Maarten Mous, as well as Dimmendaal and Güldemann);
- a Cushitic language with a Nilo-Saharan substratum (Lionel Bender, Savà and Tosco (2003, 2007));
- an independent branch of Afroasiatic (Fleming 2006);
- a Nilo-Saharan language with intensive borrowing from the Cushitic language Tsʼamakko (Václav Blažek);
- a pidginized creole (Aklilu Yilma of Addis Ababa University).

Savà and Tosco (2007) argue that what little Ongota morphology that has been collected is either Tsʼaamakko or unique. They also note Aklilu's "conclusion is strengthened by a local legend stating that Ongota originated from a multiethnic melting pot."

Bonny Sands (2009) believes Savà and Tosco's proposal to be the most convincing proposal. Sava & Tosco (2015) leave it unclassified, possibly an isolate but possibly so affected by superstrate influence that the original affiliation of the language has been obscured.

== Decline ==
The main mechanism behind the decline of Ongota is marriage with other communities. In a brief expedition in the early 1990s, a number of researchers made the observation that many Ongota men married Tsamakko women. The child would grow up speaking only the mother's language, but not the father's. (Mikesh, P. et al., 1992–1993) This trend has continued through recent years.

== Phonology ==
Consonants
	Labial	Alveolar	Palatal	Velar	Uvular	Pharyngeal	Glottal
Plosive	b	t d		k g	q		ʔ
Implosive		ɗ		ɠ			
Affricate		ts	tʃ dʒ				
Fricative	f	s z	ʃ		χ	ħ ʕ	h
Nasal	m	n					
Approximant	w	r, l	j				

Vowels
	Front	Central	Back
High	i iː		u uː
Mid	e eː		o oː
Low		a aː	

Additionally, Ongota distinguishes between high and low tone.

== Lexicon ==
By far the largest number of parallels in the documented Ongota lexicon is with Tsʼamakko, the local majority language that speakers have been shifting to, ca. 300 lexemes. The direction of borrowing, however, cannot be assumed to be always into Ongota. Much Tsʼamakko vocabulary with no known Cushitic origin, e.g. for animals or plants, could be instead newer or older borrowings from earlier Ongota.

Smaller groups of ca. 15 words each by the count of Blažek, are shared with other neighbors: Oromo, the major regional language, and its relatives; Aroid languages such as Hamar, spoken to the west of Ongota and Tsʼamakko; and North Omotic languages such as Maale and Wolayta, spoken to their north.

- Borrowings from Oromo: sarba 'calf of leg', harri 'donkey', arba 'elephant', wura 'house' (Borana Oromo worra 'family'), kinne 'insect' (Borana kinniisa 'bee'), sibila 'iron', meela 'leg', gaara 'mountain', olla 'village'.

Parallels with various languages classified as Nilo-Saharan number 44 according to Blažek.

=== Personal pronouns ===
The personal pronouns of Ongota show little similarity with Tsʼamakko or wider Cushitic, while some parallels can be found across Nilo-Saharan.

Pronouns	English	Ongota		Tsʼamakko	Parallels in Eastern Sudanic	Parallels in Central Sudanic	Parallels elsewhere in Nilo-Saharan
Pronouns	English	Full form	Subject form	Tsʼamakko	Parallels in Eastern Sudanic	Parallels in Central Sudanic	Parallels elsewhere in Nilo-Saharan
1st person singular	'I'	kaata	ka, kaa	ʔano obj. ʔee	Jumjum (West Nilotic) ékà	? Baledha kɔ́ 'we' (inclusive)	Saharan: Kanuri ki, Zaghawa (ɛ)gi Fur kà; Daju *aga; Koman *akʰa
1st person plural	'we'	joo, juuta	jo, ju	ʔine	Teso (East Nilotic) ɪs(y)ɔ́ɔ̀ – perhaps borrowed from Kuliak	Bagirmi jé(ge), Fongoro zey, Morokodo zɛ́, Kara zi	Saharan: Berti su-, sin Kuliak: Soo ísìà, Ik -isina Berta hàθáŋ; Daju *-aš-
2nd person singular	'you' ('thou')	jaame, janta	jaa	ʔato obj. koo m., kee f.	Nuer (West Nilotic) jín Proto-Lotuko-Maa (East Nilotic) *iyye	Bagirmi yì, Sara i	Fur jì
2nd person plural	'you'	giida, gidata	gida	ʔatunɗe obj. kune	Temein kiṭ Dinik (Nyima) igwo Longarim (Surmic) agíṭà	Kresh igî	Maban: Masalit kii, Aiki kìì, Kibet kì
3rd person sing. masculine	'he'	kita	ki, ke	ʔufo	Kalenjin (South Nilotic) 3P verb marker *-kV-	Proto-CS *kɛ 'he, she' Proto-CS *k- 3P subject marker Kresh ka 'that'	3P marker *k in Saharan, Soo
3rd person sing. feminine	'she'	kuta, kuʔi	ko, ku	ʔise	Kalenjin (South Nilotic) 3P verb marker *-kV-	Proto-CS *kɛ 'he, she' Proto-CS *k- 3P subject marker Kresh ka 'that'	3P marker *k in Saharan, Soo
3rd person plural	'they'	kiiʔe, kiʔita		ʔufunɗe	Kalenjin (South Nilotic) 3P verb marker *-kV-	Proto-CS *kɛ 'he, she' Proto-CS *k- 3P subject marker Kresh ka 'that'	3P marker *k in Saharan, Soo

=== Numerals ===
The numerals from '3' to '7' and '9' seem to be borrowed from Tsʼamakko, and they have clear parallels also in the other languages of the Dullay group. '1' and '2' seem to be borrowed from Aroid.

Numeral	Ongota	Tsʼamakko	other Dullay	Notes
1	akala	(dóókko)	(toʔo)	Not Cushitic. Similar to Dime (Aroid) ɔɔkɛl, Shilluk (Nilotic) akʸel.
2	lama	(lakkí)	(lákki)	From East Cushitic *lamm-, e.g. Oromo lama. Also borrowed into Aroid: Hamar and Kara lama.
3	zéha, zexa	zeeħ	Harso ezzaħ, Gol. izzéħ	From East Cushitic *sizħ-.
4	talaha, talaxa	sálaħ	Harso and Gollango salaħ	Also in Highland East Cushitic (e.g. Sidamo šoole) and Dahalo saʕála.
5	hobbe, hoppe	xóóbin	Harso xupin, Gol. hupin	Also in Yaaku xoopi.
6	tsanafa, sʼanafa	tábben	Harso cappi, Gol. tappi	Compareable if assuming metathesis from *tsafana in Ongota. No further Cushitic parallels.
7	taxanke	táħħan	Harso caħħan, Gol. taħħa	No further Cushitic parallels.
8	ʔiista, îsta	(sezzen)	(Harso sasse, Gol. sétte)	Perhaps from East Cushitic *sizħeet, but with different development to Tsʼamakko / Dullay. Structure most similar to Kambaata (Highland East) hezzeto < ? *ħiszeet.
9	gólanke	góllan	Harso kollan, Gol. kolla	No further East Cushitic parallels. Similar to South Cushitic: Iraqw gwalel, Kwʼadza gweli; and to Beja gaal '1'.
10	coma	(kúŋko)		No known origin. Similar to Gumuz gicuma '20'.
100	ɗiɓa	(mato)		From Oromo dhibba. (Tsʼamakko from Amharic.)

== See also ==
- Ongota word list (Wiktionary)
- South Omo

== Bibliography ==
- Fleming, Harold, 2002. "Ongota Lexicon: English-Ongota". Mother Tongue, VII, pp. 39–65.
- Fleming, Harold, 2006. Ongota: A Decisive Language in African Prehistory. – Wiesbaden : Harrassowitz. ISBN 3-447-05124-8
- Mikesh, P. et al., 1992–1993. "Ongota or Birale: a moribund language of Gemu-Gofa (Ethiopia)". Journal of Afroasiatic Languages, 3,3:181–225.
- Militarev, Alexander, 2005. "Towards the genetic affiliation of Ongota, a nearly-‐extinct language of Ethiopia." In ""Memoriae Igor M. Diakonoff"", by Leonin E. Kogan, (pp. 567-‐607). Winona Lake: Eisenbrauns.
- Sands, Bonny (2009). "Africa’s Linguistic Diversity". Language and Linguistics Compass 3/2 (2009): 559–580, 10.1111/j.1749-818x.2008.00124.x
- Savà, Graziano, 2003. "Ongota (Birale), a Moribund Language of Southwest Ethiopia." In ""Language Death and Language Maintenance: Theoretical, Practical and Descriptive Approaches"" by M. Janse, S. Tol, & V. Hendriks. Amsterdam: Benjamins.
- Savà, Graziano and Mauro Tosco 2000. A sketch of Ongota, a dying language of southwest Ethiopia. Studies in African Linguistics 29.2.59–136.
- Savà, Graziano and Mauro Tosco 2003. "The classification of Ongota". In Bender et al. eds, Selected comparative-historical Afrasian linguistic studies. LINCOM Europa.
- Savà, Graziano and Mauro Tosco 2007. Review article: HAROLD C. FLEMING, Ongota: a Decisive Language in African Prehistory. Aethiopica 10.
- Savà, Graziano and Mauro Tosco 2015. The Ongota language – and two ways of looking at the history of the marginal and hunting-gathering peoples of East Africa. Rivista annuale dell’associazione Ethnorêma XI - N. 11, pp. 1–18.
- Savà, Graziano, & Thubauville, Sophia, 2010. "The Ongota : a branch of the Maale?; ethnographic, historic and linguistic traces of contact of the Ongota people." In "To live with others: essays on cultural neighborhood in southern Ethiopia", edited by E. Gabbert, & S. Thubauville, (pp. 213‐235). Koln: Koppe.
