= Tsamai =

Tsamai may refer to:

- Tsamai language
- Tsamai people
