= Aari =

Aari or AARI may refer to:

- Aari (actor) (born 1985), Indian Tamil film actor
- Aari language, an Omotic language
- Aari people, an ethnic group from Ethiopia
- Aari work, a type of embroidery from India / Pakistan
- Arctic and Antarctic Research Institute, Russia

== See also ==
- "Aari Aari", a 2003 song by Bombay Rockers; remade by Shashwat Sachdev, Bombay Rockers, Khan Saab, Jasmine Sandlas, Sudhir Yaduvanshi, Reble and Token for the Indian film Dhurandhar: The Revenge (2026)
