= Male (woreda) =

Administrative division of Ethiopia

Maale is one of the woredas in the South Ethiopia Regional State. It is named after the Maale people who are living at this woreda. Part of the Debub Omo Zone, Maale is bordered on the south by Bena Tsemay, on the west by Bako Gazer, on the north by the Basketo special woreda and Gelila, on the north and east by the Gamo Gofa Zone, and on the southeast by the Dirashe special woreda. Maale was separated from Bako Gazer woreda. The administrative seat of this district is Lemogento.

== Demographics ==
Based on the 2007 Census conducted by the CSA, this woreda had a total population of 84,693, of whom 42,871 were men and 41,822 were women; 914 or 1.08% of its population were urban dwellers. The majority of the inhabitants practiced traditional beliefs, with 68.84% of the population reporting that belief, 19.01% were Protestants, and 3.89% practiced Ethiopian Orthodox Christianity.
