= Gelila (woreda) =

Coordinates: 6°11′N 36°39′E

Gelila is one of the woredas in the Southern Nations, Nationalities, and Peoples' Region of Ethiopia. It is also called Northern Aari as it is part of the homeland of Aari people. Part of the Debub Omo Zone, Gelila is bordered on the south by Bako Gazer, on the north by the Basketo special woreda, and on the east by the Gamo Gofa Zone. Gelila was separated from Bako Gazer woreda.

== Demographics ==
Based on the 2007 Census conducted by the CSA, this woreda has a total population of 67,431, of whom 33,367 are men and 34,064 women; 2,354 or 3.49% of its population are urban dwellers. The majority of the inhabitants were Protestants, with 51.7% of the population reporting that belief, 33.91% practiced traditional beliefs, 7.23% practiced Ethiopian Orthodox Christianity, and 1.48% were Catholic.
