= Dasenech =

Dasenech may refer to:

- Dasenech (woreda), a district of Southern Nations, Nationalities, and Peoples' Region, Ethiopia
- Dasenech language, or Daasanach, spoken by the Daasanach people in Ethiopia, South Sudan, and Kenya
