= Hamar people =

Omotic language-speaking ethnic group in southwestern Ethiopia

Hamer
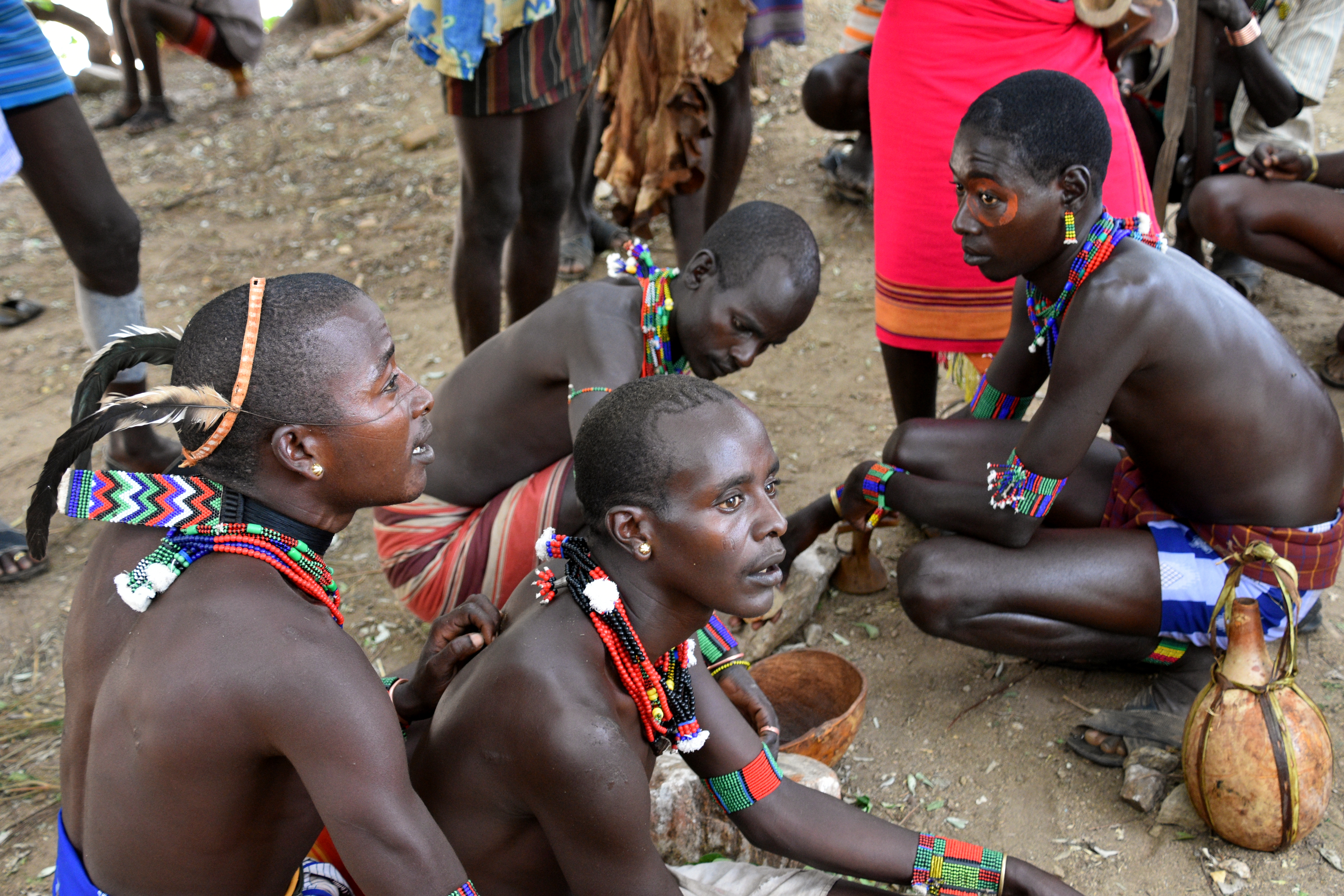

Total population
- 46,532

Regions with significant populations
- South Ethiopia Regional State

Languages
- Hamer

Religion
- Animism

The Hamar (also spelled Hamer) are rural-agropastoral community located in the mountainous and lowland areas of the Lower Omo Valley in Southern Ethiopia. They speak Hamar language, a South Omotic language. However, it is not taught in schools and not used in government institutions. They primarily engaged in livestock herding but also farming.

== Demography ==
The Hamar people are one of the largest groups in South Omo Zone of the South Ethiopia Regional State. The total population of the Hamar district is 64,925 with 32,600 male and 32,325 female. Of the total population, 61,227 of them live in rural area whereas 3,698 of them live in the town. The South Ethiopia Regional Statistical Report also shows that the population density of the Woreda is 11 person per km^{2} .

== Location ==
The Hamar people live on the eastern side of the Omo River in Hamar Woreda, located in the South Omo Zone with its administrative center at Dimeka. The woreda covers a total land area of 5,989.8 km^{2}. The annual temperature of the Woreda range from 17.6 °C to 27.5 °C, with an annual rainfall between 400 mm and 1,600 mm. The elevation varies from below 500 meters to as high as 2,000 meters above sea level. Their territory stretches from the Weito River in the east to the plains and hills of the lower Omo Valley in the west and to the north and northwest, it borders the lands of the Banna and Bashada, the other community living Hamar Woreda.

In terms of their relative location, the Hamar are bordered by the Arbore and Tsamai to the east, the Banna to the north, the Dasanech to the south, Lake Stephanie (Chew Bahir) to the southeast, and the Kara, Nyangatom, and the Omo River to the west.

== Basic infrastructure of the district ==
Hamar Woreda has 11 primary schools and one secondary school. The woreda's healthcare infrastructure includes three health centers and 20 health posts, providing essential medical services to the community. Additionally, a paved road runs through the woreda, connecting Hamar with neighboring communities.

== Livelihood ==
The Hamar people are predominantly pastoralist and engage in livestock keeping. Their livestock includes cattle, goat and sheep. More recently, they have also begun keeping camels, which they have acquired through government and non-governmental organizations. Their livestock management depends on herd size and the proximity of grazing areas to the homestead. In families with many animals, older boys and men take care of the cattle in faraway camps. Smaller herds stay closer to the village, where older children look after the goats and sheep. Younger children, especially girls, usually care for the goats and sheep near home. In addition to herding, the Hamar who live in the mountainous area also engage in cultivation. So, their economy combines the rearing of animals (goats, sheep, cattle), farming (sorghum, maize, varieties of beans), beekeeping, and hunting and gathering.

== Origin myths and history ==
There are shortage of written sources on the origin and history of the Hamar prior to the conquest by Emperor Menelik II towards the end of 19th century. The only important paper about their origin myth based on their oral history was written by Ivo Strecker and characterized that the Hamar identity and history was shaped by migration and the complex intergroup relationship with the other group that they encountered during their migration. Based on this work and literature on the neighboring communities, I provide the overview of the Origin myth and History of the Hamar before their incorporation into Ethiopian state.

The Hamar people trace their origins to migration into the Lower Omo Valley, where interactions with neighboring groups played a crucial role in shaping their cultural identity and history. The Hamar acknowledge the presence of the mythical Boa people, believed to be cattle herders who inhabited the area before them. Upon their arrival, they also encountered the Borana, who were herding cattle in the Weito Valley but did not practice cultivation. Oral tradition recounts that a Hamar ritual leader used magical powers to drive the Borana eastward, clearing the way for Hamar settlement. Additionally, the Hamar came into contact with the Arbore, an already well-established group in the region known for their strong ritual leadership and agro-pastoral economy.

During their migration to their current location, the Hamar also encountered the Dasanech, who inhabit both the western and eastern sides of the Omo River. Oral histories suggest that relations between the two groups were sometimes peaceful, particularly during periods when the Hamar sought refuge among the Dasanech—first during a severe drought and later after their defeat by Menelik's troops. Another group the Hamar encountered during their migration was the Murle, who lived south of Lake Diba. Due to their declining population, the Murle became increasingly vulnerable to Hamar expansion, ultimately forcing them to abandon their homeland.

Another significant group the Hamar encountered during their migration into the Lower Omo Valley was the Kara, who currently live on the eastern side of the Omo River. Today, the Kara are one of the ethnic groups living within the Hamar district and sharing not only administrative district but also language and many other cultural elements.

Additionally, the Kwegu were another group the Hamar encountered during their early migration to their present area. The Kwegu had long inhabited the Omo River region but were later displaced to the western side of the Omo River in the neighboring Nyangatom district.

Unlike the Kara, Dassanech, Arbore, Tsamai, and Banna—who, like the Hamar, practice an agro-pastoral way of life—the Kwegu maintain a distinct hunting and gathering lifestyle, occupying separate ecological and social domains. These complex intergroup relationships have played a crucial role in shaping the Hamar's identity and historical development.

In terms of contact with the outsiders, European explorers were the first foreigners to arrive in Hamar territory, but their presence had little impact. Real disruption came with the expansion of Emperor Menelik II's troops, who sought to incorporate the region into the Ethiopian state. The Hamar were incorporated into the Ethiopian state by Emperor Menelik II at the end of the 19th century. Initially, their attempts to advance through the Weito Valley were unsuccessful due to the Hamar's resistance and the region's challenging terrain. However, a second offensive from the north, through the Weito Valley and into the Wururi Plains, allowed them to penetrate Hamar territory more effectively. After subduing the Hamar, Ethiopian forces continued southward to establish political control over other groups, such as the Kara, Murle, and Dasanech.

The Ethiopian conquest had devastating consequences for the Hamar. Their prolonged resistance led to widespread killings and enslavement by Menelik's troops, forcing many to escape to malaria-prone lowland areas beyond direct imperial control. Later, during Emperor Haile Selassie’s rule (1930–1974), the Ethiopian government maintained dominance over the Hamar through taxation and conflict mediation but did not actively suppress their cultural traditions. Under the socialist Derg regime (1974–1991), development projects such as schools, roads, and markets were introduced, though they reflected a civilizational bias.

Following the fall of the Derg in 1991, Ethiopia’s ethnic-based federalism granted the Hamar self-governance and access to modern infrastructure. However, modernization efforts often clashed with traditional Hamar practices, leading to tensions with the district administration. Over time, disputes escalated into armed conflict, culminating in violent clashes between the Hamar and local police in 2015. Although regional and national authorities have since intervened, tensions remain unresolved, highlighting the ongoing struggles between traditional societies and state-driven development policies.

== Cultural events and practices ==
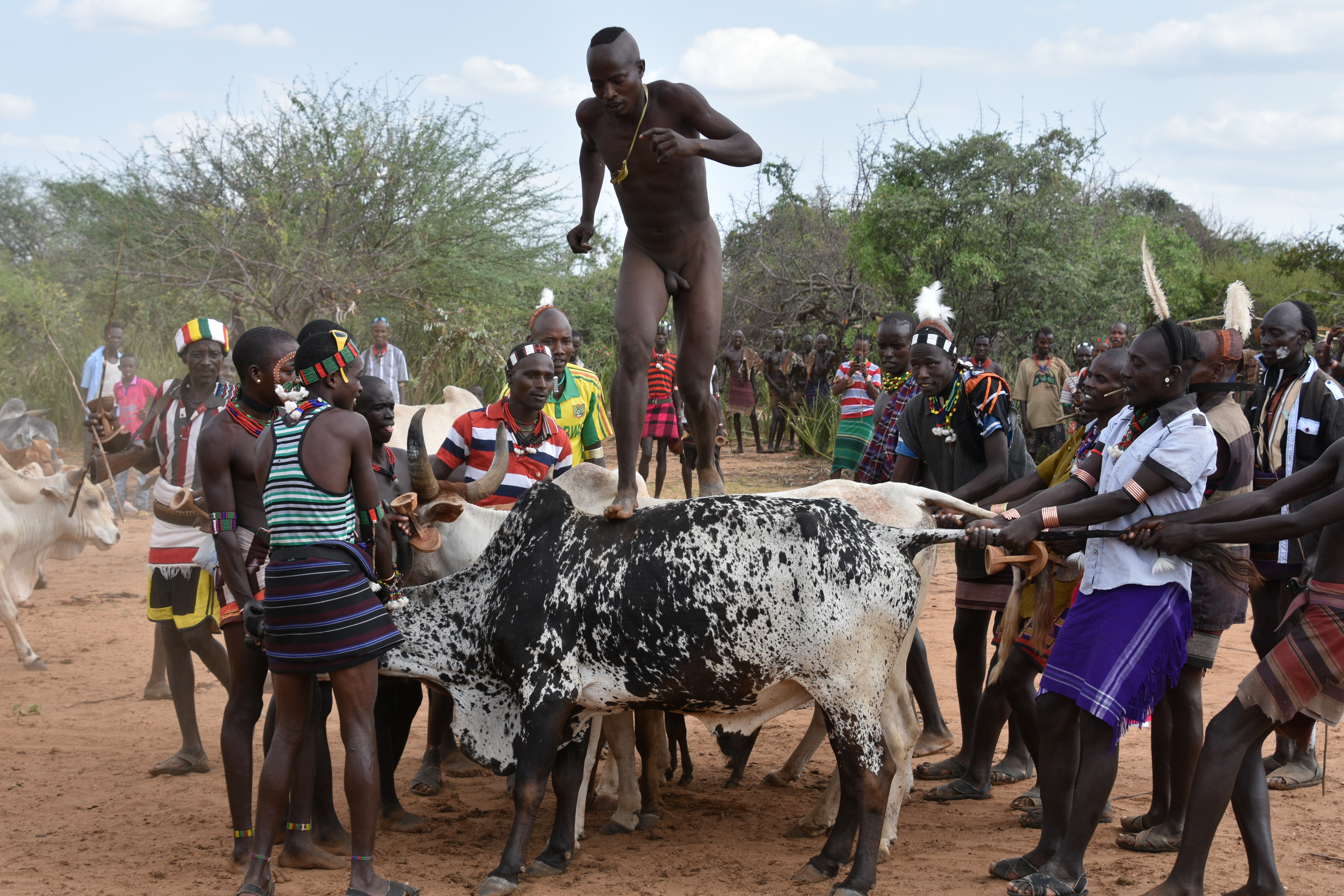
Bull-jumping ceremony

=== Bull-jumping ceremony ===
One of the cultural events ingrained in Hamar identity that reflects masculinity and social cohesion is the bull-jumping ceremony. It is the most significant ceremony among the Hamar and marks a man’s rite of passage from boyhood to manhood, after which he can own cattle and marry.

=== Evangadi ceremony ===
Evangadi translated as night dance is also a well-known cultural event among the Hamar. As its name indicate it is a night time dance and play by adolescent and unmarried males and females and a ground for choosing their future marriage partner.

=== Mingi ===
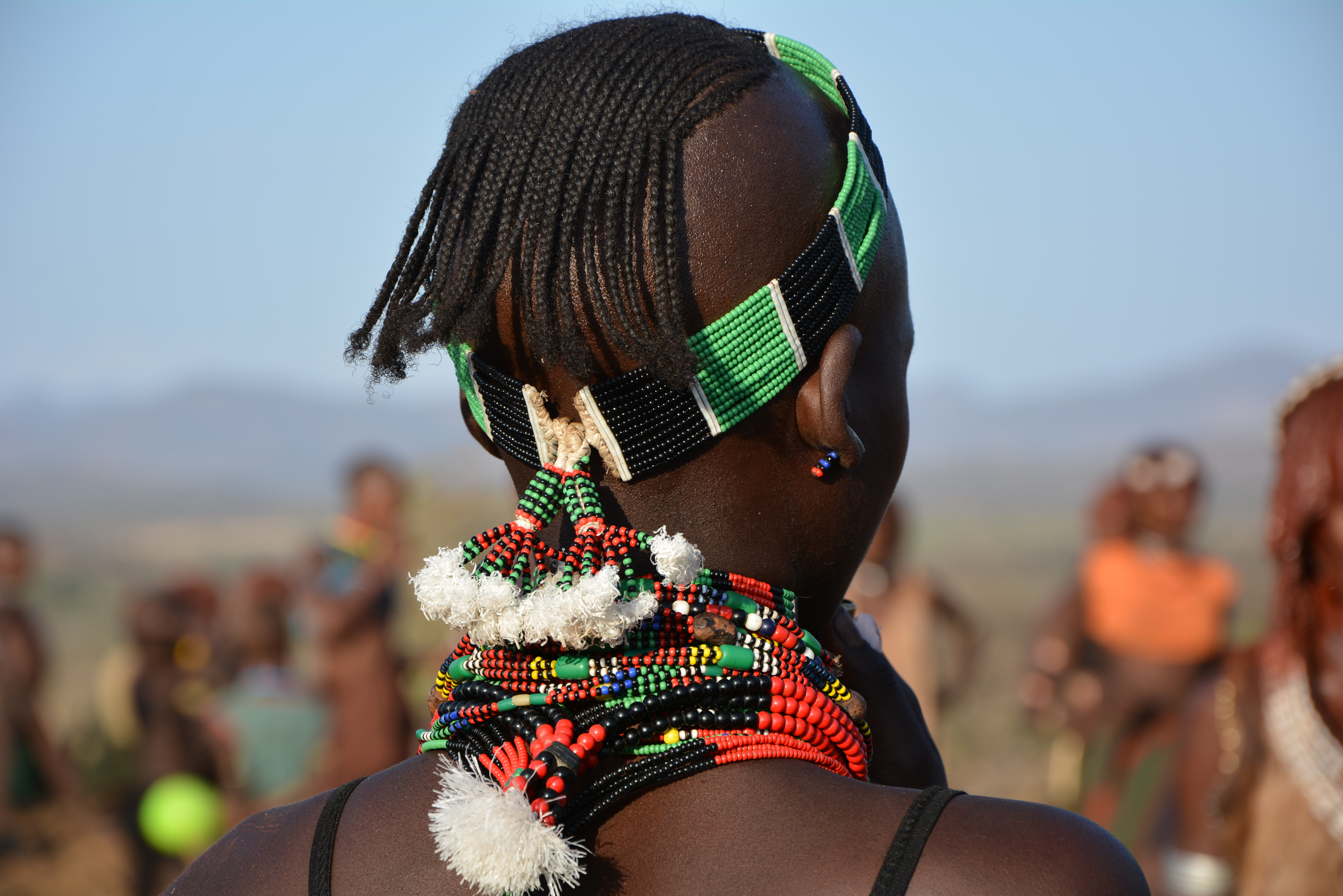
Hamer decoration

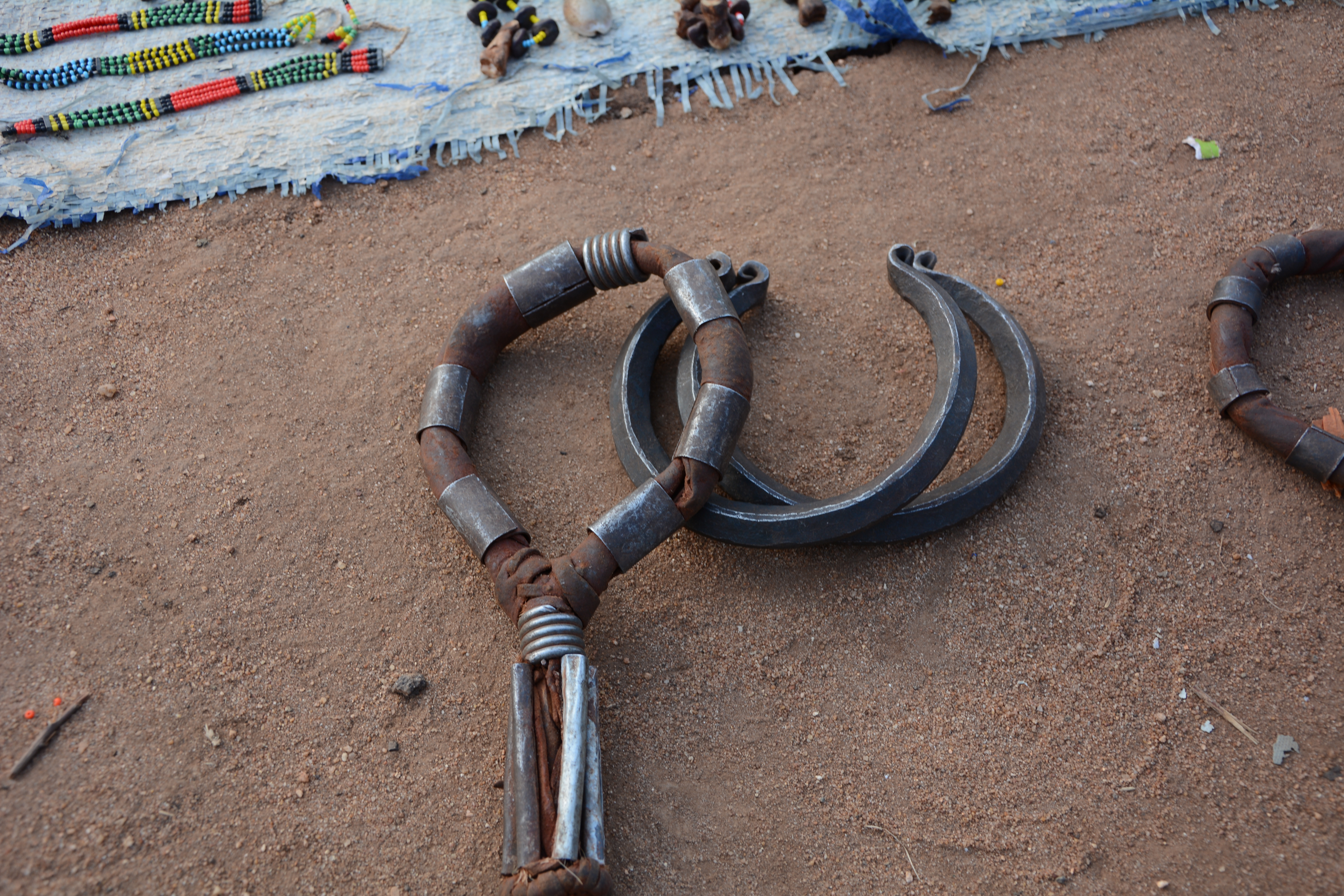
Collars for Hamer married women

Mingi, in the religion of the Hamar and related groups, is the state of being impure or "ritually polluted". A person, often a child, who was considered mingi is killed by forced permanent separation from the tribe by being left alone in the jungle or by drowning in the river.

== Medical Knowledge and Practice ==
In Ethiopia, the use of medicinal plants has a long history. Research into indigenous plant knowledge among various ethnic groups often emphasizes the specific characteristics of these plants, particularly their perceived effectiveness in alleviating symptoms or addressing the root causes of illness.

Among the Hamar community, traditional medical practices, especially the use of herbal remedies, play a significant role in treating a wide range of human and livestock ailments. They use a variety of plant species, with leaves and roots being the most commonly utilized parts. One study documented 145 medicinal plant species in the Buska Mountain range. This high number likely reflects the community's reliance on traditional remedies, a situation partly influenced by limited access to modern healthcare services.

However, the continued use of traditional medicine among the Hamar is under threat. Knowledge is primarily passed down orally from one generation to the next, and the younger generation is showing a declining interest in learning and preserving this traditional knowledge.

== Social organizations ==
The Hamar social and political structure is characterized by an egalitarian system without a central leader or chief. The Hamar are described as "polycephalous" society meaning authority is distributed rather than centralized. Their society functions under a system of regulated anarchy, where seniority and rhetorical skills play a crucial role in daily affairs and conflict resolution.

The Hamar have two ritual leaders, known as bitta, one from the Gatta clan and the other from the Worla clan. These leaders oversee spiritual matters but do not wield political authority. Additionally, Hamar society is organized into twenty-four exogamous clans, which are grouped into two moieties.

== Gender relations ==
The Hamar are a patriarchical society. Men holding onto customary leadership positions administer political and cultural aspect of life of the Hamar. Women who make up a considerable proportion of the Hamar population have little political participation despite bearing social responsibilities in a conservative polygamous, patriarchal and patrilocal society.

In terms of labour division, Hamar men are largely assoiated with cattle herding as they herd cattle by moving them in search of pasture and possibly enter into conflicts with other pastoralist groups. On the other, women engage actively in farming activities as they assume the lion's share of activities associated with the production of sorghum and maize, as well as other crops.

Despite the responsibilities Hamar women have at home and in their farm fields and the knowledge and experience they possess, the customary system tends not to recognize their status. Women in Hamar are cultivators, herders and keepers of their families. They might wake up before dawn to fetch water and make tea (usually made of coffee sheath, locally called shoforo), and prepare food for the family. Once the men leave with the herds, women clean up the kraal and the homestead. They may then go to the wild to collect firewood and small leaves and branches for small and weak livestock. On market days, women might go out to sell products and buy goods, and on other days choose to spend the day in the farm with their children and herds.

Girls of school age were absorbed with daily activities mainly in keeping birds away from farms, cooking meals in the farms and cultivating the farm, collecting firewood, fetching water, cleaning and taking care of siblings and small ruminants whereas boys on the other hand were given assignments such as taking care of the cattle, goat and sheep herd around the village and in camp herds that are located away from the village. In the alternative basic education center that provides education service at three levels, school dropouts were common particularly among boys as they were often sent to herd camps very far from the village whereas girls are more fortunate in attending classes even after getting married as long as the educational centers exist in the husbands’ villages.

== Development intervention, human rights and local cultural values ==
=== Education ===
There is a significant disparity in school attendance between boys and girls in the Hamar community. While some progress has been made in enrolling girls in school, substantial challenges remain. For instance, Alternative Basic Education Centers have struggled to transition girls into primary schools in villages and towns. Several factors contribute to this issue, with the most significant being a lack of parental awareness about the importance of education, particularly for girls. In many cases, girls are expected to prioritize domestic and agricultural responsibilities over schooling, which significantly limits their access to formal education.

Even when parents send their daughters to boarding schools, reports of rape, unintended pregnancies, and relationships outside of arranged marriages have severely undermined trust in the education system. Additionally, concerns over safety further discourage girls’ education. Many parents fear that their daughters may be kidnapped for forced marriage when living in towns unprotected. Girls are also perceived as bearers of Hamar cultural traditions, and formal education is often seen as a threat to their ability to fulfill traditional roles. If they attend school, they are believed to be less likely to become competent Hamar women.

Beyond cultural barriers, financial constraints also hinder access to higher education. To attend preparatory-level education (Grades 11–12), students must relocate to Jinka, the capital of the South Omo Zone, where they are responsible for covering accommodation and food expenses, making it an impractical option for many families.

=== Human rights vs local values: the case of harmful traditional practice ===
The concept of purity holds great significance for the Hamar and their neighboring groups. A person considered spiritually "unclean" or "impure" is referred to as mingi. Various factors can cause impurity, including a spiritual leader carrying a gun or killing a person, engaging in sexual relations with a kinsman, the premature eruption of upper teeth, and unnatural birth. Mingi children—those born without the proper performance of preconception rites or whose teeth grow first on the upper jaw—are believed to bring harm to their family.

However, mingi has been identified as one of the harmful traditional practices (HTPs) by local government authorities, and significant efforts have been made to educate local communities. Various government offices, including Women and Children's Affairs Office, Culture and Tourism Office, Education Office, Justice Office, and Health Office, conduct regular visits to Hamar villages to raise awareness about the dangers and illegality of HTPs, including infanticide. International organizations such as Save the Children, UNICEF, and AMREF collaborate with local individuals and agencies to promote awareness and provide educational support to the community. Additionally, Omo Child, a local NGO, plays a key role in advocacy by educating the public and offering shelter to affected children in its orphanage in Jinka.

Another significant cultural practice is the bull-jumping ceremony. A controversial aspect of this ceremony is the whipping of women—an act encouraged by the community but considered a harmful traditional practice by human rights advocates. In the local understanding, the scars left from the whipping are worn with pride, as they symbolize a woman's devotion to men. Women often compete over who will be whipped first, sometimes even stealing each other's whips. The unmarried men who have successfully completed the bull-jumping ceremony, known as maza, are responsible for whipping the women. In return, a maza enters into an agreement with the women he has whipped, promising to support them if the need arises.

However, developmentalists and human rights advocates argue that this practice is harmful, as it inflicts physical injury, excessive bleeding, and increases the risk of wound infections for women. As a result, the practice is contested as an HTP by human rights organizations and local advocacy groups such as Omo Child. Despite these efforts, the practice still persists.

In a 2025 interview with pontifical charity Aid to the Church in Need, the provincial superior of the Spiritans in Ethiopia, Fr Kilimpe Garbicha, commented on the bull jumping ceremony, and how the Catholic Church navigates the issue in its efforts to evangelise. "As a missionary, I feel called to do something. It is part of evangelisation; it is part of this dialoguing with the culture. It is about small conversations, without judging them. They can still keep their customs, but can we do it an alternative way that is softer and doesn’t harm people’s bodies? It is a slow process that involves a lot of dialogue.” He further said: “I don’t want people to see their culture as bad. We don’t undermine it. We dialogue with and evangelise the culture. We as Catholics don’t create divisions. We create unity and respect culture and engage with it. We learn their language and live their way of life. We find important things in the culture that can help people to learn the Gospel"

== The Hamar and their neighbors ==
The Hamar forms a cultural unit with their closest neighbors (namely, the Bashada, Bana and Kara), with whom they share a common language and most rituals and institutions, freely intermarry, and warfare is prohibited. First, these groups speak the same South Omotic language. Second, they engage in intermarriage, further strengthening their social connections. Third, they follow an agro-pastoral way of life, combining livestock herding with farming. Fourth, they all recognize a ritual leader known as bita, who is responsible for ensuring the well-being of the people, livestock, and land through ritual practices. Fifth, like other East African pastoralist societies, these groups have an age-set system in which all males undergo initiation at a certain age. Lastly, they share important cultural practices such as infanticide (mingi) and the bull-jumping ceremony, which includes the associated whipping of girls.

Besides this, the Hamar have a conflictual relationship with some of their neighboring groups. For instance, they frequently engage in conflicts with the Nyangatom over grazing land and cattle raiding.

== See also ==
- Hamer language

== Films ==
- 1973 – Rivers of Sand by Robert Gardner color, 83 min
- 1994 – Sweet Sorghum: An Ethnographer's Daughter Remembers Life in Hamar, Southern Ethiopia: a film by Ivo Strecker and Jean Lydall and their daughter Kaira Strecker. A production of IWF. Watertown, Massachusetts: Documentary Educational Resources, [released c. 1997]. VHS. Presenter/narrator, Kaira Strecker; producer, Rolf Husmann.
- 1996 release – "The Hamar Trilogy." A series of three films by Joanna Head and Jean Lydell; distributed by Filmakers Library, NYC. Titles in the series are: The Women Who Smile, Two Girls Go Hunting and Our Way of Loving.
- 2001 – Duka's Dilemma: A Visit to Hamar, Southern Ethiopia. A film by Jean Lydall and Kaira Strecker. Watertown, Massachusetts: Documentary Educational Resources, released in 2004. DVD. Camera, sound, and editing, Kaira Strecker; anthropology and production, Jean Lydall.
- 2001 – The Last Warriors: The Hamar and Karo Tribes: Searching for Mingi. A Trans Media production; Southern Star. Princeton, New Jersey: Films for the Humanities & Sciences. VHS. From The Last Warriors: Seven Tribes on the Verge of Extinction. Series producer/executive producer, Michael Willesee Jr.; writer/director, Ben Ulm. ISBN 0-7365-3606-X.

== Discography ==
- 2003 – Nyabole: Hamar – Southern Ethiopia. CD. Museum collection Berlin series. Recorded between 1770 and 1776 and originally published on LP 1768. Mainz, Germany: Wergo.
