= USNO (disambiguation) =

USNO or Usno, may refer to:

- United States Naval Observatory
- United Sabah National Organisation, a defunct political party in Malaysia
- United Sabah National Organisation (New), a revived political party in Malaysia
- Usno River, a river in Ethiopia
