= Bena Tsemay =

Woreda in SERS, Ethiopia

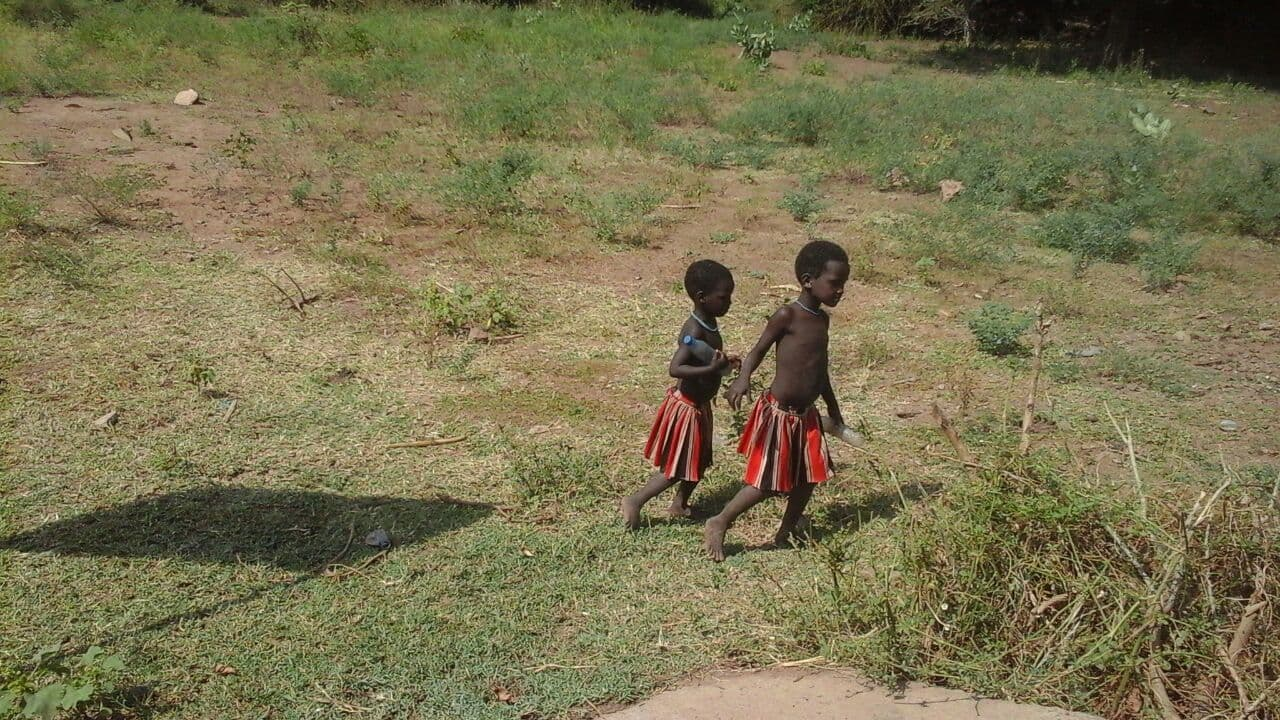
Children looking for drinking water

Bena Tsemay is one of the woredas in the South Ethiopia Regional State. It is named after Banna and Tsamai people who are living at this woreda. Part of the Debub Omo Zone, Bena Tsemay is bordered on the south by Hamer, on the west by Selamago, on the north by Bako Gazer and Male, on the northeast by the Dirashe special woreda, on the east by the Konso special woreda, and on the southeast by the Oromia Region; the Weito River separates it from Konso special woreda and Oromia Region. Western part of this woreda is included in the Mago National Park. The administrative center is Key Afer. Bena Tsemay was part of former Hamer Bena woreda.

1. "Maro Maro Maro# Bane Nations Era Change Festival".

Maro, the founding event of the Maro Bane Nation's Era Change Festival, is rooted in the core values of solidarity, peace, tolerance, and similar principles. The festival takes place in the southern parts of the newly organized region of southern Ethiopia, specifically in the Benatsemay woreda of the Debub Omo zone. The Bane nation, with its own traditional administrative structure, follows a leadership hierarchy consisting of Bit/King, Koogoo/Next King, and Goodel/Next King Leading. The Maro ceremony is enforced by the traditional structure called Goodel, which is led by kings representing traditional administrative authority in one or more villages within a kebele. The Goodel administration plays a significant role in preserving and promoting the values associated with Maro. The Maro festival is initiated by summoning the elders of the country, who gather before the New Year's harvest season. In the presence of the elders, a symbolic act called "Koogoo" is performed, which involves taking out wood from a fire. This act signifies the beginning of the festival. The procedure starts by calling two elders from the village before the harvest season. The Koogoo then creates a fire through friction, known as "Loopan Nunoo." After igniting the fire, the Koogoo extinguishes it and gives three or more short appointments to the elders to tie a rope. Following this, the Goodel takes the Koogoo or the Friction/Sebeka, removes the fire, blesses it, and distributes it to all the people. The participants take the new fire to their homes, replacing the old fire with the new one. Once this ceremony is completed, marking the arrival of the sowing season, the Goodel field is covered with seeds, and the people begin sowing their own seeds. After the harvest, the people bring two bunches of red sorghum and two bunches of red sorghum stalks to Goodel's house. Goodel then takes out fire from the Koogoo wood, roasts and eats the corn and sorghum stalks brought by the people. This act is known as "Goodelsa Tshan Nunoo" or Goodel's fire of fire. Following this, the people dry the leftover straw they brought and prepare Borde or "Farsi." The produce from the Goodel field is gathered in advance, similar to preparing for farming. An appointment is made to gather at Goodel's house for the "Maro Gaadi" or Maro Dance/Dankira. All the people of Bane prepare the traditional drink Borde/Farsi and go to Goodel's house. They celebrate by drinking, eating, performing traditional dances, and expressing their happiness. Additionally, the blooming of the Gaalli plant in the land of Bane signifies the arrival of the Maro festival. Gaalli is a plant used in various cultural activities by the Bane people, such as ceremonies related to childbirth and marriage. The blooming of Gaalli indicates hope and prosperity for the Bane people, and it serves as a way to recognize the beginning of Maro festival. The Bane people have their own calendar, and the Maro festival takes place from December to January. The Bane calendar marks the beginning of the New Age in December, with the rising and setting of the moon serving as a reference point. The Bane month and date calendar is 15 days ahead of the Ethiopian calendar. Therefore, December 15th is chosen as the day to celebrate the Bane Maro's 'Bane Nation's Era Change (New Year) Festival.' I hope this information helps everyone to understand and add the missed core values, procedure, and activities associated with the Maro Bane Nation's Era Change (New Year) Festival.written by Daniel Soytar Shashego

== Demographics ==
Based on the 2007 Census conducted by the CSA, this woreda has a total population of 52,968, of whom 26,778 are men and 26,190 women; 2,154 or 4.07% of its population are urban dwellers. The majority of the inhabitants practiced traditional beliefs, with 74.5% of the population reporting that belief, 10.87% were Protestants, and 7.74% practiced Ethiopian Orthodox Christianity.
