= Turmi =

Place in Ethiopia

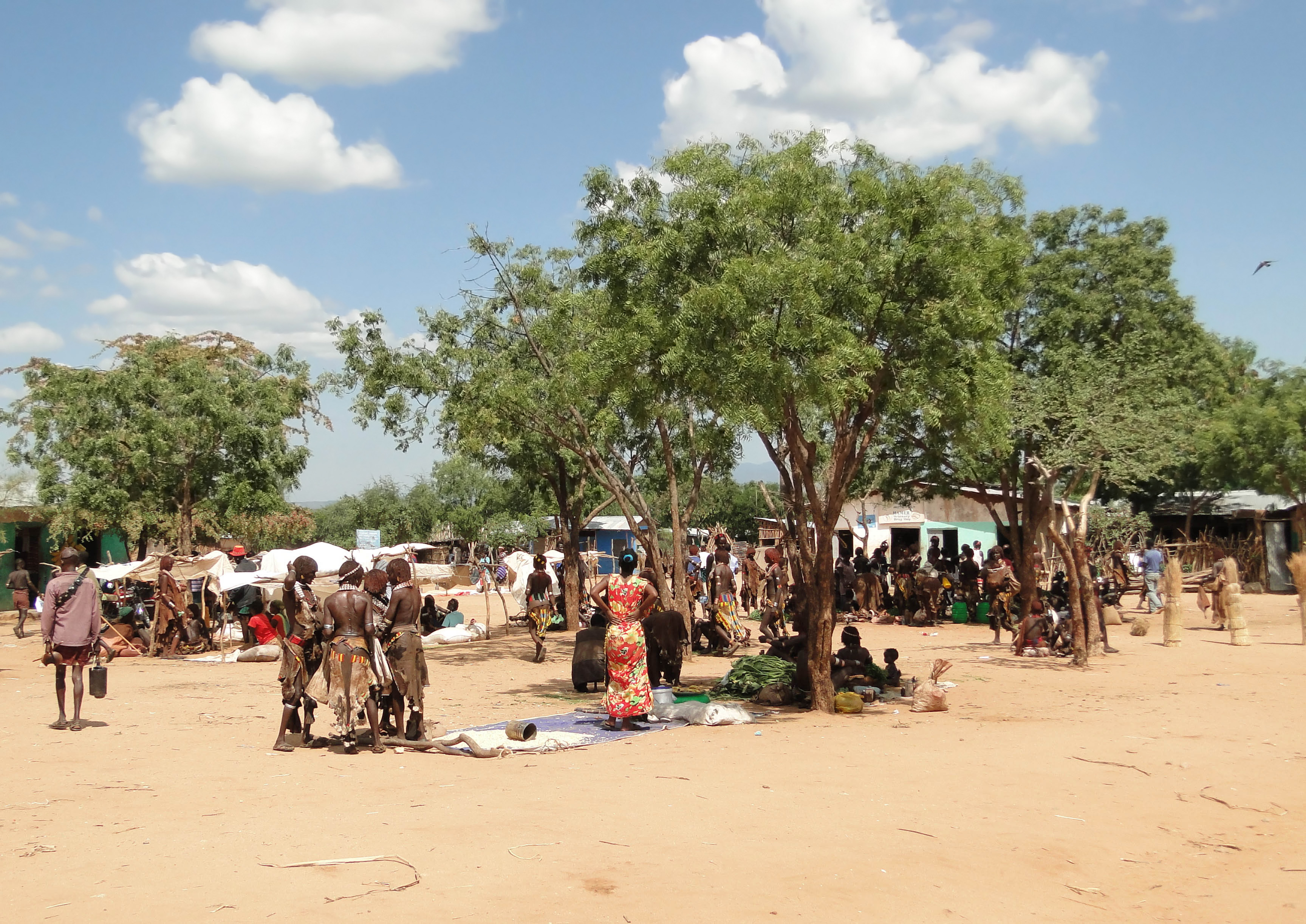
- Turmi market

- Location within Ethiopia
- Coordinates: 4°58′N 36°29′E
- Country: Ethiopia
- Region: South Ethiopia Regional State
- Zone: Debub (South) Omo
- Elevation: 925 m (3,035 ft)

Population (2005)
  - Total: 1,087
- Time zone: UTC+3 (EAT)

Turmi is a market town in south-western Ethiopia. Located in the Debub Omo Zone of the South Ethiopia Regional State, the town has a latitude and longitude of 4°58′N 36°29′E with an elevation of 925 metres above sea level.

Home to many of the Hamer people, Turmi has a weekly market on Mondays. One product available at this market is incised gourds, used by local women as shopping baskets. Turmi is also notable for its traditional dances and the Jumping of the Bulls.

In January, 2005, Turmi was the location for global conference of pastoralists. This was the largest meeting of its type, attended by about 200 pastoralists, government representatives and UN and donor organisations from 23 countries on four continents. Conferees discussed common problems and possible strategies for continuing their way of life in an evolving world.

== Demographics ==
Based on figures from the Central Statistical Agency in 2005, Turmi has an estimated total population of 1,087 of whom 576 are men and 511 are women. It is the largest settlement in Hamer woreda.

The 1994 census reported Turmi had a total population of 600 of whom 319 were men and 281 were women. The five largest ethnic groups reported for this town were the Amhara (33.33%), the Hamer (12.5%), the Goffa (12.17%), the Gamo (9.83%), and the Oromo (9.5%); all other ethnic groups made up 22.67% of the population. Amharic is spoken as a first language by 52.67%, 11% Hamer, 7.17% Oromiffa, and 6.67% spoke Konso; the remaining 22.49% spoke all other primary languages reported.
