= South Omo Zone =

Zone in South Ethiopia Regional State

Coordinates: 5°30′N 36°30′E

- Zone
- Interactive map of South Omo Zone
- Country: Ethiopia
- Region: South Ethiopia Regional State
- Capital: Dimeka

Government
  - Chief administrator: Maikel Malko (Prosperity Party)
- Time zone: UTC+3 (EAT)

Map of the regions and zones of Ethiopia

South Omo Zone is a zone in the Ethiopian South Ethiopia Regional State. South Omo is bordered to the south by Kenya, to the west by West Omo Zone, to the northwest by Keffa Zone, to the north by Ari Zone and Gofa Zone, to the northeast by Gardula, Ale Zone and Konso and to the east by the Oromia Region. The administrative center of South Omo is Dimeka.

== Overview ==
This zone is named for the Omo River, a river that flows south into Lake Turkana on the western side. Mago National Park and Tama Wildlife Reserve are located at the eastern bank of the Omo. There is Lake Chew Bahir surrounded by Stephanie Wildlife Sanctuary located at the eastern border of this zone. Notable high points include Mount Smith (2560 meters) and Mount Mago (2538 meters). West of the Omo is the most sparsely populated part of Ethiopia, inhabited by nomadic and semi-nomadic ethnic groups. A 1996 report described the infrastructure of the Zone as "weak and for the most part non-existent; this is a disadvantage inherited from historical neglect of a typical marginal region." It also observed that the South Omo Zone was "one of Ethiopian's socially most diverse zones. It contains a minimum of 12 different ethnic groups, and possibly as many as 21. Social diversity therefore compounds the existing problems of isolation, acute shortage of basic infrastructure as well as scarcity of professional and technical man-power."

South Omo has 8906 kilometers of all-weather roads and 412 kilometers of dry-weather roads, for an average road density of 37 kilometers per 1000 square kilometers. According to the Central Statistical Agency (CSA) 1,364 tons of coffee were produced in South Omo in the year ending in 2005, representing 1.36% of the Southern Nations, Nationalities and Peoples' Region (SNNPR)'s output and 0.6% of Ethiopia's total output.

== Demographics ==
Based on the 2007 Census conducted by the CSA, this Zone has a total population of 573,435, of whom 286,607 are men and 286,828 women; with an area of 21,055.92 square kilometers, South Omo has a population density of 27.23. While 43,203 or 7.53% are urban inhabitants, a further 25,518 or 4.45% are pastoralists. A total of 125,388 households were counted in this Zone, which results in an average of 4.57 persons to a household, and 121,309 housing units. The eight largest ethnic groups reported in this Zone were the Aari (44.59%), which is currently included in the Ari Zone, the Male (13.63%), the Daasanach (8.17%), the Hamer (8.01%), the Banna (4.42%), the Amhara (4.21%), the Tsamai (3.39%), and the Nyangatom (2.95%); all other ethnic groups made up 10.63% of the population. Aari is spoken as a first language by 44.34% at time, 14.25% speak Male, 8.17% Hamer, 8.16% Daasanach, 5.07% Amharic, 4.49% Banna, 3.03% Tsamai, and 2.94% speak Nyangatom; the remaining 9.55% spoke all other primary languages reported. 50.86% practiced traditional beliefs, 30.44% were Protestants, 12.23% of the population said they practiced Ethiopian Orthodox Christianity, and 1.33% were Muslim.

In the 1994 Census, South Omo had a population of 327,867 in 77,694 households, of whom 165,064 were men and 162,803 women; 22,084 or 6.74% of its population were urban dwellers. The six largest ethnic groups reported in this Zone were the Aari (42.94%), the Maale (13.49%), the Hamer (12.89%), the Daasanach (9.77%), the Amhara (5.59%), and the Nyangatom (4.33%); all other ethnic groups made up 10.99% of the population. Aari is spoken as a first language by 43.33%, 13.7% speak Male, 13% Hamer, 9.76% Daasanach, 6.19% Amharic, and 4.32% speak Nyangatom; the remaining 9.7% spoke all other primary languages reported.

According to a May 24, 2004 World Bank memorandum, 4% of the inhabitants of South Omo have access to electricity, this zone has a road density of 22.7 kilometers per 1000 square kilometers (compared to the national average of 30 kilometers), the average rural household has 0.4 hectare of land (compared to the national average of 1.01 hectare of land and an average of 0.89 for the former SNNPR) the equivalent of 1.5 heads of livestock. 11.5% of the population is in non-farm related jobs, compared to the national average of 25% and a Regional average of 32%. 37% of all eligible children are enrolled in primary school, and 7% in secondary schools. 77% of the zone is exposed to malaria, and 61% to Tsetse fly. The memorandum gave this zone a drought risk rating of 348.

This Zone was selected by the Ministry of Agriculture and Rural Development in 2004 as one of several areas for voluntary resettlement for farmers from overpopulated areas; no specific of the Zones woredas were identified in this program. South Omo became the new home for a total of 4748 heads of households and 18,992 total family members.

== Woredas ==
Current Districts (also called woreda locally, is third level administration in Ethiopia after Zone) of South Omo Zone are:

Districts and administrative towns
Number	Woredas	Administrative town
1	Bena Tsemay	Key Afer
2	Dasenech	Omorate
3	Hamer	Dimeka*
4	Male	Lemo Gento
5	Nyangatom	Kangaton
6	Selamago	Hanna

* Town administrations, which are considered as Woreda for all administrative purposes. Turmi which is in the Hamer woreda is also one of town administration in this Zone.

=== Former ===
- Hamer Bena
