= Kuraz =

Coordinates: 4°55′N 36°05′E

Kuraz is one of the woredas in the South Ethiopia Regional State. It is the homeland of Daasanach people. Part of the Debub Omo Zone, Kuraz is bordered on the south by Kenya, on the west by the Ilemi Triangle (claimed by Ethiopia, Kenya and South Sudan), on the north by Nyangatom, and on the east by Hamer. The Omo River is flowing through Kuraz to Lake Turkana at the border of Kenya. The administrative center of this woreda is Omorate. Nyangatom woreda was separated from Kuraz.

== Overview ==
This woreda is located in part of the semi-arid lowlands which support agro-pastoral groups who are at various stages of transition from nomadic to sedentary livelihoods. High points in this woreda include Mount Kuraz (912 meters), which is part of the Korath Range. According to a 2004 report, Kuraz had 55 kilometers of all-weather roads and 48 kilometers of dry-weather roads, for an average road density of 20 kilometers per 1000 square kilometers.

Kuraz was greatly affected by the August 2006 Omo River floods, which drowned at least 364 people and isolated tens of thousands more. A team led by Regional President Shiferaw Shigute visited the affected sites on 16 August to assess the impact of the flooding and identify the immediate humanitarian needs.

Located in this woreda is the Fejej archeological site, which a team led by Henry de Lumley, Professor Emeritus at the National Museum of Natural History, and Yonas Beyene, Head of the Archaeological and Anthropological Department of the Authority for Research and Conservation of Cultural Heritage of the Ethiopian Ministry of Culture, Youth and Sport found rich with remains of animals and artifacts perfectly intact and particularly well conserved, which were dated as being 1.96 million years old. These excavations were conducted between 1992 and 2002, and the findings published in 2004.

== Demographics ==
Based on the 2007 Census conducted by the CSA, this woreda has a total population of 52,708, of whom 26,935 are men and 25,773 women; 2,361 or 4.48% of its population are urban dwellers. The majority of the inhabitants practiced traditional beliefs, with 81.93% of the population reporting that belief, 6.8% practiced Ethiopian Orthodox Christianity, 5.7% were Protestants, and 3.12% were Muslim.

In the 1994 national census Kuraz had a population of 48,165, of whom 24,489 were men and 23,676 women; 1,857 or 3.86% of its population were urban dwellers. The three largest ethnic groups reported in this woreda were the Daasanach (66.44%), the Nyangatom (29.38%), and the Amhara (1.31%); all other ethnic groups made up 2.87% of the population. Daasanach was spoken as a first language by 66.42% of the inhabitants, 29.36% spoke Nyangatom, and 2.46% spoke Amharic; the remaining 1.87% spoke all other primary languages reported. Concerning education, 3.77% of the population were considered literate. Concerning sanitary conditions, about 64% of the urban and 6% of the total had toilet facilities.
