= Mago National Park =

National park in South Ethiopia Regional State, Ethiopia

- IUCN category II (national park)
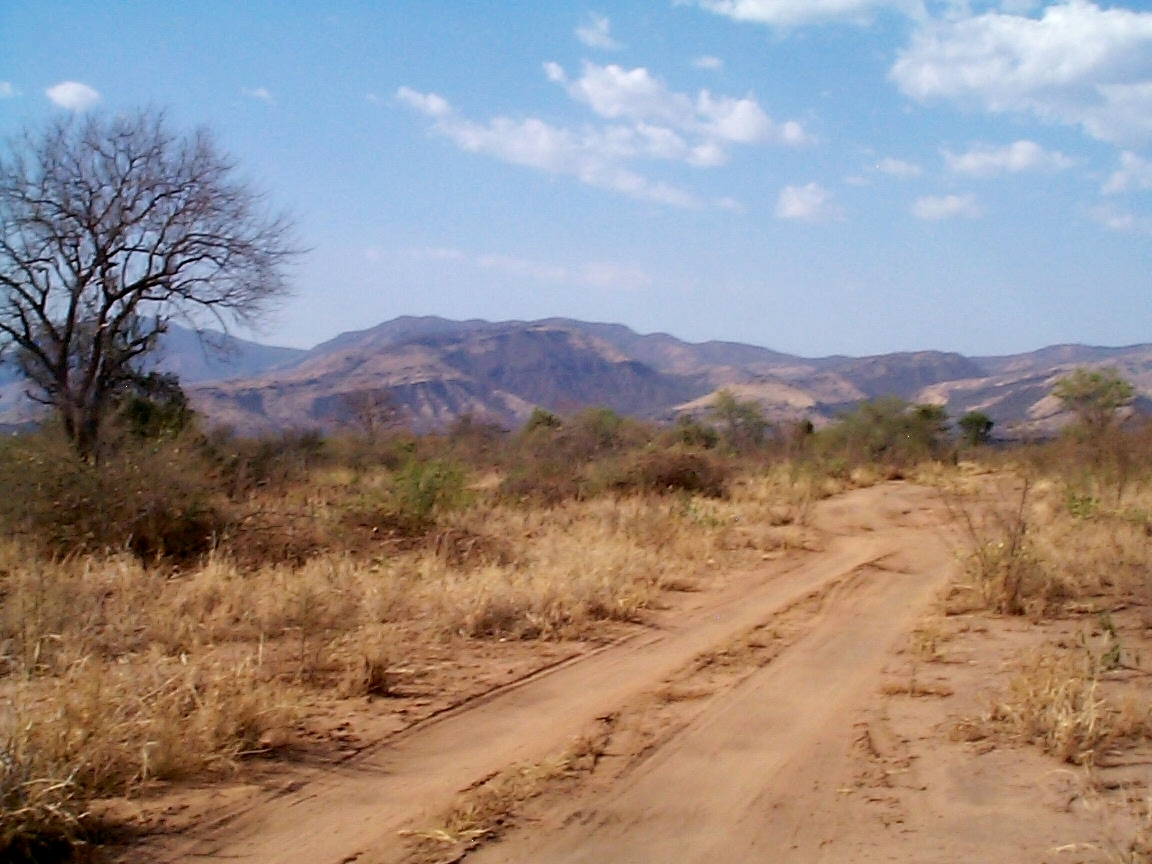
- Mago National Park, February 2006

- Location within Ethiopia
- Location: Ethiopia
- Nearest city: Jinka
- Coordinates: 5°40′N 36°10′E
- Area: 2,220 km^{2} (860 sq mi)
- Established: 1979

Mago National Park is a national park in Ethiopia located in the South Ethiopia Regional State about 782 kilometers south of Addis Ababa and north of a large 90° bend in the Omo River, the 2162 square kilometers of this park are divided by the Mago River, a tributary of the Omo, into two parts. To the west is the Tama Wildlife Reserve, with the Tama river defining the boundary between the two. To the south is the Murle Controlled Hunting Area, distinguished by Lake Dipa which stretches along the left side of the lower Omo. The park office is 115 kilometers north of Omorate and 26 kilometers southwest of Jinka. All roads to and from the park are unpaved.

== Ecology ==
=== Geography ===
The Mago National Park was established in 1979, making it the newest of Ethiopia's several National Parks. Its highest point is Mount Mago (2528meters). The major environments in and around the Park are the rivers and riverine forest, the wetlands along the lower Mago and around Lake Dipa, the various grasslands on the more level areas, and scrub on the sides of the hills. Open grassland comprises about 9% of the park's area. The largest trees are found in the riverine forest beside the Omo, Mago and Neri.

In this park, the main biomes or landforms are Savanna, Acacia trees, Shrubland, and also Woodland.

=== Fauna ===
Mago National Park affords protection to 74 species of mammals and 237 species of birds. At least 10 species of reptiles and 14 species of fish are also found within the park's ecosystem.

Indigenous bird life includes the extremely uncommon Dusky babbler (Turdoides tenebrosus) especially at Lake Dipa, Black-rumped waxbill (Estrilda troglodytes) in the rank grass along streams and swamp edges, Violet wood hoopoe (Phoeniculus damarensis), Allen's gallinule (Porphyrio alleni), Striated heron(Butorides striatus) also at Lake Dipa, and in riverine contexts Egyptian plover (Pluvianus aegypticus), Pel's fishing owl (Scotopelia peli), and snowy-crowned robin-chat (Cossypha niveicapilla).

Other animals that are interesting to find are Lion, Leopard, Lelwel Hartebeest, Beisa oryx, Hippopotamus, Cape Buffalo, Cheetah, Giraffe, Gerenuk, Hyena, African Wild Dog, Warthog, Nile Crocodile, Zebra, and African Elephant.

Different stages of woody plant encroachment were identified at the national park, mainly linked to fire suppression.

== Native people ==
The park's perhaps best-known attraction is the Mursi people, known for piercing their lips and inserting disks made of clay. Areas along the lower Omo (within the park) are populated with a rich diversity of ethnic groups, including the Aari, Banna, Bongoso, Hamar, Karo, Kwegu, Male and Mursi peoples.
