= List of districts in the South Ethiopia Regional State =

This is a list of the cities and woredas (districts), in the South Ethiopia Regional State of Ethiopia, compiled from material on the Central Statistical Agency (CSA) website.
