= Hamer (woreda) =

District in South Ethiopia Regional State

Coordinates: 5°10′N 36°40′E

Hamer is a woreda in South Ethiopia Regional State. It is named after Hamer people who live in this woreda. Part of the Debub Omo Zone, Hamer is bordered to the south by Dasenech woreda, to the southwest by Kuraz, to the west by Nyangatom, to the north by Bena Tsemay, and to the east by the Oromia Region; the Weito River separates it from the Oromia Region. Hamer includes part of Lake Chew Bahir along its southeastern border. The administrative center is Dimeka; other towns include Turmi. Hamer was part of former Hamer Bena woreda. They wore the nations namely Hamer(dominant), Kara, and Arbore nations live together with respecting each other with tolerance.

== Demographics ==
Based on the 2007 Census conducted by the CSA, this woreda has a total population of 59,572, of whom 29,905 are men and 29,667 women; 3,213 or 5.39% of its population are urban dwellers. The majority of the inhabitants practiced traditional beliefs, with 91.32% of the population reporting that belief, 3.02% practiced Ethiopian Orthodox Christianity, 2.4% were Protestants, and 2.09% were Muslim.
