= Omorate =

Town in southern Ethiopia

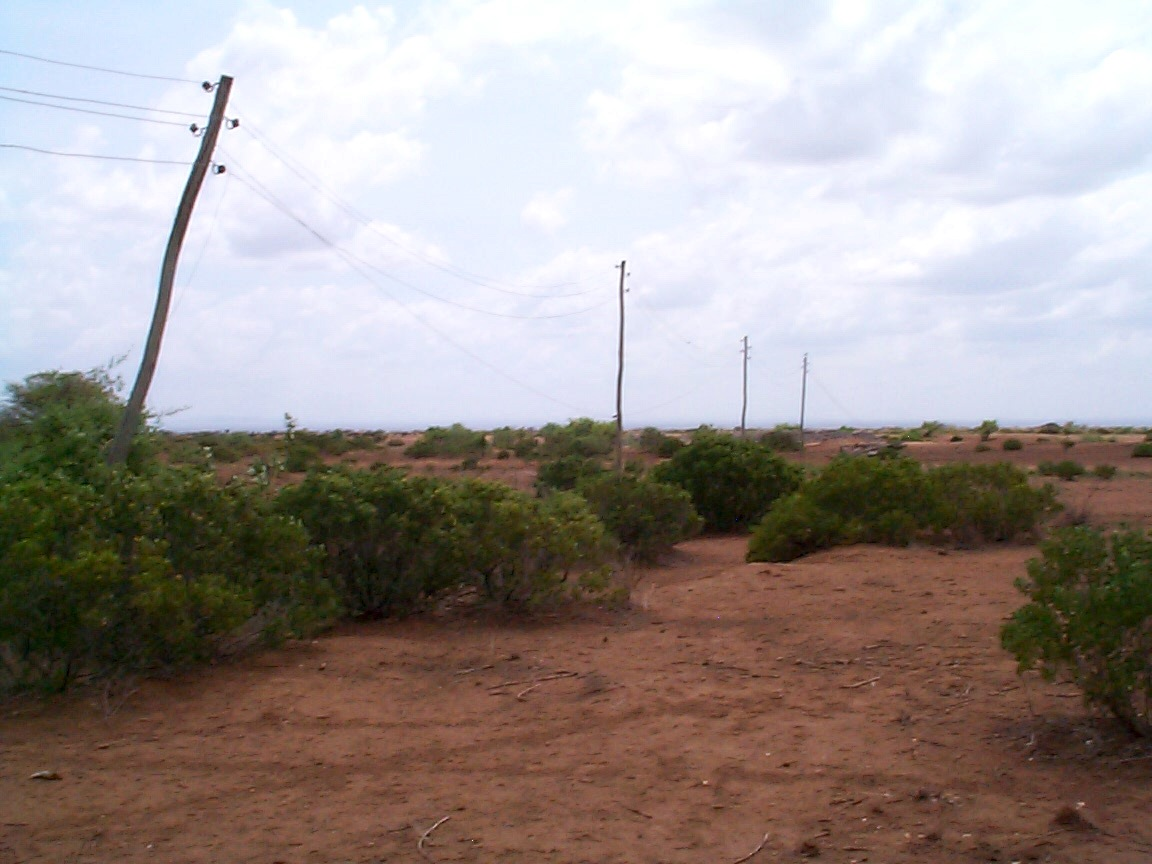
Abandoned powerlines near Omorate - part of the abandoned North Korean cotton plantation scheme

Omorate (also known as Kelem) is a town in southern Ethiopia near the Kenyan border. Located in the Debub Omo Zone of the South Ethiopia Regional State, this village has a latitude and longitude of 4°48′N 35°58′E with an elevation of 395 meters above sea level. It is the administrative center of Kuraz woreda.

== History ==
Although during the Italian occupation there was an official in residence at Kelem (as it was known then), who encouraged the local Daasanach to resist and repulse an advance of 3,000 men of the King's African Rifles in early 1941, until the 1970s Omorate was little more than one of a handful of scattered police stations in this part of Ethiopia.

In a more recent publication, although describing Omorate as an "archetypical tropical backwater", Philip Briggs notes that the village is "epitomised by the relics of the agricultural cotton scheme that was initiated with North Korean funds in the Mengistu era and faltered to a standstill more than a decade back. The retrenched victims of this aborted masterplan still haunt the bars of Omorate, willing to talk the ear off any stranger about their misfortune".

== Demographics ==
Based on figures from the Central Statistical Agency in 2005, Omorate has an estimated total population of 3363, of whom 1842 were males and 1521 were females. The 1994 national census reported this town had a total population of 1,857 of whom 1,020 were males and 837 were females.
