= Nyangatom (woreda) =

Woreda in Ethiopia

Nyangatom is one of the woredas in the South Ethiopia Regional State. It is named after Nyangatom people who live at this woreda. Part of the Debub Omo Zone, Nyangatom is bordered on the south by Kuraz, on the west by the Ilemi Triangle (claimed by Ethiopia, Kenya and Sudan), on the northwest by the Bench Maji Zone, on the north by Selamago, and on the east by Hamer. The Omo River is flowing along the northern and western border of Nyangatom. Nyangatom was separated from Kuraz woreda.

== Demographics ==
Based on the 2007 Census conducted by the CSA, this woreda has a total population of 17,640, of whom 8,893 are men and 8,747 women; none of its population are urban dwellers. The majority of the inhabitants practiced traditional beliefs, with 58.95% of the population reporting that belief, 32.96% were Protestants, and 1.22 practiced Ethiopian Orthodox Christianity.
