= Usno River =

River in Ethiopia

Location
- Country: Ethiopia
- Region: SNNPR

Physical characteristics
- Source: Ethiopian Highlands
  - coordinates: 6°27′16″N 36°39′59″E
  - elevation: 2,195 m (7,201 ft)
- Source confluence: Magi and Neri
  - coordinates: 5°36′12″N 36°13′44″E
  - elevation: 403 m (1,322 ft)
- Mouth: Omo River
  - coordinates: 5°27′0″N 36°13′17″E
  - elevation: 391 m (1,283 ft)
- Length: 159 km (99 mi)
- Basin size: 5,530 km^{2} (2,140 sq mi)
- Discharge
  - location: Mouth
  - average: 25.89 m^{3}/s (914.4 cu ft/s)
  - minimum: 8.99 m^{3}/s (317.5 cu ft/s)
  - maximum: 39.29 m^{3}/s (1,388 cu ft/s)

Basin features
- Progression: Omo → Lake Turkana
- River system: Omo Basin
- Population: 378,000
- Tributaries
  - left: Neri
  - right: Magi

The Usno River is a tributary of the Omo River in Ethiopia. Formed by the confluence of the Magi and the Neri rivers, it flows south past the Nyalibong Hills before entering the Omo. Almost all of the Usno's course is inside the boundaries of the Mago National Park.

== See also ==
- List of Ethiopian rivers
