= Mago River =

River in southern Ethiopia

Mago River (or Magi River) is a river of southern Ethiopia.

It is entirely located in the Debub Omo Zone of the Southern Nations, Nationalities, and People's Region. It joins the Neri River to form the Usno River, a tributary of the Omo River.

Adjacent to part of the river is the Mago National Park.

The Mursi people live along the river.

== See also ==
- List of rivers of Ethiopia
