= Mount Smith (Ethiopia) =

Mountain in Ethiopia

- Location within Ethiopia

Highest point
- Elevation: 2,560 m (8,400 ft)
- Prominence: 1,684 m (5,525 ft)
- Isolation: 36.52 km (22.69 mi)
- Listing: Ultra
- Coordinates: 6°14′N 36°18′E

Geography
- Country: Ethiopia
- Parent range: Central Ethiopian Highlands

Mount Smith is a mountain located in the South West Ethiopia Peoples' Region, Ethiopia. Mount Smith is an ultra-prominent peak in the Central Ethiopian Highlands and is the 46th highest in Africa. It has an elevation in 2,560 m (8,400 ft).

== See also ==
List of ultras of Africa
