= Dimeka =

Town in South Ethiopia

Dimeka: ዲመካ (Amharic)
- Town
- Location within Ethiopia
- Coordinates: 5°17′29″N 36°54′49″E
- Country: Ethiopia
- Region: South Ethiopia Regional State
- Zone: South Omo Zone
- District: Hamer

Government
  - Mayor: Mr. Wole Alma
- Elevation: 1,757 m (5,764 ft)
- Time zone: UTC+3 (East Africa Time)

Dimeka (Geʽez: ዲመካ) is a town in South Omo Zone, of South Ethiopia Regional State, Ethiopia. The elevation of the town in meter is 1757. The town is the administrative capital of Hamer and also South Omo Zone. Dimeka located at about 839 km from the capital city of Ethiopia, Addis Ababa. The Hailemariam and Roman Foundation which helps women and children located in this town. The town is surrounded by pastoral and semi-pastoral communities.
