= Neri River =

River in Ethiopia

Neri River is a river in southern Ethiopia. It is a tributary of the Mago River, which itself is a tributary of the Omo River.

== See also ==
- List of rivers of Ethiopia
