= Tsamai people =

The Tsamakko people (also spelled Tsemay, Tsamay, Tsemai, or Tsamako) are an ethnic group of southwestern Ethiopia. They speak a Cushitic language called Tsamai, which is one of the Dullay languages, and thus related to the Bussa and Gawwada languages.

According to the 1998 Ethiopian census, the Tsamai number 9,702. The number of speakers of the Tsamai language is 8,621, with 5,298 monolinguals. Many Tsamai use the Konso language for trade purposes.

Most Tsamakko live in the Bena Tsemay woreda of the Debub Omo Zone of the South Ethiopia Region, in the Lower Omo River Valley and just to the west of the Konso special woreda. Many Tsamakko live in the town of Weyto, which is approximately 50 km from the town of Jinka, on the Konso-Jinka road.

Most Tsamakko are agro-pastoralists, herding cattle and breeders of livestock, such as goats, sheep, cows, and oxen. They are growing crops such as sorghum, corn (maize), wheat, pumpkin, moringa trees, some bananas, cherry tomatoes, and pumpkins. Many Tsamakko women wear clothing made from leather. Many Tsamakko men carry small stools around with them, which they use in case they need to sit down.

They have a very low level of literacy: below 1% in their first language and 2.8% in their second language.

The Tsamai live in an area that is frequented by adventure tours, and thus are a frequently photographed people.
