= Dasenech (woreda) =

- District
- Location within Ethiopia
- Country: Ethiopia

Dasenech is a district of South Ethiopia Regional State.

== See also ==
- Districts of Ethiopia
