= Banna people =

Omotic ethnic group in Ethiopia

Banna
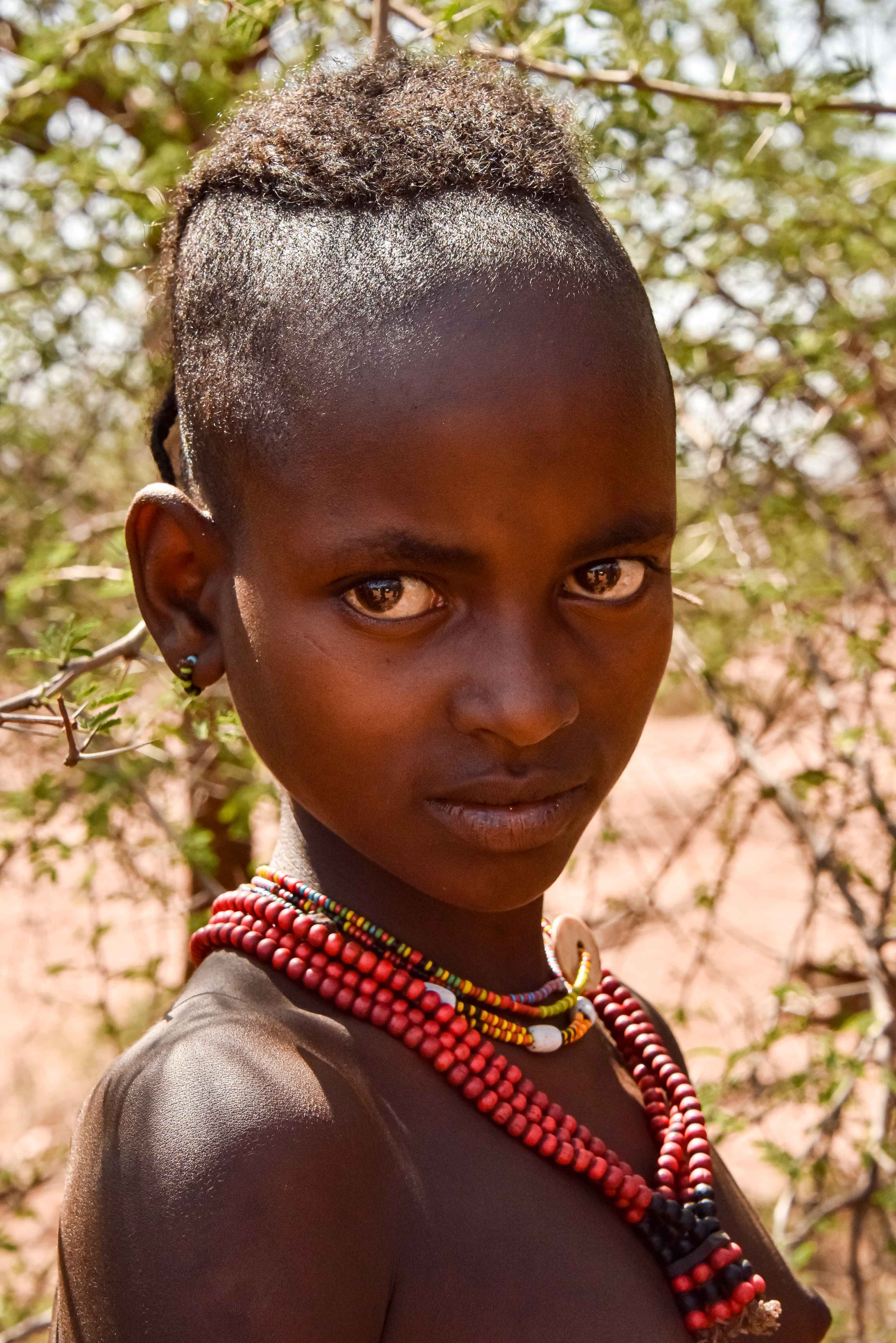
- A Banna child (2019)

Total population
- 52,000

Languages
- Banna

Religion
- Animism

Related ethnic groups
- Hamar

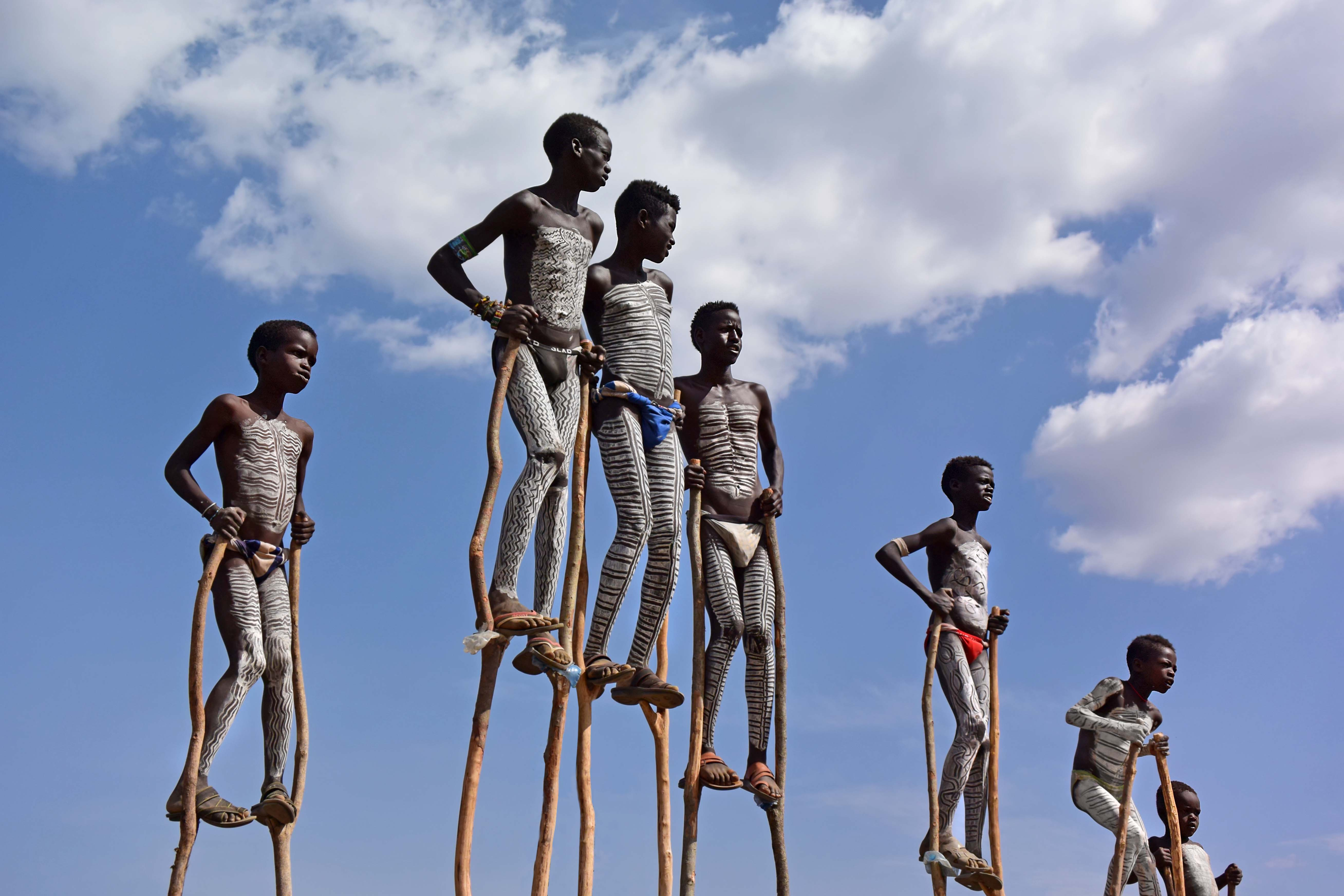
Banna children on stilts (2014)

The Banna people, also Banya, are an Omotic ethnic group in Ethiopia that inhabit the Lower Omo Valley, primarily between the Weyto and Omo rivers. They live in an area between the towns of Gazer and Dimeka, with the traditional area of the Banna being divided into two ritual regions: Ailama (around Gazer) and Anno (spanning from Benata to Dimeka). According to the 2007 census, they number at around 47,000 individuals. They engage primarily in agriculture and supplement this by pastoralism, hunting, and gathering. They are mainly traditionalists, however, a significant share are Christians, and they have their own king.

Most Banna are speakers of the Banna variety of the Hamar-Banna language (a member of the putative Southern branch of the Omotic languages), although some also speak the related Aari language in and around Mokocha and Chali. Some Banna claim only slight difficulty when communicating with speakers of the Hamar and Bashada varieties of the same language, and despite their linguistic proximity there is a clear virtual border to the Banna between themselves and the neighboring Hamar in specific.
