= Hamer language =

South Omotic language spoken primarily by Hamer people in southwestern Ethiopia

Hamer-Banna
- Native to: Ethiopia
- Region: South Omo Region
- Ethnicity: Hamar, Banna, Karo speakers
- Native speakers: 74,000 (2007 census)
- Language family: Afro-Asiatic: Omotic; Aroid; Hamer-Banna
- Dialects: Hamer; Banna; Karo
- Writing system: Geʽez; Latin

Language codes
- ISO 639-3: amf
- Glottolog: hame1242
- ELP: Hamer-Bana-Kara

Hamer or Hamer-Banna (Hamer: hámar aapó) is a language within the South Omotic branch of the Afroasiatic language family. It is spoken primarily in southern Ethiopia by the Hamar people, Banna people, and by speakers of Karo.

Pidgin Hamer
- Native to: Ethiopia
- Native speakers: None
- Language family: Hamer-based pidgin

Language codes
- ISO 639-3: None (mis)
- Glottolog: pidg1260

There is a pidginized variety in local use.

== Phonology ==
=== Consonants ===
There are 26 consonant phonemes in Hamar language. Hamer has six places of articulation for consonants, and eleven manners of articulation, though the system is not entirely orthogonal.

	Bilabial	Alveolar	Palatal	Velar	Uvular	Glottal
Plosive	p b	t d		k g	q	ʔ
Implosive	ɓ	ɗ		ɠ		
Ejective		tʼ	tʃʼ			
Fricative		s z	ʃ	x		h
Affricate		ts	tʃ dʒ			
Nasal	m	n	ɲ			
Flap		ɾ				
Lateral		l				
Semivowel	w		j			

There are sounds in the Hamar language are noteworthy because they represent uncommon phonetic features not found in many languages:

ɓ: Bilabial implosive (geɓí ‘many’)

ɠ: The velar implosive is found in just one word (ɠiá ‘hit’) and is regarded as rare. It appears in several light verb constructions, such as waakí ɠiá meaning "herd the cattle" (literally "hit cow"), and ɲuurí ɠiá meaning "churn the butter" (literally "hit the butter container"), among others.

ɗ: Dental alveolar implosive (ɗánga ‘throat’)

t’: Alveolar ejective (déetʼa ‘heavy’)

ɲ: Palato-alveolar nasal (háɲa ‘fat-tailed sheep’)

c’: Palato-alveolar ejective (pacʼ ‘many’)

Sixteen phonemes, including /p/, /b/, /t/, /j/, /k/, /q/, /ɓ/, /cʼ/, /s/, /z/, /sh/, /x/, /m/, /n/, /l/, and /r/, are found in word-final positions. In contrast, /d/, /c/, /g/, /ɗ/, /ɠ/, /tʼ/, and /ɲ/ have not been observed in this position.

/p/ may optionally be realized as [ɸ] in any position, except as /pp/ and /mp/, in which cases it is always realized as [p]. Several phonemes have special intervocalic or prevocalic realizations:

/VbV/	[β]
/Vka/	[x]
/#qa/	[qʼ]
/#qo/, /#qu/	[ʔ]
/VɓV/	[b], [β]
/VɗV/	[d], [ʔ]
/#tʼa/, /#tʼi/	[ʦʼ]
/VtʃʼV/	[tʃ]

/n/ assimilates to a following velar (i.e., as [ŋ]).

Consonant length is distinctive non-initially. Long /ɾ/ is realized as a trilled /r/.

=== Consonant gemination ===
Over 24 consonant phonemes, 14 have been attested geminated (/p/, /b/, /t/, /d/, /c/, /k/, /g/, /ɓ/, /ɗ/, /s/, /sh/, /n/, /m/, /l/)

Grammatically, gemination occurs when the feminine and plural suffixes /-no/ and /-na/ are added to nominal roots that end in a sonorant segment (like /n/, /l/, etc.). This process causes the final consonant of the root to become geminated, meaning it is pronounced longer than usual.

Geminated consonants are phonetically longer than regular consonants. Some minimal pairs are provided to illustrate the difference between geminated and non-geminated consonants:

kótte: shirt

kóte: here

ʔóito: female name

ʔóitto: the fourth

Thus, consonant gemination not only affects the length of sounds but can also distinguish word meanings.

=== Vowels ===
There are seven basic vowels:

	Front	Central	Back
Close	i iː		u uː
Close-mid	e eː		o oː
Open-mid	ɛ ɛː		ɔ ɔː
Open		a aː	

The length of vowels is phonemically important in the language, and vowel duration is shown by writing the vowel symbol twice.

The vowels are further subdivided into two main categories (with a third being a surface "umlaut" phenomenon (see below)). Category I vowels are shorter, pharyngealized, and have retracted tongue root. Category II vowels are longer, glottalized, and have advanced tongue root.

Vowel Harmony exists in that every root word and every suffix belongs to either category I or II. When the category of a root and its suffix do not agree, a kind of umlauting takes place. An umlauted vowel retains its basic place of articulation, and is pronounced between the corresponding category I and II vowels, i.e. of medium length, and unmarked for pharyngealization, glottalization or tongue root position. Generally, the vowel(s) of the suffix undergo umlauting, but there is a set of "strong" suffixes which retain their category, and cause the vowels of the root to undergo umlauting.

There is a sixth non-phonemic vowel, /ə/, which appears in speech epenthetically to "break up" otherwise invalid consonant clusters. There is no need to consider this a phoneme, and no definitive reason for it to require a grapheme, as it occurs entirely predictably as part of what is essentially an allophonic process.

==== Mid-low vowels ====
Mid-low vowels (like ɛ and ɔ) and mid-high vowels (like e and o) are used in different situations. Mid-high vowels are used in stressed syllables, and if they're followed by the low vowel /a/, they are pronounced as mid-low vowels.

Mid-low vowels come from two processes: vowel combination and a rule for masculine forms of words. Because of this, mid-low vowels play an important role in the language.

In such cases, the quality of the vowel changes due to the suffixes, and this can alter the meaning of the word. These phonological changes occur according to the grammatical structure of the Hamar language.

==== Diphthongs ====
There are four closing diphthongs (/ai/, /au/, /ei/, /oi/), and one opening diphthong (/ia/).

=== Syllable and word structure ===
Hamar has four possible phonemic syllable types:

CV qu.lí ‘goat’

CVV káa.ra ‘fish’

CVC kár.cʼa ‘cheek’

CVVC déer ‘red’

Syllable structure is simply (C)V(C), though syllable-final consonants are rare. Strings of at least three vowels are documented. Strings of more than two consonants are not documented. There are a large number of (mostly very simple) rules governing metathesis and epenthesis when consonant clusters appear. In summary, there are three sorts of consonant cluster: "valid", "special", and "invalid". Valid clusters undergo no change between their underlying and surface forms. Special clusters undergo some kind of (generally metathetic) transformation in their surface forms. Invalid clusters insert a non-phonemic /ə/ between the two consonants to create their surface forms.

== Orthography ==
There is no official writing system for Hamer, though several romanization schemes have been proposed, along with a Gə'əz orthography. As yet, there is no movement for official recognition of any of these systems.

=== "Lydall" romanization ===
This is the romanization used by Jean Lydall. It is perhaps the de facto standard, simply by being the one in which the majority of the existing corpus is presented.

==== Consonants ====
	Bilabial	Alveolar	Palatal	Velar	Uvular	Glottal
Pulmonic Stops	b p	d t	j c	g k		'
Ejective Stop					q'	
Ingressive Stops	B	D		G		
Fricatives	f	z s	š	x		h
Affricate		ts				
Nasals	m	n	ɲ	ŋ		
Flap		r				
Lateral		l				
Semivowels	w		y			

==== Category I vowels ====
ɪ				ʊ
	ɛ		ɔ	
		ʌ		

==== Category II vowels ====
i				u
	e		o	
		a		

==== Umlauted vowels ====
Vowels which have been umlauted are written using the letter for their original sound, combined with an underline.

No marking of stress occurs.

=== Gə'əz orthography ===
Letters are provided below with their traditional Amharic names. Rows marked in dark red have special meanings that cannot fully be explained in the table: the ʾÄlf row is used for Category II vowels without a preceding consonant, while the ʿÄyn row is used for Category I vowels without a preceding consonant.

		ä [ə]	u	i	a	e	ə [ɨ]	o	wa	yä [jə]
Hoy	h	ሀ	ሁ	ሂ	ሃ	ሄ	ህ	ሆ		
Läwe	l	ለ	ሉ	ሊ	ላ	ሌ	ል	ሎ	ሏ	
Ḥäwt	x	ሐ	ሑ	ሒ	ሓ	ሔ	ሕ	ሖ	ሗ	
May	m	መ	ሙ	ሚ	ማ	ሜ	ም	ሞ	ሟ	ፙ
Śäwt	ʃ	ሠ	ሡ	ሢ	ሣ	ሤ	ሥ	ሦ	ሧ	
Rəʾs	ɾ	ረ	ሩ	ሪ	ራ	ሬ	ር	ሮ	ሯ	ፘ
Sat	s	ሰ	ሱ	ሲ	ሳ	ሴ	ስ	ሶ	ሷ	
Ḳaf	q'	ቀ	ቁ	ቂ	ቃ	ቄ	ቅ	ቆ	ቋ	
Bet	b	በ	ቡ	ቢ	ባ	ቤ	ብ	ቦ	ቧ	
	ɓ	በ፟	ቡ፟	ቢ፟	ባ፟	ቤ፟	ብ፟	ቦ፟	ቧ፟	
Täwe	t	ተ	ቱ	ቲ	ታ	ቴ	ት	ቶ	ቷ	
	c	ቸ	ቹ	ቺ	ቻ	ቼ	ች	ቾ	ቿ	
Nähas	n	ነ	ኑ	ኒ	ና	ኔ	ን	ኖ	ኗ	
ʾÄlf	ʾ	አ	ኡ	ኢ	ኣ	ኤ	እ	ኦ	ኧ	
Kaf	k	ከ	ኩ	ኪ	ካ	ኬ	ክ	ኮ	ኳ	
Wäwe	w	ወ	ዉ	ዊ	ዋ	ዌ	ው	ዎ		
ʿÄyn	ʿ	ዐ	ዑ	ዒ	ዓ	ዔ	ዕ	ዖ		
Zäy	z	ዘ	ዙ	ዚ	ዛ	ዜ	ዝ	ዞ	ዟ	
Yämän	y	የ	ዩ	ዪ	ያ	ዬ	ይ	ዮ		
Dänt	d	ደ	ዱ	ዲ	ዳ	ዴ	ድ	ዶ	ዷ	
	ɟ	ጀ	ጁ	ጂ	ጃ	ጄ	ጅ	ጆ	ጇ	
	ɗ	ደ፟	ዱ፟	ዲ፟	ዳ፟	ዴ፟	ድ፟	ዶ፟	ዷ፟	
Gäml	g	ገ	ጉ	ጊ	ጋ	ጌ	ግ	ጎ	ጓ	
	ɠ	ገ፟	ጉ፟	ጊ፟	ጋ፟	ጌ፟	ግ፟	ጎ፟	ጓ፟	
Ṣädäy	t͡s	ጸ	ጹ	ጺ	ጻ	ጼ	ጽ	ጾ	ጿ	
Äf	f	ፈ	ፉ	ፊ	ፋ	ፌ	ፍ	ፎ	ፏ	ፚ
Psa	p	ፐ	ፑ	ፒ	ፓ	ፔ	ፕ	ፖ	ፗ	

== Morphology ==
=== Nouns ===
Nouns do not have inherent gender or number, but may be inflected masculine, feminine, and plural, all three of which are contrastive (that is, a noun cannot be inflected for both a gender and for plurality). While these inflections are not obligatory, they trigger agreement on adjectives and verbs. The inflection markers are:

Masculine	Feminine	Plural
-â, -tâ	-no, -tóno	-na

The forms beginning with "t" may only be attached directly to the root, and are usually used with animate nouns. The other forms may be attached to the root or to the stem.

For inanimate nouns, marked masculinity is usually diminutive, while marked femininity is augmentative. E.g., a clay pot is dáa. Daatâ (masculine) signifies a small clay pot, while dáano (feminine) is a large clay pot. Cross-linguistically, the use of masculine as diminutive is unusual, as is free gender inflection.

=== Verbs ===
Aspect and tense are primarily conveyed through grammatical structures, such as multi-word expressions, repetition of verb stems, auxiliary verbs, and the combination of verb bases with specific markers. Aspect is not indicated in negative forms or in questions asking for specific information, which instead differentiate only between past and non-past. The language uses two aspect markers: the perfective marker -de, which represents a complete event with clear time limits, and the imperfective marker -da, which describes events without defined temporal boundaries.

Imperative: The verb root combines with -á to address a single individual. The verb root combines with -é to address multiple individuals. For example: gi-á! (say, IMP.2SG), gi-é! (say-IMP.2PL).

=== Adverbs ===
In the Hamer-Banna language, as with many other languages, adverbs are used to modify verbs, adjectives, or other adverbs to provide more detailed information about actions, qualities, or other circumstances. Below are examples of locational, temporal, and manner adverbs using different words in the context of the Hamer-Banna language.

temporal adverbs: iní (earlier, before), táaki (now), beré (later)

manner adverbs: sun (just, simply), bish (only)

locational adverbs: óo (there), cóo (down)

=== Adjectives ===
Hamar has two categories of adjectives: those derived from nouns (adjectival nouns) and those formed from verbs (de-verbal adjectives). Adjectives in Hamar can serve as either the main element (head) or as a descriptive element (modifier) in a phrase. Most adjectives are noun-like in nature: they typically end in a consonant or the vowels -a, -e, -i, or -o and are marked for masculine, feminine, and plural through noun-like inflection patterns.

Nouns	Verbs
qáji 'cold'	qajá 'become/be cold'
dúrpi 'fat'	durpá 'become fat'

=== Postpositions ===
Body part terms act as locative noun phrases within a genitive construction, forming postpositional phrases to convey spatial relationships like 'inside,' 'back,' 'behind,' 'on top of,' 'through,' and similar expressions. For example, the postposition íinte ʻinsideʼ contains the body part noun ii ʻstomachʼ followed by the locative case -te, and it can be analysed as follows:

íi (stomach) - n (F.OBL) - te (LOC): in the stomach > inside

=== Numerals ===
The Hamar language employs a base-ten numeral system for numbers from one to nineteen and a base-twenty system for numbers greater than nineteen. The concept of 'zero' is represented by the noun gur. The act of counting is described by the verb paidá. Alongside the traditional numeral system, Hamar also uses a quicker system incorporating borrowed numbers from Amharic. Interestingly, there is no native word in Hamar for 'number,' so younger speakers often adopt the Amharic term qutʼər.
