= Aari language =

Omotic language spoken in Ethiopia

Aari
- አፋን፡ኣሪ፡ (Áfan Ārí)
- Native to: Ethiopia
- Region: north central Omo Region
- Ethnicity: Aari
- Native speakers: 290,000 (2007)
- Language family: Afro-Asiatic: Omotic; South; Aari
- Dialects: Bako; Biyo; Laydo; Seyki; Sido; Zeddo; Shangama; Wubahamer
- Writing system: Geʽez, Latin

Language codes
- ISO 639-3: aiw
- Glottolog: aari1239

Aari (also rendered Ari, Ara, Aro, Aarai) is an Omotic language spoken by the Aari people in the South Omo Zone of Ethiopia.

The language consists of 9 dialects: Bako, Biyo (Biya), Laydo, Seyki, Shangama, Sido, Wubahamer, Zeddo.

== History ==
The Aari people suffered considerable pressures to assimilate after the conquest of the Omo River region by the Ethiopian Empire in the late 1800s, which resulted in the widespread adoption of the Amharic language there. Nevertheless, the Aari language survived; today, many Aari are also fluent in Amharic.

== Current status ==
Aari had a population of 285,000 first language speakers in 2007, of whom 129,350 were monolingual. 13,300 second language users were also recorded in 2007. The ethnic population was 289,835 as of 2007.

Aari is used at home and at local markets. The size of the Aari tribe is growing, and thus the Aari language has seen an increase in language use and development in recent years. The language is learned by all of the Aari people and some members of neighboring tribes as well. Many Aari speakers also use Amharic, the official language of Ethiopia.

Although it is widely spoken by Aari people, literacy in the language is low. An orthography has been developed and rolled out in local schools; today, all schools in the two districts where it is spoken teach Aari writing and literature as a subject. An Aari-English-Amharic dictionary has also been published. A translation of the New Testament into Aari was published in 1997.

== Dialects ==
There are nine dialects of the Aari language, each dialect being associated with a former chiefdom. While these dialects are mutually intelligible with one another, some also have distinct features.

The following are dialects of Aari. Alternate names are given in parentheses.

- Bako (Baco)
- Biyo (Bio)
- Gayil (Galila)
- Laydo
- Seyki
- Shangama
- Sido
- Wubahamer (Ubamer)
- Zeddo

== Phonology ==
Aari Consonant Phonemes
		Labial	Alveolar	Palatal	Velar	Uvular	Glottal
Nasal		m	n				
Plosive	voiceless	p	t		k	q	
Plosive	voiced	b	d		g		
Plosive	glottalized	pʼ	ɗ				ʔ
Affricate	pulmonic		ts	tʃ			
Affricate	ejective		tsʼ	tʃʼ			
Fricative	voiceless	f	s	ʃ			
Fricative	voiced		z	ʒ			ɦ
Trill			r				
Approximant		ʋ	l	j			

- Stop sounds /p b/ can have allophones as fricatives [ɸ β].
- /ʋ/ can also be heard as labio-velar [w].

Aari Vowel Phonemes
	Front	Back
High	i	u
Mid	e	o
Low	a	

Aari has two tones, high and low.

== Grammar ==
Aari is a subject-object-verb language (SOV), meaning that the English sentence "the cow (subject) ate (verb) the grass (object)" would translate back from Aari as "cow (subject) grass (object) ate (verb)."

=== Verbs ===
In Aari, the suffix -sis can be applied to the stem of most verbs with a causative meaning. Doing so will increase the verb's valency. When applied to an intransitive verb, it will make the verb transitive. For example, the intransitive verb stem daqal- "become bad" with the marker -sis becomes daqalsis-, is transitive and has the causative meaning "make bad". The transitive verb kam- "pick up" with -sis becomes kamsis-, is trivalent and has the meaning "cause to pick up".

=== Example verb conjugation ===
Verb stem buruk, meaning "boil."

The causative stem of buruk- is burukš-, making this verb irregular.

"To boil" is burukinti. This consists of the stem buruk with the infinitive (also called the verbal noun suffix) -inti.

The causative third-person singular perfect (past tense) of burukinti is búrukse ("it boiled").

The present tense is búrukše, "he boils [something]."

A sentence can be formed with the verb buruk by adding a noun as an object (something being boiled). Búrukše... means "he boiled...", so "he boiled water" would be noqá búrukše.

Note that in Aari the object comes before the verb; búrukše noqá is not correct.

== Orthography ==
Aari uses a Latin script and an Ethiopic script, but below 10% of Aari speakers can read. Schooling is not well developed in this region of the world, so Aari is mostly spoken rather than written down and most speakers have no use for the language's two writing systems. However, despite this, there are schools in numerous villages and there are efforts to promote education and literacy. At present, 8% of second language users are literate in Aari.

The New Testament was translated into Aari in 1997. Additionally, some other books have been translated into Aari to help promote literacy; Genesis Exodus, 1 & 2 Samuel, 1 & 2 Kings, Esther, Ruth, Psalms, Leviticus, Joshua and Judges have all been translated into Aari, but at present only Genesis has been published. Some external organizations are working with Aari churches to write a complete Aari Bible and increase the literacy rate.

== Vocabulary ==
- laqimiu? - how are you?
- laqimi - reply to laqimiu
- noqá - water (Sido dialect: loqa)
- waakí - cattle
- zémma - morning
- gurdá - fence
- sónqa - kiss
- tóoni - waste
- wókka - axe
- endefsi - brother
- enani - sister
- abiya - father
- emiya - mother
- hanna - you
- etsimi - food
- fecha - land
- kiee - husband
- ekina - cabbage
- hami - farm land
- wollaqa - one
- qastan - two
- makkan - three
- noo - fire
- háy - sun
- arpén - moon
- zomí (or maqás) - blood
- adím - tongue
- atsí - tooth
- muda - all
- muuda - sorrow

== Bibliography ==
- Hayward, Richard (1990). "Notes on the Aari Language". In Hayward, Richard (ed.). Omotic Language Studies. London: School of Oriental and African Studies. pp. 425–493. ISBN 9780728601666.
- Røsok, Marie Iversdatter (2016). /qààmîsték ʋúúrsìté/ The Sound Pattern of Aari (Master's thesis). University of Oslo. hdl:10852/54038.
