= Maale people =

Ethnic group in Ethiopia

Total population
- 22,000

Regions with significant populations
- South Omo Zone, South Ethiopia Regional State, Ethiopia

Languages
- Maale language

The Maale people (also spelled Male; pronounced /ˈmɑːle/) are an ethnic group based in South Omo Zone, South Ethiopia Regional State, Ethiopia. As of 2025, they numbered 22,000 people. The Maale are predominantly pastoralists, who raise large herds of cattle for dairy production and wealth storage, and agro-pastoralists, who produce large quantity of maize, groundnut, and sorghum.

The Maale are primarily located in the Southern Ethiopia Regional States of Ethiopia, bordered in the north with both Gamo Zone and Gofa Zone and south with BennaTsemay Woreda of the South Omo Zone, in the east with Aleze Zone and in west with Ari Zone of Ethiopia.

The Maale people are maintaining their language vigorously, despite exposure to outside pressures and languages.

== Culture and expression ==
Many of the practices related to the women of the Maale have been documented by Thubauville (2010), including the differences between traditional and contemporary practices.

They have a gender called ashtime. There are opposing scholarly interpretations of the role and significance of this. Epprecht believes that they are male assigned at birth individuals who behave as women and also have sex with men. But he admits that the description by Donham (who had actually lived and worked among the Maale), is quite different, that the duty of an ashtime was to allow the king to have sex "protected from even the merest whiff of female sexuality at key moments in the ritual life of the nation".
