= Aari people =

Omotic tribe in southerwestern Ethiopia

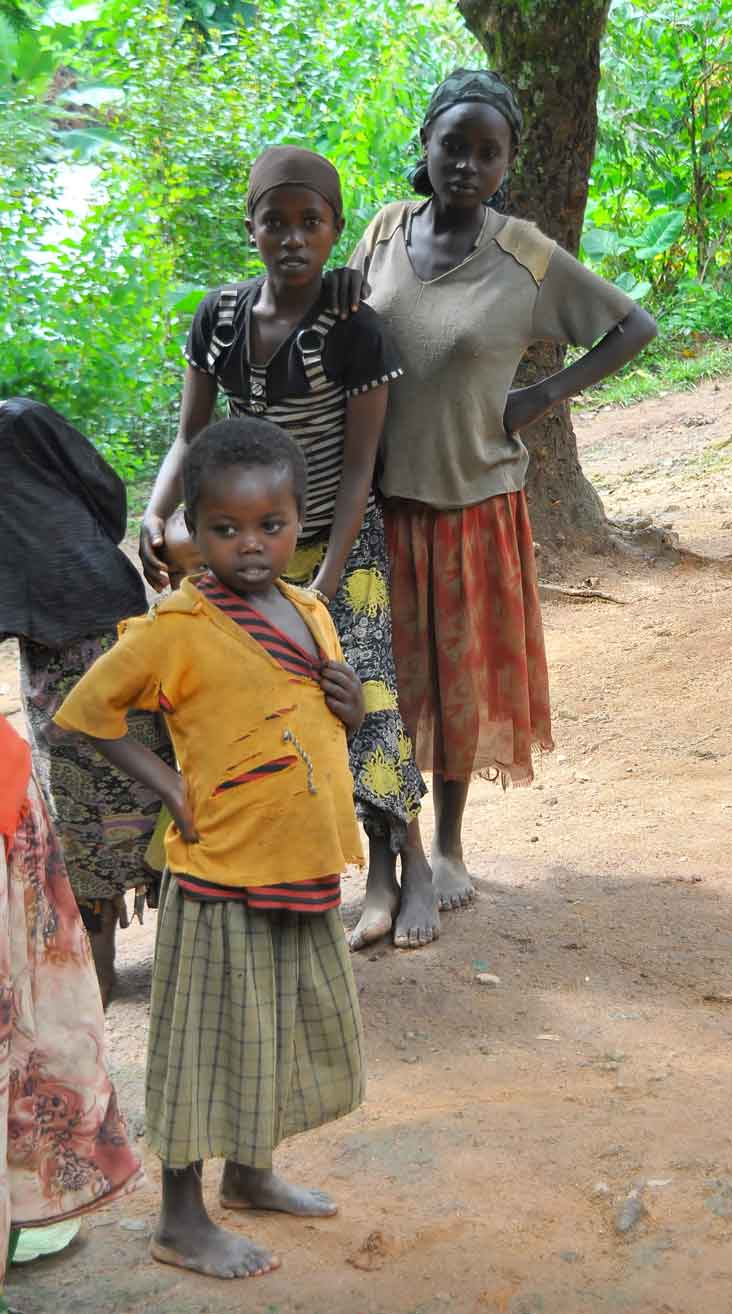
Aari children in Ethiopia

Aari or Ari are a tribal Omotic people indigenous to Omo Valley of Ethiopia. According to 2007 census there are 289,835 ethnic Aari in Ethiopia, which makes up around 0.29% of the country's total population. Nearly all Aari speak the South Omotic Aari language, though more than half of them are multilingual and can also speak other languages such as Amharic.

== History ==
Until the 19th century, Aari people lived under independent chiefdoms. The divine ruler of the Aari tribal societies were called baabi.

In the late 1800s, the Omo River region was conquered by the Ethiopian Empire under Emperor Menelik II of Ethiopia, which resulted in the widespread adoption of Amharic culture and the Amharic language there. By the early 1900s, the Amhara rulers had consolidated their control over the region and many Aari became serfs. Aari culture experienced significant decline during this time, although it and the Aari language survived. In 1974 Derg, a Soviet-backed militia, overthrew the monarchy. The revolution brought down the feudal system under which the Aari had been forced to live, which allowed farming communities to keep their harvests and livestock and resulted in improved prosperity. After the Derg was overthrown in 1991, Ethiopia adopted a federalist system that granted self-determination to the country's ethnic groups, allowing the Aari to reclaim a degree of sovereignty over their lands. Particularly since 2000, the Aari's social and economic situations have improved dramatically and interest in education has flourished; most Aari towns today have at least one primary school.

== Society ==
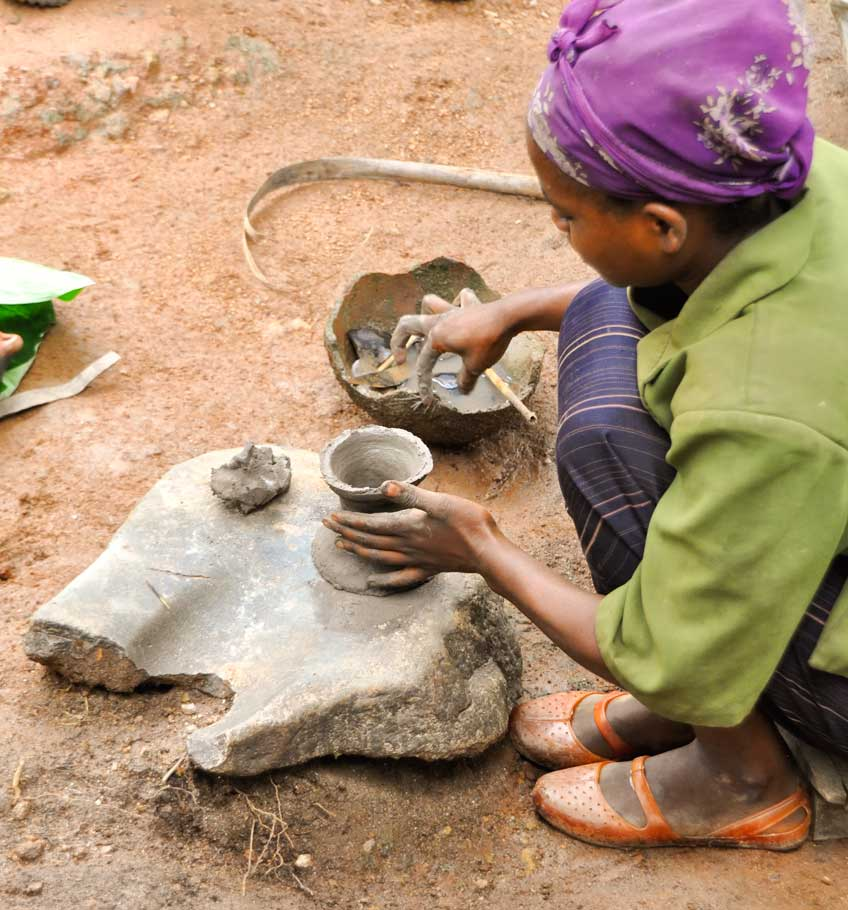
The Aari, like many other Omotic speakers of Ethiopia, have largely preserved their traditional lifestyles, particularly due to their isolation from outside groups.

=== Caste system ===
The Ari peoples of Ethiopia comprise different occupational groups and their society is socially divided and stratified according to each Aari individual's respective occupation. The lower castes of the society are composed of potters, tanners and blacksmiths and collectively named as mana in the Aari language. Blacksmiths (faka mana) who also do woodworking are marginalized and occupy an inferior position to tanners and potters (tila mana). Kantsa is the name given to the agriculturalist caste which holds a privileged position in the society. Intermarriage between mana and katsa is forbidden and considered as taboo according to Ari customs. The occupational segregation and caste-based endogamy practiced among the Ari have been revealed by advances in archaeogenetics to be one the oldest continuous caste systems in existence. After the introduction of Christianity the social division between Christian Aari belonging to differing castes has been reported to have become less important. More of the societies make agriculture their livelihood, and most of them practice mixed farming.

=== Religion ===
After conquest by the Ethiopian Empire in the late 1800s, many Aari were forced to convert to Ethiopian Orthodox Christianity, although this religion became heavily stigmatized due to its association with the invading forces and perceived economic exploitation by Orthodox priests, although there are still some followers among the Aari. In the 1950s, large numbers became Protestants as a result of Western missionary work (especially by SIM). Today, the vast majority of Aari Christians are Protestants. There are still followers of traditional beliefs.

== See also ==
- List of ethnic groups in Ethiopia
- Welayta people
