= Tsamai language =

Afroasiatic language

Tsamai
- Tsamako
- Native to: Ethiopia
- Region: Omo River region
- Ethnicity: Tsamai
- Native speakers: 18,000 (2007 census)
- Language family: Afro-Asiatic: Cushitic; East; Dullay; Tsamai
- Writing system: Latin

Language codes
- ISO 639-3: tsb
- Glottolog: tsam1247 Tsamai dume1236 Dume
- ELP: Ts'amay

Tsamai (also known as Ts'amay, S'amai, Tamaha, Tsamako, Tsamakko, Bago S'amakk-Ulo) is an Afroasiatic language spoken in Ethiopia. Tsamai is a member of the Dullay dialect continuum. Cule (Kuile, Kule) and evidently Dume (pseudo-pygmies) were apparently varieties.
