= Baale language =

Surmic language spoken in Ethiopia and South Sudan

Baale
- Balesi
- Kacipo
- Native to: South Sudan, Ethiopia
- Region: Ethiopian–South Sudanese border, Boma Plateau in South Sudan
- Ethnicity: Zilmamo, Kichepo
- Native speakers: (9,100 cited 2000–2010)
- Language family: Nilo-Saharan?: Eastern Sudanic?; Southern Eastern?; Surmic; South; Southwest; Baale
- Dialects: Kacipo; Zilmamu; Balesi; Olam (Ngaalam)

Language codes
- ISO 639-3: koe
- Glottolog: baal1234
- ELP: Baale

The Baale language, Baleesi or Baalesi is a Surmic language spoken by the Baale or Zilmamo people of Ethiopia, and by the Kachepo of South Sudan. It is a member of the southwest branch of the Surmic cluster; the self-name of the language and the community is Suri, which is the same as that of the Suri language, evoking an ethnonym that embraces the Tirma, Chai (or T'id), and Baale communities, although linguistically the languages of these communities are different. There are currently 9,000 native speakers of Baleesi, 5,000 in South Sudan and 4,100 in Ethiopia; almost all of these are monolingual.

Yigezu (2005) notes that although Baale is genetically a Southwest Surmic language, it has taken on many features of Southeast Surmic languages due to heavy contact.

== General information ==
Baleesi can be alternately referred to as Baalesi, Baale, Bale, Baaye, Dok, Kacipo-Balesi, Kachepo, Silmamo, Tsilmano, Zelmamu, Zilmamu and Zulmamu.

"The Baale call their language Baalesi. They are also referred to as Zilmamo, which is the name of their country, situated west and south of Jeba town, towards the border with Sudan. The Gimira call the Baale people and their language Baaye, whereas the Anywak refer to them as Dok. The Baale people call the neighboring Dizi people Saara, and the Amhara are referred to as Goola. Baale is also spoken across the border in Sudan, in an area known as Kachepo, which is the name used by the neighboring Toposa, Juje, and Murle for the Baale people and their country."

There are no known dialects of Baleesi, but it is closely related to the Didinga-Murle cluster, which consists of Didinga, Tennet, and Larim in Sudan, and Murle in both Sudan and Ethiopia. It shares 40%-54% lexical similarity with Murle and 35% lexical similarity with Mursi.

It is spoken in Rumeat, Upper Boma, and Mewun villages, Pibor County, Boma State, located near the Ethiopian border. It is also spoken in the northwestern corner of East Equatoria State.

The Baleesi counting system is based on twenty and uses the same quinary system as does the Didinga-Murle cluster. The word for "1,000" literally means "plenty," and everything greater than 100 is referred to as "a lot."

While the Tirma, Chai, and Baale people form an ethnic unit called Suri, sharing similar age-set systems, common ceremonies, and material cultures, their languages are only distantly related.

There is no known writing system for Baleesi and it is regarded as an unwritten language. The language status is classified as vigorous, meaning that it is unstandardized and in use by all ages. However, it may still be considered an endangered language due to the relatively small population of native speakers in existence.

== Speakers ==
The Baale have a positive attitude towards their language, and use it in most areas of life besides the market. Some Baale people can speak Tirma or Chai along with Baleesi, and a few also speak Dizi or Amharic.

Speakers of Baleesi include non-native individuals as well. In Jeba town, there are Dizi people who speak Baleesi as a second language, and often serve as intermediaries between local or regional traders and the Baale people when they come to the market.

The literacy rate of both first-language and second-language speakers is below 1%.

=== Culture ===
The Baale share many aspects of culture with their fellow Suri people. For example, a practice common among the tribes of the Surma (including the Baale), is the insertion of a clay plate into the bottom lip of young girls and women. Another ritual the Suri take part in is called the Donga, which involves champions of teams from different clans and villages fighting in pairs using long wooden sticks. The ritual is used as a way to resolve conflicts on either an individual or higher level.
