= List of ethnic groups in Ethiopia =

This is a list of ethnic groups in Ethiopia that are officially recognized by the government. It is a list taken from the 2007 Ethiopian National Census: Population size and percentage of Ethiopia's total population according to the 1994 and 2007 censuses follows each entry.

Ethiopia's population is highly diverse, containing over 80 different ethnic groups. Most people in Ethiopia speak Afro-Asiatic languages, mainly of the Cushitic and Semitic branches. The former includes the Oromo and Somali, and the latter includes the Amhara and Tigray. Together these four groups make up three-quarters of the population.

The country also has Omotic ethnic groups who speak Afro-Asiatic languages of the Omotic branch. They inhabit the southern regions of the country, particularly the Southern Nations, Nationalities and Peoples' Region. Among these are the Welayta and Gamo.

Groups from the hypothetical Nilo-Saharan group, especially Nilotic ethnic groups also inhabit the southwestern regions of the country, particularly in the Gambela Region. Among these are the Nuer and Anuak who are also found in South Sudan which borders the Gambela Region. However, according to Glottolog, many of those comprise small language families or isolates, such as Surmic languages Kwegu, Me'en, and Suri, and the isolate Berta.

== Ethnic Groups in Ethiopian censuses ==
Ethnic group	Linguistic grouping	Census 1994		Census 2007	
Ethnic group	Linguistic grouping	Number	%	Number	%
Aari	Omotic	155,002	0.29	290,453	0.39
Afar	Cushitic	979,367	1.84	1,276,374	1.73
Agaw-Awi	Cushitic	397,491	0.75	631,565	0.85
Silt'e	Semitic	939,457		1,135,306	1.27
Agaw-Hamyra	Cushitic	158,231	0.30	267,851	0.36
Alaba	Cushitic	125,900	0.24	233,299	0.32
Amhara	Semitic	16,007,933	30.13	19,870,651	26.89
Anuak	Nilotic	45,665	0.09	85,909	0.12
Arbore	Cushitic	6,559	0.01	6,840	0.01
Argobba	Semitic	62,831	0.12	140,134	0.19
Bacha (Kwego)	Eastern Sudanic			2,632	< 0.01
Basketo	Omotic	51,097	0.10	78,284	0.11
Bench	Omotic	173,123	0.33	353,526	0.48
Berta	Nilo-Saharan			183,259	0.25
Bodi	Eastern Sudanic	4,686	0.01	6,994	0.01
Brayle	????			5,002	0.01
Burji	Cushitic	46,565	0.09	71,871	0.10
Beta Israel	Semitic	2,321	<0.01		
Chara	Cushitic	6,984	0.01	13,210	0.02
Daasanach	Cushitic	32,099	0.06	48,067	0.07
Dawro	Omotic	331,483	0.62	543,148	0.74
Debase/ Gawwada	Omotic	33,971	0.06	68,600	0.09
Dirashe	Omotic			30,081	0.04
Dime	Omotic	6,197	0.01	891	<0.01
Dizi	Omotic	21,894	0.04	36,380	0.05
Donga	Nilo-Saharan			35,166	0.05
Fedashe	????	7,323	0.01	3,448	< 0.01
Gabra	Cushitic	616,664	1.30	1,105,160	1.45
Gamo	Omotic	719,847	1.35	1,107,163	1.50
Gebato	????	75	<0.01	1,502	< 0.01
Gedeo	Cushitic	639,905	1.20	986,977	1.34
Gedicho	????			5,483	0.01
Gidole	Cushitic	54,354	0.10	41,100	0.06
Goffa	Omotic	241,530	0.45	363,009	0.49
Gumuz	Nilo-Saharan	121,487	0.23	159,418	0.22
Gurage	Semitic	4,290,274	4.31	1,867,377	2.53
Hadiya	Cushitic	927,933	1.75	1,284,373	1.74
Hamar	Omotic	42,466	0.08	46,532	0.06
Harari	Semitic	21,757	0.04	31,869	0.04
Irob	Cushitic			33,372	0.05
Kafficho	Omotic	599,188	1.13	870,213	1.18
Kambaata	Cushitic	499,825	0.94	630,236	0.85
Kebena	Cushitic	35,072	0.07	52,712	0.07
Konta	Omotic			83,607	0.11
Komo	Nilo-Saharan	1,526	<0.01	7,795	0.01
Konso	Cushitic	153,419	0.29	250,430	0.34
Koore	Omotic	107,595	0.20	156,983	0.21
Kontoma	Omotic		0.4	48,543	0.05
Kunama	Nilo-Saharan	2,007	<0.01	4,860	0.01
Karo	Omotic			1,464	< 0.01
Kusumie	Cushitic			7,470	0.01
Kwegu	Nilo-Saharan			4,407	0.01
Male	Omotic	46,458	0.09	98,114	0.13
Mao	Omotic	16,236	0.03	43,535	0.06
Mareqo	Omotic	38,096	0.07	64,381	0.09
Mashola	Omotic			10,458	0.01
Mere	????			14,298	0.02
Me'en	Nilo-Saharan	52,815	0.10	151,489	0.20
Messengo	????	15,341	0.03	10,964	0.01
Majangir	Nilo-Saharan			21,959	0.03
Mossiye	Cushitic	9,207	0.02	19,698	0.03
Murle	Nilo-Saharan			1,469	< 0.01
Mursi	Nilo-Saharan	3,258	0.01	7,500	0.01
Nao	Omotic	4,005	0.01	9,829	0.01
Nuer	Nilotic	64,534	0.12	147,672	0.20
Nyangatom	Nilotic	14,201	0.03	25,252	0.03
Oromo	Cushitic	17,080,318	31.15	24,489,024	33.49
Oyda	Omotic	14,075	0.03	45,149	0.06
Qechem	Nilo-Saharan	2,740	0.01	2,585	< 0.01
Qewama	Nilo-Saharan	141	<0.01	298	< 0.01
She	Omotic	13,290	0.03	320	< 0.01
Shekecho	Omotic	53,897	0.10	77,678	0.11
Sheko	Omotic	23,785	0.04	37,573	0.05
Shinasha	Omotic	32,698	0.06	52,637	0.07
Shita/Upo	Nilo-Saharan	307	<0.01	1,602	< 0.01
Sidama	Cushitic	1,842,314	3.47	2,966,474	4.01
Somali	Cushitic	3,185,266	6.5	4,581,794	8.21
Surma	Nilo-Saharan	19,632	0.04	27,886	0.04
Tigrayans	Semitic	3,284,568	6.18	4,483,892	6.07
Tembaro	Omotic	86,510	0.16	480,573	0.13
Tsamai	Omotic	9,702	0.02	20,046	0.03
Welayta	Omotic	1,269,216	2.39	1,707,079	2.31
Werji	Omotic	20,536	0.04	13,232	0.02
Yem	Omotic	165,184	0.31	160,447	0.22
Zeyese	Omotic	10,842	0.02	17,884	0.02
Zelmam	Nilo-Saharan			2,704	< 0.01
Other/unknown		155,972	0.29	178,799	0.24
Somali				20,227	0.03
Sudanese		2,035	<0.01	10,333	0.01
Eritrean		61,857	0.12	9,736	0.01
Kenyan		134	<0.01	77	<0.01
Djiboutian		367	<0.01	733	<0.01
Other foreigners				15,550	0.02
Total		53,132,276		73,750,932	

== Estimates ==
The World Factbook estimates the ethnic groups of Ethiopia in 2022 as follows

2022 est.
Ethnic Group	%
Oromo	30.1
Amhara	29.8
Somali	7.2
Tigray	5.7
Sidama	4.1
Guragie	2.6
Welaita	2.3
Afar	2.2
Silte	1.3
Kefficho	1.2
other	13.5

== See also ==
- Demographics of Ethiopia
