= Mursi language =

Surmic language spoken by Mursi people in southwestern Ethiopia

Mursi
- ሙነን munɛn
- Native to: Ethiopia
- Region: Central Omo
- Ethnicity: Mursi
- Native speakers: 7,400 (2007 census)
- Language family: Nilo-Saharan?: Eastern Sudanic; Southern Eastern; Surmic; South; Southeast; Pastoral; Mursi
- Writing system: Geʽez, Latin

Language codes
- ISO 639-3: muz
- Glottolog: murs1242
- ELP: Mursi

Mursi (also Dama, Merdu, Meritu, Murzi, Murzu) is a Southeast Surmic language spoken by the Mursi people who live in the South Omo Zone on the eastern side of the lower Omo valley in southwest Ethiopia. The language is similar to Suri, another Southeast Surmic language spoken to the west of the Mursi language area. It is spoken by approximately 7,400 people. According to the 1994 national census, there were 3,163 people who were identified as Mursi in the Southern Nations, Nationalities, and Peoples' Region (SNNPR); 3,158 spoke Mursi as their first language, while 31 spoke it as their second language. According to the analytical volume of the 1994 national census, where Mursi was grouped under Me'en, 89.7% were monolingual, and the second languages spoken were Bench (4.2%), Amharic, which serves as one of the six official languages of Ethiopia. (3.5%), and Kafa (1.1%).

== Classification ==
Mursi is classified as belonging to the Southeast Surmic languages, to which the following other languages also belong: Suri, Me'en and Kwegu. As such, Mursi is also part of the superordinate Eastern Sudanic family of the Nilo-Saharan languages. Mursi is closely related (over 80% cognate) to Me'en, Suri, Kwegu, and tribes in South Sudan such as Murle, Didinga, Tennet and Boya.

== Phonology ==
=== Phoneme inventory ===
The vowel and consonant inventory of Mursi is similar to those of other Southeast Surmic languages, except for the lack of ejectives, the labial fricative /f/ and the voiceless stop /p/.

Consonants of Mursi
		Labial	Alveolar	Postalveolar/ Palatal	Velar	Glottal
Stop	voiceless		t	c ⟨č⟩	k	(ʔ)
Stop	voiced	b	d	ɟ ⟨dʒ⟩	ɡ	
Implosive		ɓ	ɗ			
Fricative	voiceless		s	ʃ		h
Fricative	voiced		z			
Nasal		m	n	ɲ	ŋ	
Liquids			r, l			
Approximant				j	w	

- Except for the hesitant inclusion of the glottal stop /ʔ/ by Firew, both Mütze and Firew agree on the consonant inventory. The layout mostly follows Mütze. The characters in angled brackets are the ones used by Firew, where they differ from Mütze.
- Mütze rejects the phonemic status of the glottal stop [ʔ], claiming that it is phonetically inserted to break up vowel sequences. Firew discusses this and leaves the question undecided, but includes the sound in the phoneme chart.
- Firew classifies the alveolar implosive /ɗ/ as postalveolar, without giving reasons.

Vowels of Mursi
	Front	Central	Back
Close	i		u
Close-mid	e		o
Open-mid	ɛ		ɔ
Open		a	

- Both Mütze and Firew agree on the vowel inventory and on the chosen transcription, as shown above.
- Even though vowel length appears phonetically in Mursi, it can be explained by the elision of weak consonants between identical vowels.

=== Tone ===
Both Mütze and Firew agree that there are only two underlying tone levels in Mursi, as opposed to larger inventories proposed by Turton and Bender and Moges.

== Orthography ==
Two orthographies for the Mursi language exist. One is the Amharic-based, although the Mursi language is one of the Surmic languages with incompatible vowel structures and stressed and unstressed consonants compared to Amharic. The second is the more suitable Latin-based alphabet, developed by David Turton and Moges Yigezu of Addis Ababa University.

== Grammar ==
The Mursi grammar makes use of the following parts of speech: nouns, verbs, adjectives, pronouns, adverbs, adpositions, question words, quantifiers, connectors, discourse particles, interjections, ideophones, and expressives.

=== Nouns ===
Nouns can be inflected for number and case. The number marking system is very complex, using suffixation, suppletion or tone to either mark plurals from singular bases, or singulatives from plural bases. Mursi preverbal subjects and all objects are unmarked, whereas postverbal subjects are marked by a nominative case. Further cases are the oblique case and the genitive case. Modified nouns receive a special morphological marking called construct form by Mütze.

== Bibliography ==
- Worku, Firew Girma (2021). A Grammar of Mursi: A Nilo-Saharan Language of Ethiopia (Thesis). Brill: Leiden. doi:10.1163/9789004449916.
- Yigezu, Moges; Turton, David (2005). "Latin Based Mursi Orthography". ELRC Working Papers. 1 (2). Addis Ababa: Ethiopian Languages Research Center: 242–57.
- Mütze, Bettina (2014). A Sketch of the Mursi Language (MA thesis). Gloucester: Redcliff College, University of Gloucestershire.
- Turton, David; Bender, M. Lionel (1976). "Mursi". In Bender, M. Lionel (ed.). The Non-Semitic Languages of Ethiopia. East Lansing: African Studies Center, Michigan State University. pp. 533–561.
- Turton, David; Moges Yigezu; Oliserali Olibui (2008). Mursi-English-Amharic Dictionary. Addis Ababa: Culture and Arts Society of Ethiopia.
