= Me'en =

Me'en may refer to:

- The Me'en language, a Surmic language of east Africa;
- The Me'en people, a Surma people of east Africa;
