= Murle =

Murle may refer to:

- the Murle people
- the Murle language
