= Surma people =

Cluster of ethnic groups residing in southwestern Ethiopia

Suri (Suri, Mursi, Me'en, Kwegu)
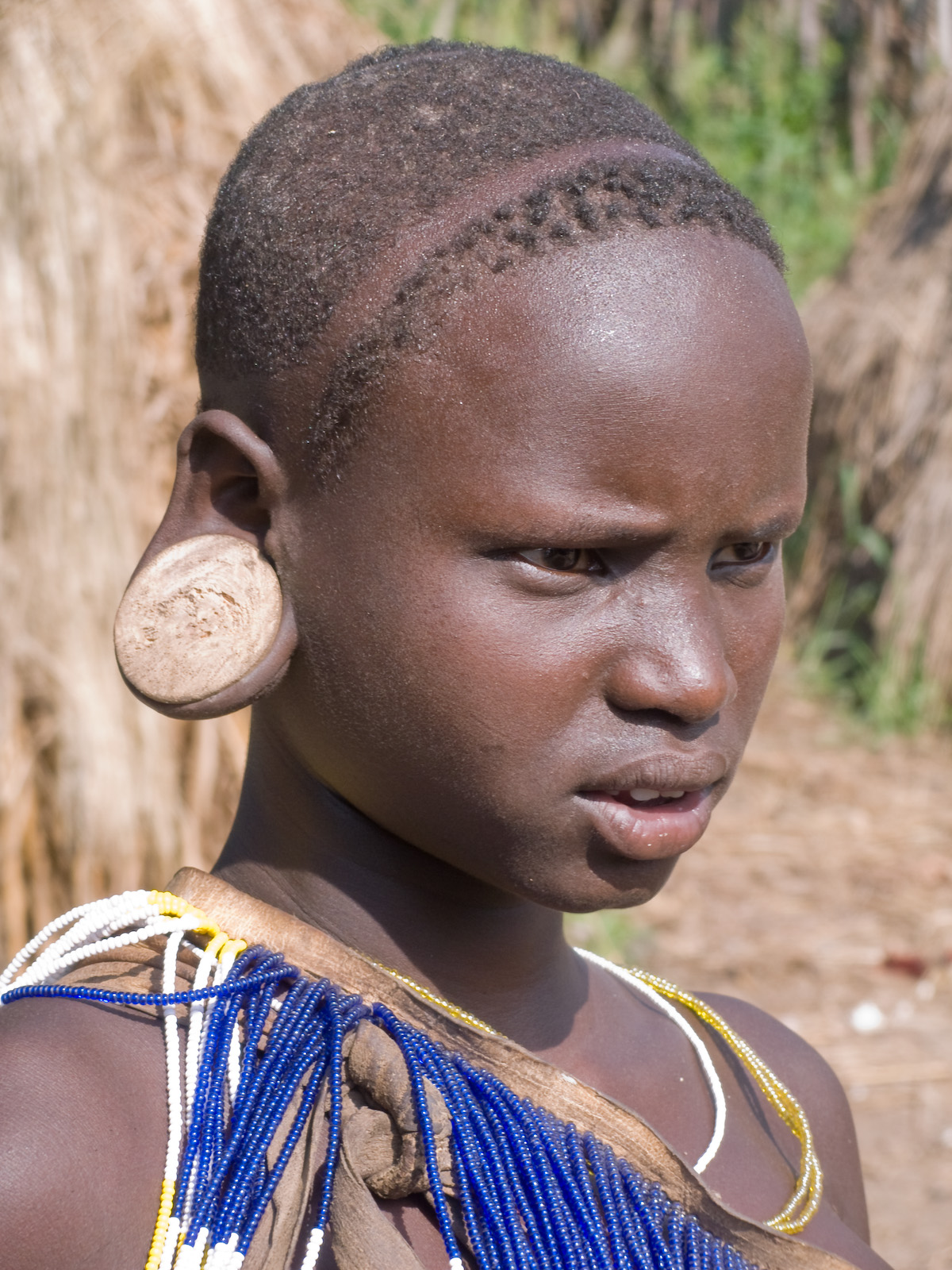
- Suri girl

Total population
- 'Surmic' speakers: 80,000 (1998), 186,875 (2007)

Regions with significant populations
- southwestern Ethiopia, South Sudan

Languages
- Suri, Mursi, Me'en, Kwegu

Religion
- Majority; Animism~98%; Minority; Christianity ~2%

Related ethnic groups
- Other Surmic peoples

Suri is a collective name for three ethnic groups (Chai, Timaga, and Baale) mainly living in Suri woreda, in southwestern Ethiopia. They share many similarities politically, territorially, culturally and economically but speak different languages. They all speak South East Surmic languages within the Nilo-Saharan language family, which includes the Mun, Majang, and Me'en people's languages.

== Overview ==
The term Suri is a collective name for Chai, Timaga, and Baale as expressed in the label "Suri woreda" (= lower administrative district) in southwestern Ethiopia, bordering South Sudan. The 2007 national Ethiopian census figures for ethnic groups distinguish "Suri" from "Mursi" and "Me'enit" (singular of Me'en). Some authors have used the terms "Suri" and "Surma" interchangeably,.

The Suri are an agro-pastoral people and inhabit part of the South western Ethiopia of West Omo Zone Suri woreda in Ethiopia, while the other groups live partly in neighbouring South Sudan. The Suri population was 20,622 in 1998 (census est.) and ca. 32,000 in 2016. The Suri are culturally similarly related to the Mursi.

== Shared culture ==
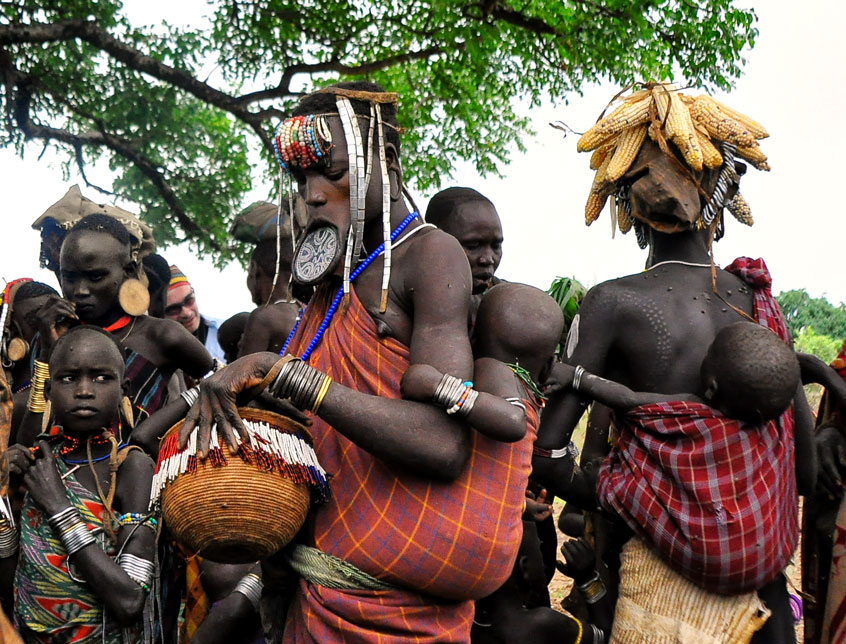
Mursi people

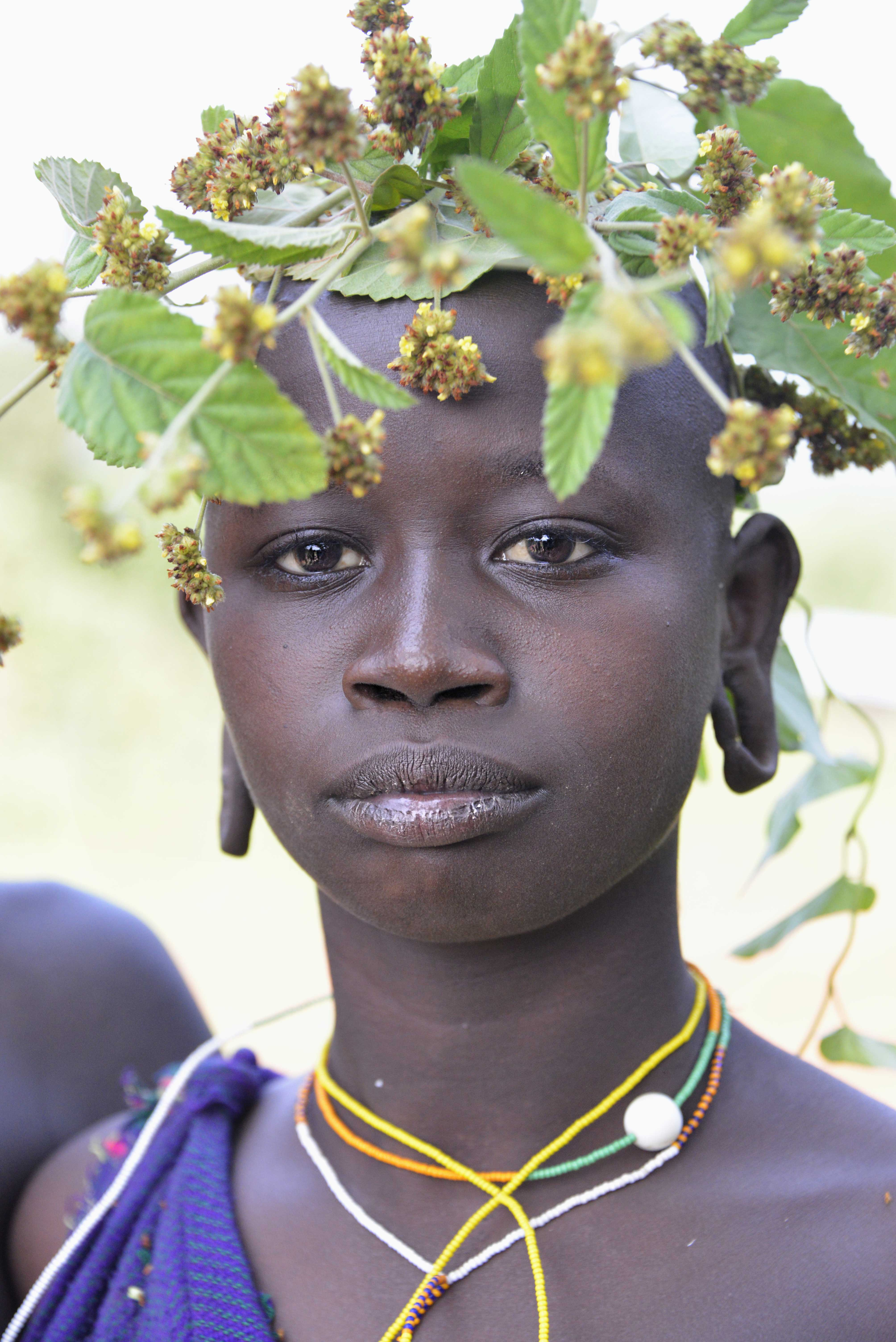
Suri Tribe, Kibish

The Suri groups share a similar culture and show social and historical kinship with the Mursi and Me'en groups. Their homeland is relatively remote, located in semi-arid plains, valleys and foothills.

The Suri have liking for stick fighting called saginé. More properly called "ceremonial duelling", this serves as a rite of passage for young men and brings great prestige; it is especially important when seeking a bride. Such duels are very competitive, at the risk of serious injury and occasional death.

At a young age, to beautify themselves for marriage, most women have their bottom teeth removed and their bottom lips pierced then stretched, so as to allow insertion of a clay lip plate. Some women have stretched their lips so as to allow plates up to sixteen inches in diameter. Increasing with exposure to other cultures, however, a growing number of girls now refrain from this practice. Their children are sometimes painted with (protective) white clay paint, which may be dotted on the face or body.

Suri villages normally range in size from 40 to 1,000 people, but a few may reach 2,500 people. Suri life is egalitarian. The Suri "chiefs" (called komoru) have a ritual function and are merely the most respected elders and have no executive powers. They are elected from within a certain clan lineages. Few Surma are familiar with Amharic, the official language of Ethiopia, and their literacy level is relatively low. In recent decades, however, schools have been built and the number of literate Suri is growing, with several now working in the local administration's district capital and others studying in various towns.

== History ==
According to Suri oral tradition, they came from the Boma Plateau, Omo valley, and Gobi of Maji plateau to their present territory about 200 years ago. First they came to the Akobo (eastwards from the Blue Nile); then they moved in four directions, to the lower part of Kidhoa Bo of mewun to the Boma Mountain and the upper part from Gobi maji Plateau and the Omo valley of the Omo river to the mountain shologoy. These migrants also absorbed local groups. Since the late 1890s, the Suri were harassed by the Ethiopian imperial troops and northern settlers. As a result of this politico-economically driven harassment, numerous Suri went to the Boma Plateau in south Sudan, especially after 1925. In the 1980s the Suri people smuggled automatic weapons from Sudan.

The Suri are not the only ethnic group in the southwest of Ethiopia: there are around 12 more. Tensions exist between some of these groups. The Suri have one primary enemy, the Nyangatom people, a people south of them and member of the large Ateker population cluster. On a regular basis the Nyangatom and another enemy of the Suri, the Toposa (also of the Ateker group) team up to raid the Suri's cattle. The Second Sudanese Civil War has taken additional toll on the Suri. These conflicts have pushed neighboring groups into the Suri territory, creating a constant competition to defend what they have in terms of land, water sources and pasture. Clashes are most common during the dry season. Around this time the Suri move their cattle down south to find new grazing land. State authorities have been attempting to create awareness about conflict resolution and have occasionally called a "peace conference" (as in 2008). However, they have also confiscated large tracts of local groups' lands for commercial agrarian projects, worsening the situation. This has led to further conflict and dispute between minority ethnic groups and the Ethiopian government. The growing autonomy of the Southern Ethiopian Regional State after Ethiopia's internal troubles in the past years has also impacted Suri (cp. Wagstaff 2015) and related minorities, due to fierce ethnic competition and rivalry on the regional and local level.

=== Reports of displacement ===
According to tribal peoples advocacy groups (Survival International and Native Solutions to Conservation Refugees), local peoples, particularly the Suri, Nyangatom, Anywa and Mursi, are still in danger of displacement and denial of access to their traditional grazing and agricultural lands. More than a decade ago the main problem for Suri and Mursi was posed by the government bringing in the African Parks Foundation, also known as African Parks Conservation, of the Netherlands. These advocacy groups reported that the Surma/Suri, Me'en and Mursi people were coerced by government park officials into thumbprinting documents they could not read. The documents reportedly said the locals had agreed to give up their land without compensation, and were being used to legalise the boundaries of the Omo National Park, which African Parks then took over. This process, when finished, would have make the Suri, Mun, etc. "illegal squatters" on their own land. A similar fate almost befell the other groups who also lived within or near the park, e.g. the Dizi and the Nyangatom. The current threats to Suri and neighbouring groups' livelihoods are massive state-led ventures like construction of the Gilgel Gibe III Dam (completed in 2016) that eliminated river-bank cultivation and led to water scarcity, as well as the ongoing construction of huge mono-crop (sugar-cane) plantations in much of their pasture and cultivation areas. These seriously affect livelihoods, biodiversity, resources, and space, and do not lead to human development of the local peoples.

== Religion and beliefs ==
Around 97% of the Suri people are animists. The Suri have a sky god named Tumu (alternatively spelled Tuma). The Suri also believe in spirits and take recourse to (female) "diviners" as well. Another belief of the Suri is in rainmaking. This skill is passed down through heredity and is only given to one male in specific clans. When his services are needed, the men collect chips from a specific tree. These chips are then masticated and the remaining juice is then mixed with clay. This combination is poured and smeared over the man's body. After this process, rain is expected to fall.

In recent decades, Evangelical Christianity has gained a minor amount of followers, estimated to be 200-300. They're especially notable around the Kibish town and among those that left the area to study.

== Economy ==
The economy of the Suri is based on agriculture and livestock herding. They keep cattle and goats, the main source of wealth. Crops planted are sorghum, maize, cassava, cabbage, beans, yams, spice plants and some tobacco. During the dry season, the Suri also collect honey. The Suri pan gold in nearby streams which they sell for cash to highland traders. Suri women also use to make earthenware pots and sell them to neighbours, like the Dizi, and also sold produce of game hunting. These activities have sharply declined in the past decades. They now also produce local beer (gèso) for sale. The average married male in the Suri tribe owns somewhere between 30 and 40 cows. These cows are not killed unless needed for ceremonial purposes. Every young male has a "favourite cattle" name (next to others). Cows are very important to the Suri - economically, socially, symbolically - and at times they risk death to protect their herd. Suri men are also judged by how much cattle they own. Men are not able to marry until they have a sufficient number to start paying the bride-wealth to the bride's family. Cows are given to his prospective wife's family during and after the initial wedding ceremony. To praise their cattle or mourn their deaths, the Suri sing songs for them.

== Culture ==
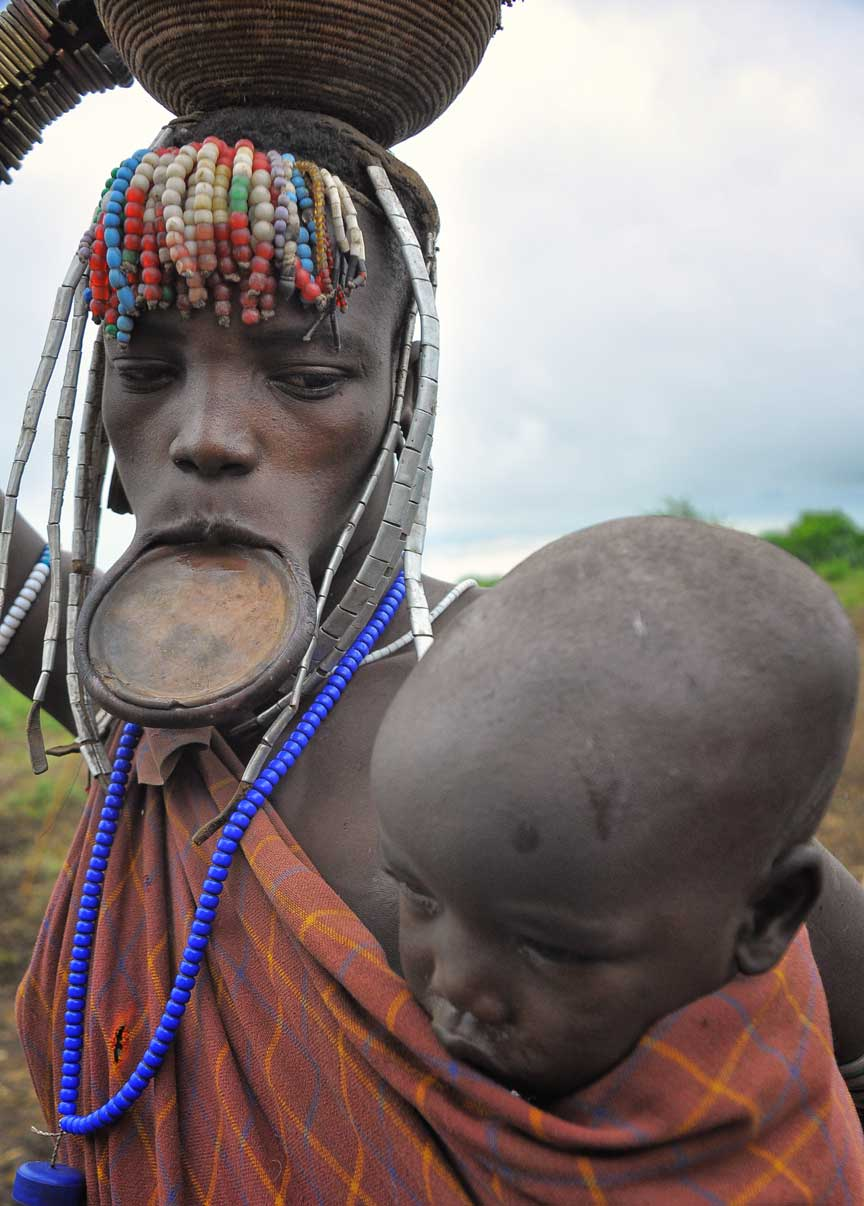
Surma woman with lip plug

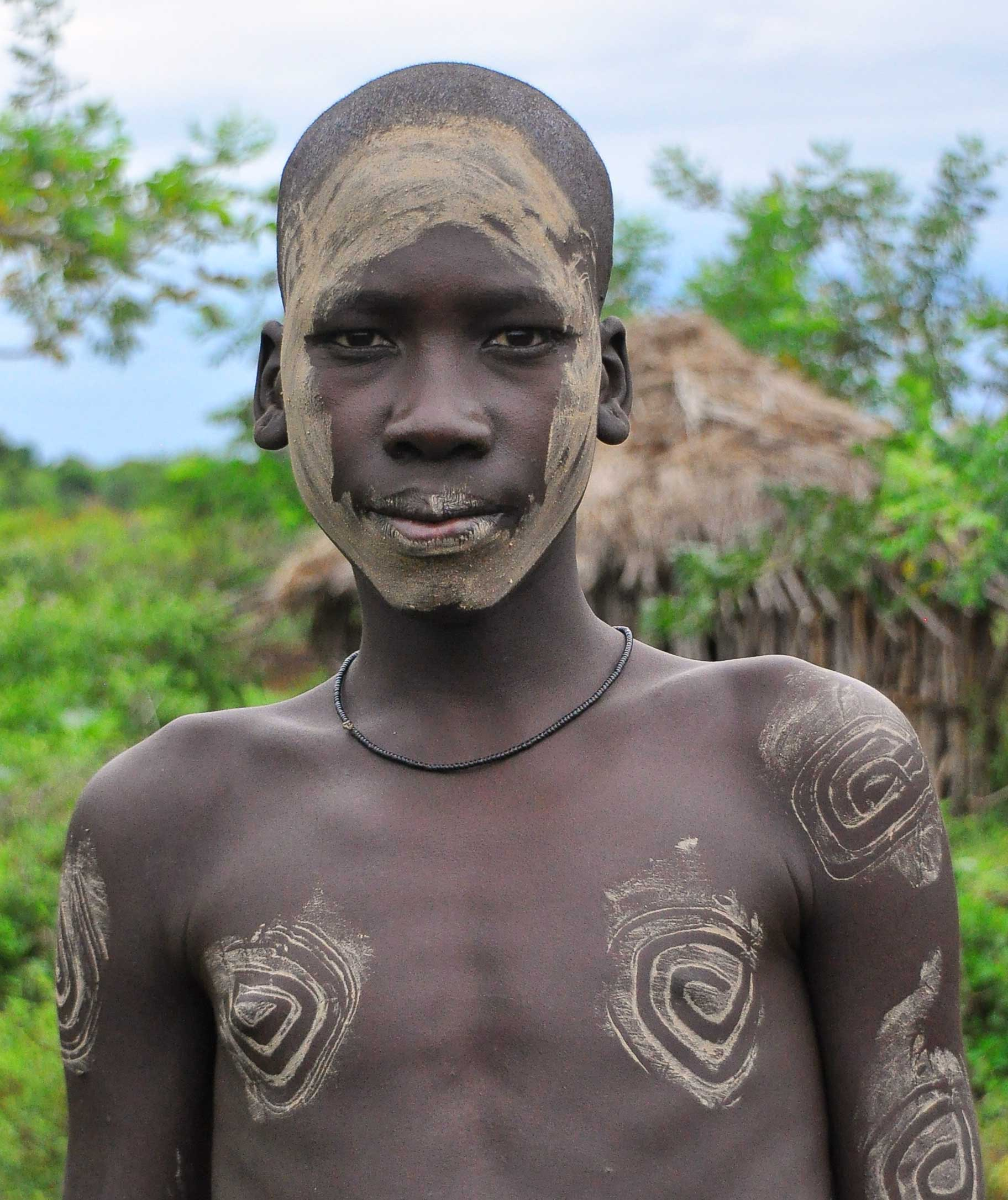
Surma man with body art

=== Body modification ===
The Suri practice body modification in the form of scarification and lip plate insertion among women.

Piercing lips and lobes and inserting lip plates are a strong part of the Suri culture. At puberty most young women have their lower teeth removed in order to get their lower lip pierced. Once the lip is pierced, it is then stretched and lip plates of increasing size are then placed in the hole of the piercing. Having a lip plate is a sign of female beauty and appropriateness; a common thought is that the bigger the plate, the more cattle the woman is "worth" for her bride price, though this is denied by some.

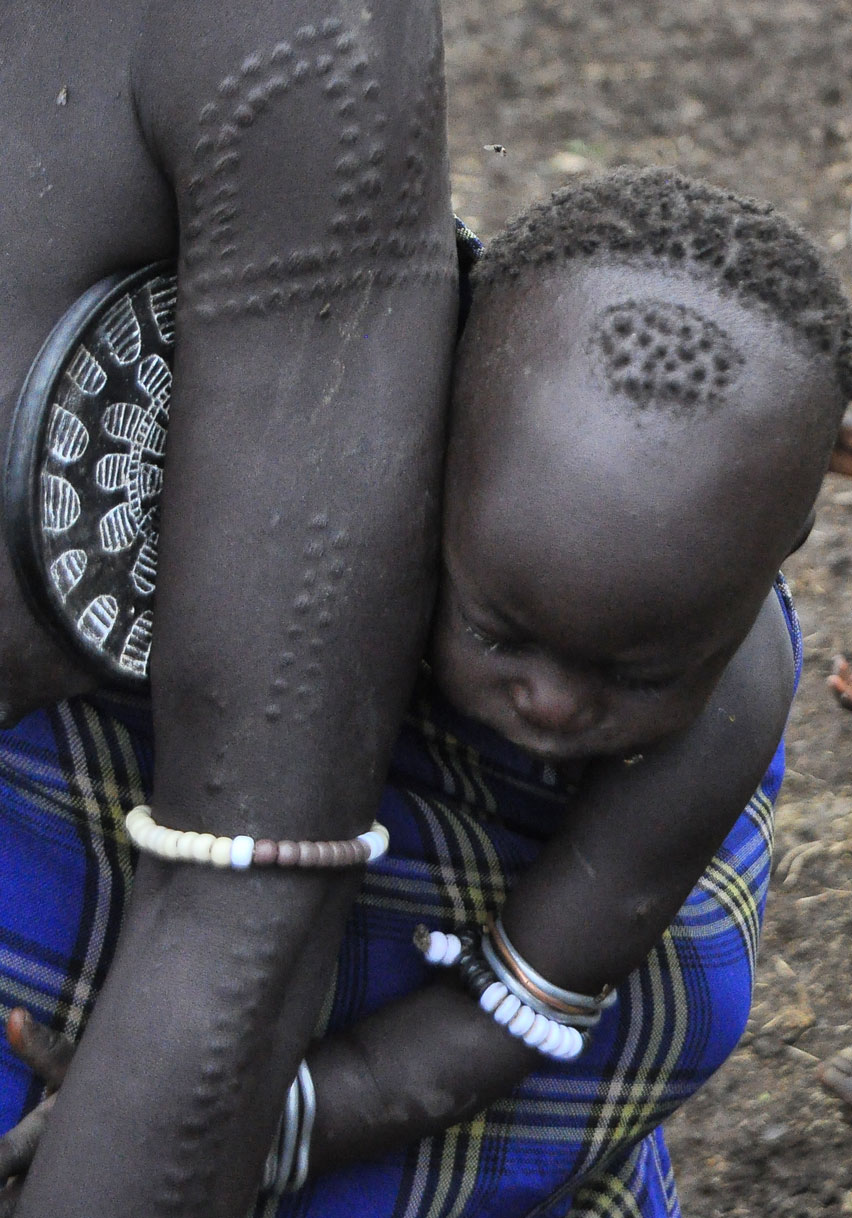
Surma person with arm scarification

The Suri pride themselves on their scars and how many they carry. Women perform decorative scarification by lifting the skin with a hook or edged thorn with the skin being then sliced or removed with a razor blade. After the skin is sliced the piece of skin left over is left to eventually scar. On the other hand, the men use to traditionally scar their bodies after they killed someone from an enemy group. Together with stick-duelling (see below), such a custom, which is quite painful, is said by some observers to be a way of getting the younger Suri accustomed to seeing blood and feeling pain.

=== Stick fighting ('Sagine') ===
A sport and ritual the Suri take very seriously is ceremonial duelling with sticks. In most cases, this is engaged in by young men to get respect from their families and community. The fights usually take place between two villages during harvest time, draw large audiences, and start with 20 to 30 representatives of each side, all of whom get a chance to duel against someone from the other side. During these fights there are referees present to make sure the rules are being followed.

It is not uncommon for stick fights to end within the first couple of hits, but at the same time deaths are not unheard of, especially from hits to the stomach. Shooting incidents have occasionally erupted between men who have other disputes in real life. Ethiopian law forbids stick fighting, but the tradition lives on.

=== Ways of life ===
Each household in the Suri village is mostly managed by a married woman. The women prepare the food, take care of the children, and cultivate their own fields and gardens. They are allowed to use their profits however they wish. There are also male age grades. Young men (Tegay) are not known as warriors, and are unmarried. They are mainly responsible for herding and defending the cattle. Junior elders (Rora) are the dominant decision-making age-grade and entrance is gained in an initiation ritual that is held every 20 to 30 years. During this initiation the young men to be "promoted" are tried and tested by elders, and are sometimes starved and whipped until they bleed. Decisions in the Suri community are made by men in an assembly. Women are not allowed to voice their opinions during these debates but are allowed to do so before or after the debates take place. These debates are closed and summed up by the community's ritual chief known as the 'komoru'.

=== Dress ===
During special occasions, Suri people wear brightly colored flowers on their heads and paint their faces and bodies. Due to the absence of mirrors, people paint each other. The paint is created by mixing leaves and flowers from various plants, crushed rock (white or red) and water.

== Sources and references ==
- Abbink, Jon (1996). The Suri. In: J. Middleton & A. Rassam, volume eds., Encyclopedia of World Cultures, vol. 9 (Africa/Middle East), pp. 323–327. Boston: G.K. Hall.
- Abbink, Jon (2009). The fate of the Suri: conflict and group tension the Southwest Ethiopian frontier. In: G. Schlee & E.E. Watson, eds, Changing Identifications and Alliances in Northeast Africa. Volume I: Ethiopia and Kenya, pp. 35–51. Oxford – New York: Berghahn Books.
- BBC/Discovery Channel TV-docu series Tribe (UK)/Going Tribal (US) shows British explorer Bruce Parry living among them a few weeks
- Abbink, Jon. (1998) "Ritual and political forms of violent practice among the Suri of southern Ethiopia", Cahiers d'études africaines, 38, cah. 150/152, pp. 271–295.
- African Parks Foundation
- bbc.co.uk
- gurtong.org
- Wagstaff, Q.A. (2015) "Development, Cultural Hegemonism and Conflict Generation in Southwest Ethiopia: Agro-Pastoralists in Trouble". Bordeaux: Les Afriques dans le Monde, Sciences Po Bordeaux (http://www.lam.sciencespobordeaux.fr/sites/lam/files/note13_observatoire.pdf)
- Woods, S. (30 October 2008) "Ethiopia's Nomad Warriors". Rolling Stone, Academic Search Premier database, Retrieved March 6, 2009.
