= Temein =

Temein may refer to:

- the Temein people
- the Temein language
