= Kwegu =

Kwegu may refer to:

- the Kwegu people
- the Kwegu language
