= Bale language =

Bale language may refer to:

- Akarbale language, of the Andaman Islands, India (ISO 639-3 acl)
- Baale language, of Ethiopia (ISO 639-3 koe)

== See also ==
- Lendu language, spoken by the Balendru in Democratic Republic of the Congo (ISO 639-3 led)
