= Suri language =

Surmic language of Ethiopia

Suri
- Surma
- Native to: Ethiopia
- Region: West Omo Zone
- Ethnicity: Suri, Tirma
- Native speakers: 27,000 (2007 census)
- Language family: Nilo-Saharan?: Eastern Sudanic?; Southern Eastern?; Surmic; South Surmic; Southeast Surmic; Pastoral Surmic; Tirma–Chai–Mursi; Suri
- Dialects: Tirma; Chai
- Writing system: Latin

Language codes
- ISO 639-3: suq
- Glottolog: suri1267
- ELP: Suri

Suri (Churi, Dhuri, Shuri, Shuro) is a Surmic language spoken in the West Omo Zone of the South West Ethiopia Peoples' Region in Ethiopia, to the South Sudan border. The language has been often referred to also by another form of its name, Surma, after which the Surmic branch of Eastern Sudanic is named, but that form is frequently used also for the related but distinct languages Mursi and Me'en.

Suri is spoken in two dialects by two nationalities, the Tirma (Tirmaga, Cirma, Dirma, Terema, Terna, Tid, Tirima, Tirmagi) and the Chai (Caci, Cai). It forms a dialect cluster with Mursi, with which it has over 80% lexical similarity. This linguistic classification is different from the ethnic identity, in which terms the Tirma and the Chai are the two main branches of the Suri people, but the third are the Baale, who speak the more distantly related Baale language (though likewise Surmic).

== Phonology ==
=== Consonants ===
		Labial	Alveolar	Palatal	Velar	Glottal
Stop	voiceless		t	c	k	(ʔ)
Stop	voiced	b	d	ɟ	g	
Stop	implosive	ɓ	ɗ	ʄ	ɠ	
Fricative	voiceless		s	ʃ		h
Fricative	voiced		z			
Nasal		m	n	ɲ	ŋ	
Flap/Trill			ɾ ~ r			
Lateral			l			
Approximant		w		j		

- /ɗ/ may also be heard as a retroflex implosive [ᶑ] among the Chai dialect.
- /ʃ/ variant of [c] among speakers in the Tirmaga dialect. In the Chai dialect, it is heard as a separate phoneme.
- /ɾ/ can be heard as a trill [r] in word-final positions.
- /b, ɡ/ can be heard as [β, ɣ] in intervocalic positions.
- Implosives /ɓ, ɗ/ are heard as plosive sounds [p, t] in pre-consonantal and word-final positions.
- Sounds /b, ɟ, ɡ/ are devoiced as [p, c, k] pre-consonantal word-final.
- Some speakers of the Chai dialect may pronounce /s, z/ as dental fricatives [θ, ð].
- /j/ can be heard as a fricative [ð] among older speakers in different positions.
- A glottal stop [ʔ] may be heard in word-final position in connected speech.

=== Vowels ===
	Front	Central	Back
Close	i		u
Close-mid	e		o
Open-mid	ɛ		ɔ
Open		a	

- /i, u/ can be heard as [ɪ, ʊ] in closed syllables.

== Bibliography ==
- Bryant, Mike and Bargola Olekibo, compilers. 1997. Surichen ko aranjacan ko golacan (Suri–English–Amharic dictionary). 2nd ed. S.l.: Surma Translation Project. 65 p.
- Bryant, Michael G. (1999). Aspects of Tirmaga Grammar (MA thesis). University of Texas, Arlington.
- Last, Marco; Lucassen, Deborah (1998). "A Grammatical Sketch on Chai, a Southeastern Surmic Language". In Dimmendaal, Gerrit; Last, Marco (eds.). Surmic Languages and Cultures. Köln: Rüdiger Köppe Verlag. pp. 375–436.
- Unseth, Peter. 1997. "Disentangling the Two Languages Called 'Suri'". Occasional Papers in the Study of Sudanese Languages 7: 49-69.
- Last, Marco and Deborah Lucassen. 1998. "Violence and Political Discourse Among the Chai Suri". in: Dimmendaal, Gerrit and Marco Last (eds.) Surmic Languages and Cultures. Rüdiger Köppe Verlag, Köln. pp. 323.
