= Kichepo people =

The Kichepo are a Surmic ethnic group of Greater Pibor Administrative Area, South Sudan and the Southern Nations, Nationalities, and People's Region of Ethiopia. They speak Kichepo, a dialect of Kacipo-Balesi, which is part of the Surmic language family. The population of this group is above 10,000.
