= Keiga Jirru language =

Eastern Sudanic language of Sudan

Keiga Jirru
- Đóni
- Native to: Sudan
- Region: Nuba Hills
- Native speakers: (1,400 with Tese cited 1971)
- Language family: Nilo-Saharan?: Eastern Sudanic?; Southern Eastern?; Temein; Keiga Jirru

Language codes
- ISO 639-3: (covered by keg Tese)
- Glottolog: keig1243

Keiga Jirru is an Eastern Sudanic language spoken in the Nuba Hills of Sudan.

There is no listing in Ethnologue, as it was considered a dialect of the Tese language.
