= Murle people =

Ethnic group

Regions with significant populations
- South Sudan, southwestern Ethiopia

Languages
- Murle language

Religion
- Animism, Christianity

Related ethnic groups
- Other Surmic peoples

The Murle are a Surmic ethnic group inhabiting the Pibor County and Boma area in Greater Pibor Administrative Area, South Sudan, as well as parts of southwestern Ethiopia. They have also been referred as Beir by the Dinka and as Jebe by the Luo and Nuer, among others. The Murle speak the Murle language, which is part of the Surmic language family. The language cluster includes some adjoining groups in Sudan, as well as some non-contiguous Surmic populations in southwestern Ethiopia.

== History ==
Murle oral traditions, as recorded by Bazzet Lewis—a British colonial officer who served as District Commissioner among the Murle from 1941 to 1944—offer a detailed account of the community’s origins. In his 1972 ethnographic study, Lewis highlights the significance of Jen, a mythical place located beyond Maji, located on the Boma plateau. In Murle cosmology, Jen is venerated as the sacred point of origin, symbolizing the East—the source of life, rainfall, and ancestral memory.

According to Lewis, Murle songs and myths evoke Jen as a mythical Eden. One traditional verse declares:

O Jen! It was at Jen that our ancestors came down to earth.
They captured the black cattle.
Crumble the tobacco, for at Jen the tobacco was sweet like cattle.

Lewis also records one of the Murle’s creation myths, in which women descended alone from the heavens to Jen. One woman, upon cutting grass, encountered a spirit hiding among the blades. She captured the spirit and kept it in her hut, where it later impregnated her. Her mysterious pregnancy gave rise to suspicion and ultimately tragedy, but a second woman later gave birth to Murimaan, a boy who grew up to become the founding ancestor of the Murle. This birth, facilitated by the intervention of Rat, led to the rat’s enduring ceremonial association with Murle funerary rites, particularly the deaths of Kelenya chiefs and their senior wives.

A different version of the myth - preserved in a song, still performed then - recalled the events of creation in striking and earthy language. The story connected to the song centers on the first union between spirit and woman, occurring without the exchange of bridewealth, a point the Murle themselves later reconcile with the belief that human beings were created by God in the sky. According to this account, a celestial woman named Abei, regarded as the grandmother of all mankind, gave birth to Murimaan, the progenitor of Murle chiefs. Some narratives attribute Murimaan’s conception to Jok (a Nilotic term), the great spirit, while others credit Tammu, a term that simultaneously denotes God, rain, and the sky.

Although Jok and Tammu are sometimes described as distinct, Murle speakers often use them interchangeably. Lewis noted that while Jok was explicitly masculine and said to reside in heaven (tammu), Tammu was more frequently invoked in general discourse. Murle philosophy, he observed, seemed to frame the origin of humanity through analogy with childbirth: Jok represented the animating male spirit, while Tammu provided the womb of creation, resulting in Murimaan’s birth.

Other mythic episodes—such as those involving Manidherbo, the Pleiades, or the Etiwur stories about the discovery of animals—are more fragmented in collective memory and contain internal contradictions, suggesting they hold lesser importance in contemporary Murle thought.

Following their mythical emergence at Jen, Murle oral tradition—as recorded by Lewis—describes a gradual migration southward along the Omo River to Lake Rudolf (now Lake Turkana). A Murle village is still remembered on the Omo, believed to have been the home of the Ngandarec, a lineage known to present-day Lotilla Murle. From there, the Murle moved through Kolobaadh in Taposa territory, climbed Mount Kathiangor (referred to as Kather), and entered the Maruwa Hills, with some groups continuing as far as Boma.

During this period, a significant division occurred between the Longarim, who now inhabit the Boya Hills, and the rest of the tribe. Lewis suggests that the Longarim were once a junior drumship within the Ngarotti section of the Murle, as evidenced by the presence of clans still recognized as Longarim within Lotilla territory. These claims indicate enduring affiliations despite later spatial and political separations.

The causes of these migrations are unclear, but Lewis notes that Murle narratives often refer to conflict with the Kum—a collective term used for the Taposa, Jiye, and Turkana (see Ateker peoples). Longstanding rivalry with these groups may have contributed to the Murle’s gradual movement northward and westward, ultimately leading to their settlement in the Lotilla Valley. This migration was likely accelerated by ecological decline around Lake Turkana, where diminishing pasture and water sources made continued habitation unsustainable.

== Culture ==
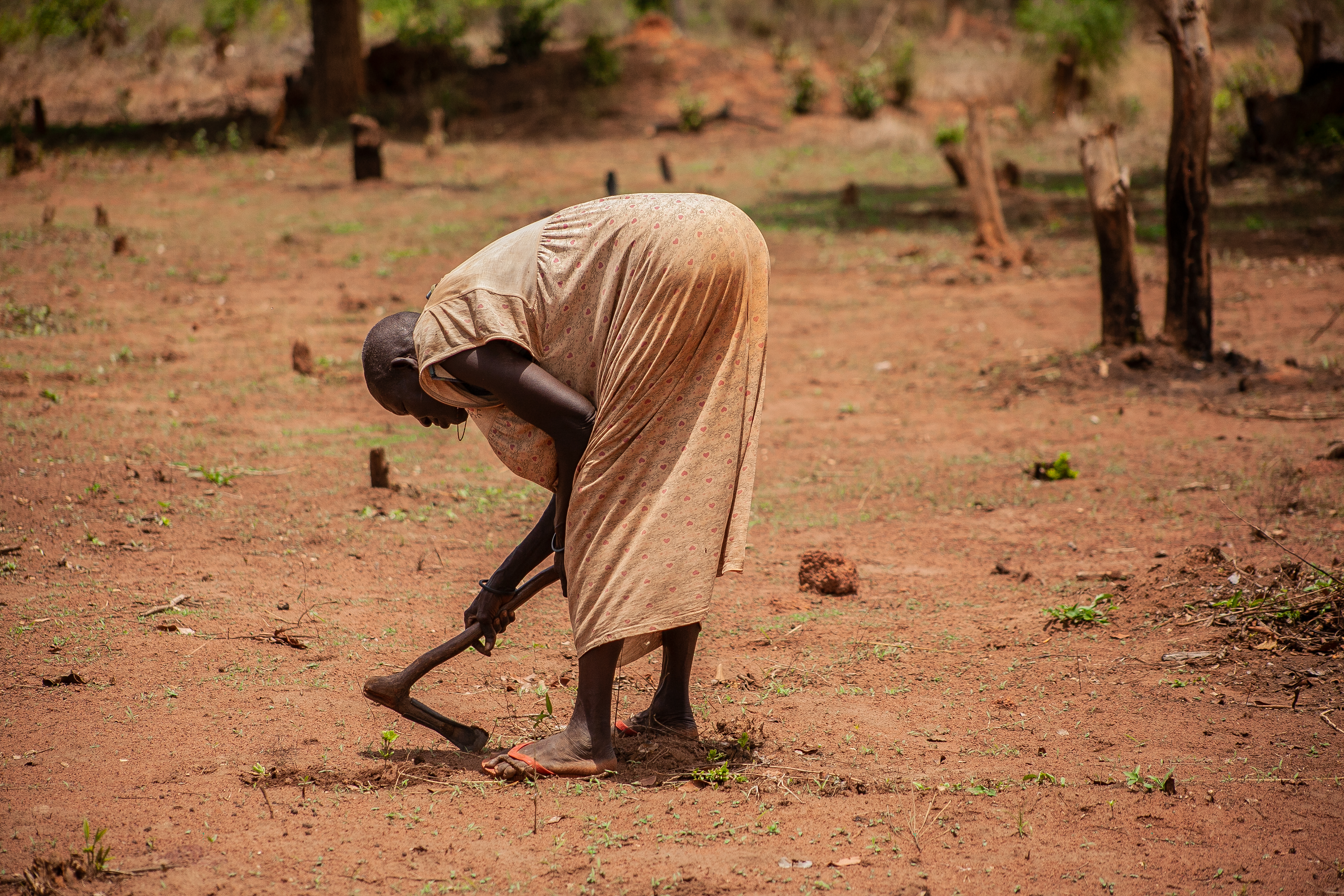
A Murle woman trying to clear land for agriculture

Murle in most cases practice a blend of animism and Christianity. Elders and witches often function as trouble fixers. But they are pastoralists in a country where localized and unpredictable shortages occur in rain, drinking water, bush fruits and cattle grass. This necessitates a partly nomadic lifestyle over large distances. As a result, in times of shortages they have frequently come into conflict with numerically larger groups, including the Dinka and Nuer.

The Murle (like the Dinka and Nuer) have a tradition in which men can only marry when they pay a bride wealth of several dozens of cows. Education and jobs are almost absent and there are very few possibilities to earn money by producing for domestic or foreign markets. As a result, the only way to acquire cows for marriage, quicker than through breeding them, is by stealing.

The Murle have a historical tradition of migrating over the years in a clockwise direction around Lake Turkana (Arensen 1983). In the 1930s, they negotiated small pockets of 'homeland' in Pibor, where they are always allowed to graze their cattle and grow crops, even when in conflict with neighbors. This homeland is far too small for their survival, so they have a common interest in maintaining peace with Dinka and Nuer so that they can graze their cattle over wider areas. But the small size of their homeland and the near absence of police protection make them very vulnerable when conflicts do occur. When doubts arise that there will be peace and sufficient water and grazing rights, survival instincts align with 'bride hunger', sometimes driving the young men into risky cattle rustling adventures against their larger neighbors.

In the north-south war since, the Murle were mainly underrepresented and neglected by the SPLA. They sought protection by forming an armed group to protect themselves from the former rebel SPLA and the Northern Sudanese Militias.

== Ethnic violence ==
In most South-Sudanese cattle cultures, the bride-wealth system, and illegal taxing by some unscrupulous local leaders stimulates young men to find excuses to steal cows from their own cousins. Local leaders then sometimes try to quell or prevent intra-tribal fighting, by directing that aggression outwards, to other tribes. Also, Murle are feared and seen by surrounding larger tribes as having strong magical powers, and therefore they are often blamed for outbreaks of diseases, theft and arson.

With the country still awash with machine guns from the Second Sudanese Civil War, 'cattle rustling' quickly runs out of control, killing dozens or hundreds of people in retaliatory escalations. Many Nuer reason that Murle are the grand children of immigrants with much less rights to use land and graze cattle. So Murle cattle, argue some Nuer, were raised on stolen grass, therefore most of their cattle actually belong to the Nuer. Many Murle elders argue that often if the Dinka and Nuer are facing hunger or drought, they sell their children to the Murle in exchange for cattle, then later report to the authorities that their children have been kidnapped by the Murle.

In December 2011, about 6,000 Nuer Youths Army marched on the remote town of Pibor in Jonglei state, home to the rival Murle people, burning homes and looting facilities after overtaking a small South Sudan Army unit. The Lou-Nuer blame the Murle for cattle raiding and have vowed to wipe out the entire Murle Tribe on the face of the Earth. An estimated 3,000 people were killed, mainly children, women and the elderly. More than 1,000 people were killed in ethnic clashes within South Sudan in 2012, with Jonglei being one of the states most affected by the violence. Thousands more civilians have been displaced from their homes.

Along South Sudan's border with Ethiopia, a rebellion is smouldering among the Murle, with civilians caught in the conflict. Civilians alleging torture by the Sudan People's Liberation Army (SPLA) claim fingernails being torn out, burning plastic bags dripped on children to make their parents hand over weapons and the villages of Laor and the Tanyang people burned alive in their huts because rebels were suspected of spending the night in the village.

On August 18, 2011, to retaliate and retrieve cattle stolen from the previous conflict, several young Murle sacked and burned the air strip village of Pierri and a dozen surrounding hamlets, killing over a hundred people, abducting dozens or hundreds of children and stealing up to tens of thousands of cattle. One explanation might also be the drought: Pierri has one of the very few functioning dry season drinking water wells, often with thousands of people queuing for its water. Nuer have often excluded Murle from using this water.

Because of the Dinka and Nuer domination in the South Sudan government and as well as in the state level, most problems are blamed on Murle; therefore it is difficult for journalists and researchers to check any claims against the Murle.

Some conflicts could be prevented by sinking more wells. Also, a national conference on drinking water, land use rights and land redistribution, might help, if Murle survival needs and all their arguments are taken seriously.

State intervention in bride wealth culture (moving it away from virtual slave trade to an exchange of intentions and nominal tokens) and strong state action against illegal taxation by local leaders in Nuer, Dinka and Murle society is also needed.

Also, South Sudan, with its enormous agricultural potential during the rainy season, needs to be connected to regional and world markets, so that through agriculture and cattle breeding, the economy can be based on something else than tit for tat theft.
