= Mursi people =

Surmic ethnic group in southwestern Ethiopia

Mursi
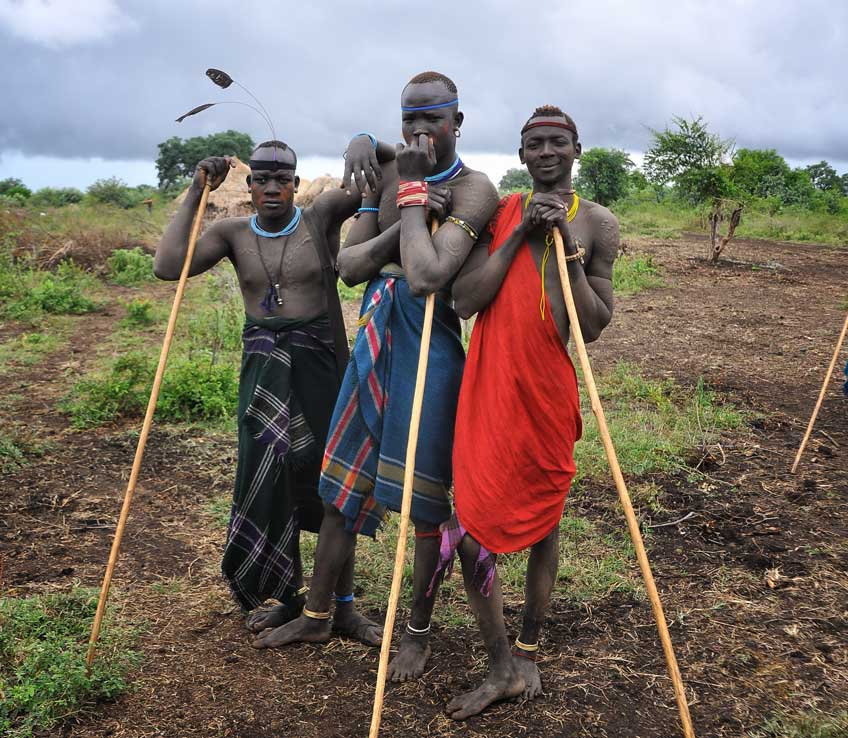
- Mursi men

Total population
- 11,500 (2007)

Regions with significant populations
- Southwestern Ethiopia (Debub Omo Zone)

Languages
- Mursi language

Religion
- Animism; Christianity

Related ethnic groups
- Me'en, Suri, Kwegu

The Mursi (or Mun as they refer to themselves) are a Surmic ethnic group in Ethiopia. They mostly reside in the Debub Omo Zone of the South Ethiopia Regional State, near the border with South Sudan. According to the 2007 national census, there are 11,500 Mursi, 848 of whom live in urban areas; of the total number, 92.25% live in the South Ethiopia Regional State.

Map of Ethiopia with Numbered Zones: South Ethiopia Regional State is no. 9

Surrounded by mountains between the Omo River and its tributary the Mago, the home of the Mursi is one of the most isolated regions of the country. Their neighbors include the Aari, the Banna, the Mekan, the Karo, the Kwegu, the Nyangatom and the Suri. They are grouped together with the Me'en and Kwegu by the Ethiopian government under the name Surma.

== Language ==
The Mursi speak the Mursi language as a mother tongue. It is a part of the Surmic language family.

== Religion and culture ==
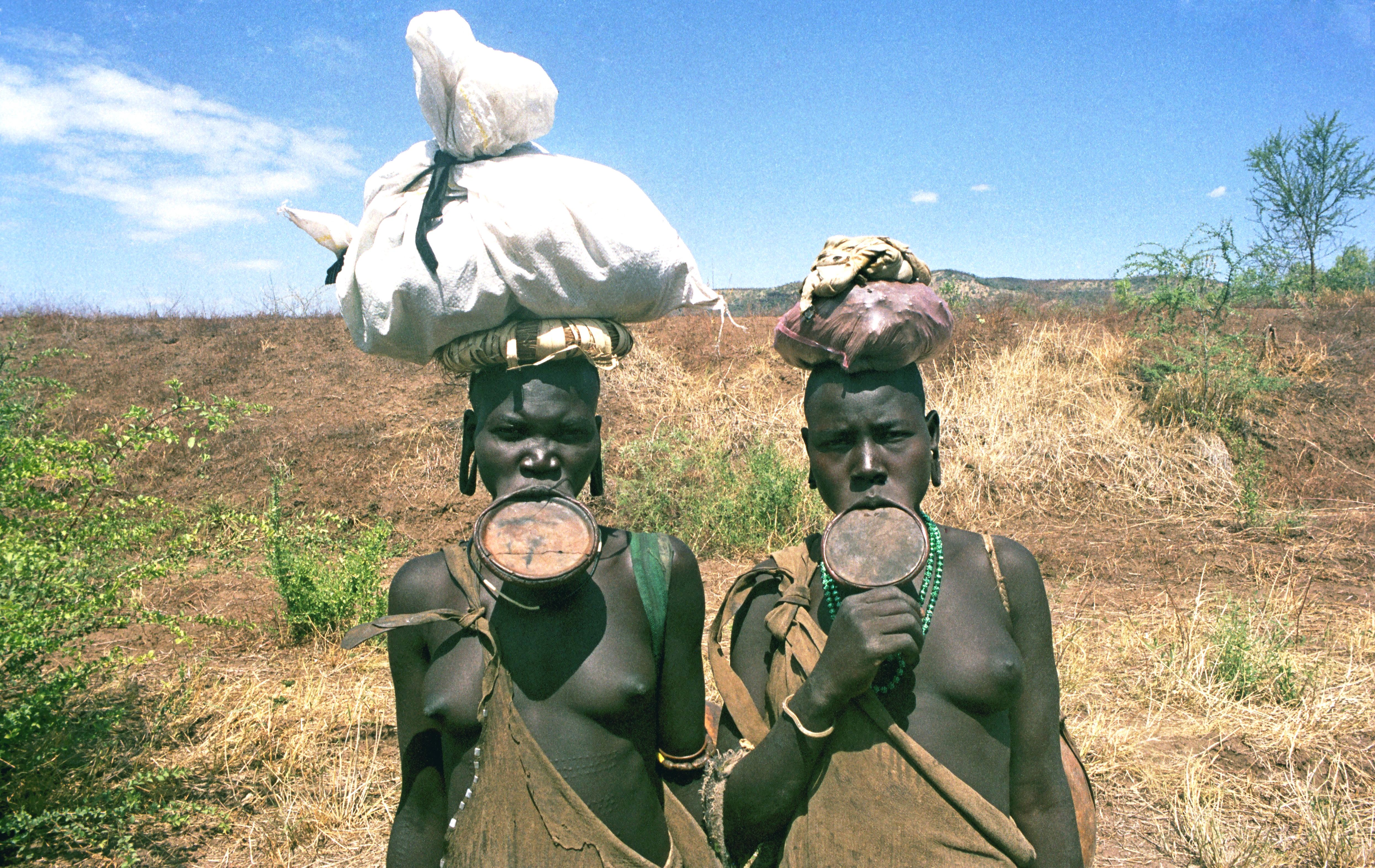
Young Mursi women in Mago National Park

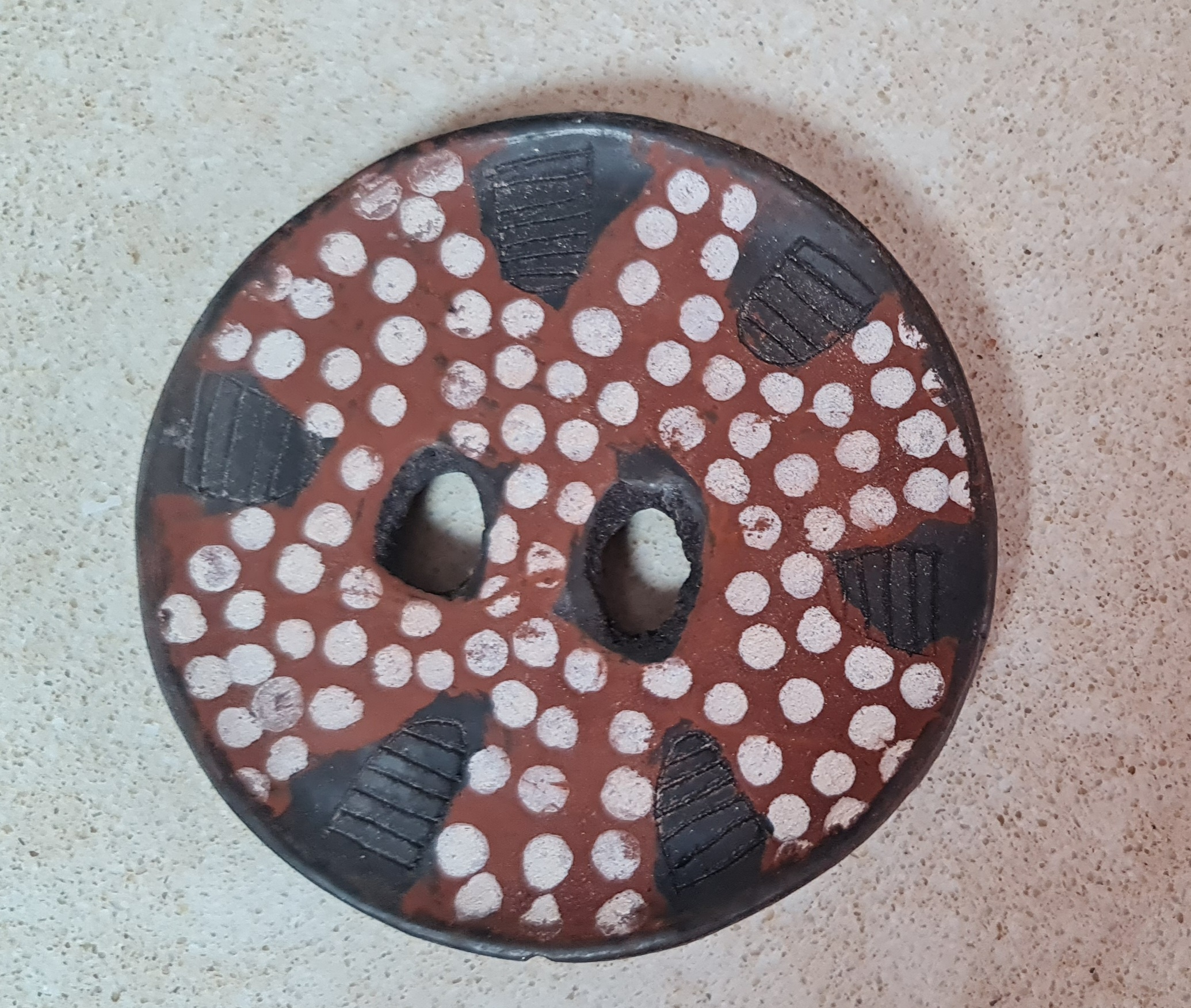
Mouthpiece plate from the Mursi Tribe

Like many agro-pastoralists in East Africa, the Mursi believe that they experience a force greater than themselves, which they call Tumwi. This is usually located in the Sky, although sometimes Tumwi manifests itself as a thing of the sky (ahi a tumwin), such as a rainbow or a bird. The principal religious and ritual office in the society is that of the Kômoru, the Priest or Shaman. This is an inherited office, unlike the more informal political role of the Jalaba. The Kômoru embodies in his person the well-being of the group as a whole and acts as a means of communication between the community and the god (Tumwi), especially when it is threatened by such events as drought, crop pests and disease. His role is characterized by the performance of public rituals to bring rain, to protect men, cattle and crops from disease, and to ward off threatened attacks from other tribes. Ideally, in order to preserve this link between the people and the Tumwi, the Kômoru should not leave Mursiland or even his local group (bhuran). One clan in particular, Komortê, is considered to be, par excellence, the priestly clan, but there are priestly families in two other clans, namely Garikuli and Bumai.

The religion of the Mursi people is classified as animism, although some Mursi have adopted Christianity. There is a Serving in Mission Station in the northeastern corner of Mursiland, which provides education, basic medical care and instruction in Christianity.

Body painting is a cultural significance within the Mursi Tribe, and it's signified to be a blessing and protection from negative entities or outcomes. The body paint can either be made with ash or stone mixed with water.

== Life cycles ==
The Mursi undergo various rites of passage, educational or disciplinary processes. Lip plates are a well known aspect of the Mursi and Surma, who are probably the last groups in Africa amongst whom it is still the norm for women to wear large pottery, wooden discs, or 'plates', in their lower lips. Girls' lips are pierced at the age of 15 or 16, or when they start to undergo puberty. The piercing starts off with a small piece of wood, and the piercing gradually gets larger over time. Occasionally, lip plates are worn to a dance by unmarried women, and increasingly they are worn to attract tourists in order to earn some extra money. Lip plates are known as dhebi a tugoin.

Mursi men also go through rites of passage through "age grades." Mursi men are first assigned to two age grade groups during the first years of their life until their mid-teens: changalay and dhongai. Mursi men then switch their age grade to teru when transitioning into adulthood. One tradition Mursi men prepare for is stick fighting in the teru age grade.

== Omo National Park ==
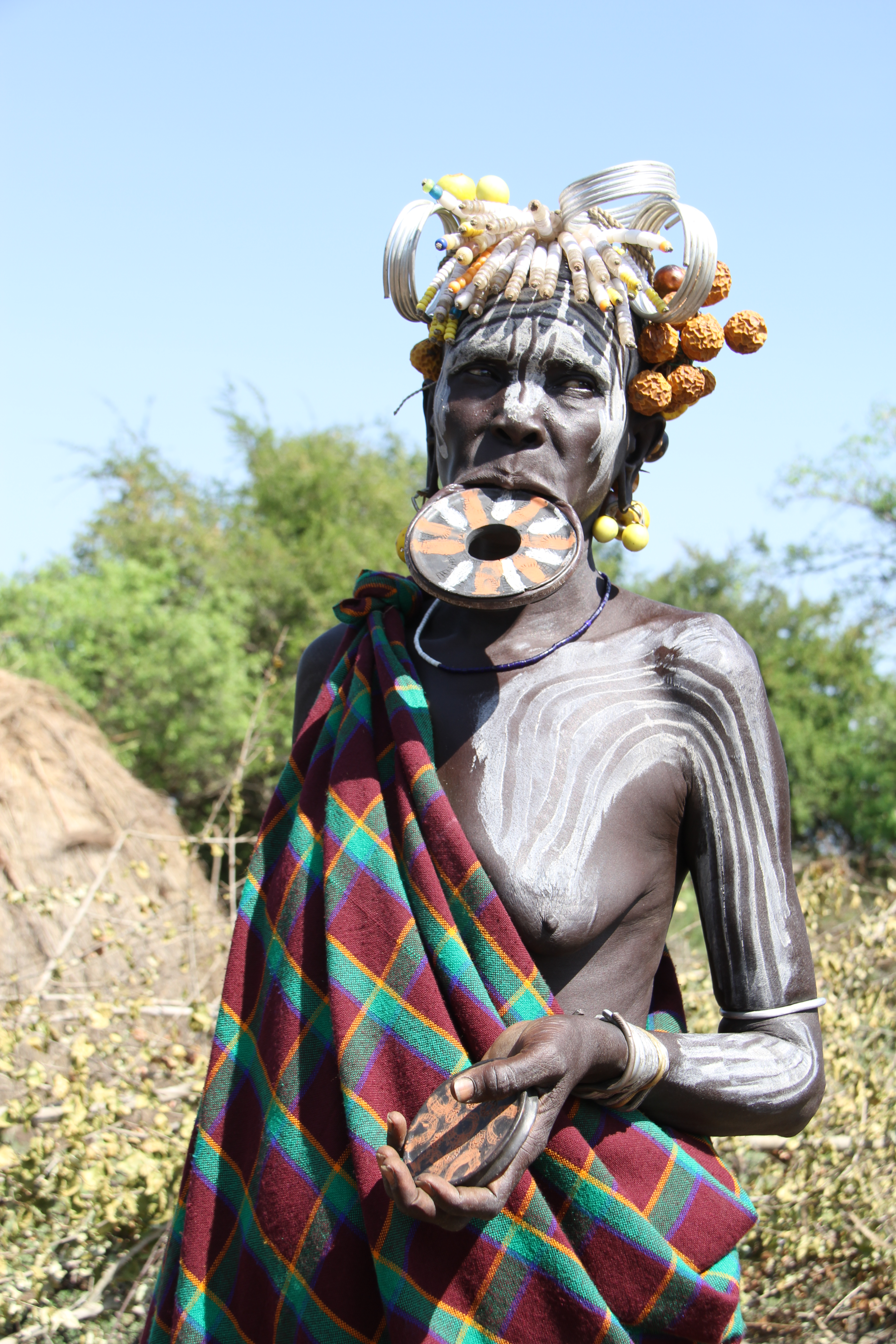
Mursi woman

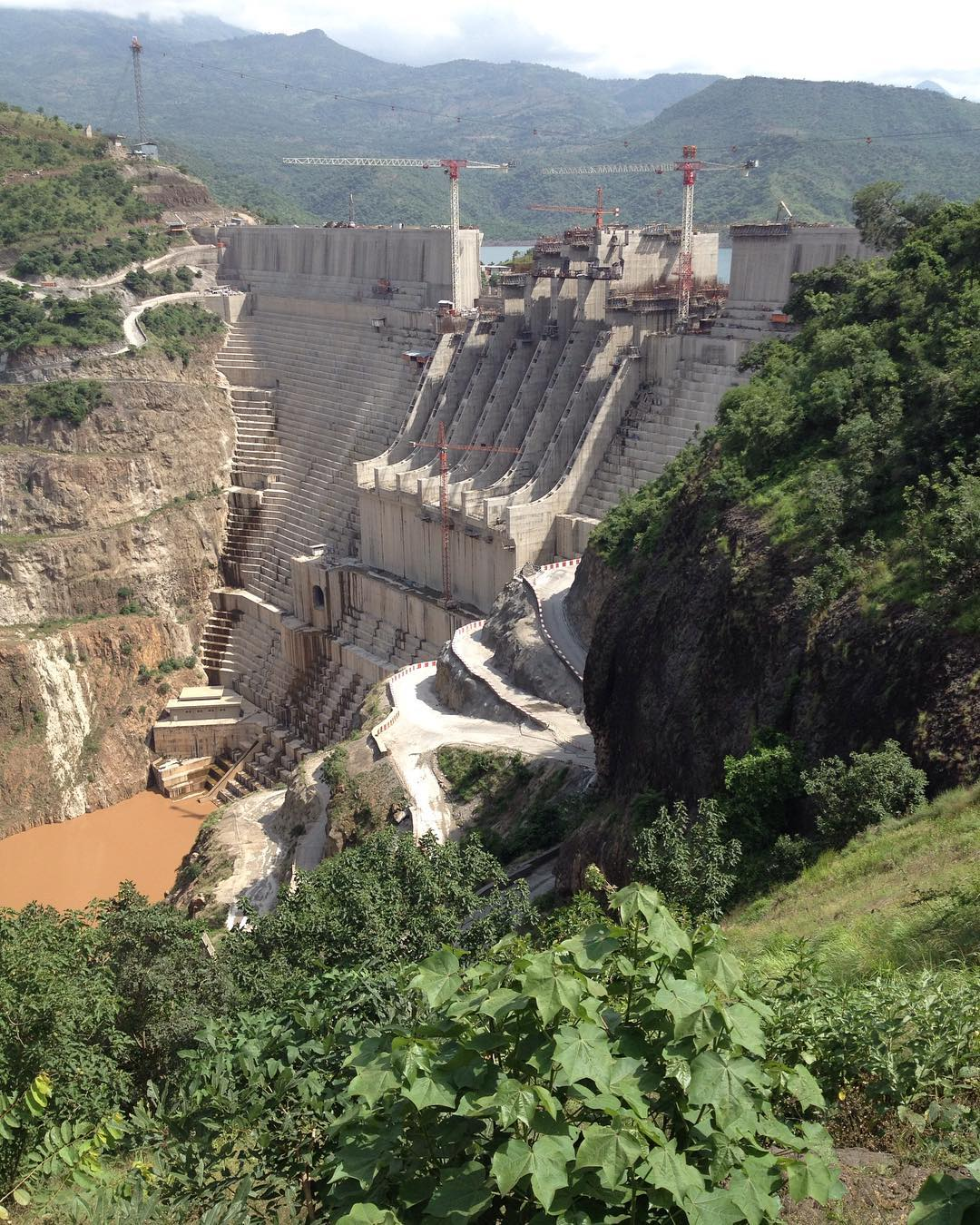
Gibe III Dam

The African Parks Foundation and government park officials are accused of coercing Mursi into giving up their land within the boundaries of the Omo National Park without compensation. The documents are being used to legalize the boundaries of the park, which African Parks has taken over.

A group called "Native Solutions to Conservation Refugees" says that the documents will make the Mursi 'illegal squatters' on their own land and that a similar fate is befalling the Suri, Dizi, Me'en, and Nyangatom, who also live within the park. After the African Parks Foundation took over Omo National Park, the Mursi feared that they would eventually be evicted from their land like the Guji-Oromo in Nechasar National Park. Due to mounting pressures from human rights activists, African Parks Foundation announced its plans to leave Omo National Park in 2007. The Mursi have declared their territory a community conservation area as of July 2008 and have begun a community tourism project.

== Gibe III Dam ==
The Gibe III hydroelectric dam, in the middle Basin of the Omo and completed in October 2015, will greatly modify the flood regime upon which thousands of people in the lower basin depend for their livelihoods. By regulating the river flows, and 'uplifting' the low flows during the dry season, it will also make possible the development of large-scale commercial irrigation schemes, although the latest report commissioned suggests that there is not enough water in the Omo River to irrigate the proposed area of plantations. The most ambitious of these is already being implemented by the state-run Ethiopian Sugar Corporation on land either taken from the Omo National Park or currently occupied by the Bodi, Mursi, Nyangatom and Kara. If current plans are realised the lower Omo will become by far the largest irrigation complex in Ethiopia, at least doubling the total irrigated area in the country.

== Framing the Other (2012) ==
A documentary directed by Ilja Kok and Willem Timmers, Framing the Other presents the culture of the Mursi people, specifically the practice of Mursi women wearing lip plates and tourism popularity. The film captures the exchanged interactions between a Western tourist from Holland and a Mursi woman from Ethiopia, and personal interviews of how they perceived one another. Framing the Other not only shares the background of Mursi people, but also shares the effects of tourism.
