= Tese language =

Eastern Sudanic language

Tese
- Keiga Jirru
- T̪ɛséʔ
- Native to: Sudan
- Region: Nuba Hills
- Native speakers: (1,400 with Keiga Jirru, cited 1971)
- Language family: Nilo-Saharan?: Eastern Sudanic?; Southern Eastern?; Temein; Tese

Language codes
- ISO 639-3: keg (shared with Keiga Jirru)
- Glottolog: tese1238
- ELP: Tese
- Tese is classified as Critically Endangered by the UNESCO Atlas of the World's Languages in Danger.

Tese (Teisei) is an Eastern Sudanic language spoken in the Nuba Hills of Sudan.

Ethnologue lists Keiga Jirru as an alternate name.
