= Tennet language =

Eastern Sudanic language spoken by the Tennet people of South Sudan

Tennet
- Native to: South Sudan
- Region: Eastern Equatoria, Lafon County
- Ethnicity: Tennet
- Native speakers: 30,000 (2009)
- Language family: Nilo-Saharan?: Eastern Sudanic?; Southern Eastern?; Surmic; South; Southwest; Didinga–Murle; Tennet

Language codes
- ISO 639-3: tex
- Glottolog: tenn1246
- ELP: Tennet

Tennet is a Surmic language spoken by the Tennet people in South Sudan. The Tennet home area is a group of fifteen (15) villages at the northern part of Eastern Equatoria state, 65 kilometers northeast of Torit.

== Distribution ==
Tennet is spoken in fourteen villages, these villages are Imilwanit, Ngaalovi, Itir, Nyaaro, Leteji Ngaanlobok, Loudum, Le̱le̱, Lovi, Tare, Lobele, Imedu, Momoi and Lovirang. The major town for Tennet is Arilo, of Lafon County, Eastern Equatoria State (Ethnologue).

== Phonology ==
=== Consonants ===
Tennet Consonants
		Labial		Dental		Alveolar		Postalveolar/ Retroflex		Velar	
		Len	For	Len	For	Len	For	Len	For	Len	For
Stop	voiceless	p	pː			t	tː	ʈ		k	kː
Stop	voiced	ɓ	bː	d̪		ɗ	dː			ɠ	ɡː
Fricative/ Affricate	voiceless							tʃ	tːʃ		
Fricative/ Affricate	voiced	v	vː	ð	ðː			dʒ	dːʒ	ɣ	
Nasal		m	mː			n	nː	ɲ		ŋ	ŋː
Flap/Trill						r	rː				
Approximant		w	wː			l	lː	j	jː		

Most consonants are members of a fortis/lenis pair, and that fortis may be realized phonetically in several ways: lengthening, change from ingressive to egressive, trilling, devoicing, and fricative hardening (becoming a stop). The fortis counterpart of the voiced velar fricative [ɣ] has been omitted. In Randal (1995), the consonant chart includes it to show the consonants in the Tennet orthography. The fortis counterpart of [ɣ] is omitted here because it is phonetically identical to the fortis counterpart of [k].

=== Vowels ===
Tennet has five [+ATR] vowels and five corresponding [-ATR] vowels. The vowels are /i/, /e/, /a/, /o/, /u/, and in the current orthography, [+ATR] vowels are marked with an underline. Tongue height may vary slightly without affecting the [ATR] quality of a vowel, so unlike certain West African languages (e.g. Akan and Igbo), the [+ATR] /e/, for example, may actually be slightly lower than the [-ATR] /e/. The [+ATR] feature spreads from right to left, so a [+ATR] suffix will cause the vowels in a [-ATR] stem to become [+ATR]. Tennet uses [ATR] to mark lexical and grammatical distinctions.

Any of the ten vowels may be lengthened. In the orthography, vowels are doubled to show length.

Tennet has two level tones and a falling tone. A rising tone is treated as a low-high sequence, because it occurs only on long vowels. In the current orthography the high tone is marked with an acute accent, falling is marked with a circumflex, and low is unmarked. Tone often marks grammatical relations and occasionally marks lexical distinctions.

== Morphology ==
Like its closer Surmic relatives, Tennet uses multiple strategies to mark number on nouns.

- Singular suffix: Nouns that refer to things that usually occur in groups (e.g. teeth, leaves)
- Plural suffix: Nouns referring to things that usually occur singly (e.g. turtle, carotid artery)
- Singular suffix to mark singular and plural suffix to mark plural (e.g. pipe, waterbuck)
- Tone change
- Stem change (rare)

The number marking system is quite similar to that of Murle, for which Arensen has proposed semantically based categories to group nouns that use the same strategy for marking number.

Tennet has a marked nominative system, where a noun takes a suffix when it is the subject of either a transitive or intransitive verb. A noun serving as a direct object is unmarked, and so are citation forms.

In an equational clause with an implicit "be" verb, both nouns are left unmarked (the accusative form).

Like other Surmic languages, Tennet uses a modified vigesimal counting system. "Six" is derived from "five and one," "seven" from "five and two," etc. "Ten" is a new word, followed by "ten and one," "ten and two," up to "ten and five and four," after which is a new word for "twenty," which means "a person" (10 fingers and 10 toes). "Forty" is "two people," sixty is "three people," etc.

== Syntax and Typology ==
Tennet has a basic VSO word order. As is the case with other Surmic languages, Tennet's word order for interrogative clauses is typologically surprising. Greenberg's Universal 12 predicts that for VSO languages, interrogative words will be sentence-initial, but Tennet and its relatives have sentence-final interrogative words.

The language has a category of words that have been analyzed as postpositions. If that is what they are, Tennet syntax contains another typological anomaly, since Greenberg's Universal 9 predicts prepositions for VSO languages. However, these postposition candidates also have some noun-like characteristics (case marking), and certain constructions containing indisputable nouns parallel the apparent postpositional constructions quite nicely.

== Bibliography ==
- Amargira, Adelino. 2006. "Derivational Forms and the Nature of Modifiers in Tennet," in Al-Amin Abu-Manga, Leoma Gilley, and Anne Storch (eds.), Insights into Nilo-Saharan Language, History and Culture: Proceedings of the 9th Nilo-Saharan Linguistics Colloquium, Institute of African and Asian Studies, University of Khartoum, 16–19 February 2004. Köln: Rüdiger Köppe Verlag.
- Amargira, Adelino. 2011. "The function of tone in Tennet," in Matthias Brenzinger (ed.), Proceedings of the 6th World Congress of African Linguistics Cologne 2009, Köln, Germany. Rüdiger Köppe Verlag.
- Arensen, Jonathan E. 1992. Mice are men: Language and society among the Murle of Sudan. International Museum of Cultures Publication, 27. Dallas: International Museum of Cultures.
- Arensen, Jonathan E. 1998. "Murle categorization," in Gerrit Dimmendaal and Marco Last (eds.), Surmic Languages and Cultures. 181–218. Köln: Rüdiger Köppe Verlag.
- Arensen, Jonathan, Nicky de Jong, Scott Randal, Peter Unseth. 1997. "Interrogatives in Surmic Languages and Greenberg's Universals," Occasional Papers in the Study of Sudanese Languages 7:71–90. Nairobi: Summer Institute of Linguistics.
- Greenberg Joseph. 1966. "Some universals of grammar with particular reference to the order of meaningful elements." In Joseph Greenberg, ed., Universals of Human Language, 73-113, 2nd ed. Cambridge: MIT Press.
- Kenstowicz, Michael & Charles Kisseberth. 1979. Generative phonology. San Diego: Academic Press.
- Randal, Allison. 2000. "Does Tennet have postpositions?" Occasional papers in the study of Sudanese languages. 8:57-66. Nairobi: Summer Institute of Linguistics.
- Randal, Scott. 1998. "A grammatical sketch of Tennet," in Gerrit Dimmendaal (ed.), Surmic Languages and Cultures. 219–272. Köln: Rüdiger Köppe Verlag.
- Randal, Scott. 1995. "Nominal morphology in Tennet," M.A. thesis, University of Texas at Arlington.
- Randal, Scott. 2000. "Tennet's ergative origins," Occasional papers in the study of Sudanese languages. 8:67-80. Nairobi: Summer Institute of Linguistics.
- Tucker, Archibald N. & Margaret A. Bryan. 1956. The non-Bantu languages of northeastern Africa. "Handbook of African languages, 3." London: Oxford University Press for International African Institute.
