= Majang language =

Eastern Sudanic language of Ethiopia

Majang
- Ato Majangerongk
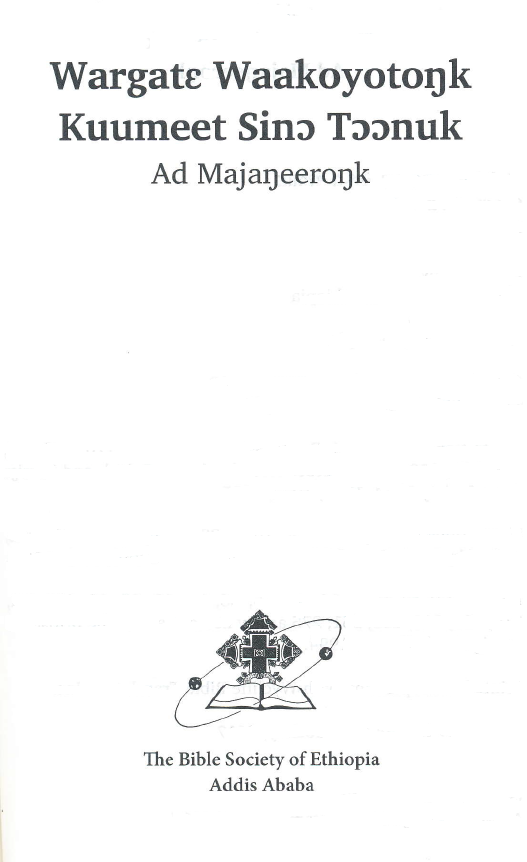
- Title page of the New Testament in the Majang language (2018)
- Native to: Ethiopia
- Region: Godere, Gambela Region
- Ethnicity: Majang
- Native speakers: 30,000 (2019)
- Language family: Nilo-Saharan?: Eastern Sudanic?; Southern Eastern?; Surmic; North; Majang

Language codes
- ISO 639-3: mpe
- Glottolog: maja1242

The Majang language is spoken by the Majangir people of Ethiopia. Although it is a member of the Surmic language cluster, it is the most isolated one in the group (Fleming 1983). A language survey has shown that dialect variation from north to south is minor and does not seriously impede communication. The 2007 Ethiopian Census lists 6,433 speakers for Majang (Messengo), but also reports that the ethnic group consists of 32,822 individuals (Messengo and Mejengir). According to the census, almost no speakers can be found in Mezhenger Zone of Gambela Region; a total of eleven speakers are listed for the zone, but almost 10,000 ethnic Mejenger or Messengo people.

== Phonology ==
The vowel inventory below is taken from Joswig (2012) and Getachew (2014, p. 65).

Vowels of Majang
	Front	Central	Back
Close	i iː		u uː
Close-mid	e eː		o oː
Open-mid	ɛ ɛː		ɔ ɔː
Open		a aː	

Vowel length is distinctive in Majang, so meanings change depending on whether a vowel is long or short, such as goopan 'punishment' and gopan 'road'. Unseth (2007) posed a 9-vowel system with a row of -ATR closed vowels ɪ and ʊ. Moges claims a tenth vowel ɐ, whereas Bender (1983) was only ready to confirm six vowels. All authors agree that there is no ATR vowel harmony in the language.

Consonants of Majang
		Labial	Alveolar	Palatal	Velar
Nasal		m	n	ɲ	ŋ
Stop	voiceless	p	t	tʃ	k
Stop	voiced	b	d	dʒ	ɡ
Implosive		ɓ	ɗ		
Tap			r		
Approximant			l	j	w

Bender also claims that the glottal stop [ʔ] needs to be treated as a phoneme of Majang though Unseth refutes this. Majang has two implosives, bilabial and coronal, which Moges Yigezu has studied acoustically and distributionally.

=== Prosodic Features ===
Tones distinguish meaning in Majang, on both the word level and the grammatical level: táŋ (higher tone) 'cow', tàŋ (lower tone) 'abscess'. The tonal inventory consists of two tone levels, with falling and rising contour tones possible at the end of phonological words, plus automatic and non-automatic downstep.

== Morphology ==
The language has markers to indicate three different past tenses (close, mid, far past) and two future tenses (near and farther).

The language has a wide variety of suffixes, but almost no prefixes. Though its use is limited to a handful of roots, there are a few words that preserve vestiges of the archaic causative prefix i-, a prefix found in other Surmic languages and also Nilotic.

The counting system is a modified vigesimal system, based on 5, 10, and 20. "Twenty" is 'one complete person' (all fingers and toes), so 40 is 'two complete people', 100 is 'five complete people'. However, today, under the influence of schools and increased bilingualism, people generally use the Amharic or Oromo words for 100.

The person and number marking system does not mark the inclusive and exclusive we distinction, a morphological category that is found in nearby and related languages.

== Syntax ==
Majang has a basic VSO word order, though allowing some flexibility for focus, etc. The language makes extensive use of relative clauses, including for circumstances where English would use adjectives. A recent study states that Majang is characterized by a strong morphological ergative-absolutive system, and a conjoint-disjoint distinction which is based on the presence or absence of an absolutive noun phrase directly following the verb. Many of these distinctions are coded by tonal differences.

Majang, and some related Surmic languages, has been shown to be exceptional to some syntactic typological predictions for languages with verb-subject-object word order. Majang has postpositions and question words sentence-finally, two properties that had been predicted to not occur in languages with VSO word order.

== See also ==
- Shabo word list (Wiktionary) [contains a word list of Majang]

== Bibliography ==
- Bender, M. Lionel. 1983. "Majang Phonology and Morphology," in M. Lionel Bender, (ed.), Nilo-Saharan Language Studies, pp. 114–47. East Lansing, MI: Michigan State University, African Studies Center.
- Fleming, Harold. 1983. "Surmic etymologies" in Rainer Vossen and Marianne Bechhaus-Gerst (eds.),Nilotic Studies: Proceedings of the International Symposium on Languages and History of the Nilotic Peoples. Berlin: Dietrich Reimer. pp. 524–555.
- Getachew Anteneh Yigzaw. 2014. Grammatical Description and Documentation of Majang. Ph.D. Thesis. Addis Ababa University. hdl:123456789/16341
- Joswig, Andreas. 2012. "The Vowels of Majang" in Brenzinger, Matthias and Anne-Maria Fehn (eds.), Proceedings of the 6th World Congress of African Linguistics, Cologne 2009. Köln: Rüdiger Köppe Verlag. pp. 263–267.
- Joswig, Andreas. 2015a: "Syntactic Sensitivity and Preferred Clause Structure in Majang" in Angelika Mietzner, Anne Storch (eds.): Nilo-Saharan: Models and Descriptions. Köln: Rüdiger Köppe Verlag, pp. 169–176.
- Joswig, Andreas. 2015b: The Basics of Majang Tone. SIL International.
- Joswig, Andreas. 2019. The Majang Language. Ph.D. Thesis. Leiden University. published by Amsterdam: LOT Publications. hdl:1887/73814
- Joswig, Andreas (2023). "33 - Majang". In Meyer, Ronny; Zelealem Leyew; Bedilu Wakjira (eds.). Oxford Handbook of Ethiopian Languages. Oxford: Oxford University Press. pp. 758–778.
- Moges Yigezu. 2007. "The Phonetics and Phonology of Majang Vowels: A Historical-Comparative Perspective” in Doris Payne and Mechthild Reh (eds.), Advances in Nilo-Saharan Linguistics. Köln: Rüdiger Köppe Verlag. pp. 255–265.
- Unseth, Peter. 1988. "Majang Nominal Plurals: With Comparative Notes," Studies in African Linguistics 19.1:75-91.
- Unseth, Peter. 1989. "Sketch of Majang Syntax," in M. Lionel Bender (ed.), Topics in Nilo-Saharan Linguistics. (Nilo-Saharan: Linguistic Analyses and Documentation, vol. 3. Series editor Franz Rottland.) Hamburg: Helmut Buske Verlag. pp. 97–127.
- Unseth, Peter. 1991. "Consonant Sequences and Morphophonemics in Majang" in Richard Pankhurst, Ahmed Zekaria and Taddese Beyene (eds.), Proceedings of the First National Conference of Ethiopian Studies. Addis Ababa: Institute of Ethiopian Studies. pp. 525–534.
- Unseth, Peter. 1998. "Two Old Causative Affixes in Surmic," in Gerrit Dimmendaal (ed.), Surmic Languages and Cultures. Köln: Rüdiger Köppe Verlag. pp. 113–126.
- Unseth, Peter. 2007. "Mağaŋgir language" in ed. by Siegbert Uhlig (ed.) Encyclopaedia Aethiopica, Vol 3. Wiesbaden: Harrassowitz. pp. 627–629.
