= Didinga language =

Eastern Sudanic language of South Sudan

Didinga
- Lango
- Native to: South Sudan
- Region: Didinga Hills
- Ethnicity: Didinga (Chukudum, Lowudo)
- Native speakers: 100,000 (2017)
- Language family: Nilo-Saharan?: Eastern Sudanic?; Southern Eastern?; Surmic; South; Southwest; Didinga–Murle; Didinga–Longarim; Didinga

Language codes
- ISO 639-3: did
- Glottolog: didi1258

The Didinga language (’Di’dinga) is a Surmic language spoken by the Chukudum and Lowudo peoples of the Didinga Hills of South Sudan. It is classified as a member of the southwest branch Surmic languages (Fleming 1983). Its nearest relative is Longarim.

The New Testament in the Didinga language was dedicated in March 2018.

== Relevant literature ==
- De Jong, N., 2001. The ideophone in Didinga. Typological studies in language 44, pp.121–138.
- Fleming, Harold. 1983. "Surmic etymologies," in Nilotic Studies: Proceedings of the International Symposium on Languages and History of the Nilotic Peoples, Rainer Vossen and Marianne Bechhaus-Gerst, 524–555. Berlin: Dietrich Reimer.
- Odden, David. 1983. Aspects of Didinga phonology and morphology. Nilo-Saharan language studies, pp. 148–176.
