= Temein languages =

Temein
- Nuba Hills
- Geographic distribution: Nuba Mountains of Sudan
- Linguistic classification: Nilo-Saharan?: Eastern Sudanic?; Southern Eastern?; Temein
- Subdivisions: Temein; Doni; Tese

Language codes
- Glottolog: teme1251
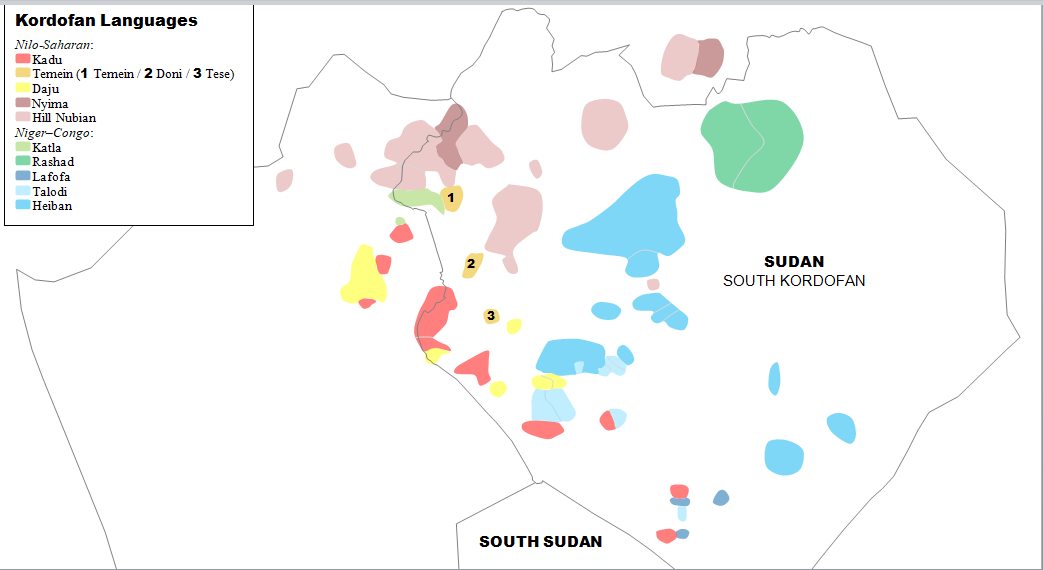

The Temein languages, or Nuba Hills languages, are a group of Eastern Sudanic languages spoken in the Nuba Mountains of Sudan.

== Languages ==
The Temein languages are not closely related.

- Temein (Ronge; 10,000 speakers)
- Doni (Keiga Jirru)
- Tese (Dese)

Temein is the most conservative language; Doni and Tese have been strongly influenced by Kadu languages.

== Demographics ==
Demographic information of the three Temein languages according to Blench (2013):

| Group | People | Language | Population | Location |
|---|---|---|---|---|
| Temein | ɔ̀rɔ́ŋgɔ̀ʔ (Stevenson); ɔ́ràntɛ̀t, pl. kààkɪ́nɪ́ ɔ́rɔ̀ŋɛ̀ (Dimmendaal) | lɔ́ŋɔ na rɔŋɛ (Stevenson); ŋɔ́ŋɔ́t ná ɔ́rɔ̀ŋɛ (Dimmendaal) | 10,000 | Temein hills southwest of Dilling, between Jebels Ghulfan Morung and Julud (Gulud) |
| Keiga Jirru | ɗóni | alŋak na ɗóni | 1000 ? | Keiga Jirru west of Debri, and in 6 villages, northeast of Kadugli |
| Tese (Teisei umm Danab) | t̪ɛséʔ | ilək ka t̪ɛséʔ | 1000 ? | Tesei hills |

== See also ==
- Temein word lists (Wiktionary)
