= Tirma people =

Tirma
Regions with significant populations
- Ethiopia, South Sudan

Languages
- Suri

Religion
- African Traditional Religion, minority Christianity

Related ethnic groups
- Surmic peoples

Tirma are a surmic ethnic group in Ethiopia and in South Sudan. They speak Suri. The population of this group is numbered in the tens of thousands.
