= Temein people =

Languages
- Temein

Religion
- Sunni Islam

Temein also known as Ronge is an ethnic group in the Nuba Hills in Sudan. They speak Temein, a Nilo-Saharan language. Temein live in The Temein hills, which are about 25 miles south of Dilling.

The Temein are farmers and they are accustomed to practising terrace cultivation to grow their staple crops like Sorghum although occasional drought and the occurrence of pests often lead to crop failure and ensuing famines.
