= Temein language =

Eastern Sudanic language spoken in Sudan

Temein
- Ronge
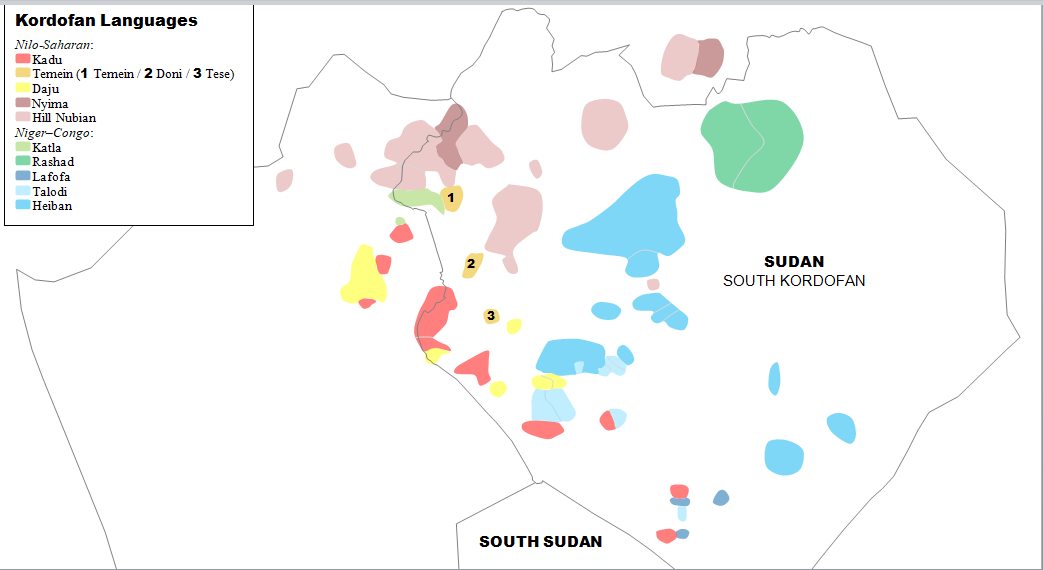
- Native to: Sudan
- Region: Nuba Hills
- Ethnicity: Temein
- Native speakers: 13,000 (2006) (6,000 in the ancestral area, 7,000 scattered in other towns)
- Language family: Nilo-Saharan?: Eastern Sudanic; Southern Eastern; Temein; Temein
- Writing system: Latin

Language codes
- ISO 639-3: teq
- Glottolog: nucl1339
- ELP: Temein
- Temein is classified as Severely Endangered by the UNESCO Atlas of the World's Languages in Danger.

Temein, also known as Ron(g)e, is an Eastern Sudanic language spoken by the Temein people of the Nuba Hills in Sudan.

Ronge is an approximation of the endonym. Stevenson reports the people are ɔ̀rɔ́ŋɡɔ̀ʔ and the language lɔ́ŋɔ na rɔŋɛ; Dimmendaal has ɔ́ràntɛ̀t for a person, kààkɪ́nɪ́ ɔ́rɔ̀ŋɛ̀ for the people, and ŋɔ́nɔ́t ná ɔ́rɔ̀ŋɛ for the language.

Temein is spoken in Farik, Kuris, Kwiye, Nekring, Tokoing, Tukur, and Tulu villages (Ethnologue, 22nd edition).

== Phonology ==
=== Consonants ===
| | | Labial | Dental | Alveolar | Palatal | Velar |
|---|---|---|---|---|---|---|
| Plosive | voiceless | p | t̪ | t | | k |
| Plosive | voiced | b | d̪ | d | ɟ | g |
| Nasal | | m | n̪ | n | ɲ | ŋ |
| Fricative | | | | s | | |
| Rhotic | | | | r | | |
| Approximant | | w | | l | j | |

- /p/ may have allophones of [ɸ, f] when in word-initial position.
- /s/ may have an allophone of [ʃ] in word-medial intervocalic positions.
- The sequence /nt/ can have an allophone of [ɽ] in intervocalic positions.

=== Vowels ===
| | Front | Central | Back |
|---|---|---|---|
| Close | i | | u |
| Near-close | ɪ | | ʊ |
| Close-mid | e | | o |
| Open-mid | ɛ | | ɔ |
| Open | | a | |
