= Singulative number =

Grammatical number

In linguistics, singulative number and collective number (abbreviated sgv and col) are terms used when the grammatical number for multiple items is the unmarked form of a noun, and the noun is specially marked to indicate a single item.

This is the opposite of the more common singular–plural pattern, where a noun is unmarked when it represents one item, and is marked to represent more than one item.

In some cases, a further distinction is made between the collective and what is known in some terminologies as the plurative, the former referencing multiple items as a class, the latter referencing them as individual units.

Greenberg's linguistic universal #35 states that no language is purely singulative-collective in the sense that plural is always the null morpheme and singular is not.

== Examples ==
=== Welsh ===
Welsh has two systems of grammatical number, singular–plural and collective–singulative. Since the loss of the noun inflection system of earlier Celtic, plurals have become unpredictable and can be formed in several ways: by adding a suffix to the end of the word (most commonly -au), as in tad "father" and tadau "fathers", through vowel affection, as in bachgen "boy" and bechgyn "boys", or through a combination of the two, as in chwaer "sister" and chwiorydd "sisters". Other nouns take the singulative suffixes -yn (for masculine nouns) or -en (for feminine nouns). Most nouns which inflect according to this system designate objects that are frequently found in groups, for example adar "birds/flock of birds", aderyn "bird"; mefus "a bed of strawberries", mefusen "a strawberry"; plant "children", plentyn "a child"; and coed "forest", coeden "a tree". Still other nouns use suffixes for both singular and plural forms (e.g. merlen "a pony", merlod "ponies", the unsuffixed *merl does not exist); these are similar to nouns formed from other categories of words (e.g. cardod "charity" gives rise to cardotyn "a beggar" and cardotwyr "beggars").

When translating the Welsh collective noun into English the plural is usually used, e.g. mefus → 'strawberries'. However, the Welsh collective also has a sense of a homogenous whole which the English plural cannot convey; compare the English 'foliage' vs. 'leaves'.

=== Other languages ===
Singulatives are featured in some Semitic and Slavic languages.

In Arabic grammar, the singulative is called اسم الوحدة ism al-waħdah "noun of unity". It is formed by the suffixes:

1. ة -a(t), applies to animals, plants, and inanimate objects
2. ي -ī, applies to sentient beings

suffix ة -a(t)
collective	singulative
قمح qamḥ "wheat"	قمحة qamḥa(t) "a grain of wheat"
شجر shajar "trees"	شجرة shajara(t) "a tree"
بقر baqar "cattle"	بقرة baqara(t) "a cow"

suffix ي -ī
collective	singulative
جن jinn	جني jinnī
زنج zinj "black African people"	زنجى zinjī "a black African person"

In some cases, the singulative has a further plural indicating a collection of the singular units, which may be broken or regular.

broken	جند jund 'army'	جندي jundī 'a soldier'	جنود junūd 'soldiers'
regular	عسكر `askar 'army, military'	عسكري `askarī 'a soldier, private, or enlisted man'	عسكريون `askarīyūn 'soldiers, privates, enlisted men'

In East Slavic languages, which are basically of singular–plural system, the singular suffix -ин- ('-in-', Russian, '-yn-', Ukrainian), resp. '-ін-' ('-in-', Belarusian) performs the singulative function for collective nouns.

	collective	singulative
Russian	горох, gorokh "peas in mass"	горошина, goroshina "a single pea"
Ukrainian	пісок, pisok "sand"	піщина, pischyna "grain of sand"
Belarusian	бульба, buĺba "potatoes in mass", e.g. as a crop or as a species	бульбіна, buĺbina "one potato tuber"

Notice the affix '-a' in all these examples, which indicates the feminine form. Notice also that plural forms may be derived from these singulatives in a regular way: goroshina->goroshiny (several peas), etc.

In both East Slavic and Arabic, the singulative form always takes on the feminine gender.

Singulative markers are found throughout the Nilo-Saharan languages. Majang, for example, has:

ŋɛɛti → ŋɛɛti-n
lice.COL {} louse.SGV

In Dutch, singulative forms of collective nouns are occasionally made by diminutives:

snoep → snoepje
{"sweets, candy"} {} {"sweet, piece of candy"}

These singulatives can be pluralized like most other nouns: snoepjes "several sweets, pieces of candy".

== Comparison with mass nouns ==
A collective form such as the Welsh moch, "pigs", is more basic than the singular form mochyn, "a pig". It is generally the collective form which is used as an adjectival modifier, e.g. cig moch ("pig meat", "pork"). The collective form is therefore similar in many respects to an English mass noun such as "rice", which in fact refers to a collection of items which are logically countable. However, English has no productive process of forming singulative nouns (just phrases such as "a grain of rice"). Therefore, English cannot be said to have singulative number.

== Plurative ==
In some cases, in addition to the collective and singulative forms, a third form, called the "plurative" in the terminology of some scholars, is distinguished from the collective. The collective form, in these cases, denotes multiple items as a class while the plurative denotes them as individuals. Compare, for example, "people" in "People are funny" with "people" in "the people in this room", though in English the same plural form is used for both purposes.

Example: In Arabic, for samak, "fish":

- samak, collective form, fish in general
- samak-a(t), samak-e, singulative, a single fish
- ʔasmaak, plurative, as in "many fish" or "three fish"

== See also ==
- Grammatical number
- Plural

== Bibliography ==
- Bender, M. Lionel. 1983. "Majang phonology and morphology". In Nilo-Saharan Language Studies, 114–147. East Lansing: Michigan State University.
- Corbett, Greville G. 2000. Number. Cambridge Textbooks in Linguistics. Cambridge University Press. ISBN 0-521-33845-X
- Tiersma, Peter Meijes. 1982. "Local and General Markedness." Language 58.4: 832-849
