= Mekan people =

Mekan
Total population
- 56,585 (1998)

Regions with significant populations
- Ethiopia

Languages
- Me'en language

Related ethnic groups
- Surmic peoples

The Mekan, or Me'en are a Surmic ethnic minority group inhabiting southwestern Ethiopia. The 1998 census lists them as consisting of 56,585 individuals. The Mekan traditionally participate in a unique festival known as Ka'el, during which the Mekan women sexualize the process of Mekan men gaining weight, and assist and encourage them in becoming as fat as possible. Mekan women will often select partners during this festival, typically from among the men they assisted in becoming larger.

The Mekan or Me'en speak the Me'en language, which is a member of the Surmic language family. The population is subdivided into two groups: the highland Tishena, who are agriculturalists, and the lowland Bodi, who are pastoralists.

== Ka'el Festival ==
In 2020, photographer Joey Lawrence traveled to a village in Southern Ethiopia's Omo Valley to photograph the Kael competitors and make a behind the scenes documentary.

• 2021 winners: Oypocha and Gontidi

== Bibliography ==
- Abbink, Jon G. 1990. "Tribal Formation on the Ethiopian Fringe: Toward a History of the 'Tishana'." Northeast African Studies. Volume 12.1: pp. 21–42.
- Abbink, Jon G. 1991. "The Deconstructions of Tribe: Ethnicity and Politics in Southwestern Ethiopia." Journal of Ethiopian Studies. Volume 24: pp. 1–21.
- Abbink, Jon G. 1992. "An Ethno-Historical Perspective on Me'en Territorial Organization (Southwest Ethiopia)." Anthropos. Volume 87.4/6: pp. 351–364.
