= Pierri =

Pierri is a surname. Notable people with the surname include:

- Alberto Pierri (born 1948), Argentine businessman and politician
- Álvaro Pierri (born 1953), Uruguayan classical guitarist
- Luis Pierri (born 1963), Uruguayan basketball player
- Olga Pierri (1914–2016), Uruguayan guitarist and educator

== See also ==
- Perri (name)
- Pierre
