= Murle language =

Surmic Language of South Sudan and Ethiopia

Murle
- Murlɛ
- Murleye
- Native to: South Sudan, Ethiopia
- Ethnicity: Murle
- Native speakers: 200,000 (2017)
- Language family: Nilo-Saharan?: Eastern Sudanic?; Southern Eastern?; Surmic; Southern; Southwest; Didinga–Murle; Murle
- Dialects: Olam (Ngalam); Boma; Lotilla
- Writing system: Latin

Language codes
- ISO 639-3: mur
- Glottolog: murl1244
- ELP: Murle

Murle (also Ajibba, Beir, Merule, Mourle, Murule) is a Surmic Language spoken by the Murle people in the southeast of South Sudan, near the Ethiopian border. A very small number of Murle live across the border in southwestern Ethiopia.

The basic word order for Murle clauses is VSO (verb–subject–object). The morphology of the verb agrees with the person and number of the subject, and can also indicate that of the object. Some typologically exceptional points of grammar are discussed by Arensen, et al., such as that VSO languages have been predicted to not have postpositions or final interrogatives.

Marking of number on nouns in Murle is complex, with no single suffix being generally productive. Some nouns are marked with a singulative suffix, some with a plural suffix, some with both, and a few with irregular stems for each number. Arensen has proposed a set of semantically based categories (such as association with men, or with weather and seasons) to try to predict which suffixes will be used (1992, 1998).

Payne (2006) has proposed analyzing some cases as examples of subtractive morphology. Payne proposes that these two forms exemplify how Murle plurals can be predicted from singular forms, but not vice versa.

onyiit 'rib' onyii 'ribs'

rottin 'warrior' rotti 'warriors'

However, the same final consonants are found in productive marking of singulative number in Majang, another Surmic language, e.g. ŋɛɛti-n 'louse', ŋɛɛti 'lice'. Also, final -t has been shown to be a singulative suffix in Murle and other Surmic languages, fitting the pattern of T for singular and K for plural pointed out by Margaret Bryant. If these final consonants are analyzed as singulative suffixes, it means that the claim of unusual discovery of subtractive morphology in Murle is incorrect. Rather, Murle is shown to have a frequent pattern of singulative suffixes.

The New Testament has been translated into the Murle language.

== Phonology ==
=== Consonants ===
		Labial	Dental	Alveolar	Post- alveolar	Palatal	Velar
Stop/ Affricate	voiceless	p	t̪	t	tʃ		k
Stop/ Affricate	voiced	b	d̪	d	dʒ		g
Stop/ Affricate	implosive	ɓ			ɗ̠		ɠ
Fricative		v	ð	z			
Nasal		m		n		ɲ	ŋ
Trill				r			
Lateral				l			
Approximant		w				j	

=== Vowels ===
	+ATR		-ATR		
	Front	Back	Front	Central	Back
Close	i	u	ɪ		ʊ
Mid	e	o	ɛ		ɔ
Open				a	

Vowel length is also distinctive.

== Literature ==
- Arensen, Jonathan E. 1982. Murle grammar. Occasional Papers in the Study of Sudanese Languages 2. Juba: Summer Institute of Linguistics and University of Juba.
- Arensen, Jonathan E. 1988. "Names in the life cycles of the Murle". Journal of the Anthropological Society of Oxford 19: 125-130.
- Arensen, Jonathan E. 1989. "On comparing language relationships: A case study of Murle, Kacipo and Tirma". Occasional Papers in the Study of Sudanese Languages 6: 67-76
- Arensen, Jonathan E. 1991. Aspects of language and society among the Murle of Sudan. D.Phil. thesis. Wolfson College, Oxford University.
- Arensen, Jonathan E. 1992. Mice are men: Language and society among the Murle of Sudan. International Museum of Cultures Publication, 27. Dallas: International Museum of Cultures.
- Arensen, Jonathan E. 1998. "Murle categorization" in Gerrit Dimmendaal and Marco Last (eds.), Surmic Languages and Cultures. Köln: Rüdiger Köppe Verlag. pp. 181–218.
- Lyth, R. E. 1971. The Murle Language: Grammar and Vocabulary. Linguistic Monograph Papers 7 Khartoum: University of Khartoum.
- Miller, Cynthia. 1984. "Connectives in Murle epistolary discourse". Occasional Papers in the Study of Sudanese Languages 5: 81-134.
- Unseth, Peter. 1986. "Word Order Shift in Negative Sentences of Surma Languages". Afrikanistische Arbeitspapiere 5: 135-143.
- Unseth, Peter. 2007. "Murle language" in Siegbert Uhlig (ed.) Encyclopaedia Aethiopica, Vol 3. Wiesbaden: Harrassowitz. pp. 1076–1077.
- Yigezu, Moges. 2001. A Comparative Study of the Phonetics and Phonology of Surmic Languages. Université Libre de Bruxelles.
