= Boma Plateau =

Region of eastern South Sudan

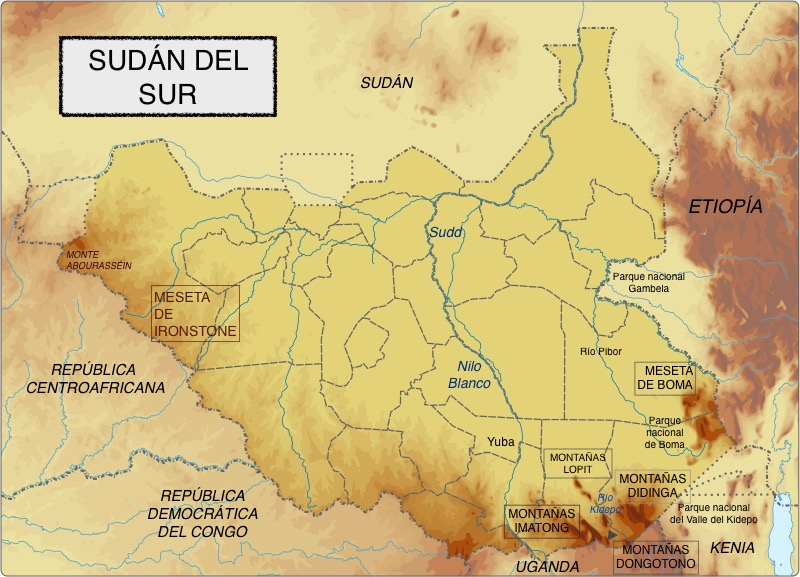
South Sudan Mountains with Boma Plateau.

The Boma Plateau is a region in the east of South Sudan, located in the Jonglei and Eastern Equatoria provinces. It is inhabited by the Anuak, Murle, and Toposa peoples. It contains wetlands important for birdlife in the region. Wildlife is threatened by overgrazing by cattle, and by overhunting by local tribes with firearms.

Within it, Boma National Park (2,280,000 ha; 8,800 sq mi) was established in 1977.

The Boma Plateau is also one of the few places in the world where wild Coffea arabica grows.

It is contiguous with the Ethiopian Highlands.
