= Laarim language =

Surmic language of South Sudan

Laarim
- Narim
- Laarim
- Native to: South Sudan
- Region: Laarim Hills
- Ethnicity: Laarim
- Native speakers: (3,600 cited 1984)
- Language family: Nilo-Saharan?: Eastern Sudanic?; Southern Eastern; Surmic; South; Southwest; Didinga–Murle; Didinga–Longarim; Laarim

Language codes
- ISO 639-3: loh
- Glottolog: nari1240
- ELP: Narim

Laarim (Larim, Longarim) or Narim is a Surmic language spoken by the Laarim people of the Laarim Hills of South Sudan.

== Distribution ==
According to Ethnologue, Laarim is spoken in 10 villages of northern Budi County, Eastern Equatoria State. Stirtz (2011) reports that there are as many as 22,000 speakers, living mainly in 14 villages west of Chukudum town.

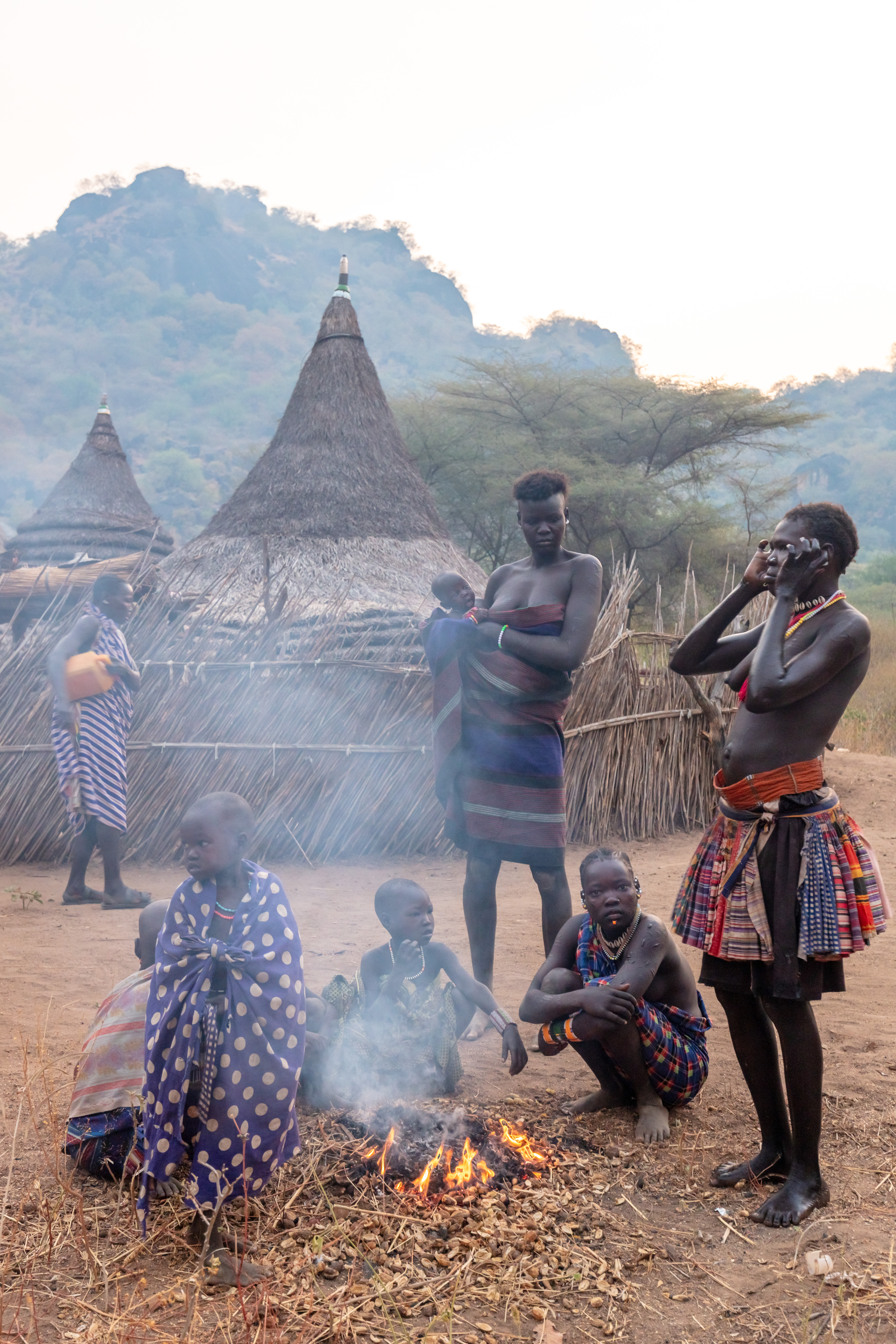
Laarmin people in a village in Kimatong, South Sudan
