= Meʼen language =

Nilo-Saharan language spoken in Ethiopia

Meʼen
- Mɛʼɛn
- Native to: Ethiopia
- Region: Eastern Africa
- Ethnicity: Me'en
- Native speakers: 150,000 (2007 census)
- Language family: Nilo-Saharan?: Eastern Sudanic?; Southern Eastern; Surmic; South Surmic; Southeast Surmic; Pastoral Surmic; Meʼen
- Writing system: Latin

Language codes
- ISO 639-3: mym
- Glottolog: meen1242
- ELP: Bodi

Meʼen (also Mekan, Mieʼen, Mieken, Meqan, Men) is a Nilo-Saharan language (Eastern Sudanic, Surmic, Southeast Surmic) spoken in Ethiopia by the Meʼen people. In recent years, it has been written with the Geʽez alphabet, but in 2007 a decision was made to use the Latin alphabet. Dialects include Bodi (Podi) and Tishena (Teshina, Teshenna).

Meʼen and Kwegu are unique among Surmic languages in that they have ejective consonants.

Reliable descriptions of some parts of the language have been produced by Hans-Georg Will, often contradicting Carlo Conti Rossini's work, the editing of the extensive language notes of a non-linguist.

== Phonology ==
Consonants
		Bilabial	Dental	Palatal	Velar	Glottal
Stop	voiceless	p	t	tʃ	k	
Stop	voiced	b	d	dʒ	ɡ	
Stop	ejective		tʼ	tʃʼ	kʼ	
Stop	implosive	ɓ	ɗ			
Fricative	voiceless	(f)	s	ʃ		h
Fricative	voiced		z			
Nasal		m	n	ɲ	ŋ	
Rhotic			ɾ			
Glide		w	l	j		

/p/ can be realized as a fricative [f] in initial and medial positions.

Vowels
	Front	Central	Back
Close	i		u
Close-mid	e		o
Open-mid	ɛ		ɔ
Open		a	

/i, u/ can have lax variants as [ɪ, ʊ].
