= Kwegu language =

Surmic language spoken in Ethiopia

Kwegu
- Native to: Ethiopia
- Region: Southwest, Omo River west bank
- Ethnicity: 5,100 Kwegu (2007 census)
- Native speakers: (ca. 300 cited 1987-1990)
- Language family: Nilo-Saharan?: Eastern Sudanic?; Southern Eastern?; Surmic; South; Southeast; Kwegu
- Dialects: Yidinich (Yidinit); Muguji

Language codes
- ISO 639-3: xwg
- Glottolog: kweg1241
- ELP: 2677; Kwegu
- Coordinates: 7.0°N 36.083°E

Kwegu (also Bacha, Koegu, Kwegi, Menja, Nidi) is a Surmic language spoken in the Southwest of Ethiopia, on the west bank of the Omo River.
