= Surmic languages =

Sub-family of the Eastern Sudanic languages

Surmic
- Geographic distribution: southwestern Ethiopia and southeastern South Sudan
- Linguistic classification: Nilo-Saharan?: Eastern Sudanic?; Southern Eastern?; Surmic
- Proto-language: Proto-Surmic
- Subdivisions: Majang; South Surmic

Language codes
- Glottolog: surm1244

The Surmic languages are a branch of the Eastern Sudanic language family.

Today, the various peoples who speak Surmic languages make their living in a variety of ways, including nomadic herders, settled farmers, and slash and burn farmers. They live in a variety of terrain, from the lowlands of South Sudan and the banks of the Omo River to mountains over 2,300 meters.

== Languages ==
According to the Max Planck Institute for Evolutionary Anthropology, the Surmic languages are classified as follows:

- Surmic
  - Majang
  - South Surmic
    - Southeast Surmic
      - Kwegu
      - Pastoral Surmic
        - Me'en
        - Tirma–Chai–Mursi
          - Mursi
          - Tirma–Chai
    - Southwest Surmic
      - Baale–Olam
        - Kacipo–Balesi
        - Ngaalam
      - Didinga–Murle
        - Didinga–Longarim
          - Didinga
          - Narim
        - Murle
        - Tennet

The Surmic languages are found in southwest Ethiopia and adjoining parts of southeast South Sudan. In the past, Surmic had been known as “Didinga-Murle” and “Surma”. The former name was too narrow by referring only to two closely related languages and the latter was a label also used to refer to a specific language (Unseth 1997b), so the label “Surmic” is now used. The relationships in the chart above are based on Fleming's work (1983).

== History of study ==
Much foundational fieldwork and analysis of Surmic languages was done by Harold C. Fleming and M. L. Bender. The most complete descriptions of Ethiopian Surmic languages are of Murle (Arensen 1982) and Tirma (Bryant 1999). An overview of linguistic and anthropological research on Surmic is the book edited by Dimmendaal (1998), especially the bibliography article (Abbink and Unseth 1998).

== Phonology ==
All Surmic languages are presumed to be tonal, have implosive consonants, and have distinctive vowel length. Some have as many as nine vowel qualities, and more detailed study may confirm this in other Surmic languages, also. Me'en and Kwegu (also spelled Koegu) have sets of ejective consonants.

== Grammar ==
The languages share a system of marking the number of both the possessed and the possessor in possessive pronouns (Unseth 1991). Number of nominals is typically marked on a number of morphemes, with t/k marking singular and plural (Bryan 1959). Adjectives are formed by stative relative clauses.

Majangir (also called Majang) and Southwest Surmic languages (Fleming 1983) share a number of traits, so they are therefore presumably reconstructible in Proto-Surmic:

- relative clauses (which include adjectives), demonstratives, adverbs, numerals, genitives, and possessive pronouns follow their heads;
- noun derivations and subject marking on verbs are marked by suffixes;
- VSO (verb–subject–object) order predominates in indicative main clauses.

Some typologically exceptional points are discussed by Arensen, et al. (1997). However, Dimmendaal’s introduction proposes a different analysis (1998).

All Surmic languages have been documented as having case suffixes (Unseth 1989). None of them have a marked accusative, but at least Majang and Murle sometimes mark nominatives, part of a broader areal pattern (König 2006).

== Reconstruction ==
The sound systems of Proto-Southwest Surmic and Proto-Southeast Surmic have been reconstructed by Yigezu (2001). Unseth has proposed reconstructions for several parts of Proto-Surmic grammar: case suffixes the marking of possession, and causative prefixes. Abbink (2006) compares the kinship systems and vocabulary among Surmic languages, particularly from the South West node of Surmic.

The Proto-Surmic homeland is thought to be in Southwestern Ethiopia, somewhere near Maji, with the various groups dispersing from there: for example, the Majangir having moved north, the Murle having migrated clockwise around Lake Turkana (Arensen 1983:56-61, Tornay 1981), and the Mursi having moved into and out of the Omo River valley. Ethnolinguistic identities within the Surmic group have not been rigid, with ample evidence of people’s identities shifting from one ethnolinguistic group to another (Tornay 1981, Turton 1979, Unseth and Abbink 1998).

== Numerals ==
Comparison of numerals in individual languages: One of the shared innovations that separates Southeast Surmic languages from the rest of Surmic is that they have a base 10 system, rather than building to 10 from 5, such as five-plus-one, etc.

Classification	Language	1	2	3	4	5	6	7	8	9	10
North, Majang	Majang (1)	òmóŋ, òm	pɛ́ɛ́jǃ *	ɟíítǃ	àŋàn	tùùl	tùùl à òm (5 + 1)	tùùl à pɛ́ɛ́jǃ (5 +2)	tùùl à ɟíítǃ (5 + 3)	tùùl à àŋàn (5 + 4)	áárŋǃ
North, Majang	Majang (2)	oˈmʊŋ	pʰɛɛj	d͡ʒiitʰ	ˈaŋan	tʰuul	tʰuula ʔom (5 + 1)	tʰuula pʰɛɛj (5 +2)	tʰuula d͡ʒiitʰ (5 + 3)	tʰuula aŋan (5 + 4)	ˈaarin
South, Southeast, Kwegu	Kwegu (Koegu) (1)	kíum	ɗáa	jien	áhur	cuu	la (borrowed from Kara)	tsʼoba (borrowed from Kara)	lunkáí (borrowed from Kara)	sal (borrowed from Kara)	tómon
South, Southeast, Kwegu	Kwegu (2)	kium	ɗaa	jien	ahur	cuu	la	tsʼoba	lunkai	sal	tomon
South, Southeast, Pastoral, Me’en	Me'en	kɔ̂náŋ	ramáŋ	sizzí	wut͡ʃ	hat͡ʃʼánáŋ	illè	issabò	isset	sáal	tɔ̂mmɔn
South, Southeast, Pastoral, Suri	Mursi (1)	ɗɔ́nɛ́j	ràmàn	sízzí	wùʃ	háánán	íllɛ́	íssábài / also ~issábaj	íssé / also ~ísséj	sákkàl	tɔ́mmɔ́n (maybe borrowed)
South, Southeast, Pastoral, Suri	Mursi (2)	ɗɔ́nɛ́j	raman	sízzi	wuʃ	háánán	illɛ	isaabaj	isse	sakal	tɔmɔn
South, Southeast, Pastoral, Suri	Suri	ɗɔ́nɛ	ràmmán	sízzì	wùʃ / wùy	háyɛ́ná	ìllɛ̀y	ìsàbbày	ìssèy	sàkkàl	tɔ̀mɔ̀n
South, Southwest, Didinga-Murle, Didinga-Longarim	Didinga	xɔ̀ɗɛ́ɪ	ràmːá	ìyyó	ʊ̀wwétʃ	t̺úɾ	t̪ɔ̀ɾkɔ̀nɔ́n (5+ 1)	t̪ʊ́ɾkɪ́ɾámːá (5+ 2)	t̪úɾkɪ́yyó (5+ 3)	t̪ʊ́ɾkʊ́wwétʃ (5+ 4)	ɔmɔt̪ɔ
South, Southwest, Didinga-Murle, Didinga-Longarim	Laarim (Narim)	odoi, codoi	ramma	iyyio	wẽẽc	tur	torkonom (5+ 1)	turɡerem (5+ 2)	turɡi (5+ 3)	torkõwõc (5+ 4)	õmmõtõ
South, Southwest, Didinga-Murle, Murle	Murle	codoi / aˈdoi	rǎm	iːˈyǔ	oic /wec	tǔːɾ	tɔrkɔnǒm (5+ 1)	turɡɛrɛ́m (5+ 2)	turɡɛ (5+ 3)	torkɔc (5+ 4)	amɔ̌tɔ
South, Southwest, Didinga-Murle, Tennet	Tennet (Tenet)	tʃɔ́ɗɛ̂	rámːá	íjó	wétʃ	túɾ̥	tɔ̀ɾ̥kónóm (5+ 1)	tóɾ̥ɡéɾém (5+ 2)	túɾɡè (5+ 3)	tóɾ̥kôtʃ (5+ 4)	òmòtò
South, Southwest, Kacipo-Balesi	Kacipo-Balesi (1)	óɗè	rámmá	íyó	wèhé	tűr	tɔ̀rkɔ̀nɔ́	tʉ̀rɡɛ̀rɛ́	tùrɡè	tɔ́rɡɔ̀ɡɔ̀	ɔ̀mɔ̀ðɔ̀
South, Southwest, Kacipo-Balesi	Kacipo-Balesi (2)	óóɗē	rámmá	íyyó	wé ̀	túr	tɔ̄rkɔ́hɔ̄ (5+ 1)	tʊ̄rɡɛ́rɛ̄ (5+ 2)	tūrɡē (5+ 3)	tɔ̀rɡɔ́ɡɔ̄ (5+ 4)	ɔ̄mɔ̄ðɔ́

== See also ==
- List of Proto-Surmic reconstructions (Wiktionary)

== Relevant literature ==
- Abbink, Jon. 2006. Kinship and society among Surmic-speakling people in Southwest Ethiopia: A brief comparison. Proceedings of the XVth International Conference of Ethiopian Studies, edited by Siegbert Uhlig, pp. 9–14. Wiesbaden: Otto Harrassowitz Verlag.
- Abbink, Jon and Peter Unseth. 1998. "Surmic Languages and Cultures: A Bibliography." Surmic Languages and Cultures, ed. by Gerrit Dimmendaal, pp. 127–142. Cologne: Köppe.
- Arensen, Jonathan. 1983. Sticks and straw: Comparative house forms in southern Sudan. Dallas: International Museum of Cultures.
- Arensen, Jon, Nicky de Jong, Scott Randal, Peter Unseth. 1997. "Interrogatives in Surmic Languages and Greenberg's Universals," Occasional Papers in the Study of Sudanese Languages 7:71–90.
- Bender, M. Lionel. "The Surma language group: a preliminary report". Studies in African Linguistics, Supplement 7, pp. 11–21.
- Bryan, Margaret. 1959. The T/K Languages: A New Substratum. Africa 29:1–21.
- Bryant, Michael. 1999. "Aspects of Tirmaga grammar." MA thesis, University of Texas at Arlington.
- Dimmendaal, Gerrit. 1998. "A syntactic typology of the Surmic family from an areal and historical-comparative point of view," in Surmic Languages and Cultures, ed. by Gerrit Dimmendaal, pp. 35–82. Cologne: Köppe
- Fleming, Harold. 1983. "Surmic etymologies," in Nilotic Studies: Proceedings of the International Symposium on Languages and History of the Nilotic Peoples, Rainer Vossen and Marianne Bechhaus-Gerst, 524–555. Berlin: Dietrich Reimer.
- König, Christa. 2006. "Marked nominative in Africa," Studies in Language 30.4: 655–732.
- Moges Yigezu, "A comparative study of the phonetics and phonology of Surmic languages". Ph.D dissertation. Université Libre de Bruxelles, 2002
- Tornay, Serge. 1981. "The Omo Murle Enigma," in Peoples and cultures of the Ethio-Sudan Borderland, M.L. Bender (ed.), pp. 33–60. (Northeast African Studies, Monograph 10). East Lansing: Michigan State University.
- Turton, David. 1979. "A Journey Made Them: Territorial Segmentation and Ethnic Identity Among the Mursi," in Segmentary Lineage Systems Reconsidered, Ladislav Holý (ed.), 19–143. (Queen's University Papers in Social Anthropology, vol. 4). Belfast.
- Unseth, Peter. 1987. "A Typological Anomaly in Some Surma Languages," Studies in African Linguistics 18.357–361.
- Unseth, Peter. 1988. "The Validity and Unity of the Southeast Surma Language Grouping," Northeast African Studies 10.2/3:151–163.
- Unseth, Peter. 1997b. "Disentangling the Two Languages Called 'Suri'," Occasional Papers in the Study of Sudanese Languages 7:49–69.
- Unseth, Peter and Jon Abbink. 1998. "Cross-ethnic Clan Identities Among Surmic Groups," in Surmic Languages and Cultures, Gerrit Deimmendaal (ed.), pp. 103–112. Cologne: Koppe.
