= Southern Eastern Sudanic languages =

Eastern Sudanic language branch

Southern Eastern Sudanic
- Kir-Abbaian
- (undemonstrated)
- Geographic distribution: Chad, Ethiopia, Kenya, South Sudan, Sudan, Uganda
- Linguistic classification: Nilo-Saharan?: Eastern Sudanic?; Southern Eastern Sudanic
- Subdivisions: Nilotic; Surmic; Eastern Jebel; Temein; Daju?

Language codes
- Glottolog: None

Eastern Sudanic languages: Group k (northesastern sudanic languages) (pink) Group n (southesastern sudanic languages) (yellow)

The Southern Eastern Sudanic, Eastern n Sudanic, En Sudanic or Kir-Abbaian languages form one of two primary divisions of the Eastern Sudanic languages in the classification of Bender (2000). It is rejected as an established group in Starostin (2015).

The Southern Eastern Sudanic languages are characterized by having an /n/ in the pronoun "I/me", as opposed to the Northern Eastern Sudanic languages, which have a /k/. The best known Southern Eastern Sudanic language group, as well as the largest, is Nilotic, which includes such languages as Maasai.

== Southern Eastern Sudanic roots ==
Bender (1996) offers fifteen possible En Sudanic innovations.

| English | Proto-En-Sudanic | Surmic | Eastern Jebel | Temein | Daju | Nilotic |
|---|---|---|---|---|---|---|
| fire | *ma(a)(tt) | Majang maaɗ | Eastern Jebel maʔa, mɔɔ | --- | Daju *maas | Nilotic *mat, *mac |
| neck | *ŋOr- | Majang ŋool | Eastern Jebel ŋal(g) | Temein ŋalo | Daju *ŋaas- | Nilotic *ŋut |
| white-yellow | *pVr | Murle fɔɔr | Gaam bɔɔr | Temein fʊr | ---- | Dinka-Nuer b(i)or |
| steal | *(a)gOl | Majang agal | Gaam gəəɬ | Temein proper agul | Logorik eguxo | Nilotic *kuOl |
