= Ethiopians in Sweden =

Ethiopian diaspora in Sweden

Total population
- 17,944

Regions with significant populations
- Stockholm, Gothenburg, Malmö, Hallonbergen

Languages
- Amharic, Oromo, Tigrinya, Swedish

Religion
- Christianity (Ethiopian Orthodox Tewahedo Church), Islam

Ethiopians in Sweden are citizens and residents of Sweden who are of Ethiopian descent.

== Demographics ==
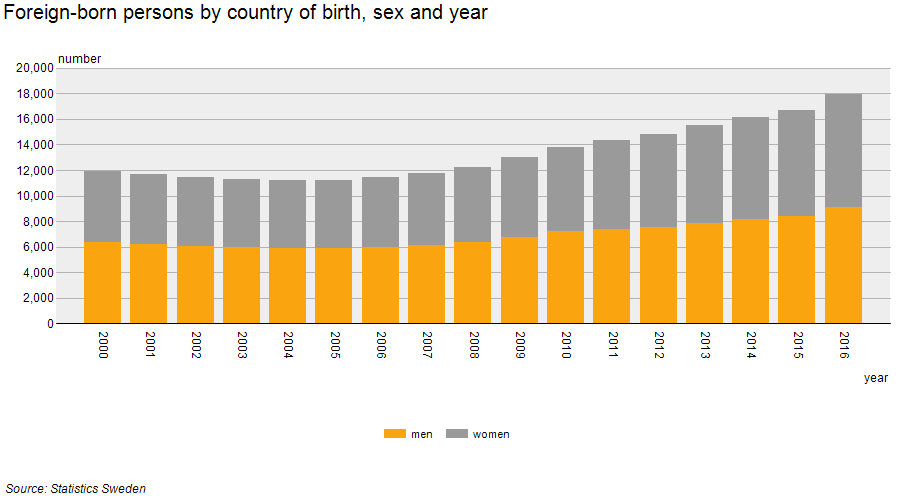
Ethiopia-born persons in Sweden by sex, 2000-2016 (Statistics Sweden).

According to Statistics Sweden, as of 2016, there are a total 17,944 Ethiopia-born immigrants living in Sweden. Of those, 6,225 are citizens of Ethiopia (3,319 men, 2,906 women). In 2016, there were 88 registered remigrations from Sweden to Ethiopia. Abeba Aregawi became the first Swedish-Ethiopian woman, competing in the 1500 metres event, to win gold at the 2013 World Championships in Athletics and bronze at the 2012 Olympics in London.

== Education ==
According to Statistics Sweden, as of 2016, 20% of Ethiopia-born individuals aged 25 to 64 have attained a primary and lower secondary education level (17% men, 23% women), 44% have attained an upper secondary education level (42% men, 46% women), 14% have attained a post-secondary education level of less than 3 years (15% men, 12% women), 19% have attained a post-secondary education of 3 years or more (23% men, 16% women), and 3% have attained an unknown education level (2% men, 3% women).

== Employment ==
According to Statistics Sweden, as of 2014, Ethiopia-born immigrants aged 25–64 in Sweden have an employment rate of approximately 64%. The share of employment among these foreign-born individuals varies according to education level, with employment rates of around 47% (49% males, 46% females) among Ethiopia-born individuals who have attained a primary and lower secondary education level (2,587 individuals), 70% (70% males, 71% females) among those who have attained an upper secondary level (5,739 individuals), 68% (68% males, 67% females) among those who have attained a post-secondary education level of less than 3 years (1,800 individuals), and 70% (67% males, 76% females) among those who have attained a post-secondary education level of 3 years or more (2,434 individuals).

According to the Institute of Labor Economics, as of 2014, Ethiopia-born residents in Sweden have an employment population ratio of about 53%. They also have an unemployment rate of approximately 9%.

== See also ==
- Ethiopia–Sweden relations
- Education in Sweden
- Ethiopians in the United Kingdom
- Ethiopians in Italy
- Ethiopians in Germany
- Ethiopians in Denmark
- Ethiopians in Norway
