= Ethiopia–Sweden relations =

- Ethiopia: Sweden

Ethiopia–Sweden relations are foreign relations between Ethiopia and Sweden. These relations include foreign aid, Christian missionary efforts from Sweden to Ethiopia, as well as cultural exchanges. Some members of the Ethiopian diaspora also reside in Sweden.

== Aid ==
Through the Swedish International Development Cooperation Agency, the Ethio-Swedish Pediatric Clinic (ESPC) was established in 1958 at Haile Selassie I University with Swedes Edgar Mannheimer and Yngve A. A. Larsson as its first directors. In the 1960s, the Lideta Maternal and Child Health Center (or Lideta MCH Clinic) was established with financing from the Swedish branch of Save the Children by pediatrician Dr Ulla Larsson.

As of 2011, Sweden provides about 145 million crowns ($21 million) in aid to Ethiopia per year with a focus on measures to support democracy and human rights. Ethiopia has also been a recipient of part of about 800 million crowns in humanitarian aid 2011 as a result of the drought in the Horn of Africa.

== Swedish diplomat 2006 ==
In 2006 was the expulsion of two EU officials, Swedish Mr. Björn Jonsson and Italian Enrico Sborgi (Good Governance Department of the EU) from Ethiopia. EU stopped the support funds in protest, which helped to release opposition members from the prison.

== Swedish journalists 2011 ==
An Ethiopian judge sentenced two Swedish journalists in December 2011 to eleven years prison. They were accused of terrorist crimes and for entering Ethiopia illegally. Sweden sought cooperation with EU and other countries to release the men. They were pardoned and released on 10 September 2012.

Amnesty International demanded on 21 December 2011 to release immediately and unconditionally two Swedish journalists convicted by an Ethiopian court despite their legitimate journalistic work. According to Amnesty Ethiopien tries to silence the critics. The freedom of press is restricted.

According to the International Federation of Journalists (IFJ) "This is clearly an unfair and unjust sentence which adds to the anxiety of our colleagues and their families. The Swedish Union of Journalists is going to work closely with the journalists' families and is demanding that the Swedish Government ensures this injustice is remedied and our colleagues can return to their families and colleagues."

Reporters Without Borders was outraged that an Addis Ababa court found Swedish journalists Johan Persson and Martin Schibbye guilty of supporting terrorism. RWB voiced disapproval of the way the Ethiopian judicial system was handling the case and warned of the danger of serious diplomatic repercussions of the jail sentences. “Every meeting between Ethiopian officials and their European or western counterparts will henceforth be affected by this case.”

== Trade ==
All imports from Ethiopia to Sweden are duty-free and quota-free, with the exception of armaments, as part of the Everything but Arms initiative of the European Union.

== See also ==
- Foreign relations of Ethiopia
- Foreign relations of Sweden
- Carl Gustaf von Rosen
- Onesimos Nesib
- Yngve A. A. Larsson
- Ethiopians in Sweden
