= Ethiopians in Norway =

Ethiopian diaspora in Norway

Total population
- 11,505 (2020 Official Norway estimate) 0.22% of the Norwegian population

Regions with significant populations
- Oslo

Languages
- Amharic, Oromo, Tigrinya, Other Languages of Ethiopia, Norwegian

Religion
- Ethiopian Orthodox, Islam

Ethiopians in Norway are citizens and residents of Norway who are of Ethiopian descent.

== Demographics ==
According to Statistics Norway, in 2017, there were a total 7,888 persons of Ethiopian origin living in Norway. Of those, 2,499 individuals were born in Norway to immigrant parents. In 2020 the number had risen to 11,505 persons, making Ethiopians the third biggest migration group from Africa after Somalis and Eritreans. Most of the Ethiopians in Norway have come to Norway as asylum seekers.

== Socioeconomics and Crime ==
According to Statistics Norway, as of 2014, around 40% of Ethiopia-born immigrants have a persistently low income.

According to Statistics Norway, as of 2015, a total of 104 Ethiopia citizens residing in Norway incurred sanctions. The principal breaches were traffic offences (49 individuals), followed by other offences for profit (13 individuals), drug and alcohol offences (11 individuals), public order and integrity violations (11 individuals), violence and maltreatment (11 individuals), property theft (7 individuals), criminal damage (2 individuals), sexual offences (0 individuals), and other offences (0 individuals).

== Education ==
According to Statistics Norway, as of 2016, among a total 6,851 Ethiopia-born immigrants aged 16 and older, 3,198 individuals had attained a below upper secondary education level, 1,382 had attained an upper secondary education level, 90 had attained a tertiary vocational education level, 1,211 had attained a higher education level of up to four years in duration, 791 had attained a higher education level of more than four years in duration, and 179 had no education.

== Employment ==
According to Statistics Norway, as of 2016, Ethiopia-born immigrants aged 15–74 in Norway have an employment rate of approximately 52%. As of 2017, their unemployment rate was also about 4.9%.

== See also ==
- Ethiopia–Norway relations
- Demographics of Ethiopia
- Oriental Orthodoxy in Norway
- Ethiopians in Denmark
- Ethiopians in Sweden
