= Ethiopians in Italy =

Ethiopian diaspora in Italy

- Ethiopian population in Italy by province.

Total population
- 30,000 (estimate) (2000); 6,851 (Ethiopian-born residents) (2021)

Regions with significant populations
- Rome, Milan, Parma, Turin

Languages
- Tigrinya · Tigre · Arabic · Saho · Bilen · Italian

Religion
- Christian (Ethiopian Orthodox Tewahedo, Catholic, P'ent'ay) · Islam

Ethiopians in Italy are citizens and residents of Italy who are of Ethiopian descent. Many people of Ethiopian origin have become Italian citizens and are therefore no longer included in the demographic statistics.

== History ==
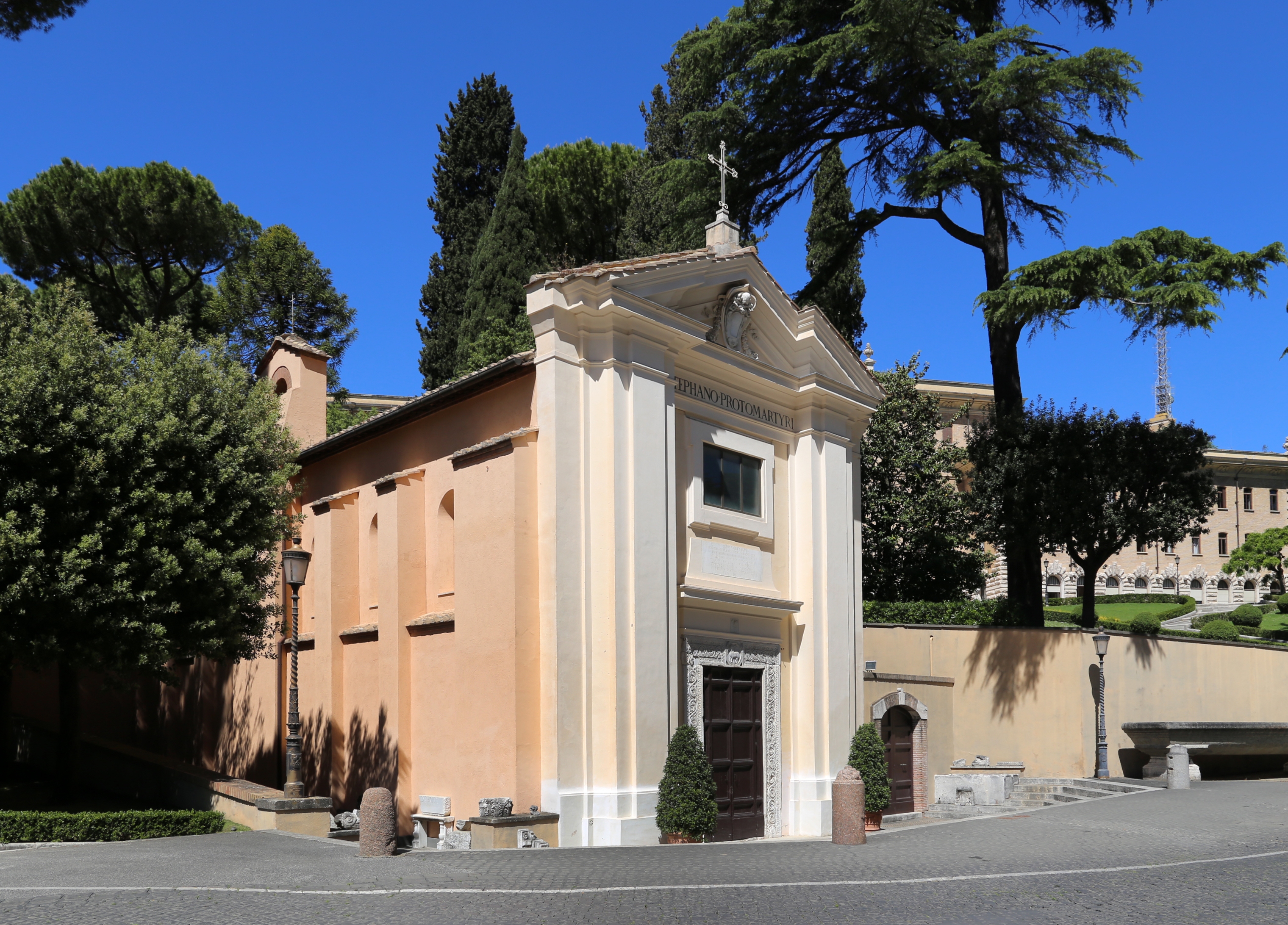
Santo Stefano degli Abissini in the Vatican, the national church of the Ethiopian community of Rome.

Ethiopian pilgrims have been recorded in Rome since the early 15th century. By the early 16th century, the Ethiopian community was well-established in Rome, centered on the church of Santo Stefano degli Abissini.

Ethiopians in Italy were 7,772 in 2016, up from 6,656 in 2007. While the historical presence is linked to the training of priests at the Ethiopian College, contemporary Ethiopian immigration is rather feminized and linked to the domestic work market. It is a contained and constant migratory flow.

Asylum requests in Italy by Ethiopian citizens remain limited compared to the total (2,155 in 2015). Of these, 85% obtained a residence permit for international or humanitarian protection. Italy is also a crossing point for Ethiopian refugees headed to Northern Europe (United Kingdom and Sweden). Often, due to the Dublin Regulations, such asylum seekers are then sent back to Italy.

In Rome the Ethiopian community (as well as the Eritrean one) is concentrated in the Termini station area: via Milazzo and via dei Mille, via Volturno and via Montebello.

== Demographics ==
As of 2021, most Ethiopian nationals residing in Italy live in Rome, Milan, Parma, and Turin. The following table lists Italian provinces by Ethiopian population.

Rank	Province	Population (2021)
1	Rome	2243
2	Milan	713
3	Parma	417
4	Turin	236
5	Bari	216
6	Bologna	202
7	Udine	131
8	Florence	123
9	Bergamo	120
10	Brescia	94
11	Pisa	88
12	Modena	86
13	Naples	81
14	Viterbo	77
15	Venice	69
16	Terni	65
17	Varese	60
18	Perugia	84
18	Reggio Emilia	56
18	Trentino	56
21	Como	51
21	Palermo	51
23	Genoa	50
24	Pavia	49
25	Arezzo	45
26	Frosinone	42
26	Teramo	42
26	Trapani	42
29	Piacenza	41
30	Padua	40
30	Ragusa	40
32	South Tyrol	36
33	Verona	33
34	Lecco	32
35	Rieti	31
36	Ancona	30
36	Catania	30
36	Macerata	30
39	Agrigento	29
39	Syracuse	29
41	Cosenza	28
42	Latina	27
42	Messina	27
44	Mantua	26
44	Livorno	26
46	Lucca	25
46	Pistoia	25
48	Alessandria	24
49	Pesaro and Urbino	23
50	Cuneo	22
50	Vicenza	22
52	Massa-Carrara	21
52	Pordenone	21
52	Treviso	21
55	Siena	20
56	Gorizia	19
56	Lodi	19
56	Monza and Brianza	19
59	Brindisi	18
59	Forli-Cesena	18
61	Chieti	17
61	Savona	17
63	Rimini	16
63	Trieste	16
65	Fermo	15
65	Prato	15
65	Salerno	15
65	Taranto	15
69	Caserta	14
70	Asti	13
71	Ascoli Piceno	12
71	Cagliari	12
71	Campobasso	12
74	Cremona	11
74	L'Aquila	11
74	Pescara	11
74	Reggio Calabria	11
74	Verbano-Cusio-Ossola	11
74	Vercelli	11
80	Belluno	10
80	Catanzaro	10
80	Crotone	10
80	Lecce	10
84	Barletta-Andria-Trani	8
84	Potenza	8
86	Imperia	7
86	La Spezia	7
86	Nuoro	7
89	Avellino	6
89	Biella	6
89	Enna	6
89	Foggia	6
89	Grosseto	6
94	Benevento	5
94	Matera	5
94	Sassari	5
97	Sondrio	4
98	Caltanissetta	3
98	Novara	3
98	Oristano	3
101	Ferrara	2
101	Rovigo	2
103	Isernia	1
103	Vibo Valentia	1
105	Aosta Valley	0
N/A	South Sardinia	Information unavailable

== Notable people ==
- Saba Anglana, singer
- Dagmawi Yimer, filmmaker
- Yohanes Chiappinelli, runner and steeplechaser
- Yemaneberhan Crippa, runner
- Gabriella Ghermandi, writer and performer
- Aida Girma-Melaku, writer and UNICEF representative in Pakistan
- Agitu Ideo Gudeta, entrepreneur and environmentalist
- Mel Taufer, football player
- Eyob Zambataro, football player

== Associations ==
- Association of the Ethiopian community in Rome

== See also ==
- Ethiopian diaspora
- Immigration to Italy
- Ethiopia–Italy relations
