= Yngve Larsson =

Swedish politician (1881 - 1977)

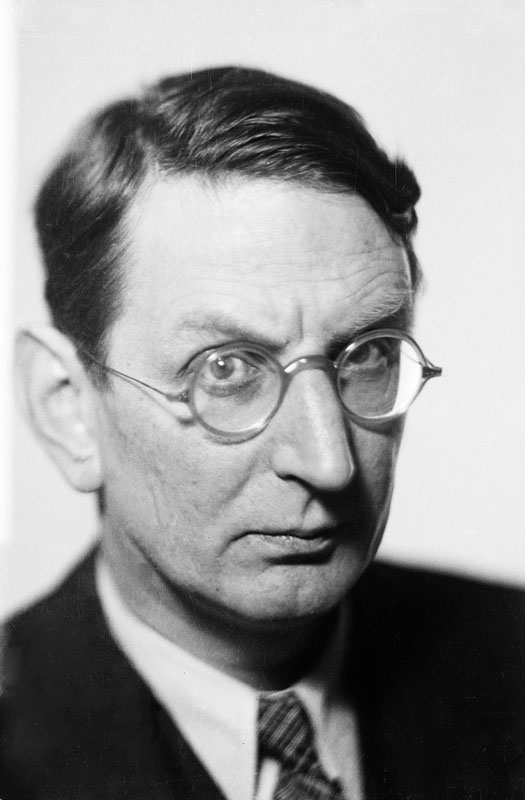
- Yngve Larsson photographed by Jan de Meyere
- Born: 13 December 1881; Sundsvalls parish
- Died: 16 December 1977; Hedvig Eleonora and Oscar Parish
- Resting place: Skogskyrkogården
- Education: Uppsala University
- Occupation: Politician
- Employers: Svenska stadsförbundet; City of Stockholm
- Notable work: Inkorporeringsproblemet, Mitt liv i stadshuset, Sveriges utrikespolitik i världskrigets belysning
- Political party: Folkpartiet (Sweden)
- Spouse: Elin Larsson
- Children: Verna Lindberg, Matts Bergom Larsson, Richard Larsson, Mårten Larsson, Ester Berggren, Yngve A. A. Larsson
- Father: Axel Larsson
- Relatives: Lennart Larsson

Gustaf Richard Yngve Larsson (Swedish: [ˈʏ̂ŋːvɛ ˈlɑ̌ːʂɔn]; December 13, 1881 – December 16, 1977) was a Swedish political scientist, Municipal commissioner (Borgarråd), and Member of Parliament. He was an important force in the urban development of Stockholm during the post-war years, and came to be called his century's foremost Swedish city builder and Stockholm politician.

== Life ==
Yngve Larsson was born in Sundsvall but moved to Stockholm in the early 1890s with his family. He studied in Uppsala and was for a time active in radical politics. His graduate studies took place partly in Heidelberg and Berlin, and his doctoral thesis of 1913 focused on issues of urban planning and city administration, which would be the focus of his later career.

Originally a Social Democrat, Larsson was expelled from the party in 1915 for proposing Swedish collaboration with Germany in order to guarantee Finland's independence from Russia. After a few years outside party politics, he joined the Liberal Party in the late 1920s and, after a merger, was a successful candidate for the People's Party (currently The Liberals).

During the Second World War Larsson was a leading advocate for pro-Nordic anti-Nazi politics, and a board member of Samfundet Nordens Frihet and chairman of Svensk-Norska föreningen.

He was a marked modernist and was for 22 years a leading vice Mayor of Stockholm, in charge of urban development, and politically leading behind several of the city's largest urban development projects of the 20th century, including Slussen, Stockholm Metro and the major redevelopment of Norrmalm borough in central Stockholm. Larsson's role in the post-war planning of Stockholm and its new suburbs was internationally recognized. The American city planner Clarence Stein wrote that:

They have developed an organization for city building that is second only to that of the London County Council. But it differs from that in having a broader, more complete goal and ideal. This has been due I think largely to Yngve Larsson's statesmanship; also to his sympathetic understanding with Markelius and Sidenbladh as architect-planners, and with Holger Blom (an architect, too), who makes the parks throughout Stockholm rich with blooming color.

— Clarence Stein,1960,

Later judgments, however, have pointed at the sleazy preparatory work; it was for example assumed that the big corporations needed central offices in central Stockholm but when they were offered building lots after the clearances they declined. Stockholm Municipality was almost bankrupt in 1970 from having to fill the cleared lots at its own expense. Larsson came later to regret his own work and tried, in vain, to stop the clearances.

He was awarded several Swedish and foreign state orders. In 1946, King Haakon VII appointed Larsson as a Commander with Star of the Norwegian Order of St. Olav "for particularly outstanding merits of the Norwegian Resistance during the war." He also received the French Legion of Honour, Swedish Order of the Polar Star and Order of Vasa and the Order of the White Rose of Finland.

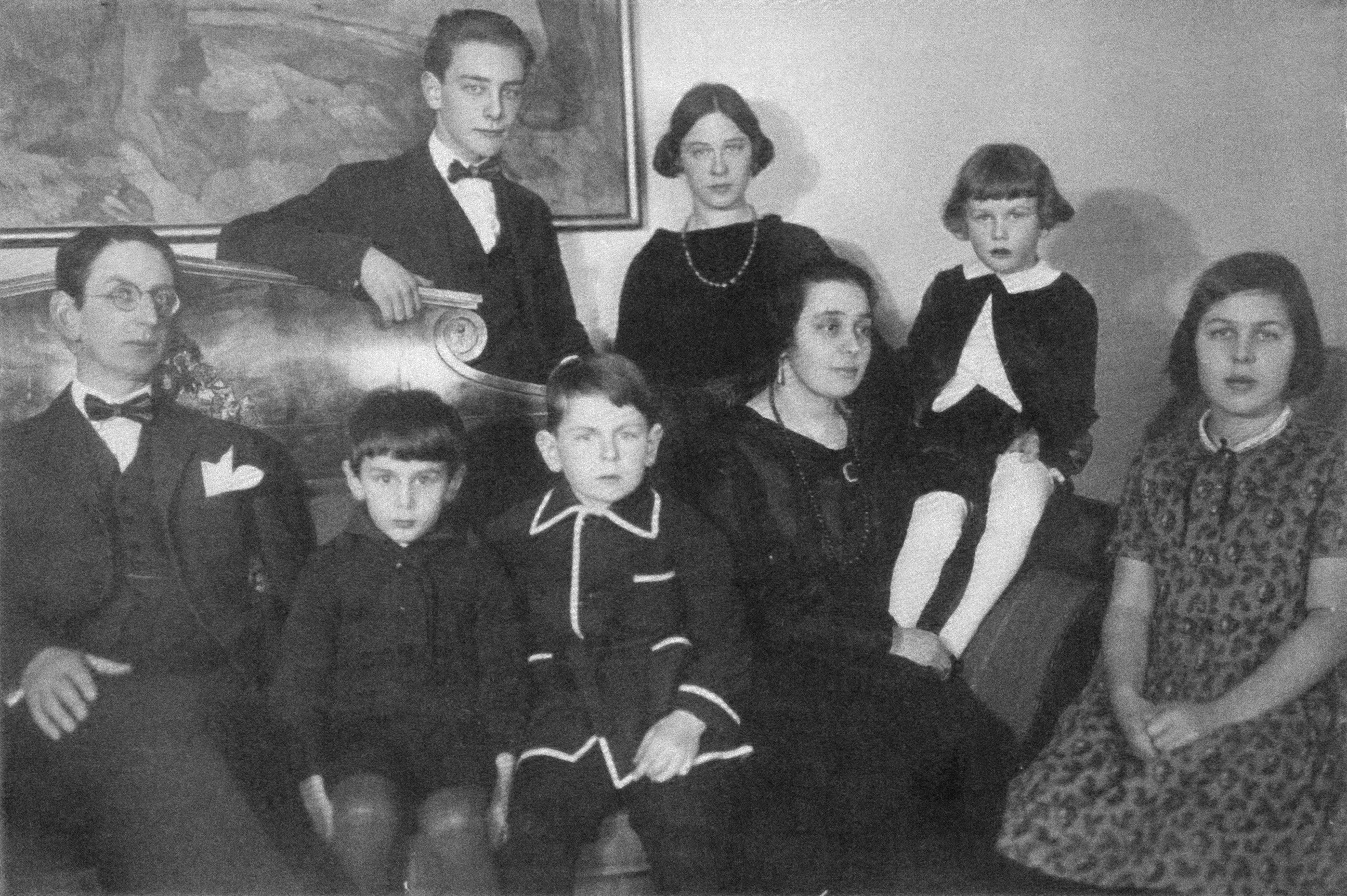
The Larsson family in 1925. Sitting on the far left is Yngve and beside him Yngve Jr.

Yngve Larsson was married to Elin (1884-1980), née Bonnier, and they had six children, including later professor Yngve A. A. Larsson.
