= Ethiopians =

People of Ethiopia

Total population

Regions with significant populations
- Ethiopia
- Saudi Arabia: 750,000
- United States: 460,000
- UAE: 200,000
- Israel: 177,600
- United Kingdom: 90,000
- Sudan: 73,000 refugees
- South Africa: 44,891
- Canada: 44,065
- Kenya: 36,889
- Sweden: 30,624
- Lebanon: 30,000
- France: 30,000
- Germany: 20,465
- Australia: 19,349
- South Sudan: 12,786
- Norway: 12,380
- Djibouti: 12,323
- Bahrain: 10,000
- Netherlands: 9,451
- Italy: 6,424
- Yemen: 5,740
- Switzerland: 5,211
- Spain: 3,713
- Kuwait: 3,595
- Greece: 2,420
- Finland: 2,366
- Denmark: 2,136
- Somalia: 2,079
- Libya: 1,831
- Qatar: 1,667
- Egypt: 1,457
- Tanzania: 1,400
- Austria: 1,276
- New Zealand: 1,187
- Belgium: 1,143
- Uganda: 1,070

Languages
- Amharic, Oromo, Somali, Tigrinya, Wolaytta, Gurage, Sidamo and other languages of Ethiopia

Religion
- Christian 60.9% - Predominantly Oriental Orthodox (Ethiopian Orthodox Tewahedo Church), Muslim 35.6%, Traditional 2.6%. Jewish 1%

Related ethnic groups
- Eritreans, Djiboutians, Somalis, Akhdam, other Horn Africans, and other Afro-Asiatic and Nilo-Saharan populations.

Ethiopians are the native inhabitants of Ethiopia, as well as the global diaspora of Ethiopia. Ethiopians constitute several component ethnic groups, many of which are closely related to ethnic groups in neighboring Eritrea and other parts of the Horn of Africa.

The first documented use of the name "Ethiopia" from Greek name Αἰθίοψ, Aithíops was in the 4th century during the reign of Aksumite king Ezana. There were three ethnolinguistic groups in the Kingdom of Aksum: Semitic, Cushitic, and Nilo-Saharan (ancestors of the modern-day Kunama and Nara). The Kingdom of Aksum remained a geopolitically influential entity until the decline of its capital — also named Axum — beginning in the 7th century. Nevertheless, the core Aksumite civilization was preserved and continued into the successive Zagwe dynasty. By this time, new ethnic groups emerged – the Tigrayans and Amharas. During the Solomonic period, the latter established major political and cultural influence in the Horn of Africa. In the Late Middle Ages, Muslim states were established, including the Sultanate of Ifat, and its successor the Adal Sultanate. Discontent with territory and religious dominance led to intense war between the Ethiopian Empire, the Christian state (consisting of the Amhara, Tigrayan, Soddo Gurage, and Agaw ethnic groups) and the Muslim state Adal Sultanate (consisting of Semitic-speaking Harari formally known as the Harla people, and the Argobba). During the 1600s, there were large-scale migrations of the Oromo from the south into the highlands and also alongside the Somali into Adal or what was known as "Hararghe" (land of the Hararis).

A period of stability and peace continued through the Gondarine period in 16th and 17th century, but Ethiopia was divided into de facto autonomous regions in the mid-18th century. During this time, Ethiopia was nominally ruled by an Emperor who functioned as a puppet monarch of various regional lords and noblemen. This era was known as the Zemene Mesafint or "Era of the Princes". Emperor Tewodros II managed to unify the decentralized Ethiopian Empire in 1855 and inaugurated a process of modernization that continued into successive regimes, resurrecting the empire as a regional power.

In the late 19th century during the reign of Menelik II, against the backdrop of the Scramble for Africa, the notion of Ethiopian national integrity was strengthened by Italian efforts at colonization. The Italian invasion engendered a formidable national resistance, culminating in the Battle of Adwa in 1896 which resulted in a major Ethiopian victory against the Italians. The resulting Treaty of Addis Ababa ended the Italo-Ethiopian War, and along with the nation's contemporaneous territorial expansion, largely established the modern-day boundaries of Ethiopia.

Present-day Ethiopia has a diverse population with many different languages and ethnic groups. Ethiopians speak Afro-Asiatic languages (Semitic, Cushitic, and Omotic) and Nilo-Saharan languages. The Oromo, Amhara, Somali and Tigrayans make up more than three-quarters (75%) of the population, but there are more than 80 different ethnic groups within Ethiopia. Some of these have as few as 10,000 members.

== History ==
=== Prehistory ===
Archaeologists found remains of early hominins, one of the most specimen was Australopithecus afarensis, also called "Lucy", which was discovered in the country's Awash Valley, so-called Hadar in 1974. It is estimated to be 3.5 million years old. In October 2015, scientists discovered the remains of a man called "Mota" in a cave in south-central Ethiopia, he lived 4,500 years ago. Atypical of Euroasians, who were believed to have reached the region after him, Mota's genetic variants did not include traits such as "light-colored eyes or skin," resembling the modern Aari tribes that live in the southern area of the country.

Other research suggests Euroasians that arrived in the region resemble modern-day Sardinians, or likely LBK culture of antiquity. By proofing Mota has no European genome, archeologist theorized the Near East population migrated to Africa in 3,000 years ago. Other evidence concluded that Eurasian population made significant contribution as a result of back migration between 1,500 and 3,500 years ago. Nilo-Saharan peoples do not exhibit this genetic similarity; instead, their DNA shows evidence of more recent admixture (less than 1200 years ago) with other African peoples.

It was thought that Hamitic people from Asia Minor had migrated before Semitic Arabian people in the 7th century BC. In 1933, G.W.B Huntingford proposed a theory of Azanian civilization could have existed in Kenya, and northern Tanzania, between the Stone Age and Islamic period. It was supposed that these people evicted from Ethiopia and Somalia by Muslim invasion to southern region in present-day Kenya and Tanzania where perished around 14th- and 15th-century.

About 7000 BC, Afro-Asiatic-speaking population namely Cushitic and Omotic-speaking people grouped in the present day of Ethiopia after which diversification thrived in the area and allowed the other local groups, the Agaws, Somali, Oromo, and numerous Omotic-speaking groups to unify. Originally a hunter gatherers, those people began domesticating indigenous plants thereafter, including the grasses teff, eleusine, enset, root crop, and domestication of cattles and other animals to fill agricultural livelihoods that still contemporary followed. By the late first millennium BC, the Agaws occupied the northern Ethiopian region, as the Sidamo occupied the central and southern parts of Ethiopia, making inaugural historical development of Ethiopia.

Afro-Asiatic languages were present in Africa and the Middle East by the eighth to sixth millennium BCE. This language family includes various modern and extinct African and Asian languages such as Oromo, Somali, Egyptian, Berber, Hausa, Hebrew, Arabic, Aramaic, and Akkadian. Ge'ez was developed around sixth century BCE and evident by inscriptions of contemporary kingdom of D'mt. The language dominance was eclipsed by 1000 AD, but the highland inhabitants used it as written scholar and liturgical language between 300s and 1800s.

=== Antiquity ===
In 980 BCE, Dʿmt was established in present-day Eritrea and the Tigray Region of Ethiopia, straddling South Arabia in present-day of Yemen. This polity's capital was located at Yeha, in what is now northern Ethiopia. Most modern historians consider this civilization to be a native Ethiopian one, although in earlier times many suggested it was Sabaean-influenced because of the latter's hegemony of the Red Sea.

Other scholars regard Dʿmt as the result of a union of Afroasiatic-speaking cultures of the Cushitic and Semitic branches; namely, local Agaw peoples and Sabaeans from Southern Arabia. However, Ge'ez, the ancient Semitic language of Ethiopia, is thought to have developed independently from the Sabaean language, one of the South Semitic languages. As early as 2000 BCE, other Semitic speakers were living in Ethiopia and Eritrea where Ge'ez developed. Sabaean influence is now thought to have been minor, limited to a few localities, and disappearing after a few decades or a century. It may have been a trading or military colony in alliance with the Ethiopian civilization of Dʿmt or some other proto-Axumite state.

Politically integrated, the Kingdom of Aksum was emerged independently from at least 100 BC, and its civilization grew from 1st century AD. The kingdom dominated the Red Sea, the Northeast Africa in the present location between northern Ethiopia (Tigray Region), eastern Sudan, Eritrea, South Arabia. It was by far powerful empire and trading nation between Roman Empire and India. The Aksumite lingua franca was Greek evolved from Hellenistic period in 330–305 BC and officially adopted in the first century. It was soon replaced by Ge'ez in the 4th century.

Politically and culturally influenced partially with Byzantine Empire, the Aksumite achieved major historical grounds, Orthodox Tewahedo Christianity introduced and has been state religion in the early 4th century, construction of stone-fitted palace and public buildings, and erection of large obelisks around the capital Axum. These all are milestones that culminate in the rise of Ethiopian identity where the Greek exonym "Ethiopians" came to use by the kingdom under king Ezana's reign in the 4th century.

The first century BCE Greek historian Diodorus Siculus claimed the Ethiopian nativity as "true natives", "most pious and righteous" in his record. This assertion resonated by locality of declaring themselves a "Habesha people". His record expounded the nature of Ethiopians, including highly proselytizing to neighboring Egypt. He denoted these people locating in the place superimposed by Nubia and Meroë, connected to the Nile river, having distinct rainy season and wonderful lake.

=== Middle Ages ===
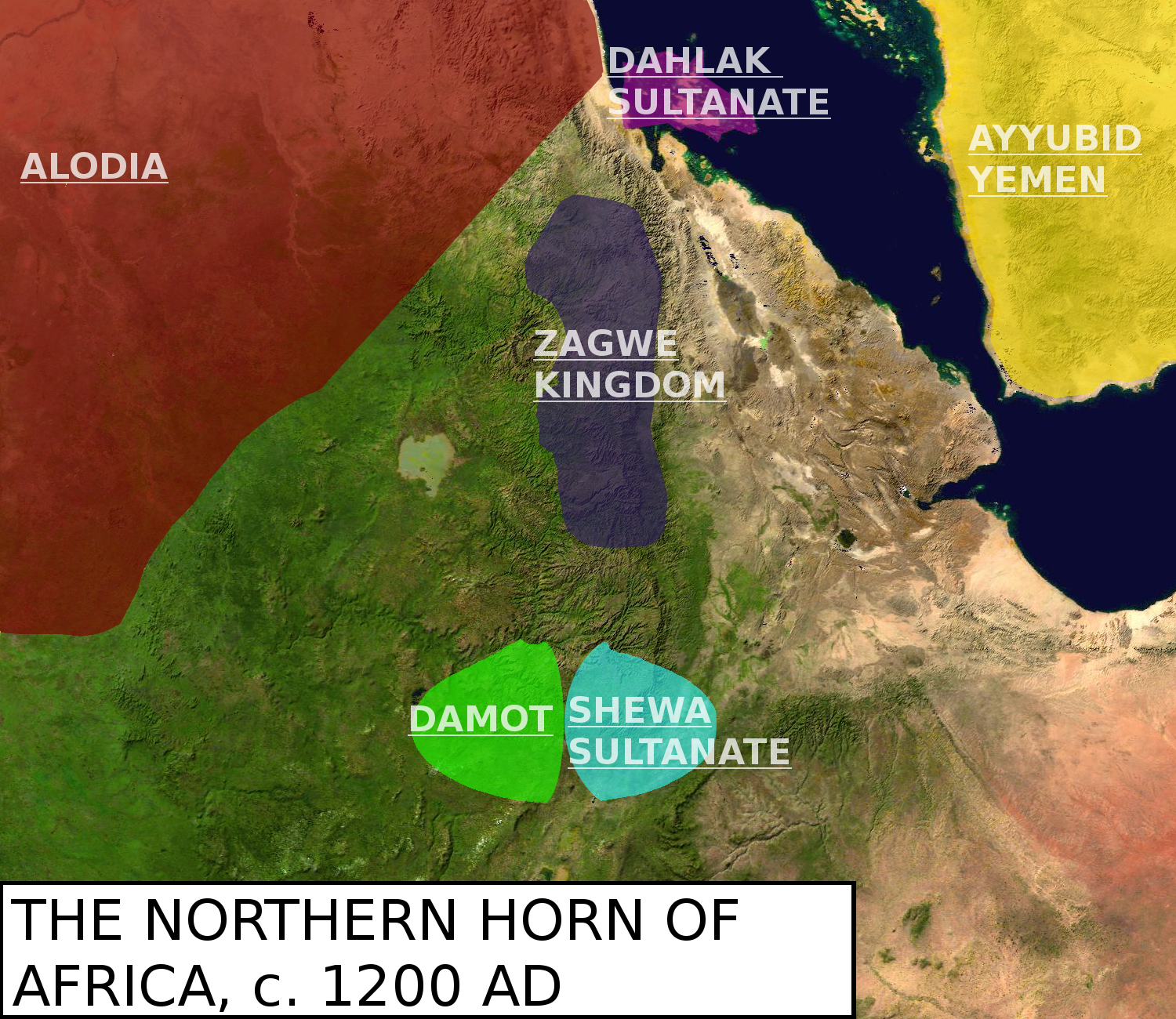
The Zagwe dynasty and its neighbors circa 1200 AD. During its three centuries rule, the Zagwe facilitated an interaction with surrounding non-Christian polities.

The kingdom enlarged its territory by the half of 4th century after conquering neighbor city Meroë in 330, and entered a "Golden Age" for the next three centuries. Aksum's power began declining at the time of the Islamic Golden Age, where they frequently countered intrusions by Arab Muslims in the South Arabia protectorate (modern Yemen), making them to evicted more in the southern of Agaw population.

In 10th century, the kingdom ultimately collapsed followed by pillage by Queen Gudit, after execution of Christians and ordered arson in church. While Aksum's existence extinguished, the follow-up kingdom of Zagwe likely of a continuation of its civilization and revival of Christianity, and a new multi-ethnic empire-state was formed in title of "king of kings".

The successful integration of Agaw and Semitic groups in the north prolonged over millennium and eventually forms Tigrayans and Amhara people. The Zagwe kingdom capital, relocated to Lalibela, and sparked a new cultural life. The most notable churches in this period was constructed with unique rock-hewn architecture. A dominant group, Amhara, continues to expand its territory in so-called Solomonic period after the downfall of Zagwe in 1270, and by the late 13th century, they reached to southern Shewa. Since then, centralized military unit was buildup while frequently engaged war with Sidama kingdom in the west and Muslim population to the east.

One of the most important era for Christian and Muslim insight, and the resultant of religious war was in the mid-16th century of Ethiopian–Adal War, involving the Amhara, Tigrayan and Agaw force allied to the Ethiopian Empire (Abyssinia) and the Muslim states composed mostly of Harari and Somali people, together forms the Adal Sultanate. The Oromo people additionally took an advantage of the war and occupied much the northern highland zone of the Amhara empire in the Oromo migrations.

=== Early modern period ===
The Oromo remained predominantly pastoral life who dominated the Amhara empire of Abyssinia for the rest of era. A blossom life continued throughout early modern period with the founding of capital Gondar in the early 18th century, by Emperor Fasilides, commencing a "Gondarine period".

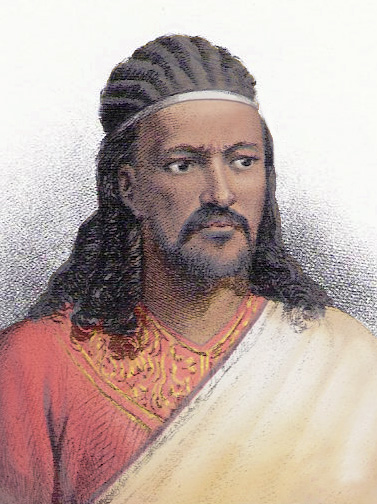
Emperor Tewodros II brought a reunification of Ethiopian state after the decentralized Zemene Mesafint era

Between 1769 and 1855, Ethiopia experienced a period of isolation referred to as the Zemene Mesafint or "Age of Princes". The Emperors became figureheads, controlled by regional lords and noblemen like Ras Mikael Sehul of Tigray, Ras Wolde Selassie of Tigray, and by the Yejju Oromo dynasty of the Wara Sheh, such as Ras Gugsa of Yejju. Prior to the Zemene Mesafint, Emperor Iyoas I had introduced the Oromo language (Afaan Oromo). In 1855, Emperor Tewodros II sought to establish permanent Ethiopian border by solidifying the Shewan kingdoms. Tewodros II is often credited with being the preliminary figure of modern Ethiopian history but his reign ended prematurely when he committed suicide during the British Expedition to Abyssinia.

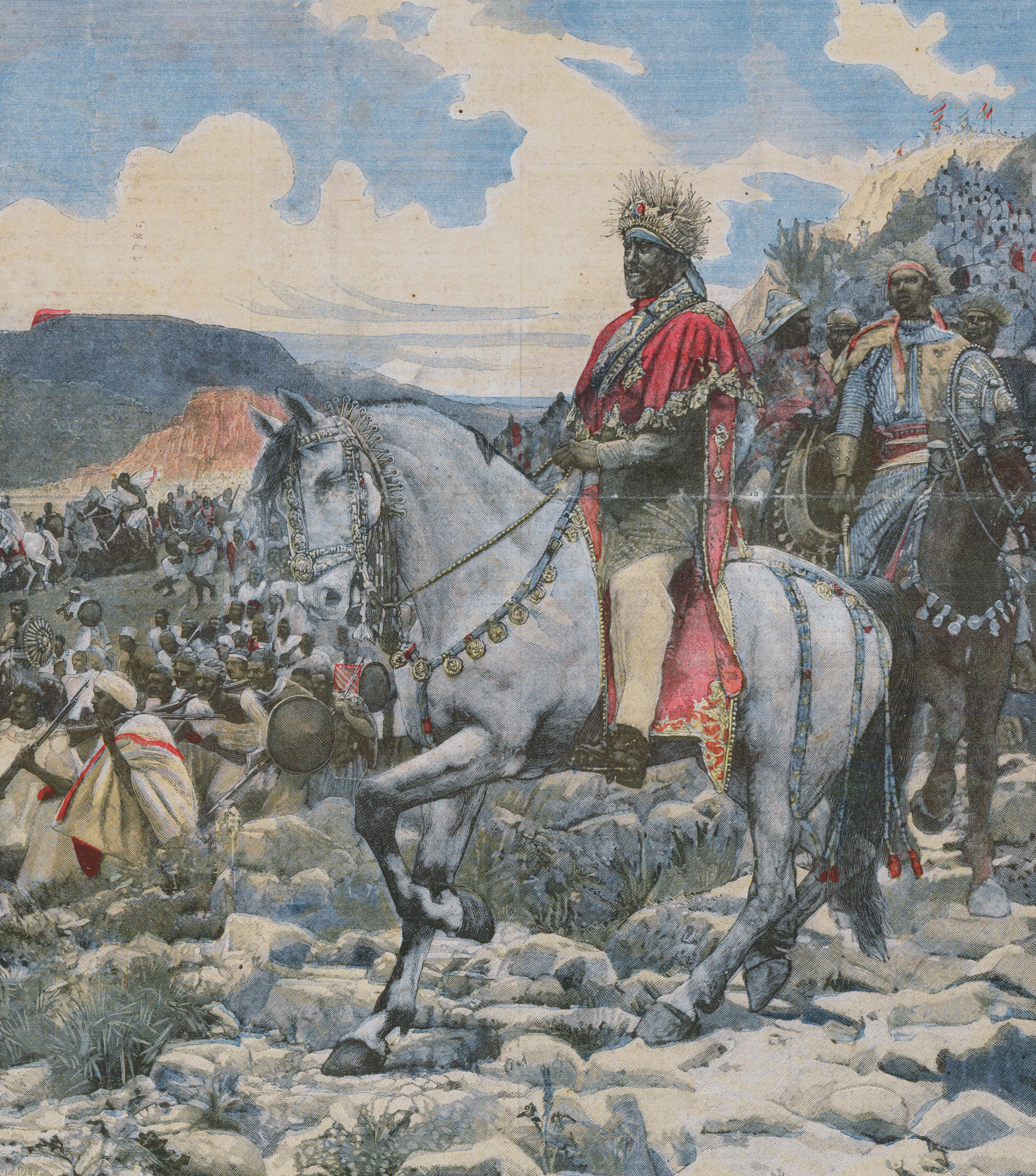
Emperor Menelik II at Battle of Adwa. The battle considered to be the basis of Ethiopian nationalism against European colonial powers

Emperor Menelik II done major reformations to the country by the late 1890s: under his reign, Menelik extensively conquered the rest of kingdoms nearby region, while annexing the Tigray Province, ultimately formed the modern border of Ethiopia. His reign brought sharp solidification of the current Ethiopian national identity. The Battle of Adwa was a 1896 colonial resistance battle between the Ethiopian Empire led by Menelik and Kingdom of Italy led by General Oreste Baratieri, involving respective 100,000 and 17,700 troops, where Ethiopian armies decisively defeated them and secured sovereignty.

The battle became a signature national pride among Ethiopians, and beyond for Pan-Africanism. The Treaty of Addis Ababa (1896) settled an end of Italo-Ethiopian War, and modern border of Ethiopia was created as a background of ceased foreign external pressure against the sovereignty of Ethiopia. Ethiopia, along with Liberia, became the only independent African survivors against the European colonization.

=== Current era ===
Flag of Federal Democratic Republic of Ethiopia, since 1995. The star insignia indicates equality between nationalities of Ethiopia.

An Italian occupation of Ethiopia following Second Italo-Ethiopian War brought legacy of ethnic marginalization of major ethnic groups: the Amharas, Oromos, Tigrayans, and Somalis. Ethiopia underwent series civil clashes under communist military junta Derg. Ethnic nationalism and similar policies implemented by the Ethiopian Peoples' Revolutionary Democratic Front (EPRDF), which brought Ethiopia to ethnic federalist state since 1995, which was aimed to reduce internal ethnic conflicts and grant freedom of choice within every ethnic groups although, Ethiopia then faced more prolong internal conflicts and ethnic clashes in the 21st century.

== Ethnicity ==
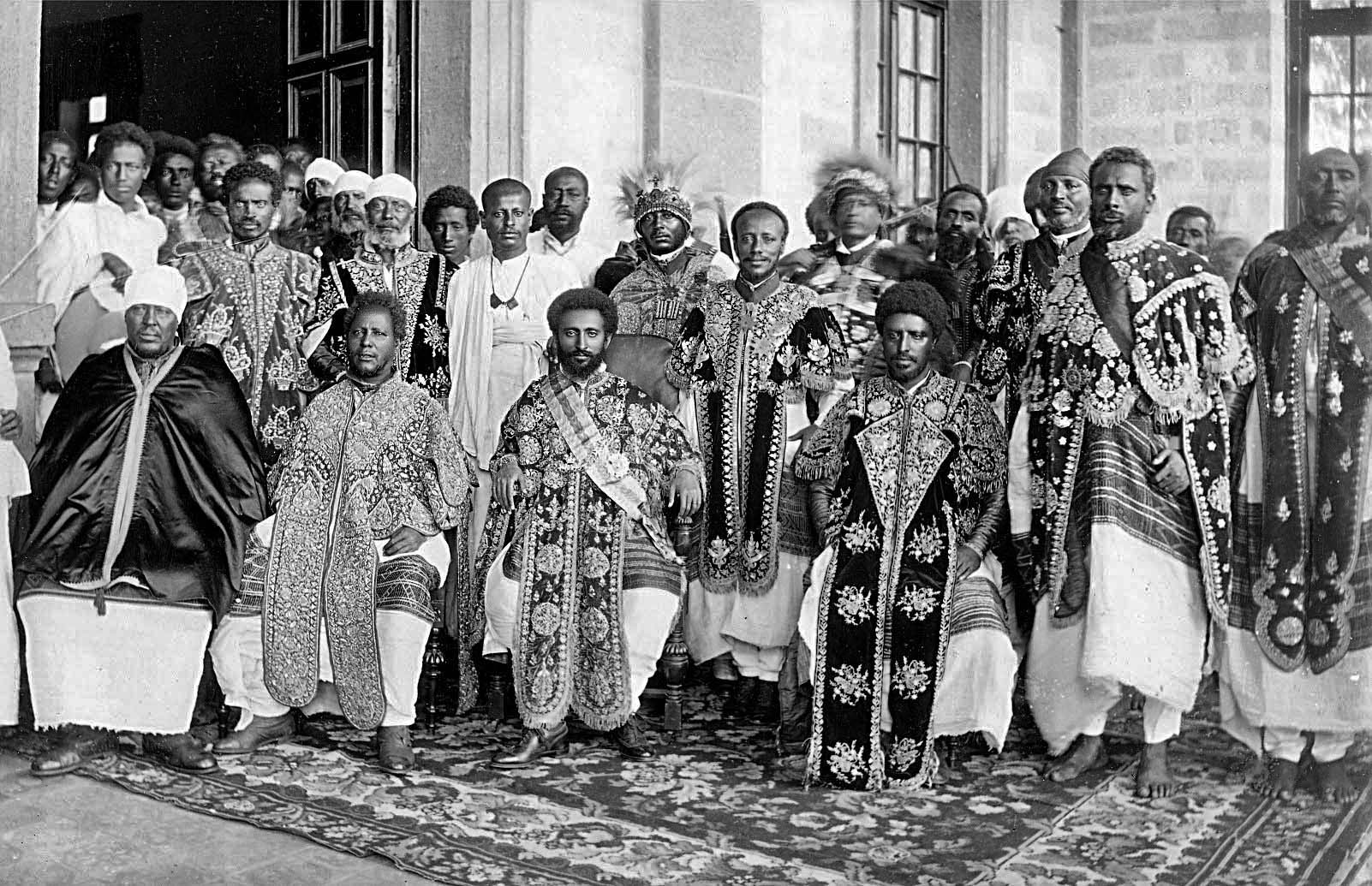
Amhara people

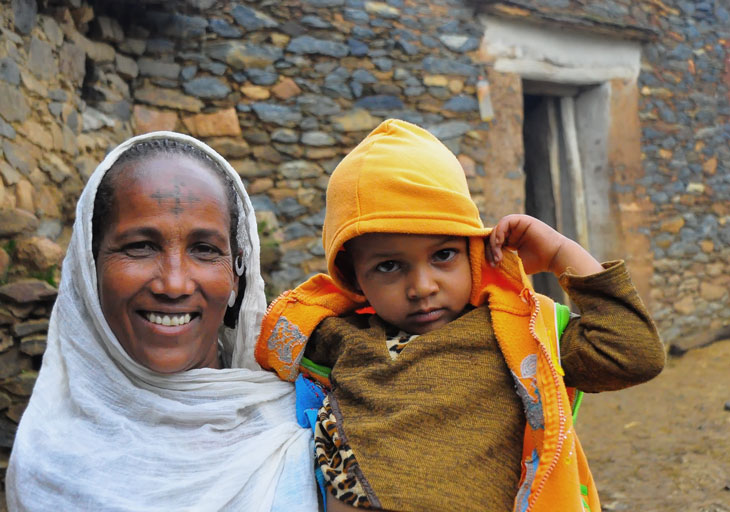
Tigrayans

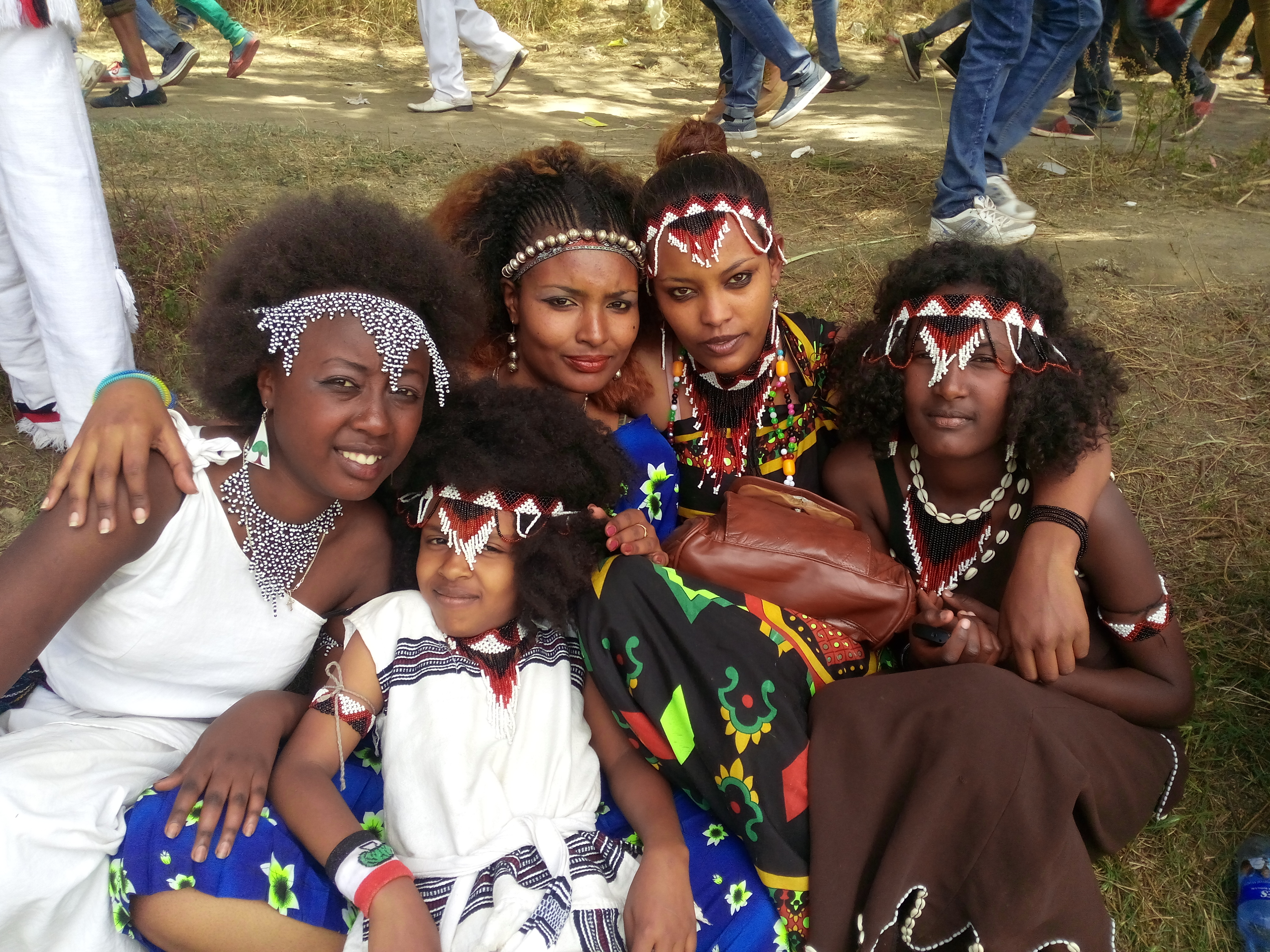
Oromo people

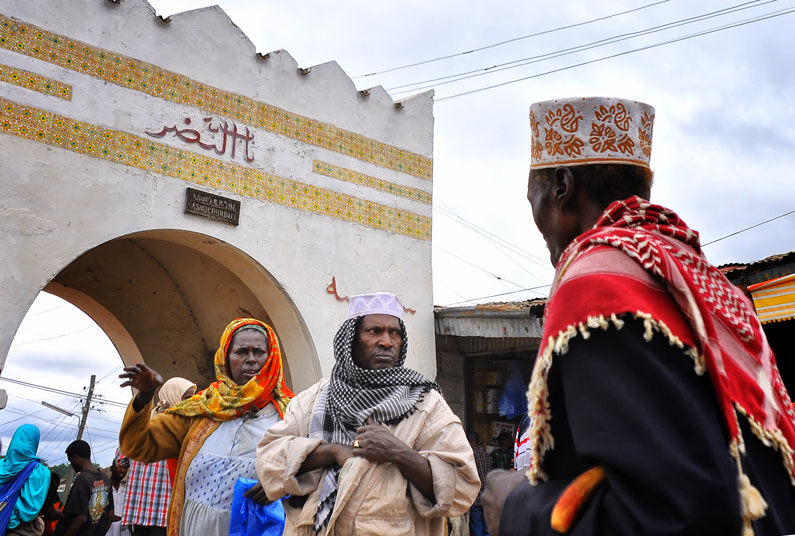
People in Harar

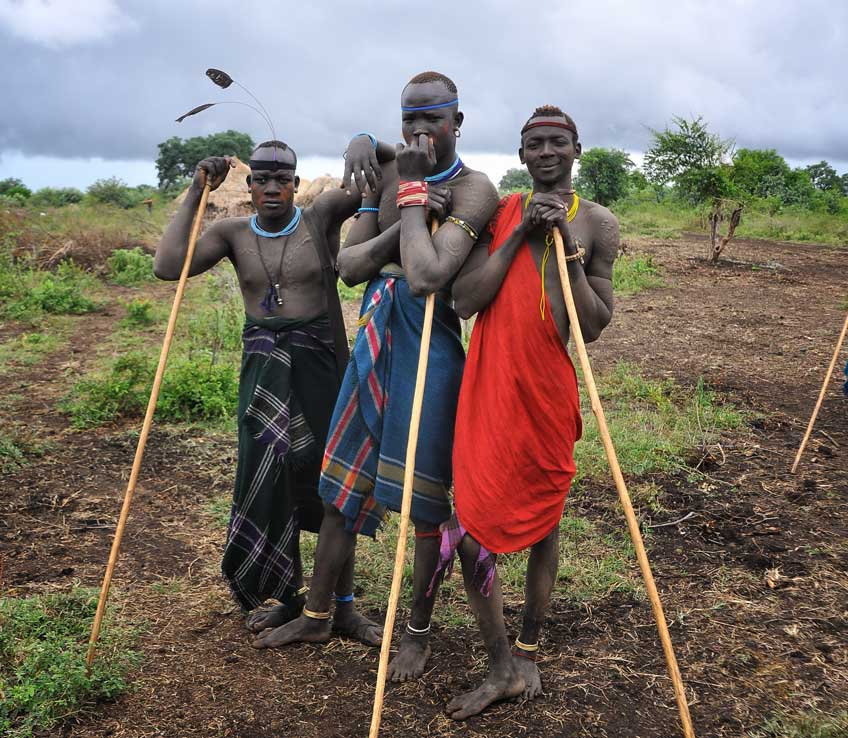
Mursi people in the South Ethiopia Regional State

=== Major ethnic groups ===
- Oromo 30.4%
- Amhara 30.0%
- Somali 6.1%
- Tigray 6.1%
- Sidama 4.0%
- Gurage 2.5%
- Welayta 2.3%
- Hadiya 1.7%
- Afar 1.7%
- Gamo 1.5%
- Other ethnic groups 12.6%

==== List ====
Ethnic group	Language family	Census (1994)		Census (2007)
Ethnic group	Language family	Number	%	Number	%
Aari	Omotic	155,002	0.29	289,835	0.39
Afar	Afro-Asiatic	979,367	1.84	1,276,374	1.73
Agaw-Awi	Afro-Asiatic	397,491	0.75	631,565	0.85
Agaw-Hamyra	Afro-Asiatic	158,231	0.30	267,851	0.36
Alaba	Afro-Asiatic	125,900	0.24	233,299	0.32
Amhara	Afro-Asiatic	18,007,933	30.13	21,878,199	29.95
Anuak	Nilotic	45,665	0.09	85,909	0.12
Arbore	Afro-Asiatic	6,559	0.01	6,840	0.01
Argobba	Afro-Asiatic	62,831	0.12	140,134	0.19
Bacha	Nilo-Saharan			2,632	< 0.01
Basketo	Omotic	51,097	0.10	78,284	0.11
Bench	Omotic	173,123	0.33	353,526	0.48
Berta	Nilo-Saharan			183,259	0.25
Bodi	Nilo-Saharan	4,686	0.01	6,994	0.01
Brayle	????			5,002	0.01
Burji	Afro-Asiatic	46,565	0.09	71,871	0.10
Bena	????			27,022	0.04
Beta Israel	Afro-Asiatic	2,321	<0.01
Chara	Omotic	6,984	0.01	13,210	0.02
Daasanach	Afro-Asiatic	32,099	0.06	48,067	0.07
Dawro	Omotic	331,483	0.62	543,148	0.74
Debase/ Gawwada	Afro-Asiatic	33,971	0.06	68,600	0.09
Dirashe	Afro-Asiatic			30,081	0.04
Dime	Omotic	6,197	0.01	891	<0.01
Dizi	Omotic	21,894	0.04	36,380	0.05
Donga	Afro-Asiatic			35,166	0.05
Fedashe	????	7,323,	0.01	3,448	< 0.01
Gamo	Omotic	719,847	1.35	1,107,163	1.50
Gebato	????	75	<0.01	1,502	< 0.01
Gedeo	Afro-Asiatic	639,905	1.20	986,977	1.34
Gedicho	????			5,483	0.01
Gidole	Afro-Asiatic	54,354	0.10	41,100	0.06
Goffa	Omotic	241,530	0.45	363,009	0.49
Gumuz	Nilo-Saharan	121,487	0.23	159,418	0.22
Gurage	Afro-Asiatic	2,290,274	4.31	1,867,377	2.53
Silt'e	Afro-Asiatic	2,290,274	4.31	940,766	1.27
Hadiya	Afro-Asiatic	927,933	1.75	1,269,382	1.72
Hamar	Omotic	42,466	0.08	46,532	0.06
Harari	Afro-Asiatic	200,000	0.04	246,000	0.04
Irob	Afro-Asiatic			33,372	0.05
Kafficho	Omotic	599,188	1.13	870,213	1.18
Kambaata	Afro-Asiatic	499,825	0.94	630,236	0.85
Konta	Omotic			83,607	0.11
Komo	Nilo-Saharan	1,526	<0.01	7,795	0.01
Konso	Afro-Asiatic	153,419	0.29	250,430	0.34
Koore	Omotic	107,595	0.20	156,983	0.21
Kontoma	Afro-Asiatic		0.4	48,543	0.05
Kunama	Nilo-Saharan	2,007	<0.01	4,860	0.01
Karo	Omotic			1,464	< 0.01
Kusumie	????			7,470	0.01
Kwegu	Nilo-Saharan			4,407	0.01
Male	Omotic	46,458	0.09	98,114	0.13
Mao	Omotic	16,236	0.03	43,535	0.06
Mareqo	Afro-Asiatic	38,096	0.07	64,381	0.09
Mashola	Afro-Asiatic			10,458	0.01
Mere people	????			14,298	0.02
Me'en	Nilo-Saharan	52,815	0.10	151,489	0.20
Messengo	????	15,341	0.03	10,964	0.01
Majangir	Nilo-Saharan			21,959	0.03
Mossiye	Afro-Asiatic	9,207	0.02	19,698	0.03
Murle	Nilo-Saharan			1,469	< 0.01
Mursi	Nilo-Saharan	3,258	0.01	7,500	0.01
Nao	Omotic	4,005	0.01	9,829	0.01
Nuer	Nilotic	64,534	0.12	147,672	0.20
Nyangatom	Nilotic	14,201	0.03	25,252	0.03
Oromo	Afro-Asiatic	21,080,318	32.15	25,489,024	34.49
Oyda	Omotic	14,075	0.03	45,149	0.06
Qebena	Afro-Asiatic	35,072	0.07	52,712	0.07
Qechem	????	2,740	0.01	2,585	< 0.01
Qewama	????	141	<0.01	298	< 0.01
She	Omotic	13,290	0.03	320	< 0.01
Shekecho	Omotic	53,897	0.10	77,678	0.11
Sheko	Omotic	23,785	0.04	37,573	0.05
Shinasha	Omotic	32,698	0.06	52,637	0.07
Shita/Upo	Nilo-Saharan	307	<0.01	1,602	< 0.01
Sidama	Afro-Asiatic	1,842,314	3.47	2,966,474	4.01
Somali	Afro-Asiatic	3,285,266	6.18	4,581,794	6.21
Surma	Nilo-Saharan	19,632	0.04	27,886	0.04
Tigrinya	Afro-Asiatic	3,284,568	6.18	4,483,892	6.07
Tembaro	????	86,510	0.16	98,621	0.13
Tsamai	Afro-Asiatic	9,702	0.02	20,046	0.03
Welayta	Omotic	1,269,216	2.39	1,707,079	2.31
Werji	Afro-Asiatic	20,536	0.04	13,232	0.02
Yem	Omotic	165,184	0.31	160,447	0.22
Zeyese	Omotic	10,842	0.02	17,884	0.02
Zelmam	Nilo-Saharan			2,704	< 0.01
Other/unknown		155,972	0.29	178,799	0.24
Somalian (Somalis of Somalia)				200,227	0.9
Sudanese		2,035	<0.01	10,333	0.01
Eritrean (Ethiopian people of Eritrean descent)		61,857	0.12	9,736	0.01
Kenyan		134	<0.01	737	<0.01
Djiboutian		367	<0.01	733	<0.01
Other foreigners				15,550	0.02
Total		53,132,276		73,750,932

=== Ethiopian diaspora ===
- Ethiopian Americans
- Ethiopian Australians
- Ethiopian Canadians
- Ethiopian Jews in Israel
- Ethiopians in Italy
- Ethiopians in the United Kingdom
- Ethiopians in Denmark
- Ethiopians in Norway
- Ethiopians in Sweden
- Eritreans
- Habesha peoples
  - Eritrean people of Ethiopian descent
  - Ethiopian people of Eritrean descent

== Languages ==
Until the fall of the Derg, Amharic served as the sole official language in government administration, courts, church and even in primary school instruction; although in the 17th century during the Zemene Mesafint under the rule of the Warasek dynasty, the Oromo language did serve as the official language of the Ethiopian Empire's royal court. After 1991, Amharic has been replaced in many areas by other official government languages such as Oromo, Somali and Tigrinya. English is the most widely spoken foreign language, and is taught in all secondary schools.

In 2007, the largest first languages were: Oromo 24,929,567 speakers or 33.8% of the total population; Amharic 21,631,370 or 29.3% (federal working language); Somali 4,609,274 or 6.2%; Tigrinya 4,324,476 or 5.9%; Sidamo 4,981,471 or 4%; Wolaytta 1,627,784 or 2.2%; Gurage 1,481,783 or 2%; and Afar 1,281,278 or 1.7%. Widely-spoken foreign languages include Arabic, English (major foreign language taught in schools), and Italian (spoken by an Italian minority).

== Religion ==
According to the CIA Factbook, the religious demography of Ethiopia is as follows; Ethiopian Orthodox 43.8%, Muslim 31.3%, Protestant 22.8%, Catholic 0.7%, traditional 0.6%, and other 0.8%.

== Diaspora ==
The largest diaspora community is found in the United States. In 2008, 250,000 Ethiopian immigrants lived in the United States. In 2011, an additional 30,000 U.S.-born citizens reported Ethiopian ancestry. According to Aaron Matteo Terrazas, "if the descendants of Ethiopian-born migrants (the second generation and up) are included, the estimates range upwards of 460,000 in the United States, of which approximately 350,000 are in the Washington, DC Metropolitan Area; 96,000 in Los Angeles; and 10,000 in New York."

A large Ethiopian community is in Israel, where Ethiopians make up almost 1.9% of the population. Almost the entire community are members of the Beta Israel community. There are large number of Ethiopian emigrants in Saudi Arabia, Italy, Lebanon, United Kingdom, Canada, Sweden and Australia..

== Genetic studies ==
=== Autosomal DNA ===
Anthropogenetic studies in 1996 were done from blood samples of Ethiopians (Amhara, Oromo, Beja and Falasha). On the projection axis, they were genetically located in an intermediate position between the cluster made by southern Arabians, Libyans and Egyptians, and the other that was formed by sub-Saharan Africans.

Wilson et al. (2001), conducted a DNA study based on cluster analysis that looked at a combined sample of Amhara and Oromo, examining a single enzyme variant: drug metabolizing enzyme (DME) loci. They found that 62% of Ethiopians fall into the same cluster of Ashkenazi Jews, Norwegians and Armenians based on that gene, and only 24% of Ethiopians cluster with Bantus and Afro-Caribbeans, 8% with Papua New Guineans, and 6% with Chinese.

An investigation by Tishkoff et al. (2009) identified fourteen ancestral population clusters which correlate with self-described ethnicity and shared cultural and/or linguistic properties within Africa, in what was the largest autosomal study of the continent at the time. The Burji, Konso and Beta Israel were sampled from Ethiopia. The Afroasiatic speaking Ethiopians sampled were cumulatively (Fig.5B) found to belong to: 71% in the "Cushitic" cluster, 6% in the "Saharan/Dogon" cluster, 5% in the "Niger Kordofanian" cluster, 3% each in the "Nilo-Saharan" and "Chadic Saharan" cluster, while the balance (12%) of their assignment was distributed among the remnant (9) Associated Ancestral Clusters (AAC's) found in Sub-Saharan Africa. The "Cushitic" cluster was also deemed "closest to the non-African AACs, consistent with an East African migration of modern humans out of Africa or a back-migration of non-Africans into Saharan areas and Eastern Africa."

Other studies conducted on Ethiopians belonging to Semitic and Cushitic ethnic groups mostly from the north of the country (Oromo, Amhara, Tigray, and Gurage), estimate approximately 40% of their autosomal ancestry to be derived from an ancient "non-African" back-migration from the Near East and about 60% to be of native African origin (from a population indigenous or "autochthonous" to the Horn of Africa). Pickrell et al. (2014) found that the West Eurasian ancestry peaks in the Amhara and Tigrayans at 49% and 50%, respectively.

Walsh, Sandra et al. (2020) which sampled 119 genome-wide-samples of Ethiopian populations similarly outlined the proportion of West Asian ancestry, their data showed that: "The masked West Asian component measures the proportion of West Asian ancestry in each population. The Amhara and Oromo populations have the highest amount (54 and 51%, respectively), Wolayta and Somali show 43 and 44%, respectively, while in contrast the Gumuz show the low amount of 0.7%. These values agree with previous estimates."

In characterizing the ancestry, Pagani, Luca et al. (2012) noted this non-African component is estimated to have entered the Horn of Africa roughly ~3,000 years ago, and was found to be similar to the populations in the Levant. The paper goes on to say that this coincides with the introduction of Ethio-Semitic languages into the region. Gallego Llorente, M et al. (2015) similarly discovered extensive admixture in Eastern Africa from a population closely related to early Neolithic farmers from the Near-East/Anatolia.

An entry by Hodgson et al. (2014) found a distinct African ancestral component in Afro-Asiatic populations in the Horn (dubbed "Ethiopic"), as well as a distinct non-African Western Eurasian component (dubbed "Ethio-Somali"), that is most likely pre-agricultural. Their data also revealed Nilo-Saharan ancestry in Afro-Asiatic populations, and "Ethiopic" ancestry in Nilo-Saharan populations, suggesting an intricate history of contact in the region. However, the Ethiopian Nilo-Saharan groups and the endogamous Aari blacksmith caste were found to have little to no Eurasian admixture. Aari blacksmiths may descend from the "Ethiopic" hunter-gatherers who were assimilated as other populations expanded into the region, or they may be a subset of a single population recently marginalized for their occupation.

According to Hollfelder et al. (2017): "The Nilotic populations have stayed largely un-admixed, which appears to be the case in Ethiopia too, where a similar observation has been made for the Gumuz, an Ethiopian Nilotic population that is genetically similar to South Sudan Nilotes. Northeast African Nilotes showed some distinction from an ancient Ethiopian individual (Mota, found in the Mota Cave in the southern Ethiopian highlands), which suggests population structure between northeast and eastern Africa already 4,500 years ago. The modern-day Nilotic groups are likely direct descendants of past populations living in northeast Africa many thousands of years ago."

López, Saioa et al. (2021) found that when comparing Ethiopians to external populations only, Nilo-Saharan speakers (as well as the Chabu, Dassanech, and Karo) in the southwest shared more recent ancestry with Bantu and Nilotic speakers, while Afro-Asiatic speakers in the northeast shared more recent ancestry with Egyptians and other West Eurasians. Overall, the study revealed that groups belonging to the Cushitic, Omotic, and Semitic branches of Afro-Asiatic in the region, still showed high genetic similarity to each other on average.

=== Paternal lineages ===
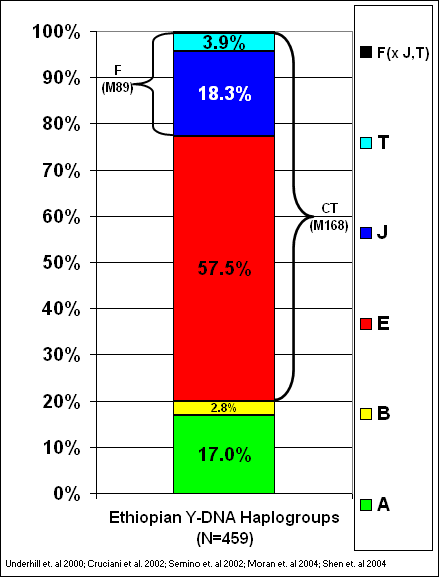
Y DNA Haplogroups of Ethiopia.

A composite look at most YDNA studies done so far reveals that, out of a total of 459 males sampled from Ethiopia, approximately 58% of Y-chromosome haplotypes were found to belong to Haplogroup E, of which 71% (41% of total) were characterized by one of its further downstream sub lineage known as E1b1b, while the remainder were mostly characterized by Haplogroup E1b1(x E1b1b,E1b1a), and to a lesser extent Haplogroup E2. With respect to E1b1b, some studies have found that it exists at its highest level among the Oromo, where it represented 62.8% of the haplotypes, while it was found at 35.4% among the Amhara.

Other studies have found an almost equal representation of Haplogroup E1b1b at approximately 57% in both the Oromo and the Amhara. The haplogroup (as its predecessor E1b1) is thought to have originated somewhere in the Horn of Africa. About one half of E1b1b found in Ethiopia is further characterized by the E1b1b1a (M78) clade, which arose later in northeast Africa (Egypt/Libya) and then subsequently back-migrated to eastern Africa.

Haplogroup J has been found at a frequency of approximately 18% in Ethiopians, but with a much higher prevalence among the Amhara, where it has been found to exist at levels as high as 35%, of which about 94% (17% of total) is of the type J1, while 6% (1% of total) is of J2 type. 26% of the individuals sampled in the Arsi control portion by Moran et al. (2004) were also found to belong to Haplogroup J. A 2010 study found that their phylogenetic clock estimates of the Haplogroup J1 in the Horn of Africa, were indirectly supported by a linguistic model for an introduction of Semitic from Arabia 2,800 years ago.

Another fairly prevalent lineage in Ethiopia belongs to Haplogroup A, occurring at a frequency of about 17% within Ethiopia, it is almost all characterized by its downstream sub lineage of A3b2 (M13). Restricted to Africa, and mostly found along the Rift Valley from Ethiopia to Cape Town, Haplogroup A represents the deepest branch in the Human Y- Chromosome phylogeny.

Haplogroup T was found at approximately 4% and Haplogroup B at approximately 3%, which make up the remainder of the Y-DNA Haplogroups found within Ethiopia.

=== Maternal lineages ===
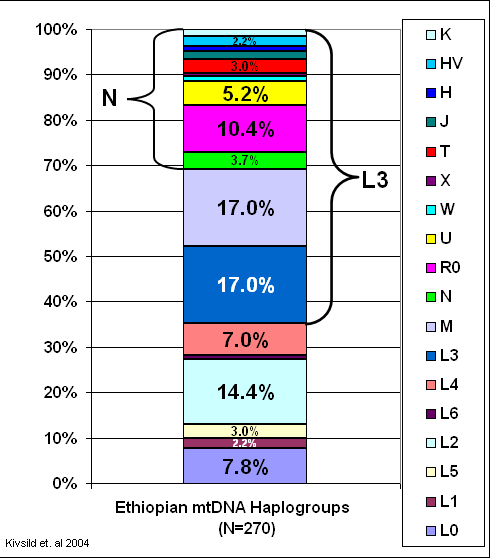
mtDNA Haplogroups of Ethiopia

The maternal ancestry of Ethiopians is similarly diverse. About half (52.2%) of Ethiopians belongs to mtdna Haplogroups L0, L1, L2, L3, L4, L5, or L6. These haplogroups are generally confined to the African continent. They also originated either in Ethiopia or very near. The other portion of the population belong to Haplogroup N (31%) and Haplogroup M1 (17%). There is controversy surrounding their origins as either native or a possible ancient back migration into Ethiopia from Asia.

Passarino et al. (1998) suggested that:

"Caucasoid" gene flow into the Ethiopian gene pool occurred predominantly through males. Conversely, the Niger–Congo contribution to the Ethiopian population occurred mainly through females.

While there is debate among the scientific community of what exactly constitutes "Caucasoid gene flow", the same study further stated:

"Indeed, Ethiopians do not seem to result only from a simple combination of proto-Niger–Congo and Middle Eastern genes. Their African component cannot be completely explained by that of present-day Niger–Congo speakers, and it is quite different from that of the Khoisan. Thus, a portion of the current Ethiopian gene pool may be the product of in situ differentiation from an ancestral gene pool."

Scott et al. (2005) similarly observed that the Ethiopian population is almost equally divided between individuals that carry Eurasian maternal lineages, and those that belong to African clades. They describe the presence of Eurasian clades in the country as sequences that "are thought to be found in high numbers in Ethiopia either as a result of substantial gene flow into Ethiopia from Eurasia (Chen et al., 2000; Richards et al., 2003), or as a result of having undergone several branching events in demic diffusion, acting as founder lineages for non-African populations". The researchers further found no association between regional origin of subjects or language family (Semitic/Cushitic) and their mitochondrial type:

The haplogroup distribution amongst all subjects (athletes and controls) from different geographical regions of Ethiopia is displayed in Table 3. As can be seen graphically in Fig. 3, the mtDNA haplogroup distribution of each region is similar, with all regions displaying similar proportions of African 'L' haplogroups (Addis Ababa: 59%, Arsi: 50%, Shewa: 44%, Other: 57%). No association was found between regional origin of subjects and their mitochondrial type (v2=8.5, 15 df, P=0.9). Similarly, the mtDNA haplogroup distribution of subjects (athletes and controls) speaking languages from each family is shown in Table 3. Again there was no association between language family and mitochondrial type (v2=5.4, 5 df, P=0.37). As can be seen in Fig. 4, the haplogroup distributions of each language family are again very similar.

Musilová et al. (2011) observed significant maternal ties between its Ethiopian and other Horn African samples with its Western Asian samples; particularly in terms of the HV1b mtDNA haplogroup. The authors noted:

"Detailed phylogeography of HV1 sequences shows that more recent demographic upheavals likely contributed to their spread from West Arabia to East Africa, a finding concordant with archaeological records suggesting intensive maritime trade in the Red Sea from the sixth millennium BC onwards."

According to Černý et al. (2008), many Ethiopians also share specific maternal lineages with areas in Yemen and other parts of Northeast Africa. The authors indicate that:

"The most frequent haplotype in west coastal Yemen is 16126–16362, which is found not only in the Ethiopian highlands but also in Somalia, lower Egypt and at especially high frequency in the Nubians. The Tihama share some West Eurasian haplotypes with Africans, e.g. J and K with Ethiopians, Somali and Egyptians."

Schuenemann V. J et al. (2017) found that when it came to the maternal background of 125 Ethiopians, over >60% was composed of African L lineages, while these lineages were up to 20% for the 100 Modern Egyptians.

== See also ==
- Demographics of Ethiopia
- Ethnic groups in Ethiopia
- Government of Ethiopia
- Regions of Ethiopia
