= Aida Girma-Melaku =

UNICEF representative

UNICEF representative in Pakistan
- Incumbent
- Assumed office April 2018

Personal details
- Born: Ethiopia
- Profession: UNO, UNICEF Pakistan

Emblem of the United Nations

Aida Girma-Melaku, born in Ethiopia and a naturalized citizen of Italy, is a writer and the representative of UNICEF in Pakistan.

== Life ==
Girma-Melaku was born in Ethiopia and became a citizen of Italy. Girma-Melaku was educated at Southern New Hampshire University, where she obtained an M.Sc. in Development Economics after a B.Sc. in International Development. She also took a course at Harvard. Girma-Melaku was a UNICEF representative for fourteen years in Uganda, South Africa and Malawi. She remained associated with UNICEF as Deputy Representative of UNICEF in Mozambique and Somalia.

On 12 April 2018 she presented her credentials to Khawaja Muhammad Asif, the Foreign Minister of Pakistan, as the new UNICEF representative.

== Contributions ==
Girma-Melaku speaks on different welfare projects and writes articles to highlight women's problems.
