= Ethiopia–Italy relations =

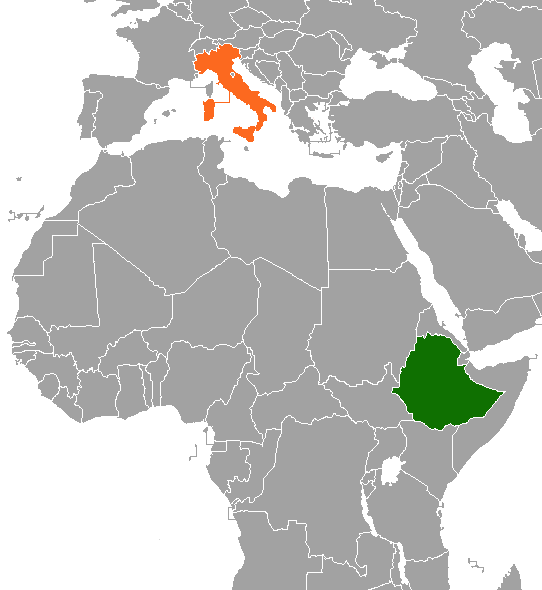

- Ethiopia: Italy

Ethiopia–Italy relations are the current and historical relations between Ethiopia and Italy.

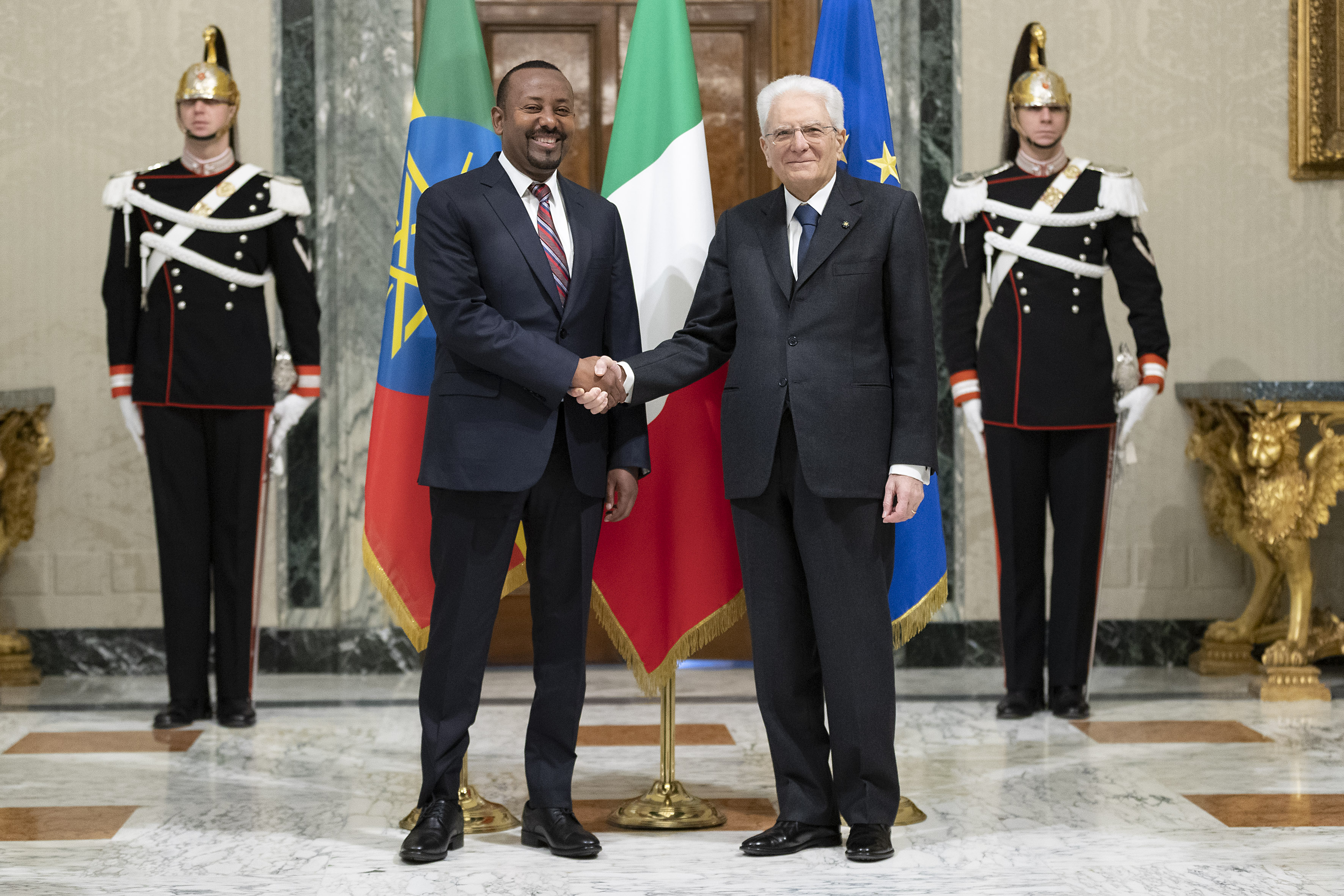
Ethiopian Prime Minister Abiy Ahmed with Italian President Sergio Mattarella on February 2023

== History ==
Modern Italian colonial ambitions into Ethiopia began in the 1880s. This was eventually followed by the Italo-Ethiopian War of 1887–1889, in which Italy occupied the Ethiopian territory in present-day Eritrea, founding the colony of Italian Eritrea. Years later, the disputed Treaty of Wuchale led to the First Italo-Ethiopian War between 1894 and 1896, where the Ethiopians (supported by Russia and France) successfully fought off European expansion. The peace of Addis Ababa after the defeat of the Italian troops in Adua in 1896, was the beginning of the Ethiopian independence. The Ethiopian territory included the territory conquered by Menelik II and the borders were agreed with the major regional powers: France, Great Britain and Egypt. Moreover, a series of Treaties regulated the relations with Italy, which established the borders between Ethiopia and Eritrea as well as Somalia. However, some territories belonged to Somalia for an ethnic reason, so the fact that Ethiopia had occupied and incorporated them caused tensions in the regional relations. The emperor Haile Selassie, who was the crown prince since 1916 and succeeded to the throne in 1930, strengthened the international legitimisation of Ethiopia, by implementing an open-door policy, which was established with the entry in the League of the Nations of Ethiopia in 1923.

Following World War I and the rise of Italian Fascism, the Abyssinia Crisis began, and eventually culminated in the 1935–1936 Second Italo-Ethiopian War. Ethiopia was invaded in 1935 by the Italian troops, who reached Addis Ababa on 5 May 1936. It was a brutal conflict: the Ethiopians used prohibited Dum-dum bullets and began mutilating captured soldiers (often with castration) since the first weeks of war, while the Italians used chemical warfare. Ethiopia lost its independence and became Italian Ethiopia, part of Italian East Africa. During the period of the Italian occupation, Ethiopia was divided into six regions: Eritrea which expanded in part of Tigray Region, Amhara Region (Begemder, Wallo, Gojjam and northern Scioa), Galla-Sidamo, Addis Ababa, Harar and Somalia, which included the Ogaden region. The territorial breakdown was aimed at reducing and controlling the hegemonic power of Amhara people, by using the autonomist tendencies of the other regions. The Italian occupation was characterised by investments in infrastructures aimed to establish a future agricultural and entrepreneurial colonisation.

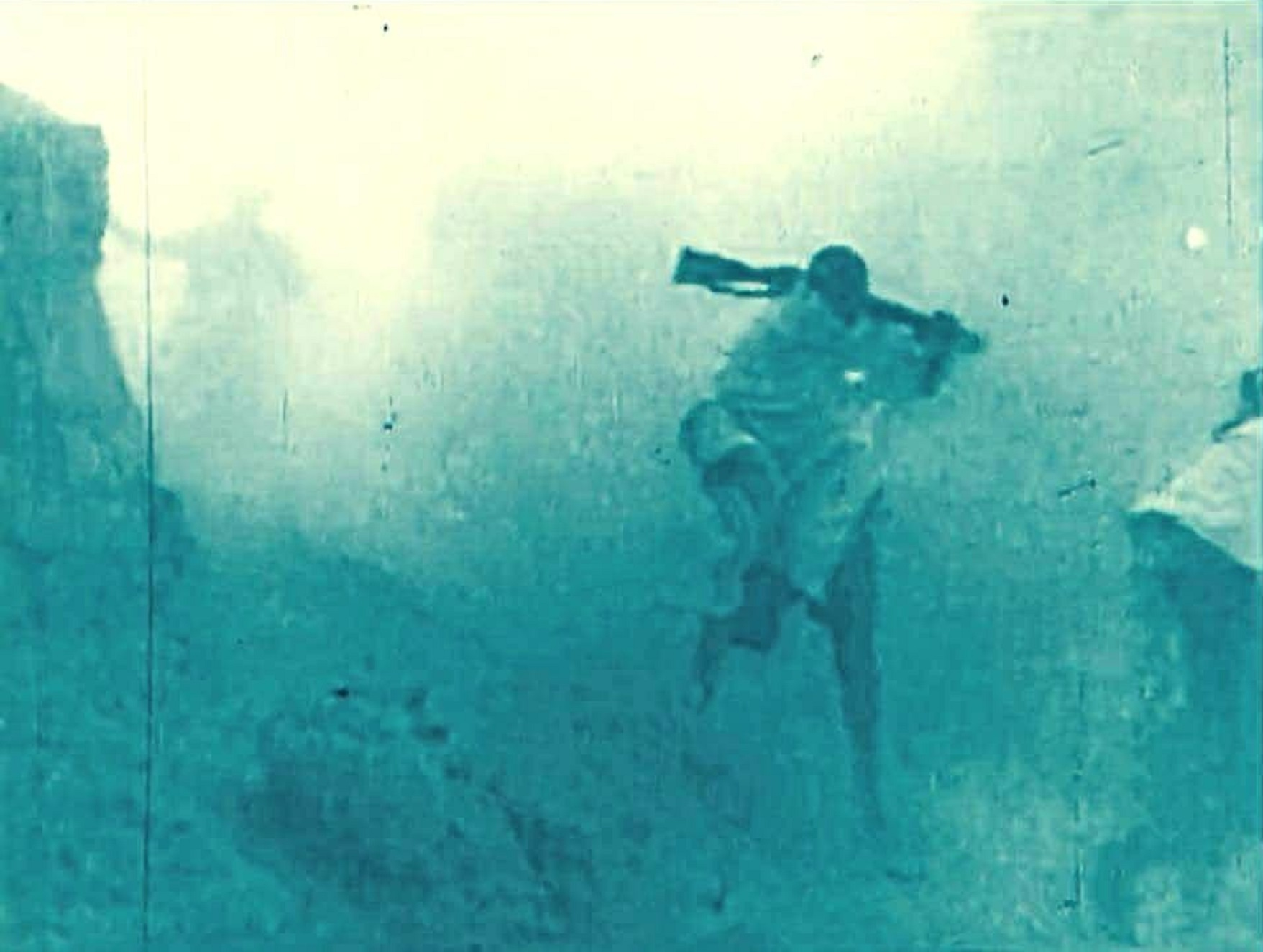
Second Italo-Ethiopian War bombing with mustard gas

Italy eventually lost its colonies in the region. Following years of local resistance and the intervention of British troops during the East African Campaign of World War II, scattered Italian forces continued to fight in a guerrilla war, until the final surrender in 1943. Ethiopia regained its independence from Italy in 1947.

After independence, many Italian settlers remained for decades after receiving full pardon by Emperor Selassie. However, due to the Ethiopian Civil War in 1974, nearly 22,000 Italo-Ethiopians left the country.

== Education ==
Ethiopia has the largest concentration of Italian schools and cultural institutes in Africa (such as the Scuola Statale Italiana of Addis Abeba), which foster and promote Italian and Ethiopian culture and are free to the public.

== Economy ==
The Italian firm Salini Costruttori was chosen by the Ethiopian government to design and build the Millennium or Renaissance Dam on the Blue Nile river, which when completed will be the largest dam and hydroelectric plant in Africa. As the Italian engineers had helped to build the first railway from Addis to Djibouti in the past, the Ethiopian government has contracted them again to expand the railroad network along with India and China.

For the last 20 years, Italy has continued to be among the top 5 trading partners with Ethiopia and a major investor in the Ethiopian economy.

All imports from Ethiopia to Italy are duty-free and quota-free, with the exception of armaments, as part of the Everything but Arms initiative of the European Union.

== Cooperation ==
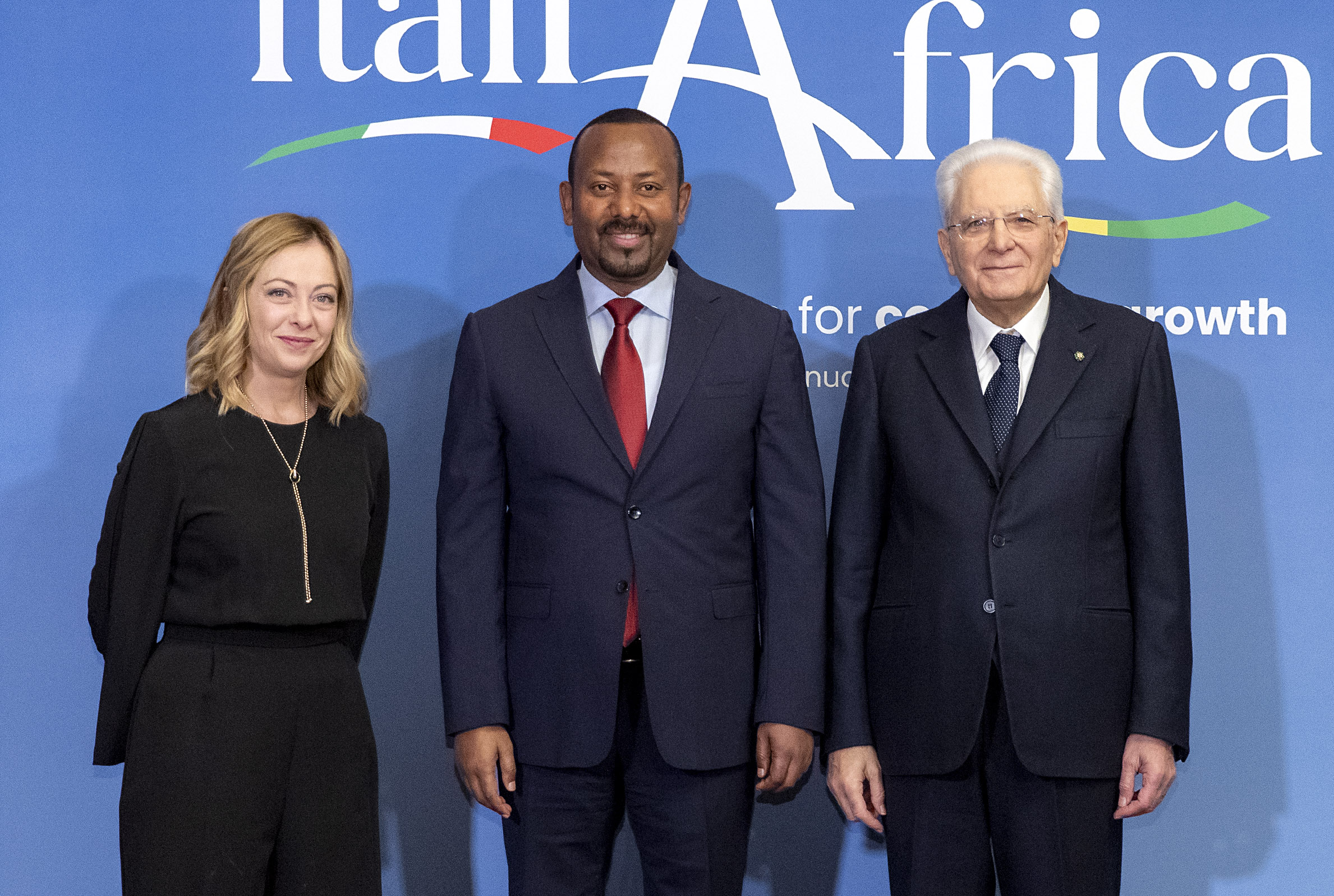
Italian Prime Minister Giorgia Meloni and President Sergio Mattarella with Ethiopian Prime Minister Abiy Ahmed at the 2024 Italy-Africa Summit in Rome

The relations between Ethiopia and Italy in the field of political, security and economic cooperation have been good in recent years. In 2015, the at the time foreign minister Paolo Gentiloni and Prime minister visited Addis Ababa on a state visit. This was proceeded by another visit in 2016 by the President of the Republic, Sergio Mattarella. Ethiopia has been one of the biggest beneficiaries of Italian initiatives in Africa.

Currently, Italy ranks among Ethiopia's top trade partners, eighth supplier at global level, first at European level (in the first months of 2018), in fact many Italian companies are involved in the current work of modernisation of Ethiopia, while as far as Italian Export is concerned, Ethiopia ranks fourth as destination market in Sub-Saharan Africa.

On 10 April 2019, an important agreement between the Government of the Italian Republic and the Government of the Federal Democratic Republic of Ethiopia, focused on cooperation in the defence sector, was concluded in Addis Ababa, entitled: "Ratification and implementation of the Agreement between the Government of the Italian Republic and the Government of the Federal Democratic Republic of Ethiopia on cooperation in the field of defence, done at Addis Ababa on 10 april 2019".

Federal Democratic Republic of Ethiopia on cooperation in the field of defence, done at Addis Ababa on 10 April 2019" on Government initiative (in Italian language "Accordo tra il Governo della Repubblica italiana e il Governo della Repubblica democratica federale di Etiopia sulla cooperazione nel settore della difesa").

During her official visit to Ethiopia, Italian Prime Minister Giorgia Meloni was greeted by jubilant crowds, some wearing T-shirts emblazoned with her face, as she walked through the streets to a reception ceremony in Addis Ababa.

=== Content of the Agreement ===
The ratification of the agreement initialled in 2019 between the Government of the Republic of Italy and the Government of the Federal Democratic Republic of Ethiopia on cooperation in the field of defence consists of four articles, the first two authorising ratification and ordering the Agreement.

Article 3 deals with the coverage of charges attributable to the provisions of Article 4 which is dedicated to the modalities of cooperation, which provided:

- exchange of visits and experience
- reciprocal participation in courses, conferences, studies, apprenticeships, training as well as
- symposia organised by military education and training institutions;
- promotion of knowledge and skills, in accordance with national and international law, related to defence
- law, related to defence issues;
- peace support operations;
- promotion of military health services, including medical research;
- support to commercial initiatives, relating to defence products and services related to defence
- defence issues;
- other areas of common interest to the Parties.

== Resident diplomatic missions ==
- Ethiopia has an embassy in Rome.
- Italy has an embassy in Addis Ababa.

== See also ==
- Italian Ethiopia
- Foreign relations of Ethiopia
- Italians of Ethiopia
- Foreign relations of Italy
- Italian East Africa
- Ethiopians in Italy
