= Ethiopian diaspora =

Ethiopians living aboard

Ethiopians in the world

There are over 2.5 million Ethiopians abroad, primarily inhabited in North America, Europe, the Middle East and Australia. In the U.S., there are 250,000 to 460,000 diasporans, and 16,347 in the Netherlands according to the Dutch Central Statistics Agency. Ethiopian diaspora play important roles in various fields, including politics, business and culture, and have been instrumental in the promotion of Ethiopian culture and heritage aboard. In South Africa, Ethiopians migrants are estimated to be about 120,000 people, affecting the status of South Africa's economic space in townships, rural areas, and in select central business districts across the country. Meanwhile, they face challenges relating to xenophobia and racism in South Africa, particularly in the post-apartheid society. More than 90% of Ethiopian immigrants arrived in the country irregularly, and are considered by the South African government as undocumented migrants.

Due to political turmoil and recurring natural disasters, Ethiopians have also migrated to Kenya, Sudan, and other neighbouring countries. During the brutal Tigray War, as many as 600,000 people were killed and nearly 3 million displaced both internally and in fleeing abroad.

== History ==
The history of Ethiopian diaspora is rooted during the start of diplomatic relations between the government of Ethiopia and the US government in 1903. The US sent a delegation, the Skinner Mission, to Ethiopia by which Emperor Menelik II signed trade deals with the US, while expressing his interest of sending students to the US. The first student was Melaku Beyan. Afterward, the US became major destination to Ethiopian students while also financed by Haile Selassie's government. Haile Selassie's modernization expanded military academies, high-accrediting colleges and civil societies in Ethiopia.

Although Haile Selassie sent many Ethiopian students to different countries, a majority of them were located in the US. Between 1953 and 1974, 4,000 Ethiopian military officers were trained in the US while there was also 2,000 civilians in the US. According to Bahiru Zewde, while the Ethiopian Air Force benefited the American interest, there was no institutions, civilian or military, that does not have America’s mark. After the 1960 coup attempt, the Ethiopian Student Movement (ESM) was formed which established its branches in Europe and North America. By 1969, the ESM in Europe and North America showed solidarity with ESM and began seizing Ethiopian embassies to take officials hostage. Notable incidents was occurred in July 1969 when Haile Selassie conducted state visit to the US from 7 to 10 July. After the Ethiopian Revolution and the Derg came to power in 1974, those students supported the regime of cementing "feudalism" and began forming the All-Ethiopia Socialist Movement (AESM) while students in the Ethiopian People’s Revolutionary Party (EPRP) opposed it.

The bloody EPRP mass killings and rebellion as well as the Eritrean and Somali aggressions toward the regime led the Derg to launch the Red Terror in 1976; many student revolutionaries were badly harmed and fled to Europe and North America via Sudan, Kenya, and Djibouti. Those who have family aboard helped them to leave the country. In addition, the US also aided the Beta Israel community in Ethiopia to emigrate to Israel and also provided shelter to Ethiopian refugees in Sudan. 24,000 of them were benefited to live in the US in accordance with the 1980 US Refugee Act. Educated academic individuals, illiterate peasants, former government officials and military officers were living in the US to the decade.

After the fall of the Derg, the EPRDF regime saw the return of diaspora Ethiopians to their homeland. The government also encouraged them to invest the country. In 2007, Prime Minister Meles Zenawi warmly welcomed the diaspora community to celebrate the Ethiopian third millennium.

== See also ==
- Ethiopians in the United States
- Ethiopians in Australia
- Ethiopian Jews in Israel
- Ethiopians in the United Kingdom
