= UNICEF Pakistan =

UNICEF Pakistan Country Office

- Abbreviation: UNICEF Pakistan
- Type: Intergovernmental organisation (IGO)
- Legal status: Active
- Headquarters: Islamabad, Pakistan
- Parent organization: UNICEF
- Website: unicef.org/pakistan

UNICEF Pakistan is one of country offices of UNICEF. It works for the rights of children in Pakistan, including their right to education, healthcare and protection from abuse and exploitation. The national office falls under the UNICEF ROSA.

UNICEF Pakistan works with the Ministry of Social Welfare and Special Education, Government of Pakistan, Ministry of Parliamentary Affairs, Provincial Social Welfare Departments, NGOs, and other UN agencies to protect children from abuse, exploitation, violence, and discrimination.

== Convention on the Rights of the Child ==
The 1989 United Nations Convention on the Rights of the Child is a comprehensive human rights treaty which enshrines specific children’s rights in international law. These rights define universal principles and standards for the status and treatment of children worldwide.

The Convention spells out a specific role for UNICEF, in its capacity as the UN body responsible for the rights of children. UNICEF is required to promote the effective implementation of the Convention and to encourage international cooperation for the benefit of children. UNICEF is also entitled to be represented when each country’s implementation of the Convention is considered by the Committee every five years.
