= Yngve A. A. Larsson =

Swedish pediatrician, diabetologist and medicine professor (1917–2014)

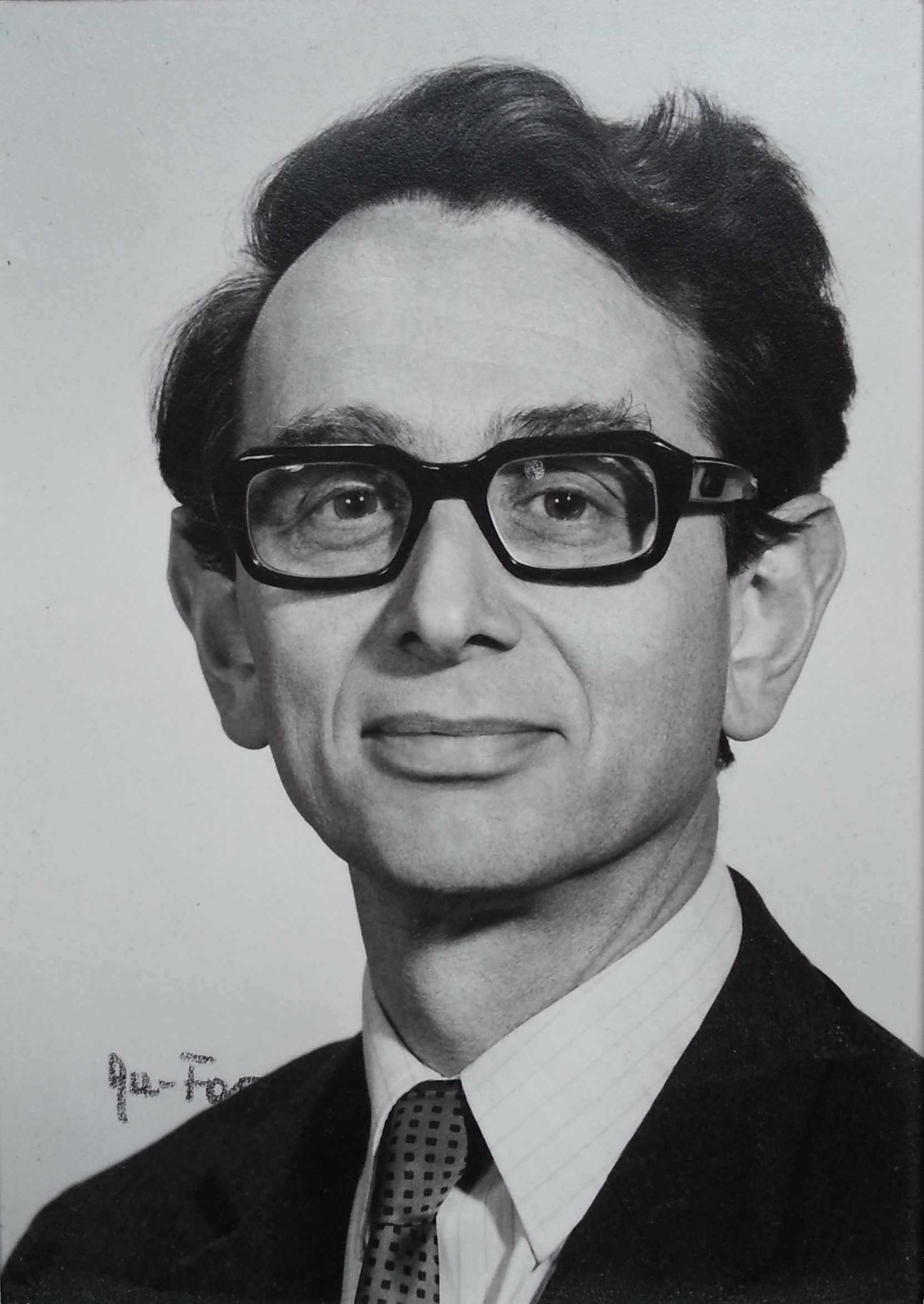
- Professor Yngve Larsson
- Born: 9 January 1917; Stockholm, Sweden
- Died: 22 March 2014 (aged 97); Stockholm, Sweden
- Education: Ph.D.
- Occupations: pediatrician, diabetologist, medicine professor

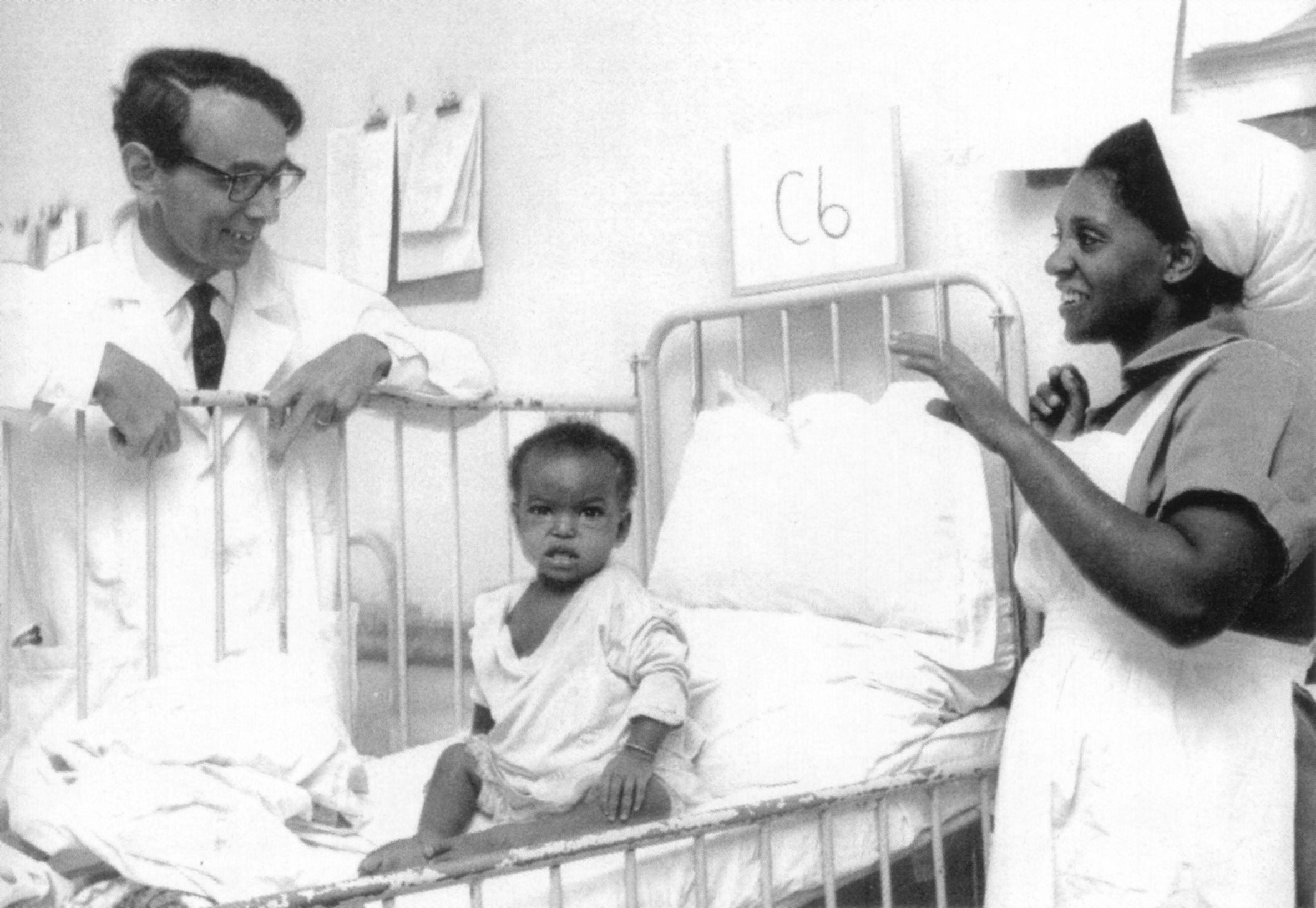
Yngve Larsson at the Ethio-Swedish Pediatric Clinic (ESPC) in Addis Abeba.

Yngve Axel Andreas Larsson (9 January 1917 – 22 March 2014) was a Swedish pediatrician, medicine professor and diabetologist. He worked for the Swedish International Development Cooperation Agency in Addis Abeba, Ethiopia. Later he worked in Linköping, Sweden, where he was in charge of diabetology at Linköping University. Larsson was a member of the Advisory Council for the International Society for Pediatric and Adolescent Diabetes, and worked for several years for the Swedish National Board of Health and Welfare.

== Life ==
Yngve Larsson was the fifth child of Stockholm vice mayor Yngve Larsson and Elin Larsson (daughter of publisher Karl Otto Bonnier). He graduated from Uppsala University in 1938 and gained his Ph.D. at Karolinska Institute in 1956. From 1964 he worked for Swedish International Development Cooperation Agency in Addis Abeba, Ethiopia, first as a professor and 1965–1970 as director of the Ethio-Swedish Pediatric Clinic (ESPC) at Haile Selassie I University. In parallel, his wife pediatrician Ulla Larsson established the Lideta Maternal and Child Health Center (or Lideta MCH Clinic) nearby with financing from the Swedish branch of Save the Children. In the 1970s Yngve Larsson worked in Linköping, Sweden, in charge of diabetology at Linköping University and initiating national research in the field.

Yngve Larsson was active in the International Society for Pediatric and Adolescent Diabetes (ISPAD) from its first year, and was a member of its Advisory Council in 1981–1984. After retiring in 1983, he worked within Swedish National Board of Health and Welfare for several years.

Larsson died from natural causes on 22 March 2014 in Lidingö. He was 97 years old.
