= Ethiopia–Norway relations =

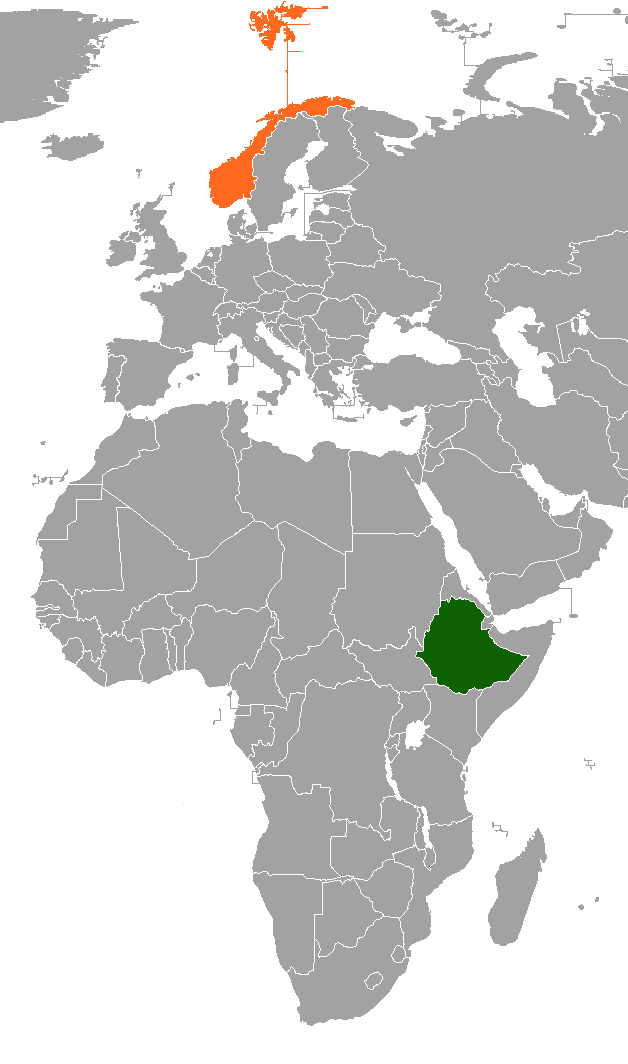

- Ethiopia: Norway

Ethiopia–Norway relations refers to the bilateral relations between Ethiopia and Norway. Norway has an embassy in Addis Abeba since 1991, whereas Ethiopia has a non resident ambassador in Stockholm.

The two countries' relationship dates back to the 1950s, and mainly started because Evangelical-Lutheran missionaries saw to Ethiopia as a field of mission. The Norwegian Missionary Society, Norwegian Lutheran Mission and the Free Church of Norway were involved. From 1955 to 1965, efforts took place to develop the Ethiopian Navy.

Norway opened its embassy in Addis Abeba in 1991, and in 1995 Norway bestowed the status as prioritized country for development aid upon Ethiopia. Norway condemned the Eritrean–Ethiopian War of 1998, also putting future bilateral agreements with Ethiopia on hold.

In 2017, Ethiopian Airlines flights were inaugurated between Oslo and Addis Ababa. In 2019, a Norwegian parliamentary delegation visited Ethiopia, touring schools, democracy forums, and the country's forest restoration program. Furor over human rights abuses have colored the nations' relationship in recent years.

Previous Ethiopian ambassadors to Norway include Berhanu Kebede; previous Norwegian ambassadors to Ethiopia include Peter Martin Anker, Paal Bog, Mette Ravn.

Culturally, parts of the Ethiopian diaspora in Norway has been known to celebrate Ethiopian runners at the Bislett Games.

== See also ==
- Foreign relations of Ethiopia
- Foreign relations of Norway
