= Ethiopians in the United Kingdom =

Ethiopian diaspora in the United Kingdom

Total population
- Ethiopian-born residents 15,494 (2011 Census)

Regions with significant populations
- Primarily; London

Languages
- English, Amharic, Oromo, Tigrinya, Gurage, Sidamo, others

Religion
- Predominantly; Christianity and Islam (including Ethiopian Orthodox and Protestant), Judaism; Others; Traditional beliefs

Ethiopians in the United Kingdom are a national group that consist of Ethiopian immigrants to the United Kingdom as well as their descendants.

== History ==
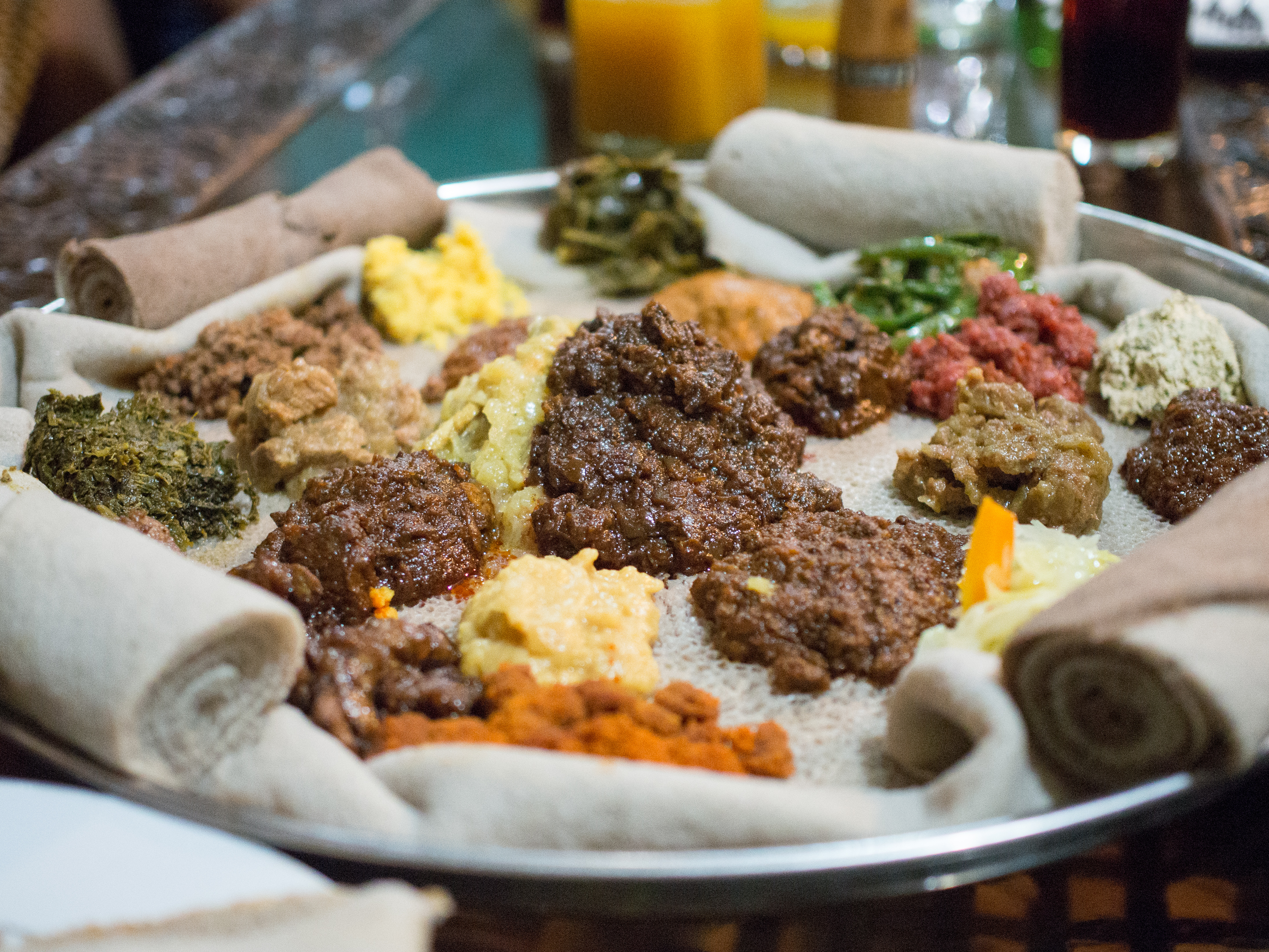
Injera is an Ethiopian dish that has become increasingly popular in the UK through the Ethiopian British community

The first wave of Ethiopian immigrants to the UK occurred in 1974, when many were forced from their homes when Haile Selassie's government was overthrown by the military junta, Derg. Many of these were political refugees who left behind high paid and respectable jobs. The second, larger wave of Ethiopians to the UK was in 1991, when Ethiopians of all walks of life claimed asylum in the UK. Another civil war 1998 in the country, and continuous political unrest even today means that more and more Ethiopians are leaving their homeland to seek better lives abroad. Prior to the civil wars, Ethiopians were free to come to the UK to study, many of whom stayed and are undoubtedly amongst the thousands who now form an ageing population. The Ethiopian community in the UK is now an extremely well integrated group that consists of many generations.

== Demographics ==
The 2001 Census recorded 6,561 Ethiopian-born people residing in the UK. According to the 2011 UK Census, there were 15,058 Ethiopian-born residents in England, 151 in Wales, 258 in Scotland, and 27 in Northern Ireland. Of this total of 15,494 Ethiopian-born residents, 10,517 lived in Greater London.

== Community and culture ==
There are now many Ethiopian churches set up across London, including St Mary's Ethiopian Orthodox Church in Battersea Park. There are also an increasing number of Ethiopian restaurants in the UK, where Ethiopian cuisine such as injera is served.

There is also a community centre, named Ethiopian Community in Britain, based in West Hampstead, London.

== Notable individuals ==
- Dr.Awol Allo- a senior lecturer in law at the University of Keele.
- Prince Alemayehu- the son of Emperor Tewodros II of Ethiopia
- Lemn Sissay- The poet and Chancellor of the University of Manchester, also of Ethiopian ancestry.

== See also ==
- Anglo-Ethiopian Society
- African migration to the United Kingdom
- Demographics of Ethiopia
- Ethiopian American
- Ethiopian Australian
- Ethiopian Jews in Israel
- People of Ethiopia
- Somalis in the United Kingdom
