= Ethiopians in Denmark =

Ethiopian diaspora in Denmark

Total population
- 1,876

Regions with significant populations
- Copenhagen, Aarhus, Herlev, Gladsaxe, Odense

Languages
- Amharic, Oromo, Tigrinya, Danish

Religion
- Ethiopian Orthodox Tewahedo Church, Islam

Ethiopians in Denmark are citizens and residents of Denmark who are of Ethiopian descent. According to Statistics Denmark, as of 2017, there are a total 1,876 persons of Ethiopian origin living in Denmark. Of those individuals, 1,267 are Ethiopia-born immigrants and 609 are descendants of Ethiopia-born persons.

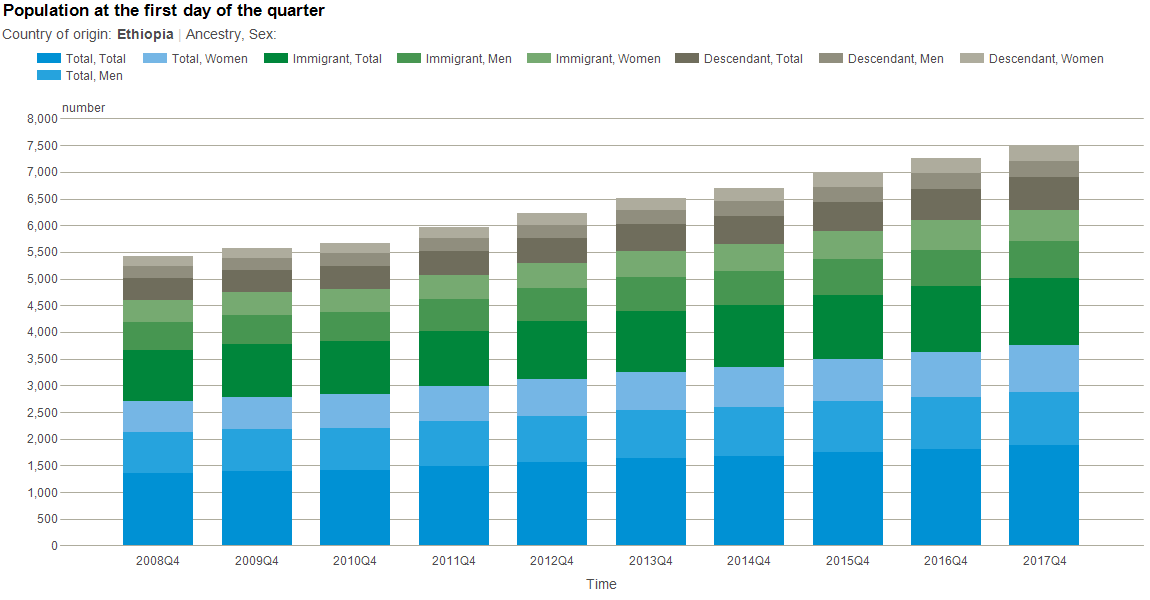
Population of Ethiopian origin in Denmark by sex, yearly fourth quarter 2008-2017 (Statistics Denmark).

764 individuals are citizens of Ethiopia (403 men, 361 women). As of 2016, a total of 33 Ethiopia-born persons have been granted residence permits in Denmark for family reunification, 18 for asylum, 41 for study, 46 for work, 1 for EU/EEA residing family members, and 2 for other reasons.

Ethiopian residents are generally young, with most belonging to the 30–34 years (233 individuals), 25–29 years (211 individuals), 0–4 years (181 individuals), 20–24 years (157 individuals), and 15–19 years (155 individuals) age groups. They primarily inhabit the regions of Hovedstaden (1,057), Midtjylland (380), Syddanmark (288), Sjælland (85), and Nordjylland (66), and the cities of Copenhagen (635), Aarhus (260), Herlev (80), Gladsaxe (68), and Odense (65).

== See also ==
- Denmark–Ethiopia relations
- Demographics of Ethiopia
- Immigration to Denmark
