= Anti-Ethiopian sentiment =

Prejudice, discrimination and hostility against Ethiopia, its people and government

Ethiopians in the world

Anti-Ethiopian sentiment, also known as Ethiophobia, refers to prejudice, discrimination, or hostility directed against Ethiopia, its people, and the Ethiopian diaspora. Externally, it encompasses xenophobic attitudes toward Ethiopians. Internally, it includes a hostility or rejection of Ethiopian national identity. Broader definitions may include hostility toward the Ethiopian government, criticism of Ethiopian state policies when framed through ethnic or national biases and conflicts between the central state and various Ethiopian ethnic groups, including the country's four largest populations: the Oromo, Amhara, Somali, and Tigrayans.

The phenomenon has appeared in various contexts, including discrimination against Ethiopian Jews in Israel, Italian colonial aggression against Ethiopia, regional conflicts with neighboring states such as Eritrea and Somalia, tensions with Egypt over the Nile, and internal opposition from ethno-nationalist and separatist groups within Ethiopia.

== Scope ==
=== Africa ===
==== Egypt ====
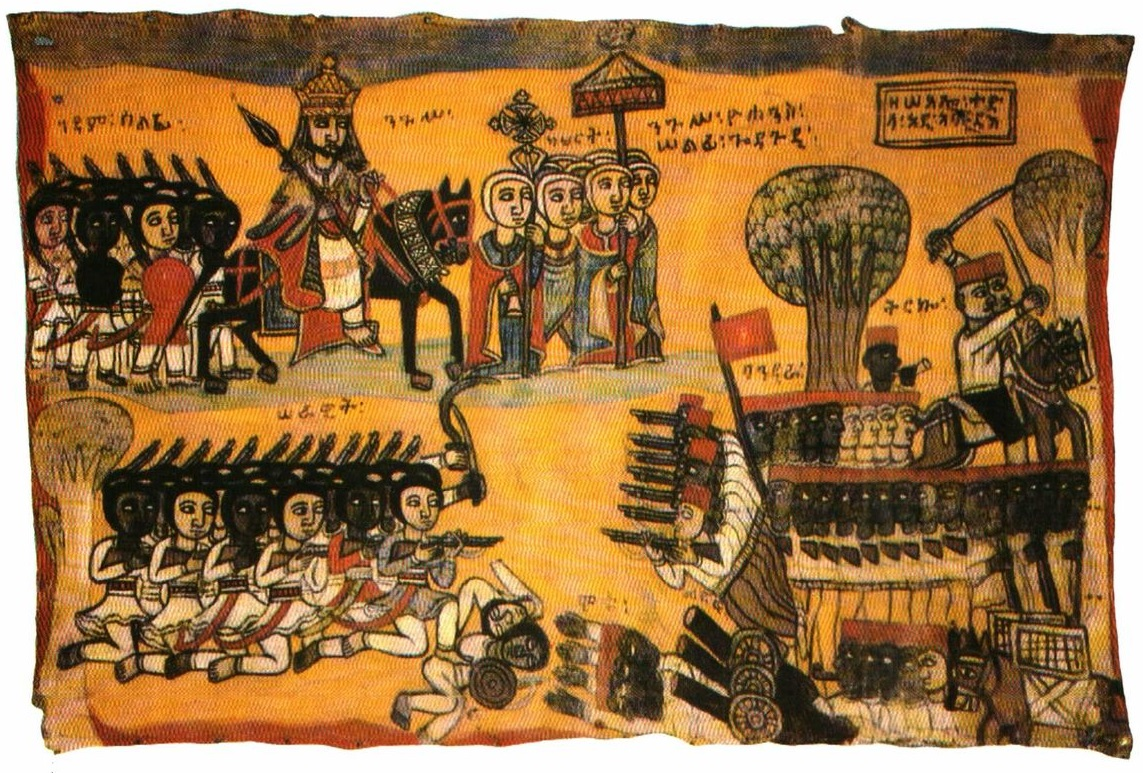
Ethiopian painting of the battle of Gundet, c. 1880

In the mid-19th century, a border conflict between the autonomous Ottoman province of Egypt and various Ethiopian warlords occurred soon after the Egyptian conquest of Sudan, being an extension of a greater series of Ottoman-Ethiopian wars. Egypt's Muhammad Ali initially entertained the idea of conquering all of Tigray and Amhara, but ultimately had only limited objectives in Ethiopia, namely to establish authority over the mineral rich slopes of Ethiopia's peripheral areas. However, Egypt would invade Ethiopia again in the 1870s under the leadership of Ali's grandson, Isma'il. Ethiopia would win this war, leaving Egypt devastated, and signed the Hewett Treaty alongside the United Kingdom to end it.

In terms of water politics, Egypt has historically maintained a cautious and at times adversarial posture toward Ethiopia due to the latter's control over the headwaters of the Blue Nile. Tensions have been particularly pronounced since the mid-20th century, with Egyptian officials viewing Ethiopian water development projects as a potential threat to Egypt's water security. Relations further deteriorated in the 2010s following Ethiopia's construction of the Grand Ethiopian Renaissance Dam (GERD). Egyptian leaders and state-aligned media have frequently portrayed the dam as an existential threat, leading to heightened anti-Ethiopian rhetoric in Egyptian political discourse and media. The dispute has been marked by periodic diplomatic crises, mutual accusations, and strong nationalist sentiment on both sides.

==== Eritrea ====
Relations between Eritrea and Ethiopia deteriorated significantly after the United Nations imposed a federation in 1950, which Ethiopia later annulled. Many Ethiopian nationalists, particularly Amhara elites, supported annexation, while leftist Eritreans viewed it as hostile to Muslim inhabitants and Eritrean statehood. This led to the formation of the Eritrean Liberation Front (ELF) in 1960 and the Eritrean War of Independence against both the imperial government of Haile Selassie and the subsequent Derg regime. The ELF later allied with the Tigray People’s Liberation Front (TPLF) until the Derg’s defeat in 1991. After the TPLF came to power in Ethiopia, relations improved temporarily until the 1998–2000 Eritrean–Ethiopian War. Following the Algiers Agreement in 2000, the two countries entered a prolonged stalemate and frozen conflict. In 2018, Prime Minister Abiy Ahmed and Eritrean President Isaias Afwerki signed a joint declaration at the bilateral summit in Asmara, formally ending the 20-year border conflict and restoring trade and diplomatic ties.

==== Somalia ====
Anti-Ethiopian sentiment became a feature of Somali foreign policy and militant rhetoric during the War in Somalia (2006–2009). Following Ethiopian government support for the US-led war on terror, Ethiopian forces, acting with the Transitional Federal Government of Somalia, entered Mogadishu on 28 December 2006 and expelled leaders of the Union of Islamic Courts (UIC). As the conflict escalated, the UIC, the Alliance for the Re-liberation of Somalia (ARS), and especially Al-Shabaab actively promoted and amplified anti-Ethiopian attitudes, with Al-Shabaab using the sentiment to strengthen its position and broaden its appeal as a movement.

==== Sudan ====
In order to settle a territorial dispute that had been ongoing since 1902, Sudan and Ethiopia signed a treaty in 2007 which would have allowed Ethiopian farmers to stay in al-Fashaga and keep cultivating the land there. However, in 2020, when the Tigray war broke out, Sudan’s army took advantage of the fact that Amhara militiamen and the Ethiopian military were deployed north as result, and broke the treaty by invading al-Fashaga and expelling thousands of Amhara farmers from their home.

Ethiopians who fled to Sudan as refugees of the Tigray war would sometimes find themselves victimized again upon arrival, this time by human traffickers. A number of refugees had testified to being kidnapped, regularly tortured, and transported to warehouses in Libya, where many would die due to poor living conditions. This situation worsened further after Sudan itself descended into a civil war in 2023, placing them at further risk of being kidnapped.

=== Europe ===
==== Italy ====
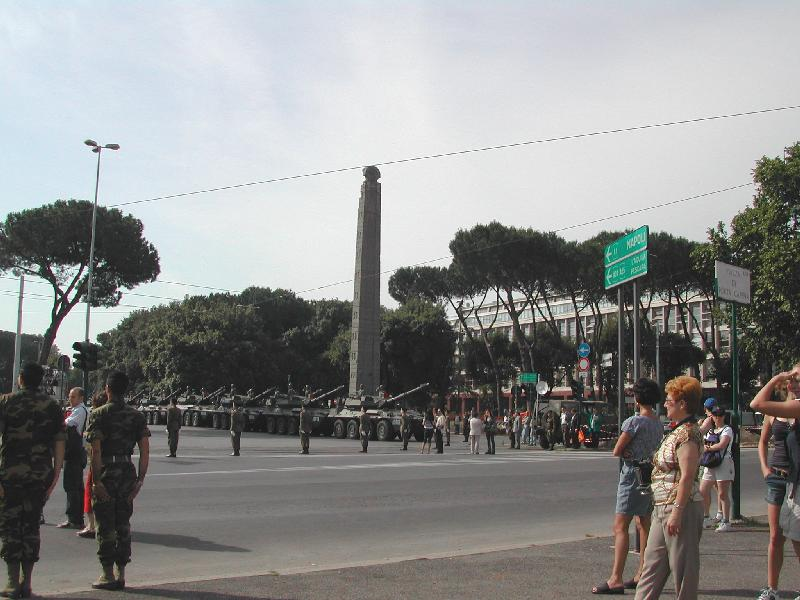
The Obelisk of Axum in Rome, Italy, before its repatriation.

Italian colonial interest in the Horn of Africa began in the late 19th century, but the decisive Ethiopian victory over Italian forces at the Battle of Adwa in 1896 created a lasting sense of national humiliation in Italy. The defeat was widely viewed as a profound blow to Italian prestige, fostering revanchist sentiments that persisted for decades.

Mussolini's Fascist regime explicitly framed the 1935 invasion as an act of revenge. When Italian troops entered Addis Ababa in May 1936, Mussolini proclaimed "Adua è vendicata" ("Adwa is avenged").

The Second Italo-Ethiopian War (1935–1936) and the subsequent five-year occupation (1936–1941) were marked by policies and military practices that reflected and amplified anti-Ethiopian sentiment. Italian forces made extensive use of chemical weapons, primarily sulphur mustard (mustard gas), dropped from aircraft in violation of the 1925 Geneva Protocol. Over 330 tons were used between late 1935 and early 1936, targeting not only combatants but also civilians, villages, water sources, and grazing land. Italian aircraft also deliberately bombed Red Cross ambulances and hospitals.

During the occupation, the Italian administration implemented racial segregation laws that classified Ethiopians as an inferior race, prohibited interracial marriage, and enforced strict social hierarchies. Resistance by the Arbegnoch was met with systematic reprisals, including village burnings, summary executions, forced labour, and concentration camps.

One of the most notorious episodes was the Addis Ababa massacre (19–21 February 1937). Following a failed assassination attempt on Viceroy Rodolfo Graziani, Italian forces, acting on orders from Federal Secretary Guido Cortese granting "carte blanche" to "destroy the Ethiopians for three days", carried out a three-day rampage of killings, arson, and looting in the capital. Historian Ian L. Campbell concluded in a 2017 study that approximately 19,200 people (roughly 20% of Addis Ababa's population at the time) were killed. Similar reprisals occurred elsewhere, including the massacre at the Debre Libanos monastery in May 1937.

Italian forces also systematically looted Ethiopian cultural heritage. In 1937, on direct orders from Mussolini, the 4th-century Obelisk of Axum was dismantled and shipped to Rome, where it was re-erected as a trophy of conquest. It was not returned to Ethiopia until 2005.

Historians' estimates of total Ethiopian deaths from the war, chemical attacks, massacres, induced famine, and occupation policies range from approximately 250,000 to over 700,000.

Post-war Italy showed limited official acknowledgement of these crimes for many decades.

==== United Kingdom ====
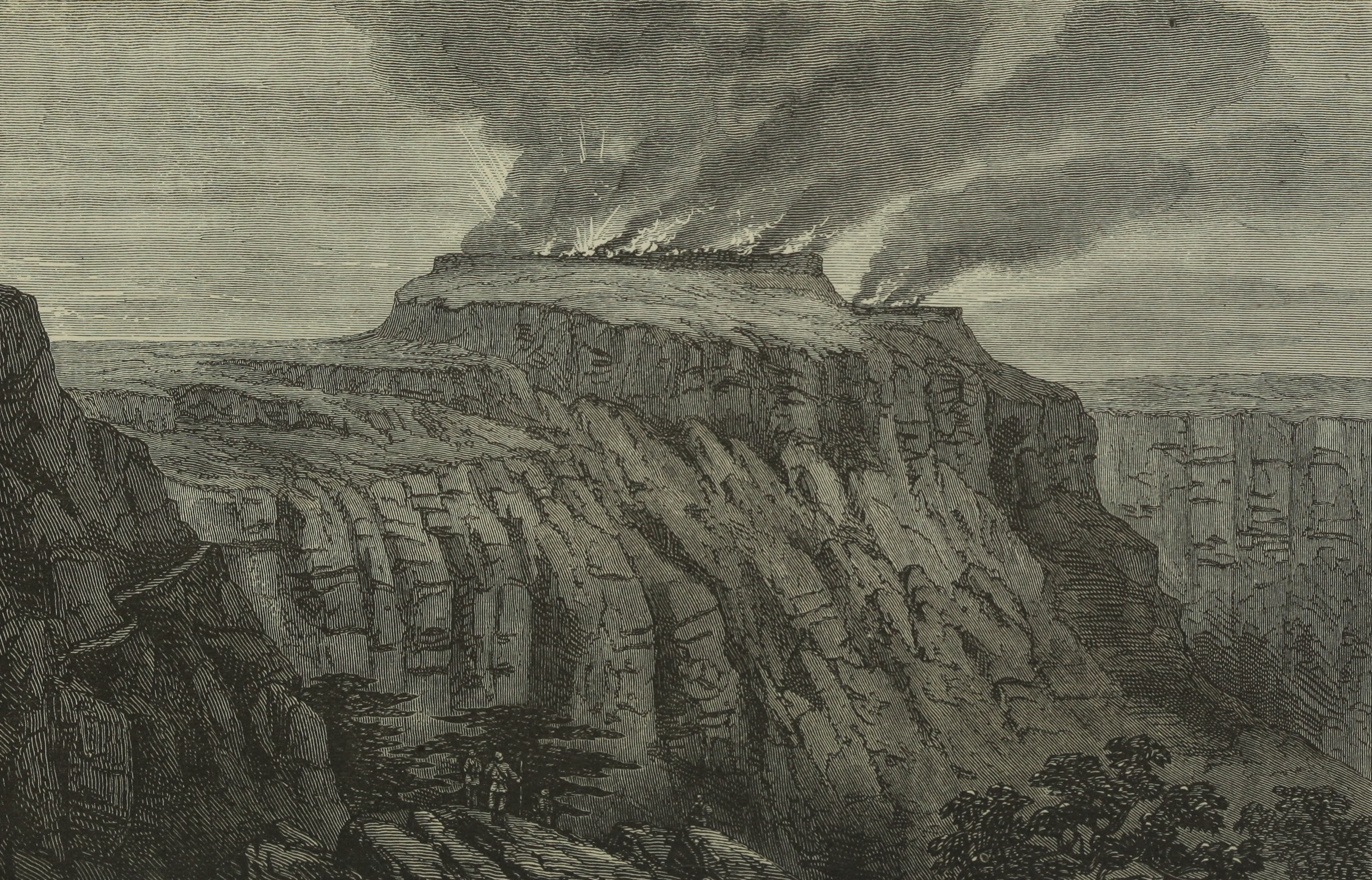
Artist depiction of the Fortress of Magdala burning down during the 1868 siege.

Motivated by the precariousness of his position as emperor, Tewodros II took British missionaries and government officials hostage in an attempt to force Britain to join a military alliance with Ethiopia. The UK responded by launching a punitive expedition against the country in 1867, defeating the Ethiopian military after besieging the capital of Magdala; in response, Tewodros decided to kill himself to avoid being captured.

Following the emperor's death, the church he was buried in was looted by British soldiers, with the permission of General Robert Napier. The British Museum sent a member of staff, Richard Rivington Holmes, as part of the expedition. After the expedition ended in 1868, many looted objects, cultural artifacts and art objects found their way into state and private collections, family possessions, and the hands of ordinary soldiers. Most of the books and manuscripts went to the British Museum or the Bodleian Library in Oxford, while a few went to the Royal Library in Windsor Castle and to smaller British collections. Other looted objects ended up in the Victoria and Albert Museum, the Museum of Mankind and the National Army Museum, the latter of whom agreed to return a lock of Tewodros' hair in 2019 which was taken during the expedition.

In 1935, there was widespread outrage amongst the British and French public when news leaked about a secret pact that was made between UK Foreign Secretary Samuel Hoare and French Foreign Minister Pierre Laval. The pact was intended to end the Second Italo-Ethiopian War, proposing that parts of Ethiopia be ceded to the Italian Empire, with the rest of the country being turned into an Italian client state; Ethiopia itself was not consulted with any of these plans. Following the negative publicity, the UK government withdrew the plan, and Hoare resigned.

=== Western Asia ===
==== Medieval Arabs ====
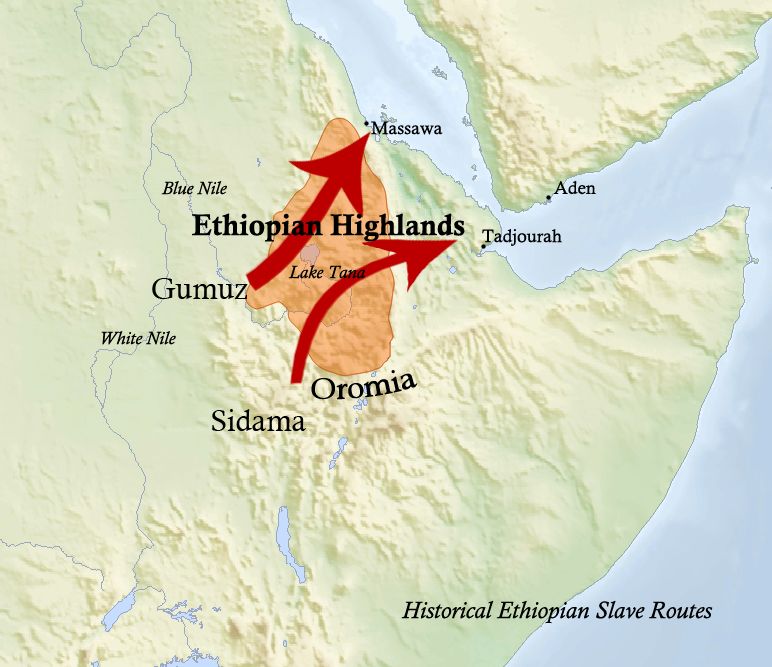
Slave trade routes through Ethiopia.

Pre-Islamic Arab relations outside of North Africa focused on the Kingdom of Aksum; the kingdom (a polity that ruled over what is now Eritrea and Ethiopia) exerted considerable power and sometimes direct rule in the Arabian Peninsula from as early as the 2nd BCE to around the Year of the Elephant (sometime in the 550s to 570s), when, at least according to Islamic tradition, increasingly united Arabs defeated Aksumite armies which ruled southern Arabia. As Aksumite power declined in the Middle Ages, and military challenges to Arabs' power came increasingly from the Byzantine Empire and Persia, Arab political relationships with sub-Saharan Africa shifted. Relations with Aksum focused not on war but on trading, particularly as part of the Indian Ocean and Red Sea slave trades, with East African slaves being sold and shipped over to the Hejaz.

Following the end of the Rashidun Caliphate, Muslim identity was viewed as synonymous with Arab ethnicity, especially by much of the Umayyad elite. Tthe non-Arab mawla (converts) freedmen – who were captured, enslaved, converted and manumitted – were considered inferior Muslims and fiscally, politically, socially and military discriminated against them. According to Helmi Sharawi, the practice of slavery was "the foundation of Arab production modes for ten centuries and gave rise to the image of 'Master Arab merchant' who dominated the Abyssinian or Negro slave".

The low status of Black people were stated in a number of contemporary anecdotes in the Umayyad Caliphate, such as, for example, in the comment of an Arab who expressed his dislike of a civil war among fellow Arabs referring to an "Ethiopian" (Black African), stating that he "would prefer to be a mutilated Ethiopian slave tending broody goats on a hilltop until death overtakes him, rather than that a single arrow should be shot between the two sides".

==== Saudi Arabia ====
According to Amnesty International, thousands of Ethiopian migrants, including pregnant women and children, were arbitrarily detained in harsh conditions across the kingdom since March 2020. Detainees didn't get adequate food, water, health care, sanitation facilities and clothes. The prison cells were severely overcrowded and prisoners were not allowed to go outside. The specific needs of pregnant and lactating women were also not fulfilled by the prison authorities and the new born babies, infants and teenagers were detained and kept in the same dire conditions as adults.

On 8 October 2020, based on the investigation led by The Telegraph, the European Parliament criticized Saudi Arabia for its treatment of Ethiopian migrants being held like slaves in COVID-19 detention camps. Footage captured on phones smuggled inside by the migrants showed thousands of men, women and children with scars from wounds of beating, torture and disfiguring skin infections.

Guards of the Saudi General Directorate of Border Guard have been accused of killing hundreds of Ethiopian refugees and asylum seekers along the Saudi Arabian–Yemeni border from March 2022 to June 2023. Human Rights Watch stated that these killings may qualify as crimes against humanity, with reports stating that explosive weaponry were used to kill many migrants at close range, including women and children. In addition to killing and beating migrants, the Saudi border guards were also reported to have raped female migrants, as well as forcing local men and boys to carry out these rapes.

As of June 2024, border killings were reported to still be occurring on a regular basis.

==== Israel ====
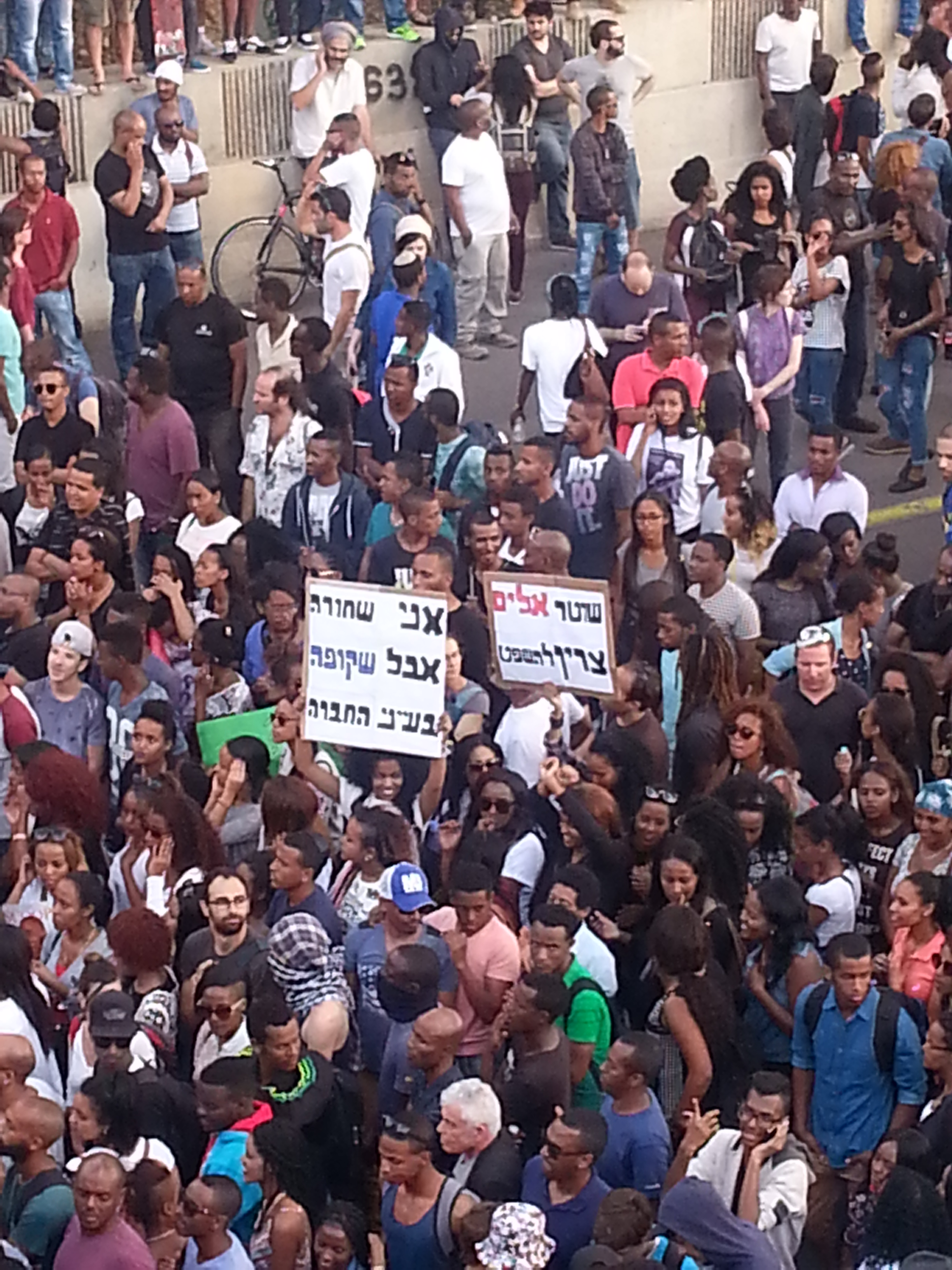
Ethiopian Jews and other Israelis protesting in Tel Aviv.

The Ethiopian Jewish (Beta Israel) community in Israel has long complained of discrimination, racism, and poverty. The absorption of Ethiopians in Israeli society represents an ambitious attempt to deny the significance of race. Israeli authorities, aware of the situation of most African diaspora communities in other Western countries, hosted programs to avoid setting in patterns of discrimination. The Ethiopian Jewish community's internal challenges have been complicated by perceived racist attitudes in some sectors of Israeli society and the establishment. Demonstrations in Israel have occurred protesting the alleged racism against Ethiopian immigrants.

In April 2015, an Ethiopian IDF soldier was the victim of an unprovoked and allegedly racist attack by an Israeli policeman and the attack was caught on video. The soldier, Damas Pakedeh, was arrested and then released, after being accused of attacking the policeman. Pakadeh is an orphan who emigrated from Ethiopia with his siblings in 2008. He believes the incident was racially motivated, and that, if the video had not been taken, he would have been punished. Instead, the police officer and volunteer were suspended pending an investigation. Likud MK Avraham Neguise called on National Police Chief Yohanan Danino to prosecute the police officer and volunteer, saying they engaged in "a gross violation of the basic law of respecting others and their liberty by those who are supposed to protect us". The Jerusalem Post notes that in 2015, "there have been a series of reports in the Israeli press about alleged acts of police brutality against Ethiopian Israelis, with many in the community saying they are unfairly targeted and treated more harshly than other citizens".

The incident of police brutality with Pakedeh and alleged brutality of officials from Israel's Administration of Border Crossings, Population, and Immigration with Walla Bayach, an Israeli of Ethiopian descent, brought the Ethiopian community to protest. Hundreds of Ethiopians participated in protests in the streets of Jerusalem on April 20, 2015, to decry what they view as "rampant racism" and violence in Israel directed at their community. Israel Police Commissioner Yohanan Danino met with representatives of the Israeli Ethiopian community that day following the recent violent incidents involving police officers and members of the community. When over a thousand people protested police brutality against Ethiopians and Mizrahi Israelis, Prime Minister Benjamin Netanyahu announced: "I strongly condemn the beating of the Ethiopian IDF soldier, and those responsible will be held accountable."

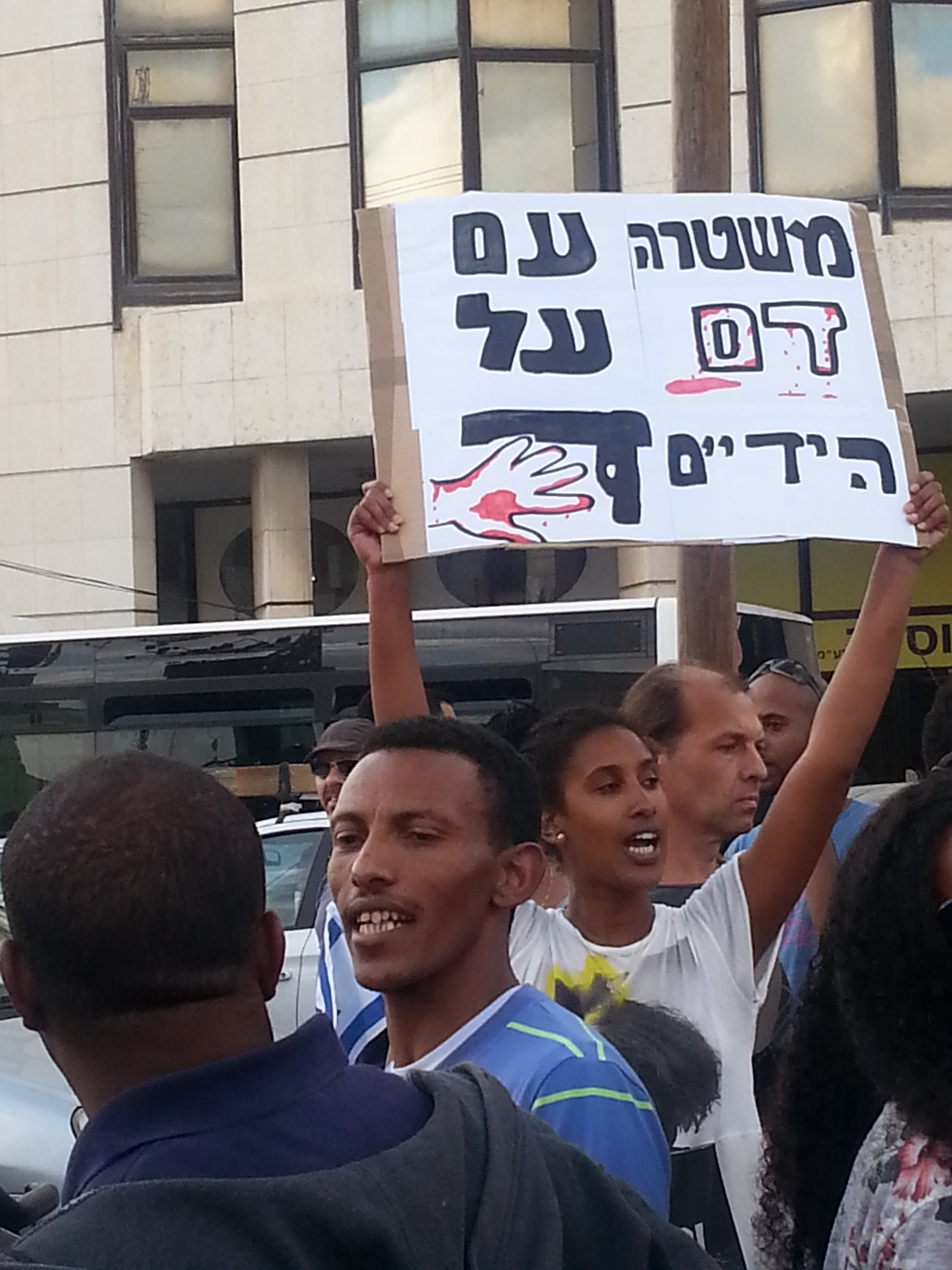
Ethiopian Jewish woman holding a sign reading "The police have blood on their hands" during a protest in Tel Aviv.

Large protests broke out in July 2019 after Solomon Teka, a young Ethiopian man, was shot and killed by an off-duty police officer, in Kiryat Haim, Haifa, in northern Israel.

On 8 December 2012, the Israeli Educational Television program Vacuum, hosted by Gal Gabbai, aired a report claiming that in 2004, female Ethiopian Jewish immigrants were coerced into receiving Depo‑Provera injections in transit camps in Ethiopia. They were told it was a prerequisite for immigration and often misled into believing that it was a vaccination rather than birth control.

The practice was first reported in 2010 by Isha le'Isha (Hebrew: Woman to Woman), an Israeli women's rights organization. Hedva Eyal, the author of the report, stated: "We believe it is a method of reducing the number of births in a community that is black and mostly poor."

Haaretz criticized international coverage of the issue, stating that although some Ethiopian Jewish women's procreational rights had been violated through medical malpractice, these effects would only last for three months, and that any claims of a state-sponsored sterilization were falsehoods warped by circular reporting. The newspaper also issued a correction to their earlier reporting on the story.

A 2016 investigation into the claims of the 35 women found no evidence that forced birth control injections of Ethiopian Jews had taken place. In a subsequent independent study, the decline in fertility rate was shown to be "the product of urbanization, improved educational opportunities, a later age of marriage and commencement of childbirth and an earlier age of cessation of childbearing."

== Internal (Ethiopia) ==
Opposition to Ethiopian nationalism within Ethiopia has primarily come from various ethno-nationalist movements. Ethiopian nationalism, often framed as a form of civic nationalism, has been rejected by groups such as the Oromo Liberation Front (OLF). Oromo nationalists argue that the Amhara-Tigray dominated Ethiopian Empire historically subjugated the Oromo people and incorporated their lands through conquest. They further claim that the Oromo nation maintained its own distinct social and political traditions, which were suppressed by Abyssinian expansionism, particularly during the conquests led by Emperor Menelik II in the late 19th century.

Similarly, ethnic Somali populations in Ethiopia have historically rejected the central state's national project, viewing it as an external imposition. This friction was starkly highlighted during the Ogaden War (1977–1978), where many ethnic Somalis aligned with the Somali Democratic Republic or insurgent groups like the Western Somali Liberation Front (WSLF) to pursue self-determination, citing a history of political and economic exclusion as drivers for their resistance.

Oromo nationalists have also asserted that Ethiopian nationalism functions as a vehicle for Amhara cultural assimilation. While the Amhara people have long been closely associated with the Ethiopian national movement, the concept and political use of “Amhara nationalism” remains heavily debated among historians and scholars.

== See also ==
- Persecution of Amhara people
- Persecution of Tigray people
- Anti-Amhara sentiment
- Anti-Tigrayan sentiment
- Anti-Oromo sentiment
- Anti-Somali sentiment
- Somali nationalism
- Ethiopian nationalism
- Eritrean nationalism
- Oromo nationalism
- Egyptian nationalism
