= Anti-Oromo sentiment =

Ethnic hatred against Oromo people in Ethiopia

Anti-Oromo sentiment or Oromophobia, is opposition, hatred, discrimination or prejudice against the Oromo ethnic group. Anti-Oromo sentiment has its roots during the rule of the Ethiopian Empire, particularly in the reign of Emperor Menelik II (reigned 1889–1913). Oromo nationalists argued that the Oromo have been subjugated and oppressed by the dominant Amhara feudal rulers and that the oppression persisted throughout 20th century. Under Haile Selassie (reigned 1930–1974), the Oromos were the target of persecution in the wake of waves of resistance. Many Oromo revolutionaries like Mamo Mazamir, Haile Mariam Gamada and General Tadesse Birru faced persecution by the Selassie government and/or execution under the Derg regime (1974–1987).

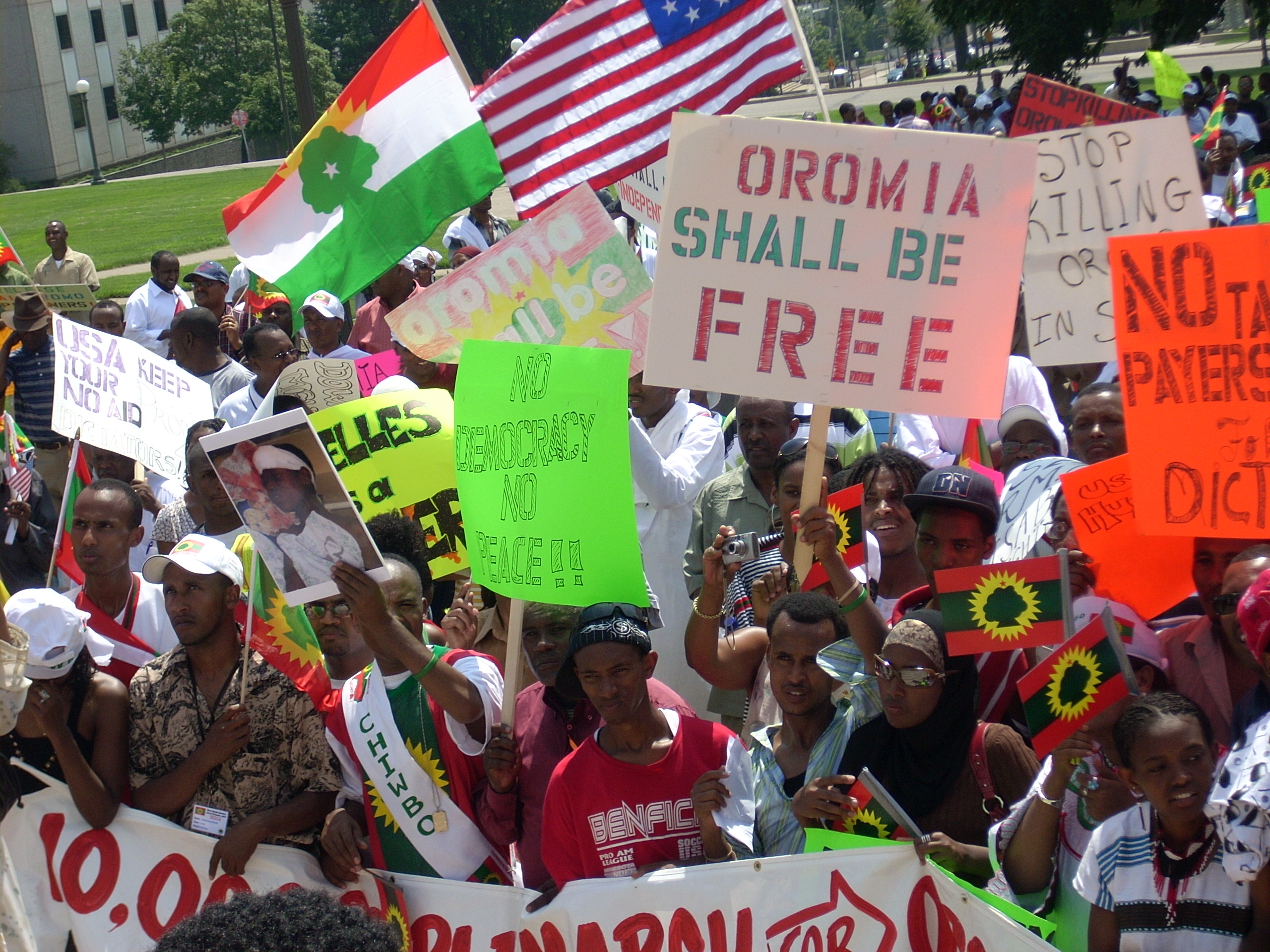
Oromo protesters in March 2007

Oromo also faced persecutions and human rights violations under TPLF-led EPRDF period since 1991. Today, Oromo nationalists used the term to dismantle anti-Ethiopian and anti-Amhara sentiments which are used to justify ethnic violence. Such scenario can be understood during Abiy Ahmed leadership, where the term "Oromummaa" dominated through autocratic based political system.

== Historical perspectives ==
Nowadays, anti-Oromo sentiment is a complex topic. Oromo elites and nationalists accused the Ethiopian Empire rule of subjugating and oppressing the Oromos during the late 19th and early 20th century. Notable among such assertions is the Aanolee massacre on 6 September 1886, in which the army of Emperor Menelik II massacred against Arsi Oromos in one day, cutting breasts and men's hands. They claim the Amhara nationalists used his action correlating to Ethiopian independence against European colonial rule during the Scramble for Africa. Such atrocities were documented during the Tewodros II reign, including hand amputations of 700 Oromos in revenge of the death of his British advisor.

Menelik II expanded his realm by 1870s, completing the conquest of Tulama, and together with Emperor Yohannss IV, they devastated the lives of Wollo Oromo. At the battle of Chelenqo in 1887, Menelik committed ethnic cleansing against Oromos. According to Harold Marcus (1995), Menelik commenced slave trade. Sandra Shell wrote that Menelik exported Oromo slaves but intercepted by British navy into South Africa. There, Oromo descendants told their narratives about their origin, capture, enslavement and being sold into slavery by Menelik and his "neftenya" officials.

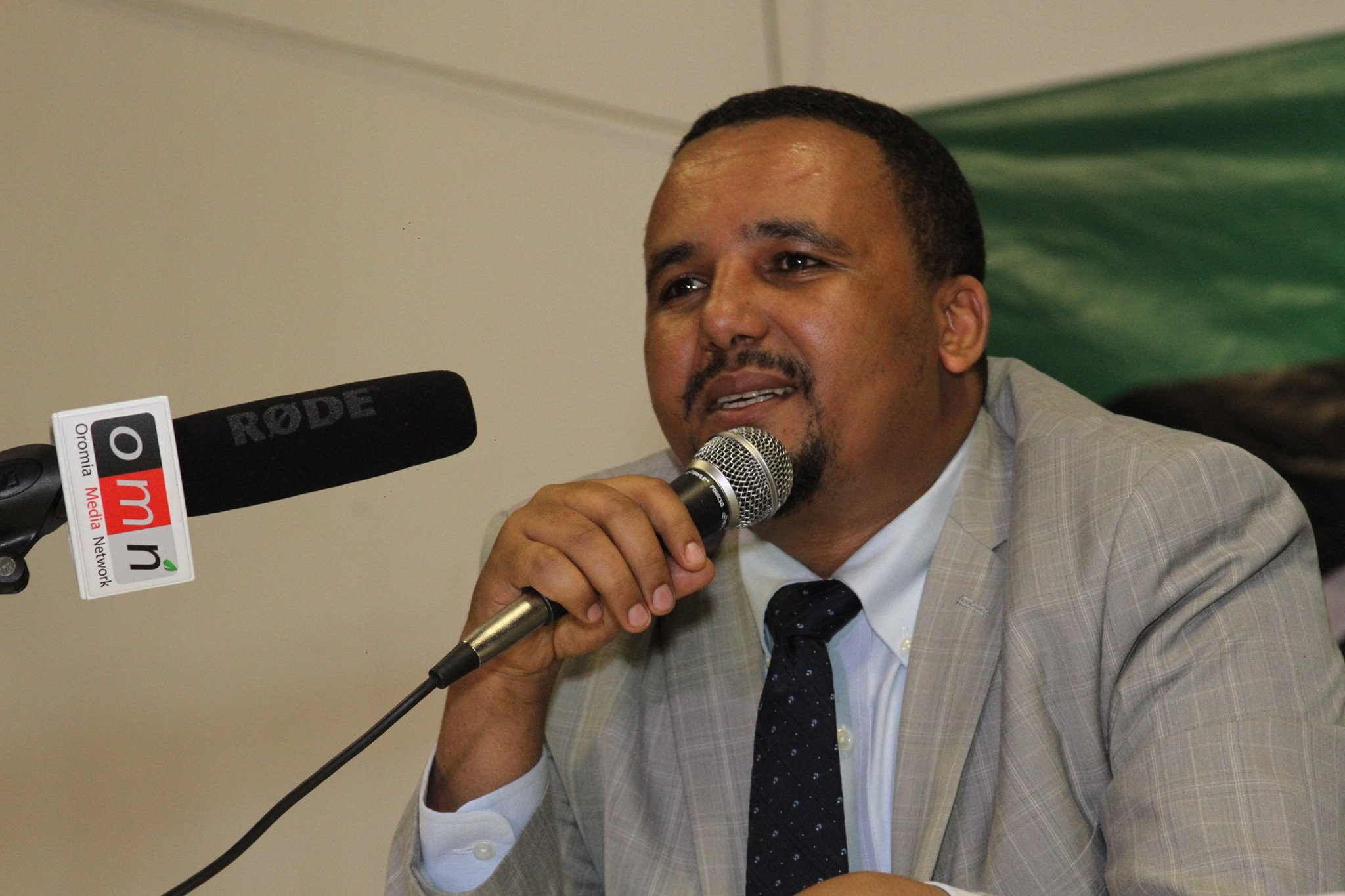
Oromo activist and analyst Jawar Mohammed

Oromos were targeted persecution under Emperor Haile Selassie's regime. In 1963, Haile Selassie used modern mechanized ground and air forces with the F-15s that resulted in killing hundreds of Oromos. The foundation of Macha Tulama Self-Help Association in 1960s was a major threat of Selassie's government, he labeled them as a "terrorist group" and its leaders were frequently put to death after being arrested. Oromo language has been outlawed on judicial, educational and official business institutions. Notable Oromo resistant figures have been killed by the Selassie's government and then the Derg regime, such as Lieutenant Mamo Mazamir, Haile Mariam Gamada, and General Tadesse Birru. In 1991 and 1992, Oromos have been targeted by TPLF-led EPRDF regime when it mobilized local Amhara inhabitants in Oromia supported by the Amhara National Democratic Movement (ANDM). In present times, Oromo nationalism is linked to anti-Ethiopian and anti-Amhara sentiment and used by Abiy Ahmed administration. The term "Oromummaa" applied through the Prosperity Party that encompasses elements of Oromization of Ethiopia.

== See also ==
- Oromo conflict
- OLA insurgency
- Oromo nationalism
