= Somali Americans =

Americans of Somali birth or descent

Soomaalida Maraykanka (Somali)

Total population
- 169,799 (2023); Total Somali ancestry 92,401 (2023); Somalia-born

Regions with significant populations
- Minneapolis-St. Paul-Bloomington; Columbus, Ohio; Seattle-Tacoma-Bellevue; New York City

Languages
- Somali; American English

Religion
- Predominantly Sunni Islam

Related ethnic groups
- Somali Canadians

Somali Americans are Americans of Somali ancestry. The first ethnic Somalis to arrive in the United States were sailors who came in the 1920s from British Somaliland. They were followed by students pursuing higher studies in the 1960s and 1970s. From the late 1970s to the late 1980s and early 1990s, more Somalis arrived.

In the mid and late 1990s, the largest number of Somalis arrived, after civil war in Somalia. The Somali community in the US is now among the largest in the Somali diaspora.

Minnesota, particularly the Minneapolis–Saint Paul area, has the largest Somali community in the United States. In 2025 and 2026, Somali neighborhoods in Minnesota were a focus of federal immigration enforcement, and the federal government moved to end temporary protected status for Somali nationals.

== History ==
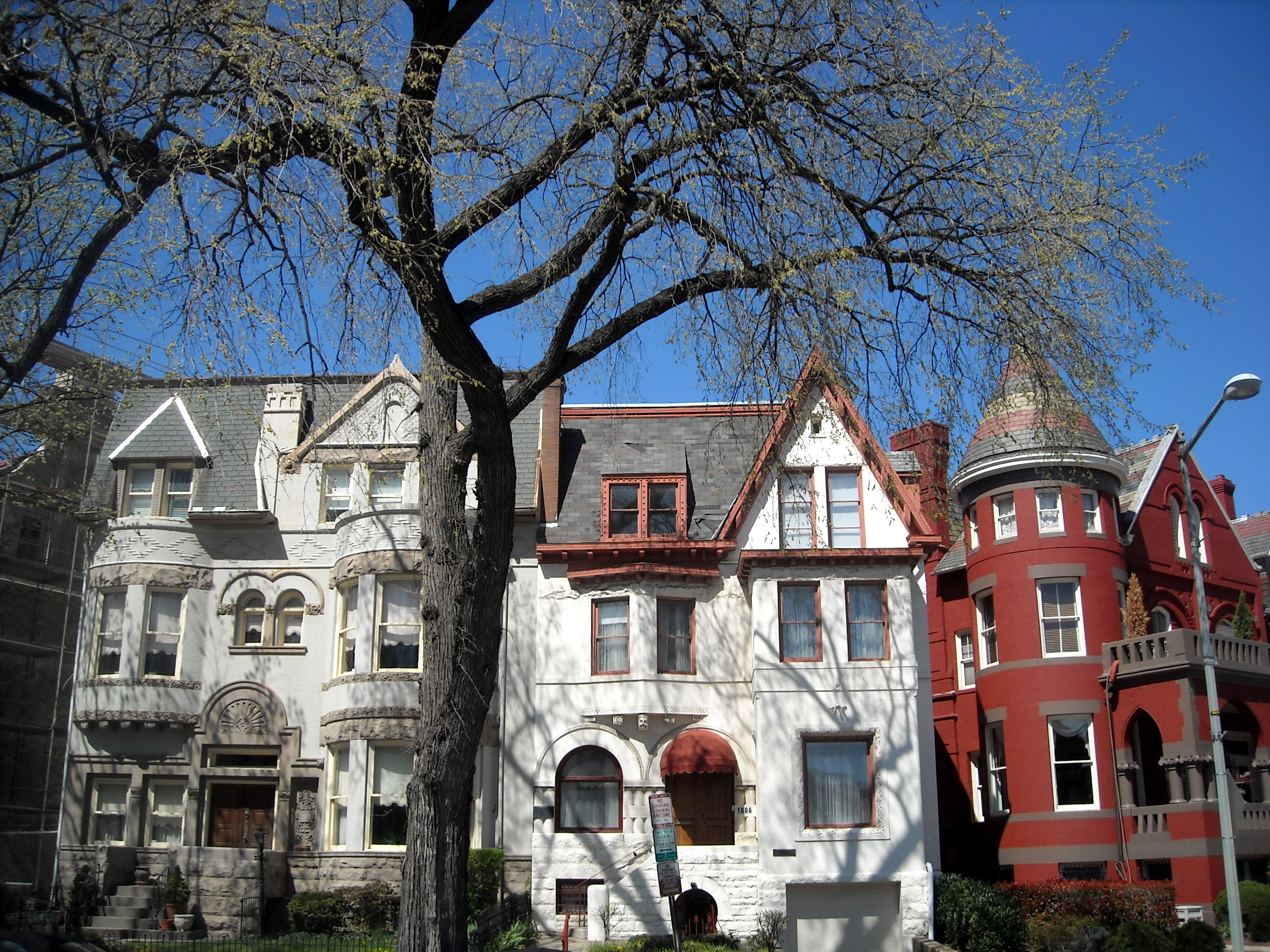
The former Somali embassy in Washington, D.C.

The first Somalis in the United States were a small group of sailors who settled in New York City in the 1920s. Eventually acquiring American citizenship, they actively participated in the Somali independence movement and served as key liaisons whenever Somali political figures visited the UN headquarters. For their substantial contributions to Somali society, these early Somali expatriates were rewarded with medals by the Somali government and some were also issued land back home.

Following Somali independence in 1960, Somali students began arriving in the US to pursue higher studies while living with relatives or on scholarships. Many of the young returned to Somalia after graduation and played an important role in the development of Somalia. In the 1980s, a small number of Somalis settled in the United States. They were later joined by many other ethnic Somalis from different backgrounds, who sought asylum in the US after the outbreak of the civil war in Somalia, or emigrated from other parts of Greater Somalia.

A large number of the Somali immigrants settled in Minnesota, which by 2002 harbored the largest population of Somalis in North America. Many of the newer arrivals came through voluntary agencies (VOLAGS) contracted with the State Department, who helped them settle in. In 2006, Somalis in the state accounted for $164–$394 million in purchasing power and owned 600 businesses. The city of Minneapolis in particular hosts hundreds of Somali-owned and operated commercial ventures. In 2015, there were 57,000 residents in Minnesota of Somali ancestry, among whom 31,400 were born in Somalia.

Somalis in the United States often send resources to their extended families abroad, remittances that were facilitated by the signing of the 2014 Money Remittances Improvement Act. In 2012, following a greatly improved security situation in Somalia, many Somali US residents began returning to Mogadishu and other parts of the country. A few of the homeward-bound immigrants along with some American-born associates have been sought and/or prosecuted for allegedly providing material support to the Al-Shabaab and Islamic State political militant groups. However, according to intelligence officials, fewer expatriates were joining the groups' ranks by late 2013.

Most of the returnees have instead repatriated for investment opportunities and to take part in the ongoing post-conflict reconstruction process in Somalia. Participating in the renovation of schools, hospitals, roads and other infrastructure, they have played a leading role in Mogadishu's recovery and have helped propel the local real estate market.

=== Anti-Somali sentiment and targeting of Somalis by Trump administration ===
Since 2022, the Somali American community in Minnesota has been at the center of several high-profile federal fraud investigations. The most significant was the Feeding Our Future scandal, described by the Department of Justice as the largest pandemic-related fraud scheme in the U.S. Federal prosecutors alleged that a network of individuals, many of Somali descent, defrauded the government of approximately $250 million intended for child nutrition programs during the COVID-19 pandemic. As of early 2026, dozens of individuals have been convicted or pleaded guilty, with some receiving sentences of up to 12 years.

The investigations expanded into other sectors, including daycare and healthcare fraud.

- Daycare Fraud: In 2025, federal and state authorities launched a "surge" of investigations into Somali-owned childcare centers in the Twin Cities following allegations of $100 million in fraudulent billing through the Child Care Assistance Program, though no one has been arrested or charged with any crimes.
- Autism and Medicaid Fraud: Prosecutors have charged a woman, who was also charged in the Feeding Our Future case, with defrauding the Early Intensive Developmental and Behavioral Intervention (EIDBI) program, alleging that millions of dollars meant for children with autism were diverted for personal use, including luxury purchases and overseas investments.

While legal proceedings have focused on specific individuals, the fraud cases have contributed to a rise in broader anti-Somali sentiment. Community leaders and advocates, including Representative Ilhan Omar, have argued that the actions of a few are being used to "scapegoat" the entire community.

Incidents of Anti-Somali sentiment rhetoric increased significantly in late 2025 following comments by President Trump, who referred to the community as "garbage" and suggested they "contribute nothing" during a cabinet meeting. This rhetoric has coincided with:

- Vandalism and Harassment: Reports of vandalism at Somali-run businesses and harassment of women wearing hijabs in Minnesota.
- Policy Shifts: The citing of fraud cases as justification for the suspension of Temporary Protected Status (TPS) for Somali nationals and increased ICE enforcement operations specifically targeting Somali neighborhoods.

Somalis in the US have been the subject of rhetorical attacks from Donald Trump. In a rally two days before the 2016 US presidential election, Trump called Somalis "a disaster" for Minnesota. During his second term as president of the United States, Trump engaged in what The Guardian has described as "extended racist tirade[s]" against Somalis in the US and in Minnesota specifically, stating in December 2025: "Those Somalians should be out of here. They've destroyed our country. And all they do is complain, complain, complain". A week earlier, Trump had called Somalis "garbage" and "said he didn't want any of them to be in the US". Trump's administration has ended the Temporary Protected Status program for Somalis in Minnesota and directed Immigration and Customs Enforcement to conduct raids in Minneapolis. Trump has falsely claimed that Ilhan Omar, the US representative for Minnesota's 5th congressional district, who is Somali-American, is in the US "illegally".

== Demographics ==
Counties of Minnesota by percent with Somali ancestry

Estimates of the number of Somali immigrants living in the United States vary widely, ranging from 35,760 to 150,000 persons. 2010 American Community Survey data indicates that there are approximately 85,700 people with Somali ancestry in the US. Of those, around 25,000 or one third live in Minnesota; 21,000 of the latter were born in Somalia. Nationwide, 76,205 were Somalia-born. Somalis are the second largest ethnic group from the Horn of Africa, after Ethiopians.

In 2008–2012, the largest concentration of Somalia-born people in the United States were in the Minneapolis-St. Paul-Bloomington area (17,320) of Minnesota. Other metropolitan areas with significant numbers of Somali Americans include Columbus, Ohio (10,280), Seattle-Tacoma-Bellevue in Washington (7,850), San Diego-Carlsbad-San Marcos in California (2,845), Washington, D.C.-Arlington-Alexandria in the Virginia-D.C. area (2,715), Atlanta-Sandy Springs-Marietta in Georgia (2,305), Phoenix-Mesa-Glendale in Arizona (1,965), Portland-Vancouver-Hillsboro in Oregon (1,480), Nashville-Davidson-Murfreesboro-Franklin in Tennessee (1,420), Boston-Cambridge-Quincy in Massachusetts (1,380), and other areas (28,650).

In 2014, the Minneapolis City Council passed a resolution marking July 1 as Somali American Day. The event commemorates the Independence Day of Somalia, which is annually celebrated on the same day. The council also approved a resolution making Minneapolis and Bosaso in northeastern Somalia, sister cities. In 2014, the Federal Government of Somalia announced that it would start officially keeping count of Somalis abroad.

=== By state ===
State	Number	Percent of state
Minnesota	91,111	1.60%
Ohio	26,160	0.22%
Washington	16,931	0.22%
California	7,750	0.02%
New York	6,505	0.03%
Texas	5,824	0.02%
Missouri	4,350	0.07%
Virginia	4,243	0.05%
Massachusetts	4,184	0.06%
Arizona	3,924	0.05%
Kentucky	3,907	0.09%
Nebraska	3,788	0.19%
Oregon	3,777	0.09%
(Georgia (U.S. state)) Georgia	3,725	0.03%
Colorado	3,663	0.06%
Wisconsin	3,502	0.06%
Maine	3,443	0.25%
Tennessee	3,180	0.05%
Utah	2,128	0.07%
North Dakota	2,058	0.26%
Michigan	1,979	0.02%
Illinois	1,844	0.01%
Pennsylvania	1,751	0.01%
Iowa	1,670	0.05%
North Carolina	1,399	0.01%
Maryland	1,239	0.02%
Kansas	993	0.03%
Indiana	816	0.01%
Vermont	740	0.12%
Florida	615	0.003%
South Dakota	556	0.06%
Idaho	473	0.03%
Alaska	376	0.05%
Nevada	374	0.01%
Connecticut	349	0.01%
New Hampshire	314	0.02%
New Jersey	303	0.003%
South Carolina	194	0.004%
District of Columbia	192	0.03%
Louisiana	141	0.003%
Oklahoma	127	0.003%
Alabama	120	0.002%
New Mexico	81	0.004%
Rhode Island	64	0.006%
Mississippi	63	0.002%
Arkansas	46	0.002%
Hawaii	45	0.003%
Delaware	32	0.003%
Puerto Rico	27	0.0008%
West Virginia	26	0.001%
Wyoming	18	0.003%
Montana	17	0.002%

== Employment ==
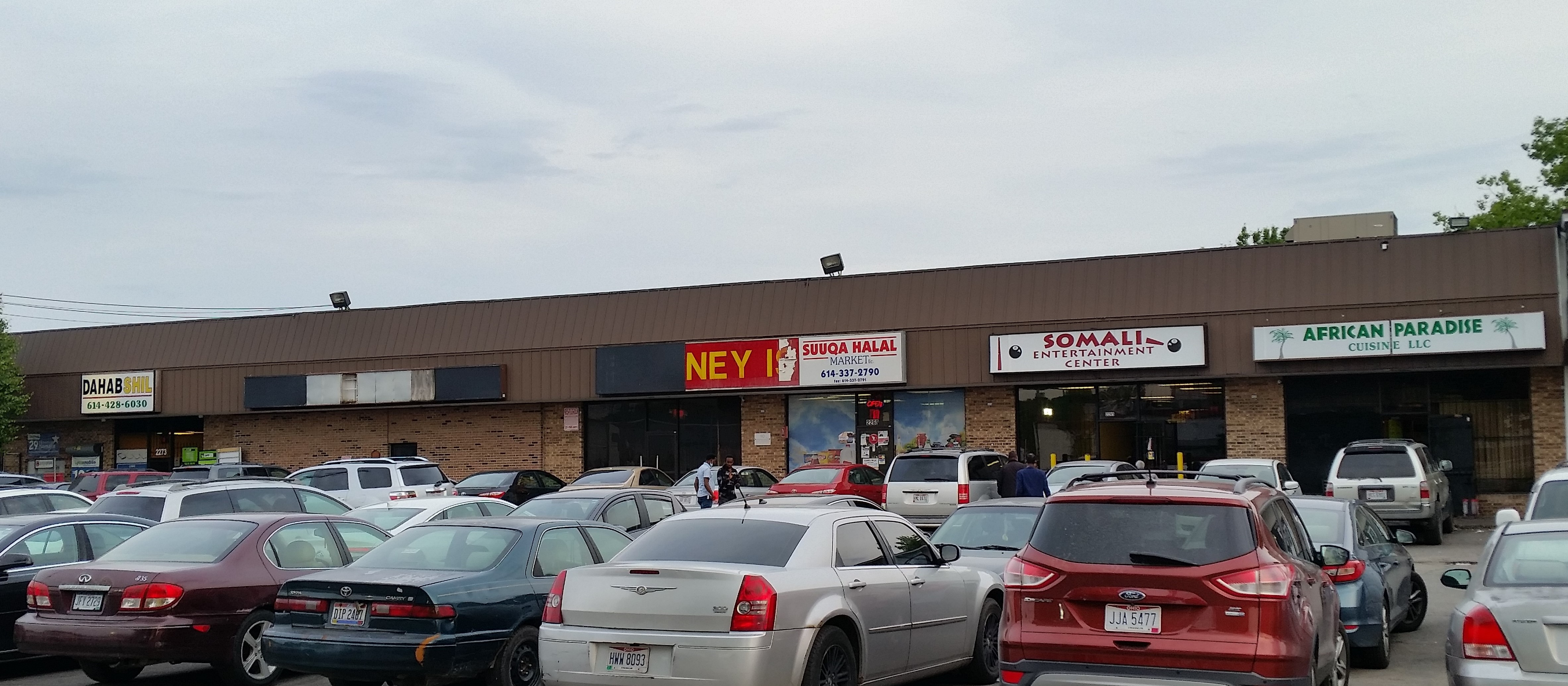
This strip mall in the Northland neighborhood of Columbus, Ohio has several Somali businesses: a funds transfer company, grocery store, entertainment center, and restaurant.

Many Somali refugees in the US have experienced difficulties accessing the labor market at first, but have been experiencing a steady increase in employment rates in recent years. At the time of the 2010 census, 47% of Somalis in Minnesota were employed, 13% unemployed and 40% were economically inactive. By comparison, the unemployment amongst the state's overall foreign-born population was 6%.

Earlier data from the 2000 US Census indicated a gender disparity in employment among Somali immigrants in Minneapolis: 65% of Somali men were employed compared to 35% of Somali women. This was cited by Helskog, who argued that finding unemployed Somalis in Minneapolis was difficult.

Similarly, researcher Cindy Horst noted that Somali immigrants in Minneapolis were often perceived as economically active and highly engaged in the labor market, particularly among men.

At the national level, survey data over the period 2011 to 2015 showed that 58% of working-age Somali Americans were employed, and 5.1% were self-employed. In Minnesota, Somali Americans had slightly higher employment and self-employment rates, at 62% and 5.9% respectively, a difference attributed to the state's strong economy.

Analysis by the Fiscal Studies Institute of 2014 American Community Survey five-year data showed that the labour force participation rate of Somali men aged 25 to 64 was 84%, with the rate for women being 64%, compared to 81% and 73% of US-born men and women respectively.

== Community organizations ==
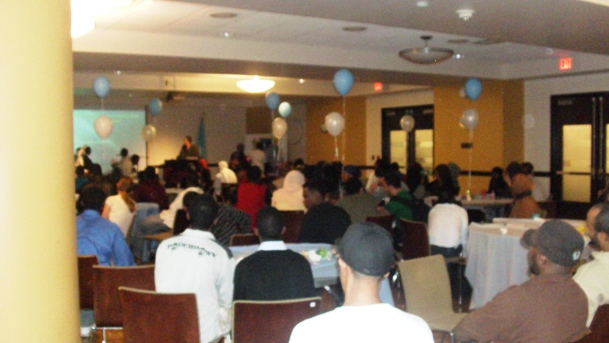
A Somali cultural event hosted by the Somali Student Association at the University of Minnesota.

The Somali community in the United States is represented by various Somali-run organizations. Somali Community Services in San Jose and the Somali American Council of Oregon (SACOO) on the west coast offer guidance to new Somali families and works closely with the municipal authorities to strengthen civic relations.

The Somali Community Access Network (SomaliCAN) is one of several groups serving Columbus' Somali community. In Minnesota, the Confederation of Somali Community in Minnesota (CSCM), Somali American Parent Association (SAPA), and Somali Action Alliance also offer various social services to the state's resident Somalis.

Politically, a Somali American Caucus in the Minnesota Democratic–Farmer–Labor Party (DFL) was formed to represent the Somali community. A Somali American also chairs the Republican Party's Immigrant Relations Committee in Minnesota.

== Diplomatic missions ==
Somalis in the United States are represented by the embassy of Somalia in Washington, D.C. The embassies of Djibouti and Ethiopia in the capital provide additional diplomatic representation for resident ethnic Somalis. The breakaway region of Somaliland maintains a representative office in Washington as well.

== Notable people ==
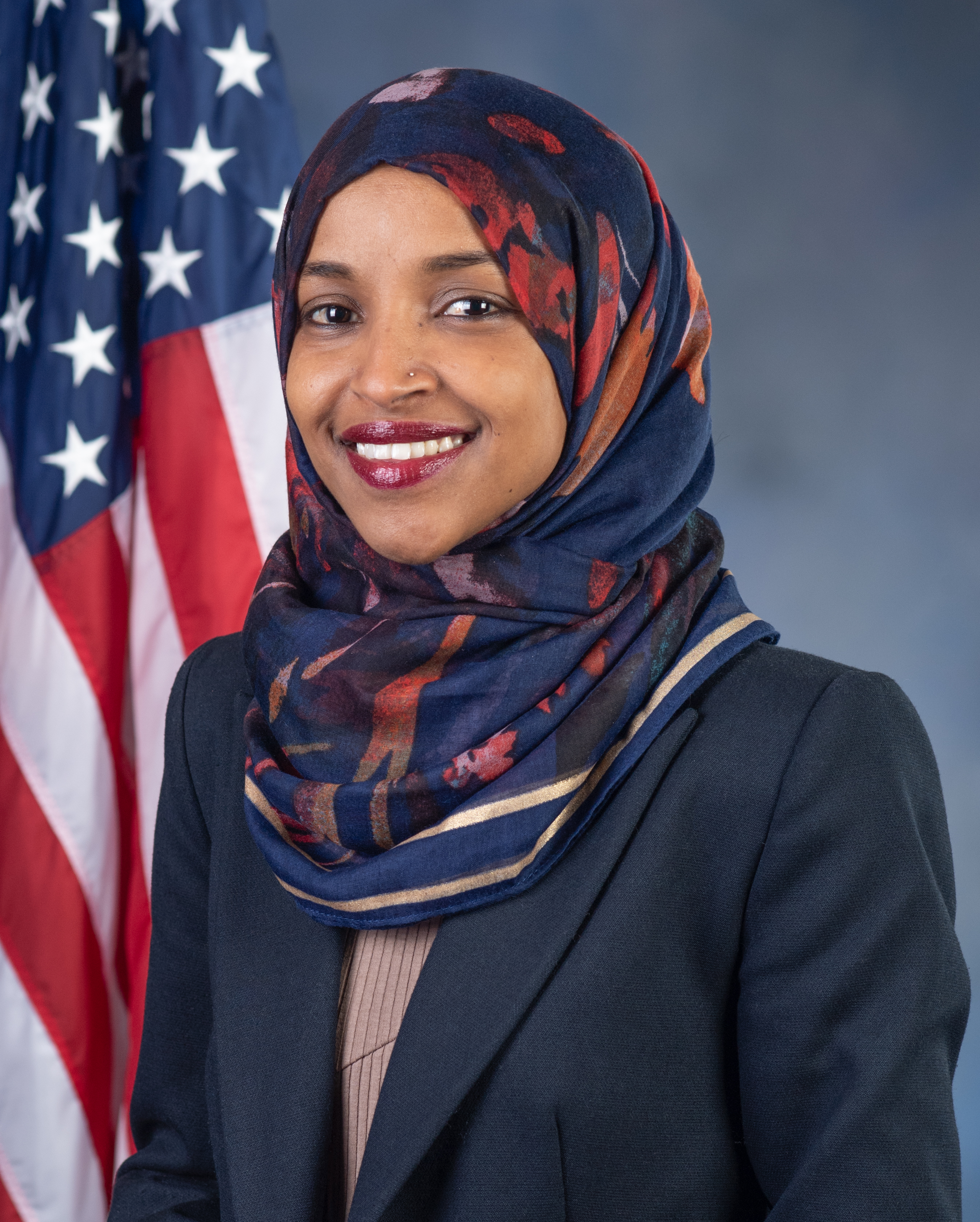
Member of the United States House of Representatives from Minnesota Ilhan Omar

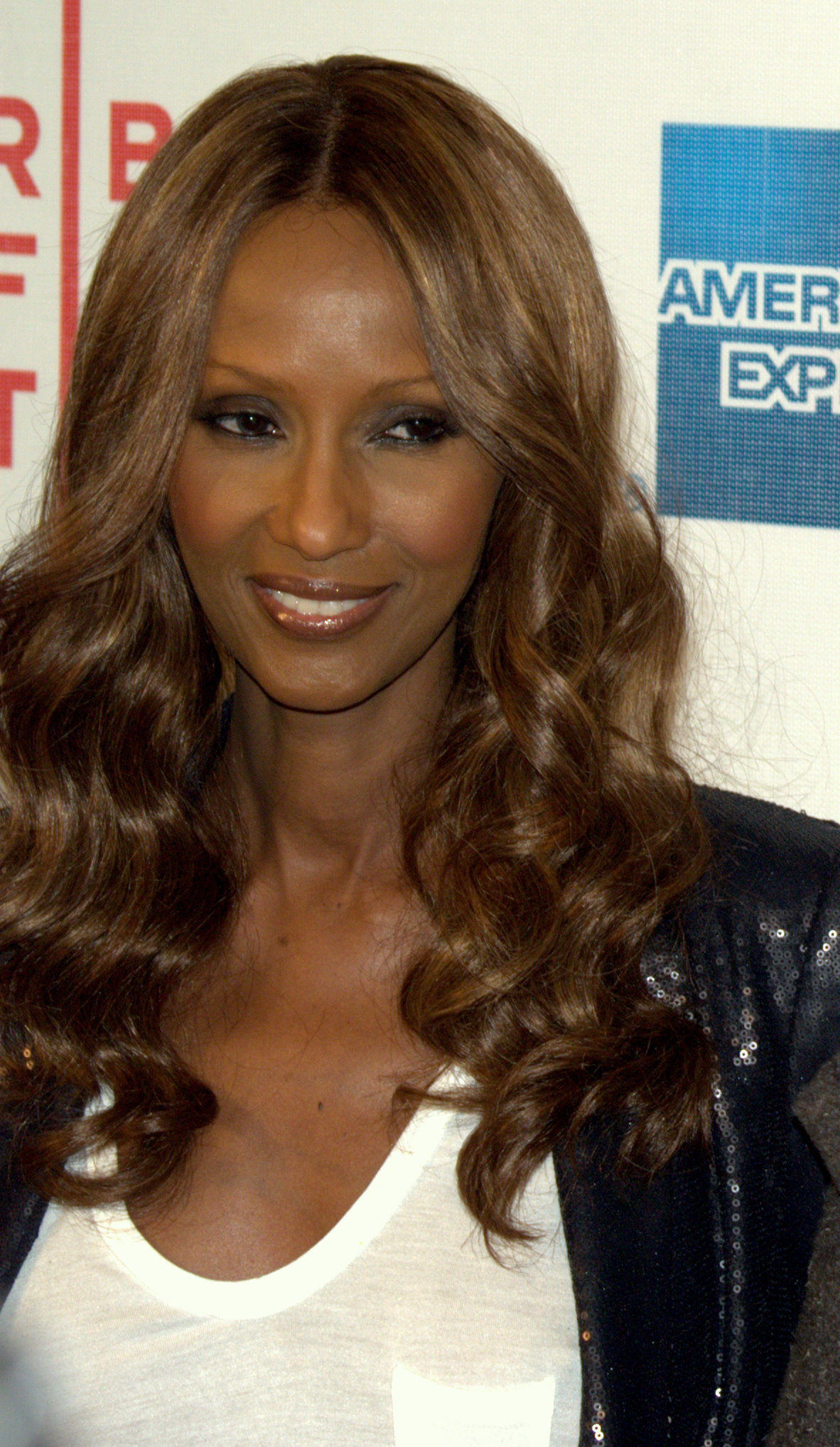
Somali American model Iman

- Mohamed Abdullahi Mohamed, diplomat, professor and politician; former president of Somalia (2017–2022)
- Ilhan Omar, congresswoman, first Somali American elected to US House of Representatives
- Dahir Adan Elmi, chief commander of Somali National Army, 2000s
- Mohammad Ali Samatar, former Somali prime minister 1987–1990
- Ali Khalif Galaydh, Somali politician and former minister, 1980s
- Abdiweli Mohamed Ali, economist, former Somali prime minister
- Abdinur Sheikh Mohamed, educator and politician; former Minister of Education of Somalia
- Abdirahman Duale Beyle, economist; former Minister of Foreign Affairs of Somalia
- Abdisalam Omer, economist; Minister of Foreign Affairs of Somalia
- Abdullahi Ahmed Irro, professor; retired Somali general
- Alisha Boe, actress
- Asha Ahmed Abdalla, politician; former member of the Transitional Federal Parliament
- Asli Hassan Abade, military pilot
- Ayaan Hirsi Ali, writer, political activist, former legislator
- Deqa Dhalac, mayor of South Portland, Maine
- Halima Aden, supermodel
- Hassan Ali Mire, politician; former Minister of Education of Somalia
- Hodan Ahmed, political activist
- Fatima Jibrell, environmental activist; co-founder of Adeso
- Idil Ibrahim, film director, producer and entrepreneur; founder of Zeila Films
- Iman, supermodel, actress and entrepreneur
- Muna Khalif, fashion designer and legislator; MP in Federal Parliament of Somalia
- Musse Olol, social activist; recipient of the 2011 Director's Community Leadership Award
- Nuruddin Farah, writer
- Raqiya Haji Dualeh Abdalla, sociologist and politician; president of the Somali Family Care Network
- Saado Ali Warsame, singer-songwriter and politician
- Said Sheikh Samatar, scholar, historian and writer
- Sofia Samatar, professor, editor and writer

== See also ==
- Somali diaspora
- Dalmar TV, a Somali-language television network
- History of Somalis in Minneapolis–Saint Paul
- Somalia–United States relations
