= Ethiopian war =

Ethiopian War may refer to:

- British Expedition to Abyssinia, a rescue mission and punitive expedition carried out in 1868 by the armed forces of the British Empire against the Ethiopian Empire
- First Italo-Ethiopian War, 1895–1896
- Second Italo-Ethiopian War, 1935–1936
- War in Somalia (2006–2009), phase of the Somali Civil War involving Ethiopia

== See also ==
- Italo-Ethiopian War (disambiguation)
- Ethiopian civil war (disambiguation)
