= Ethiopian civil war (disambiguation) =

The Ethiopian Civil War took place from 1974–1991 between Eritrean and Ethiopian rebels on one side, and the ruling Ethiopian military junta on the other.

Ethiopian civil war or Ethiopian civil conflict may also refer to:

- Battle of Ansata (1270)
- Battles during the Zemene Mesafint (1769–1855)
- Battle of Segale (1916)
- Gugsa Wale's rebellion (1930)
- Eritrean War of Independence (1961–1991)
- Ethiopian civil conflict (2018–present)
  - Tigray war (2022–2022)
  - 2026 Ethiopian offensive

== See also ==
- Ethiopian war (disambiguation)
