= Anti-Somali sentiment =

Racism against Somali people

Global distribution of the Somali people

Anti-Somali sentiment, Somaliphobia, or Somalophobia, refers to fear, hostility, or other negative attitudes towards Somalis or Somali culture.

== Terminology ==
In academic literature, human rights reporting, and media coverage, hostility or prejudice toward Somalis is most commonly referred to as anti-Somali sentiment, anti-Somali rhetoric, or anti-Somali ideology. Less commonly, Somaliphobia, Somalophobia and Somalophobic are also used to describe anti-Somali prejudice.

== Scope ==
=== Africa ===
==== Kenya ====
In 2014 there was a rise of terrorist attacks in Kenya caused by Al-Shabaab, such as the Westgate shopping mall attack. As a result many Kenyans had negative sentiments about Somalis. Since 2014 the Somali community in Kenya has faced marginalization.

==== South Africa ====
The 2000s and early 2010s saw major sporadic outbreaks of violence against Somali shopkeepers in South Africa. This violence has been attributed to jealousy over the large presence of Somali businesses. However, some writers have attributed such hostility to a wider xenophobia, since other non-South Africa Africans were targeted as well.

=== Western world ===
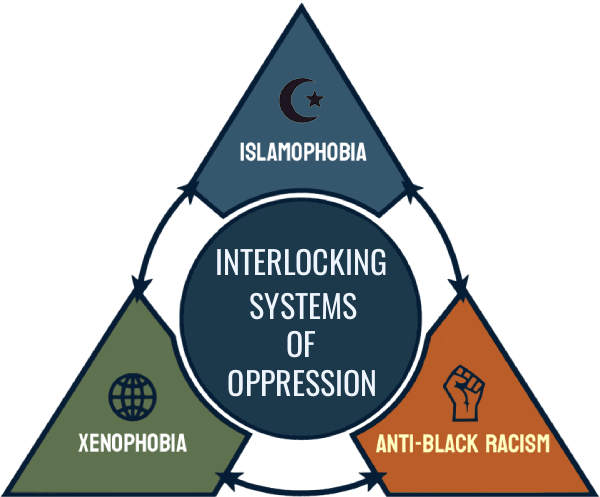
Islamophobia, xenophobia, and anti-Black racism in Somalophobia described as an interlocking systems of oppression.

==== Germany ====
During an interview on Al Jazeera's Head to Head in June 2026, German Alternative for Germany (AfD) politician Maximilian Krah was asked by interviewer Mehdi Hasan which national backgrounds he would consider acceptable under his preferred immigration policy, Krah said he would welcome "10,000 Iranians" into Germany but added, "I don't want to have 10,000 Somalis in Germany."

==== Netherlands ====
In 2003, Mark Rutte, then State Secretary for Social Affairs and Employment, advised municipalities to carry out extra fraud checks on welfare recipients of Somali origin after reports emerged of welfare claims by some who had moved to the United Kingdom for work. The policy, sometimes referred to as the "Somaliëproject" (Somalia Project), involved targeted checks using population registers and led to accusations of ethnic profiling and racial discrimination.

In 2007, the District Court of Haarlem ruled that investigations aimed exclusively at persons of Somali descent constituted racial discrimination and violated Article 1 of the Constitution of the Netherlands. Rutte defended the measures, arguing they were needed to combat fraud and that the law should be changed if it prevented such targeting.

==== Sweden ====
A 2011 report by Centrum mot rasism (CMR), drawing on European Union Minorities and Discrimination Survey (EU-MIDIS) data, documented widespread experiences of racism among people of Somali background.

In 2012, Somali residents in the small town of Forserum in Småland faced systematic harassment and violence from a local youth gang. Incidents included stones being thrown at homes and the Somali association premises, physical assaults, racist insults, and threats against children on their way to school. Many Somali families kept their children home from school out of fear. Out of approximately 160 Somalis living in the town a year earlier, around 95 had left by August 2012 due to the hostile environment. The Somali association advised its members to move, and the case received national media attention after local authorities were criticised for a slow response.

The right-wing populist Sweden Democrats have repeatedly used rhetoric portraying Somali immigration negatively, linking it to welfare dependency, crime, and integration problems. Party figures have referred to a “wave of illiterates from Somalia” and warned against the formation of ethnic enclaves described as “Little Mogadishu”.

==== United States ====
Somali Americans have experienced Anti-Somali sentiment and it is sometimes expressed in the context of anti-immigration sentiment. Anti-Somali sentiments sometimes overlap with Islamophobic sentiments and racism in the United States.

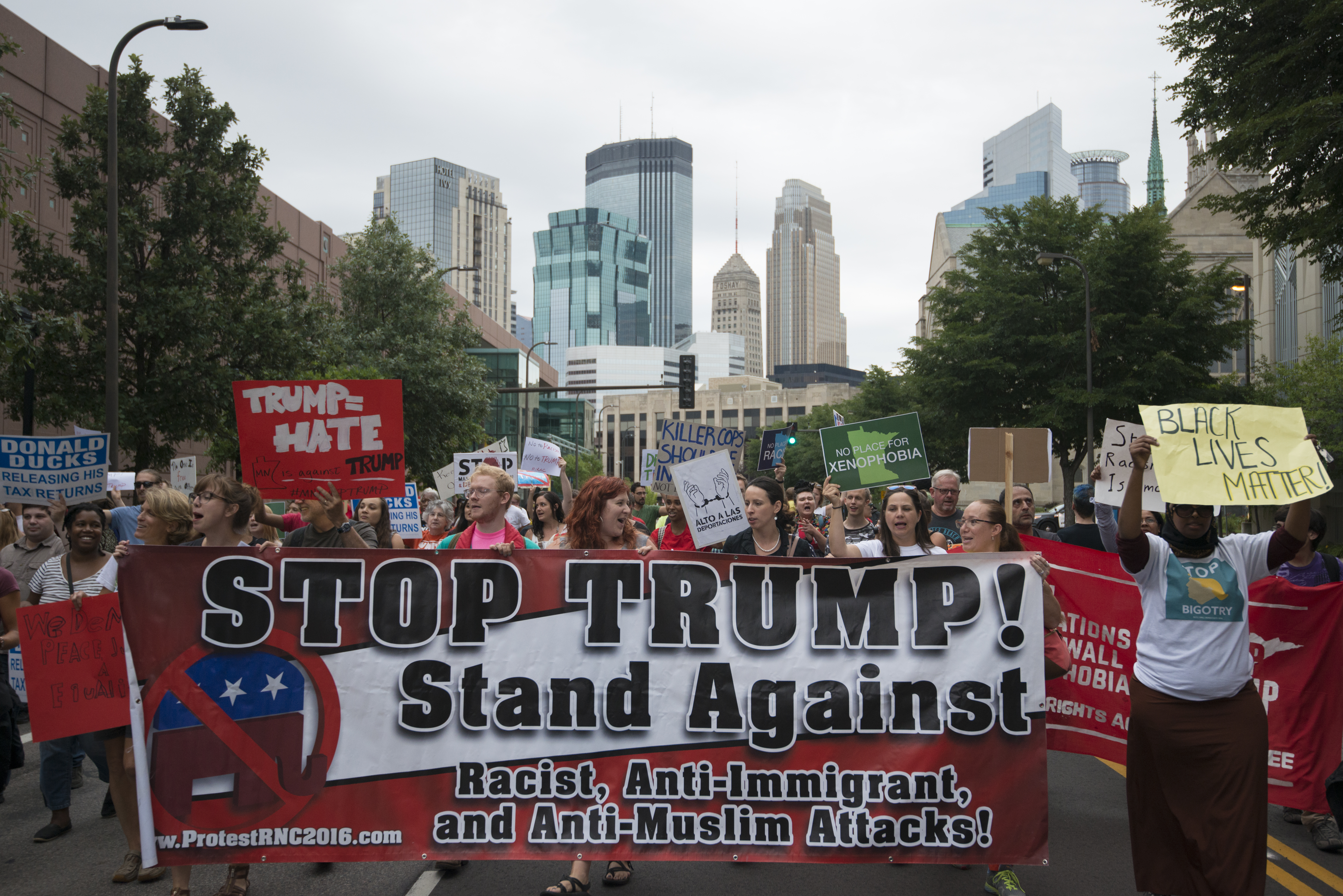
An August 2016 anti-Donald Trump protest in Minneapolis, home to the largest U.S. Somali population, rallying against racism, xenophobia, and Islamophobia.

On 30 October 2015, Asma Jama (a Muslim woman of Somali descent and Kenyan nationality) was viciously beaten for speaking Swahili in an Applebee's on the outskirts of Minneapolis. The perpetrator of that violence was convicted of third-degree assault. In June 2016, two Somalis were shot after wearing their traditional clothing. A week prior to the shooting, a Somali halal shop in the city was vandalized. Minneapolis City Council member Abdi Warsame discussed anti-Somali sentiments in the aftermath of the shooting of Justine Damond by a Somali police officer. In Dodge City, Kansas several Somali men were the victims of hate crimes ranging from racial slurs to serious bodily injury in 2016. Due to the high concentration of Somali-Americans in Minnesota, anti-immigration sentiment has been used as a campaign talking point, including by candidate Donald Trump during his 2024 presidential campaign. After Trump referred to Somalis as garbage and called for the deportation of all people of Somali descent, some female Somali Americans or female Horner Americans in Minnesota stated that they were religiously harassed, and others sexually assaulted by members of the U.S. ICE agency. In the 2020s, the Somali community adjacent to the Dar Al Nur Community Center in Fairfax, Virginia were repeatedly subjected to physical attacks and destruction of property over a three-year period. The Somaliphobic remarks led to a backlash from the Somali-American community and its supporters in Minneapolis, a city that has one of the largest Somali-American populations in the country with civic and business leaders in the city condemning the rhetoric as tarnishing.

In December 2025, a viral video showed an employee at a Cinnabon bakery in Ashwaubenon, Wisconsin, harassing a Somali couple with racial slurs after mocking the woman's hijab. Cinnabon subsequently released a statement on Twitter stating that the employee had been immediately fired, as their actions "do not reflect our values or the welcoming experience every guest deserves". A fundraiser in support of the fired employee later raised nearly $100,000 on GiveSendGo; meanwhile, a GoFundMe set up for the Somali couple raised over $1,000.

On June 6, Somali referee Omar Artan, who had been selected to officiate at the World Cup, was denied entry into the United States upon arrival at Miami International Airport despite holding a valid U.S. visa and a diplomatic passport issued with the assistance of the Somali Embassy in Nairobi. He was subsequently placed on a return flight to Istanbul, from where he had traveled to attend a mandatory FIFA seminar for match officials ahead of the tournament. United States Customs and Border Protection stated that Artan was found inadmissible following inspection due to "vetting concerns" and alleged "association with suspected members of terror organizations". Artan strongly denied any links to terror groups. Upon his return to Somalia on June 10, it was announced that Artan would still receive his full World Cup salary of $100,000 from FIFA, followed by a UEFA announcement the next day confirming he would officiate the upcoming UEFA Super Cup in August, becoming the first ever non-European to officiate the match.

== Abusiveness ==
There are also some pejorative terms that serve to dehumanize Somalis. The term skinnie became popularized with the film Black Hawk Down. The term has been said to allude to reducing Somalis to their humanitarian struggles and National Public Radio has suggested that its usage deprives Somalis of their own point of view. The term Abdi is also sometimes pejoratively used to refer to male Somalis.

The Associated Press's stylebook suggested that Somali is the correct demonym or adjective, rather than Somalian.

== See also ==
- Afrophobia
- Anti-Arabism
- Anti-Ethiopian sentiment
- Islamophobia
