= Ethiopian refugees in Sudan =

Ethiopian refugees seeking refuge in Sudan

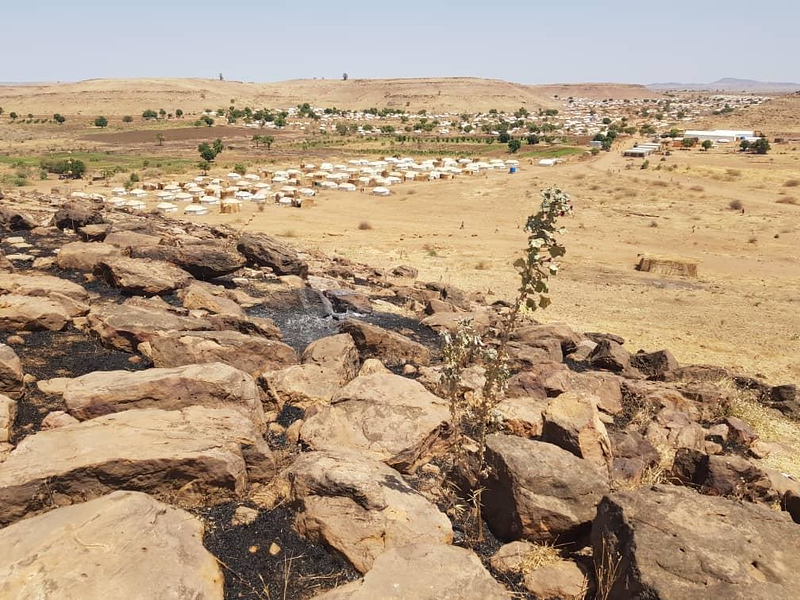
Ethiopian refugee camps near the Ethiopia–Sudan border, March 2021.

Ethiopian refugees in Sudan are individuals from Ethiopia who have sought asylum in Sudan due to various reasons, including the two-year civil war in the Tigray region and other challenging circumstances in Ethiopia.

== Origins ==
The history of Ethiopian refugees in Sudan dates back to the 1970s. Many Ethiopians were forced to flee their country due to acts of repression following the usurpation of political power in Ethiopia by the army in 1974. The 1974 Sudan Asylum Act significantly impacted Ethiopian refugees, as it restricted their ability to seek employment or leave their designated refugee camps, a situation that was similar for Eritrean refugees arriving since the 1960s.

In the 1980s, a severe drought in the Horn of Africa, particularly in Ethiopia, led to a mass exodus of around 300,000 Ethiopians seeking refuge in Sudan. Over the years, Ethiopians have continued to flee to Sudan for various reasons, including escaping political persecution, guerrilla warfare, and military conscription. Some have crossed the border seeking to reunite with family members, while others have moved in search of employment opportunities or to participate in integration programs designed to help them establish their own businesses and livelihoods. Additionally, widespread famine in Ethiopia and political issues related to the Tigray People's Liberation Front prompted a significant number of Ethiopian refugees to seek safety in Sudan in 1984.

== Recent challenges ==
The refugees face legal challenges under Sudan's 2014 Regulation of Asylum Act, which, despite being progressive, has significant gaps. For example, refugees must register within 30 days of arrival, a process complicated by various factors such as fear of authority. Restrictions on freedom of movement within Sudan further exacerbate their plight.

Since November 2020, Sudan has been grappling with a substantial influx of refugees, primarily due to the conflict in the Tigray region of Ethiopia. The tensions between the Ethiopian government and the Tigray People's Liberation Front have forced thousands to flee, with an expected influx of 200,000 refugees over six months. Many Ethiopian refugees have reported the use of smugglers for entering Sudan, and there have been serious issues of human trafficking, including kidnappings and abductions, particularly in eastern Sudan.

The sudden increase in refugee numbers has put a strain on resources in Sudan, leading to difficulties in providing adequate food, shelter, and healthcare services in refugee camps. An outbreak of Hepatitis E virus (HEV) infections was reported among Ethiopian refugees in humanitarian camps in Gedaref State, Sudan, exacerbated by poor sanitation and hygiene conditions.

== International response ==
The European Union has responded to the crisis of Ethiopian refugees in Sudan due to the conflict in the Tigray region. EU Commissioner for Crisis Management, Janez Lenarčič, visited the border areas in Sudan and Khartoum, signaling the EU's commitment to humanitarian support and Sudan's political transition. His visit included meetings with Sudanese leadership and representatives of humanitarian organizations, and he planned to meet Ethiopian Minister of Peace, Muferiat Kamil, in Addis Ababa, highlighting the EU's comprehensive approach to the crisis.

Financially, the EU has contributed significantly to assist both Ethiopia and Sudan. A €70 million contribution was made to the Sudan Family Support Programme to support Sudan's economic reforms and alleviate the impact of the pandemic on Sudanese families, part of the larger ‘Team Europe' response totaling €230 million. Additionally, the EU allocated an extra €4 million in emergency humanitarian assistance for Ethiopian refugees fleeing the Tigray conflict, bringing its total humanitarian aid for Sudan to €65.5 million in 2020.
