= Persecution of Amhara people =

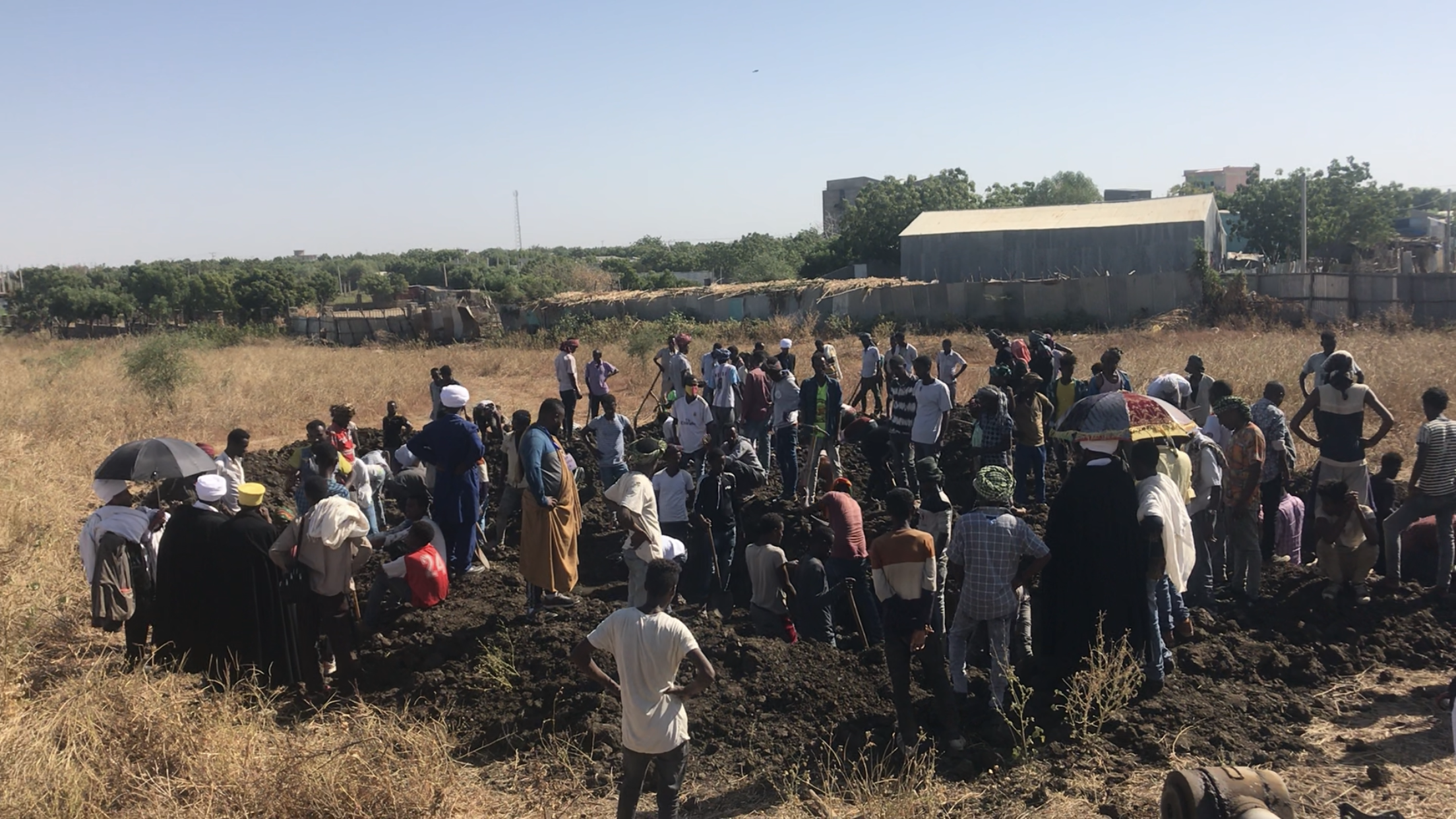
- Funeral services for the victims of mass murders in the city of Maikadra
- Native name: የዐማራውን ዘር የማጥፋት ጭፍጨፋ በኢትዮጵያ
- Date: 1990s–present
- Time: Ongoing
- Duration: Ongoing
- Location: Ethiopia; Oromia and formerly Hararghe Province; Welkait; Benishangul-Gumuz (Metekel Zone); Sidama Region; Central Ethiopia Regional State; South West Ethiopia Peoples' Region; South Ethiopia Regional State; Amhara region
- Type: Ethnically targeted massacres; Ethnically motivated mass violence; Ethnic federalism and restructuring; Forced assimilation; Annexation; Ethnic cleansing
- Motive: Anti-Amhara sentiment, anti-Orthodox Tewahedo sentiment, ethnic federalism, ethnic nationalism
- Participants: Oromo Liberation Army; Qeerroo youth groups; Tigray People's Liberation Front (TPLF); TDF and Pro-TPLF groups (Mai Kadra massacre); Gumuz extremist militiamen in Benishangul-Gumuz/Metekel; Others in the former SNNPR; Alleged state collaborators
- Outcome: Series of massacres; 3,283 civilian casualties; 11 million+ in need of food aid, 2 million+ displaced; Widespread rape, weaponized sexual & gender-based violence, induced infertility; Destruction of many villages, towns, cities, harvest, farm animals

Since the early 1990s, the Amhara people of Ethiopia have been subject to ethnic violence, including massacres by Tigrayan, Oromo and Gumuz groups along with others, which have characterized by some as a genocide. Perpetrators of massacres include various ethno-militant groups such as TPLF/TDF, OLF–OLA, and armed groups of Gumuz.

Ethnically motivated attacks against the Amhara have been reported, with mass graves having been discovered in various locations. The results of two consecutive National Census Analyses and a report by CSA head Samia Zekaria revealed that over 2 million Amhara could not be traced. The figure could be associated with massacres and or disappearances of Amharas.

The Tigrayan People's Liberation Front (TPLF) among other groups were formed in the 1970s with a manifesto calling for Tigray to secede from Ethiopia. Previous resentments between ethnic Tigray and Amhara rulers were reported. The Tigray manifesto is criticized for incorporating polarizing contents that symbolize the Amhara people as the responsible ethnic group for socio-economical, and country-level political and historical issues. Violence against ordinary Amhara, its intellectuals, and civic leaders started in the early 1990s, with armed ethnonationalist groups occupying many parts of the country.

After the fall of the Derg regime in 1991, various ethnonationalist groups such as the TPLF came to power. As a result, this regime change triggered a series of attacks against the Amhara. The TPLF would go on to become the dominant power and ruled the country for 27 years as the EPRDF coalition, until the end of EPRDF rule in 2018.

Following the dissolution of the EPRDF, the House of Peoples' Representatives would elect Abiy Ahmed to serve Prime Minister. Abiy would found the Prosperity Party which would go on to lead the country. A power struggle would occur between the ruling Prosperity Party and the TPLF, which led to the Tigray War. Reports show that a pro-TPLF youth group carried out the massacre of Amhara civilians in the town of Mai-Kadra. Following the Tigray Defense Forces recapture of most of Tigray, leading to the subsequent withdrawal of government forces, the TDF invaded the Amhara and the Afar regions in July 2021. The Mai Kadra and other massacres in the Amhara region that occurred since the start of the war has expanded the map and volume of the mass killings the already occurring violations in various places such as Oromia, Benishangul-Gumuz (Metekel Zone), Tigray, the former SNNPR, and the Amhara region.

== Background ==
The Amhara and Agew peoples coexisted and shared historical and cultural values for centuries. Similar to other Ethiopian nationals, both groups contributed to building the nation, made contributions to the nation's long historical accounts, and they now live in most parts of Ethiopia. Since agriculture is the main source of food in the country, Amhara and Agew farmers earn income from producing staple crops. Due to the frequent drought occurrence, they are, however, stricken by poverty— more than 80% of them are traditional farmers. In some instances, these groups are misrepresented as Orthodox Christians, although, significant proportion of them are Muslims. Both groups have been exposed to similar existential risks— including the systematic massacres and crimes disclosed in this article. However, claims of genocide against the Agew people requires an independent report.

== Perpetrators ==
The controversial section in the 1994 constitution, ethnic self-determination to secede from the nation, is described by experts as the root cause of ethnic-based violence in the country. Reports discussed that the perpetrators were generally organized, in some cases they can be identified by the victims, and in others, the attackers were unknown to them. The actors demonstrated mixed motives: ethnic origin (with these common religions in Ethiopia: Christian, Muslim and Jews), religious origin (Orthodox Christians), or both. The armed groups mobilize from region to region with alleged collaboration with local government officials, and are from these groups

- Ethnic Oromo militant perpetrators such as the OLA (former military wing of the OLF) also known as Shane or Oneg. The Qeerroo youth groups are also accused of collaborating with these groups
- The Tigrayan actors such as the TPLF, TDF and pro-TPLF youth groups in the annexed, and various places in Amhara region
- Gumuz actors in the Metekel Zone which is in the Benishangul-Gumuz region.
- Other actors in the Southern SNNPR region and other places

== Timeline ==
The four major Amhara genocidal timelines include:

1. The rebel movements can be characterized as Manifesto preparation period that influenced the ethnic federalist constitution, with campaigns, reprisal, and guerrilla wars
2. The launch of massacres across many regions under Tigray Region and the TPLF regime that ruled Ethiopia from 1991 to 2018
3. The scaled-up simultaneous mass killings in many regions under the Oromo-led Prosperity Party ruling began in 2018, and
4. Expansion of Amhara mass killings with the Tigray War since November 2020

== Pre-1991: The manifesto rhetoric and historical accounts ==
There are over eighty ethnic groups in Ethiopia that have been living together through history. In the 1970s the ethno-nationalist insurgents were created under the TPLF leadership with Marxist–Leninist manifesto seeking Autonomy, Self-Rule, and for some, Hegemony. The groups were the TPLF (Tigrayan People's Liberation Front), OLF (Oromo Liberation Front), EPLF (Eritrean People's Liberation Front), and WSLF (Western Somali Liberation Front). The doctrine consists of anti-Amhara rhetoric that portrays the group as the all-time-sole-ruler. However, the divisive narratives are disapproved by most and taken as the political mechanism used to introduce ethnic sensitivities. For leadership in the southeastern and southwestern parts of Ethiopia, history reflects that those with Oromo or the assimilated Oromized backgrounds exercised ruling outside of their traditional jurisdictions including in the partial northcentral part of the country where most Amhara and others lived. Records show that the era of Zemene Mesafint and onwards central governance was diverse. The aggression of the Oromo that followed the Islamic invasions in the 16th century and subsequent Oromo settlements to central Ethiopia brought some changes to parts of the historical jurisdictions occupied by others— renaming of lands and rivalry. The documented Oromo assimilation and expansion mechanisms involve "Mogassa and Gudifecha", typically described by the member of the group as methods of "adopting" other ethnic groups. The controversial assimilating process involves the unbreakable oath: to hate what the group hate; to like what the group like; to fight what the group fight; to go where the group goes; to chase what the group chases.

There are over fifty six ethnic constituents who have been living in the southern regions. The groups practice ancient customs to elect their leaders and generally maintained traditions. Historians recorded exceptional cases in which several tribes were assimilated into the Oromo group. In general terms, natural ethnic tensions and ruling rivalries occurred in the country throughout history. However, the complex groups developed traditional approaches to coexisting. Despite ethnic differences, intermarriages and collaborative customs between the various groups have been practiced in most instances. Reports show that these constituents united when external threats were projected against the country.

== 1991– 2018: TPLF rule and Article 39 ==
In 1991, the TPLF-dominated ruling was established as the EPRDF coalition with a new constitution and subsequent regional demarcations. The controversial Article 39, Nations, Nationalist, and People Self-determination is part of the constitution and grants rights for any ethnic group to secede and form a Nation. During this period, polarizing contents were thought of in schools and promoted through the system.

=== Annexations ===
The Greater Tigray autonomy that was designed by the TPLF involved the annexation of lands from neighboring former provinces of Gonder and Wollo, with a coastal possession strategy from Eritrea. Immediately after TPLF secured governmental power in 1991, the Raya-Alamata and Welkait were annexed into the Tigray region. These lands have been ruled as southern and western parts of Tigray for three decades. Following the outbreak of the Tigray War, Amhara forces occupied these disputed territories – with reported tension in these area. Metekel is also another strategic land from the point of view of accessing the Nile river and annexed to the Benishangul-Gumuz region from the former Gojjam Province. Similarly, the Dera and surrounding lands in Shewa, Amhara region are also forcefully administered under the Oromia region following the Oromo-led ruling since 2018. These annexations are protested by the Amhara and described as systematic measures taken for accessing various resources in the Amhara region. One instance is the Tana Beles national project which incorporated the Lake Tana, and Beles rivers of the Nile— both in the Amhara region. In addition, the GERD became the largest Nile hydroelectric project with significant geopolitical influence on the Horn of Africa. With the ongoing large-scale mass violence against the Amhara and Agew who live in the annexed regions, many expressed grave concerns about the lack of political and economic representations and fear for their security.

=== Massacres and crackdowns ===
The 27-year rule of the TPLF regime has been characterized as a repressive system with many forms of massacres, enforced disappearances, and systematic destructive measures taken against the Amhara, and other ethnic groups. Reports showed that mass killings of the Amhara started in the Assosa zone of the Benishangul-Gumuz region in the Metekel zone (which was then part of Gojjam Province) in 1990. After the 1991 power control by the TPLF and insurgents, mass violence and crackdowns on Amhara intellectuals and its public figures launched. A political opponent who was also a medical professor and surgeon, Asrat Woldeyes was imprisoned and abused along with other members of the All Amhara People Organization (AAPO) civic group. The cause of the elderly doctor Asrat's death is associated with the lack of timely medical treatment following the abuse that he endured during and after his imprisonments. TPLF ruled the country for nearly three decades with multiple rigged elections that led to mass violence and killings of innocent people in Addis Ababa, abuses, and torture against journalists and public figures in various regions, including in the Amhara region. See Massacres by region, for locations of crimes across Ethiopia.

== 2018— present: Transition to the Oromo-Led Prosperity Party ==
Reports showed that many hoped for peace when the TPLF regime was replaced with a new Prime minister, Abiy Ahmed, who was also the 2019 Nobel Peace prize awardee. He came to power from the Oromo Democratic Party (ODP)— that he has been serving as the chairman. Many of the expressed concerns over his administration include domination of Oromo-based power in his council, ministerial and parliamentary circles, impunity of perpetrators, with concerns over repressive ruling as in the case of the TPLF's authoritarian regime. As of July 6, 2022, this period is active with large scale massacres in Wollega, Oromia— see the Amhara massacres in 2022–2023.

=== State incitements ===
Oromia reportedly became one of the hostile regions for the Amhara to live in, since the ethno-nationalist insurgents took power in 1991, but more so, since the new Oromo-led regime came to power in 2018. Abiy's governmental decision to bring the exiled and fully armed Oromo rebels back and controversial diaspora activists was condemned for lack of disarming measures and for subsequent widespread hate speeches against the Amhara. This event led to the parallel Amhara mass killings in various locations. The OLA, which was formerly the military wing of the OLF – carried out similar massacres in the 1990s. In addition, the polarizing and open remarks made at a large Oromo public gathering by the Oromia President, Mr. Shimelis Abdissa heavily criticized. His speech, "We broke the Neftegna or Amhara" was broadcast on national television. Such incitements are believed to be the reasons for the launch of waves of violence against Amhara in many regions, with no obvious punitive measures and the lack of formal acknowledgments from officials. See The June 14th Parliamentary speeches, for another reported instance of politically charged statement given by Abiy Ahmed Ali.

=== The Burayu and Shashemene massacres ===
These are selected cases from the series of Amhara mass murders— see Massacres by region for locations of crimes across Ethiopia. The Burayu massacre occurred on the outskirt of Addis Ababa in September 2018. The Oromo Querro youth groups reportedly carried out the mass violence against non-Oromo residents from the Dorzes, Gamos, and other ethnicities including the Amhara. This was one of the first violence that occurred after Abiy took power. Reports show that the perpetrators demonstrated mixed motives— ethnic origin, religious origin, or both. For the 2019 Shashemene massacre in Oromia, witness statements revealed that the attacking mobs were coordinated. Primarily the Amhara, and Orthodox Christians from other ethnic groups— from Guraghe, Wolayita, Tigrayans, Oromo, and others were murdered in this violence. Due to these mass killings, Christian religious leaders were abused and killed, churches turned to ashes, and treasures and literary works were destroyed. Similar heinous acts were orchestrated in many regions by the various perpetrators. Statements disclosed that the killers demanded conversion to Islam when executing Orthodox Christians from Amhara.

This was followed by mass violence following the assassination of an ethnic Oromo singer, Hachalu Hundessa, in 2020. Although the ethnic origin of the shooter was not disclosed at the time of the attack, Oromo youth mobilized and started to attack Amhara civilians blaming them for the death of the singer - demonstrating pre-meditated and coordinated violences against Amhara and Orthodox groups. As a result of this mass violence, over 200 people were massacred by armed Oromo groups with no clear punitive measures. The government accused OLA rebels for these massacres.

=== Abductions and massacres ===
Another mass murder occurred in Oromia when a controversial Oromo political elite, Jawar Mohammed, made a social media call to his supporters, complaining government's decision to remove the personal guards assigned to him. Following his call at night, organized Oromo actors came out and reportedly massacred Amhara— at least 86 people were killed. In parallel to the mass killings in Oromia, the abduction of 17 University Amhara students in 2019 by the OLA from Dembi Dolo University, and in other places were also reported. The families of these girls communicated that their children never returned. As of May 2022, this case remained open with no obvious action from officials. Other forms of abductions include— Amhara kidnapping in Wollega, Oromia, and other OLA targeted parts of the Amhara region. In addition, a series of mass killings and displacements of Amhara, Agew, and other groups, have been reported in the Benishangul-gumuz & Metekel, and the Southern SNNP regions. These are selected cases from the series of Amhara mass murders in various regions— see Massacres by region for locations of crimes across Ethiopia.

=== The Ataye massacre ===
Multiple attacks have been launched by the OLA and other Oromo militant groups with aggression into the Amhara Region in North Shewa— in Efrata Ena Gidim, and Kewet districts. The attacks included door-to-door mass executions in Ataye, Shewa Robit, Jewuha, Senbete, Majete, Molale, and the surrounding villages. Ataye was once a vibrant Amhara business and a tourist town before the series of attacks carried out in late 2020. The three consecutive mass violence within a short time reportedly ruined the majority of the city.

Ataye was in the process of recovery from the Ataye clashes when it faced its the third destruction as a result of the TDF-OLA joint offensive that occurred in November 2021. Similarly, Majete and the surrounding towns were reportedly pillaged frequently by the OLA militants. Witness statements revealed that perpetrators were equipped with snipers and artillery when attacking ethnic Amhara civilians. Surviving IDPs reported systematic collaborations between the killers and alleged state officials. These frequent attacks in the Northern Shewa are associated with acts of expansion and ethnic cleansing.

In April 2021 a series of demonstrations were held in the Amhara region with a lead slogan, Beka or በቃ or NoMore, asking government officials for protective measures— for the waves of Amhara massacres that occurred in many locations. In response to these events, arbitrary detention and abuses were reported. These are selected cases from the series of Amhara mass murders in various regions— see Massacres by region for locations of crimes across Ethiopia.

=== Annexation, ethnic restructuring and violence in Addis Ababa ===
At the start of the 2018 Prosperity ruling, attacks in and around Addis Ababa, the Capital of Ethiopia, began with the Burayu mass killings of non-Oromo residents, which caused many to flee the area. Forced removal of the Amhara, property destructions, mass Oromo transfer from other areas with settlement programs, frequent attacks against residents by the Oromo Querro youth, police shootings, murders, and abuses of those turnout to public and religious celebrations, with plain Green-Yellow-Red tri-color cloth or items, are some of the reported violence against citizens. Serious concerns have been expressed against the controversial and aggressive annexation mechanisms imposed on the Capital Addis Ababa— to annex it to the Oromia region. Analyses indicated that the "special interest" claims of the Oromo regime is tied with terms agreed upon between some ethno-nationalist groups before coming to power. Some of the actions include the enforcement of new policies and systematic administrative changes to Addis Ababa and its surrounding jurisdictions. These measures have faced resistance from residents, and civil voices— the Balderas Party. Previously disclosed annexations following the Tigray regional demarcation included forceful integrations of Welkait and Raya-Alamata to Tigray, the Metekel zone to Benishangul-Gumuz, and Dera, to the Oromia region. See The June 14th Parliamentary speeches, that is described as politically charged statements given by Abiy Ahmed Ali against Addis Ababa.

== 2020—present: Tigray War ==
Reports show that the scale of Amhara mass murders in the high-risk Oromia and Benishangul-Gumuz regions intensified with the parallel Tigray War that began in November 2020. At the beginning of the war, the Samri youth group reportedly executed between 600 and 1500 ethnic Amhara civilians in the town of Mai-Kadra. After 9 months of fighting in the Tigray region, the Tigray Defense Forces retook most of Tigray and advanced towards and invaded the neighbouring Amhara and Afar regions in July 2021— massacring civilians in the occupied areas. Reports uncover that villages burned down, various forms of sexual violence committed against women and children, livestock killed, institutions and service centers ransacked, and harvests burned down. Over 2 million Amhara IDPs fled to the south but case reports showed that those who stayed behind were gang-raped at gunpoint, looted, and abused. Witness accounts also exposed that Tigray rebels coerced Amhara children as frontline war shields. The government was criticized for underestimating the Tigray forces, and announcing victory while the attacks continued in both Amhara and Afar regions.

=== Strategic retreat directives ===
The Amhara militias such as Fano and other forces who fought against the Tigrayan rebels in the Amhara region stated that they were ambushed with military directives, which led the TDF forces to advance. Some of the accusations include Oromo extremists' infiltration into key federal military positions. Questionable commands including for fighters to retreat south, leaving weapons and armored vehicles behind, were heavily criticized. In December 2021, numerous international organizations made calls to their citizens for urgent evacuation from Ethiopia, while the TDF moved towards Addis Ababa. In Wollo, North Shewa, and the Afar region, the TDF and the Oromo Liberation Army carried out joint mass attacks against Afar and Amhara people. With no cost one can put on the lives of many innocent people, recovery from the brutal destructions in both regions is estimated to take years.

=== Afar and the Southern groups ===
In July 2021, the TDF began shelling the Afar region to control the strategic route connecting to the Djiboutian border but faced heavy resistance. Repeated attacks were launched against Afar pastoralists, civilians mass murdered, many have been raped, towns and villages looted, institutions ransacked, with cases of weapon-induced body burns of children. Following the withdrawal of Tigrayan forces, reports covered that the TDF discarded explosives in public areas— resulting in numerous deaths and injuries of children in the Afar Region. The war crimes and other grave human rights violations against the Afar people require an independent article or report.

Of the eighty ethnicities in Ethiopia, the Amhara and the Oromo are the most populous groups. However, most southern ethnic groups are relatively small in number, and lack representations in the political space and the military structure. Therefore, they remain at risk of silent atrocities and possible cultural genocide. The Tigrayan minority, however, dominated government power and ruled the country for twenty-seven years from 1991 to 2018. In addition to the massacres against the Amhara and Afar people, the TPLF regime reportedly committed the Gambela massacre, against the Anuak minority in 2003, and massacres in Ogaden during the insurgency. With the new Oromo-led regime from 2018 onwards, serious concerns have been expressed for the Amaro or Korre ethnic groups and other southerners with numerous killings against these groups, and the violation of coercing the minorities under the Oromo assimilation mechanisms.

== The alleged crimes against the Amhara ==
The three decades-long alleged crimes against the Amhara may fall under the definition of genocide according to the UN Genocide Convention and the ICC Rome Statute articles.

=== I. Genocidal Acts (Article 6 of the Rome Statute) ===
Across many regions, ethnically motivated, targeted, and organized gruesome mass killings have been committed against the Amhara— causing serious bodily and mental harm using rape, sexual and gender-based violence, enforced pregnancy, and other forms of attacks. Manner of killings includes dismemberment, immolation, point-blank executions, and enforced miscarriages with lacerations, and creating deplorable living conditions in the annexed and outside of the Amhara region by preventing them from accessing medical treatments. Other acts include the enforced removal of Amhara through evictions, burning of their homes and their harvest, and looting of farm animals with the destruction of hospitals, schools, water sources, and other necessities. Additionally, witnesses reported prohibition from speaking and learning their language in the annexed and other regions.

=== II. Crimes Against Humanity (Article 7 of the Rome Statute) ===
In Mai-Kadra, a Tigrayan militia ordered the Amhara to stay in the house before they were mass murdered and looted. Researchers from Gondar University exhumed bodies in thousands in Welkait where the territory was annexed and under the control of the Tigray Region. Additional mass graves of the Amhara exist in various regions and awaiting exhumation. In many of the places, survivor statements revealed that perpetrators were coordinated, organized and brought name lists when carrying out door-to-door executions. In most of the violence, ethnic Amhara have been separated from other groups and executed— both Muslims and Christians were murdered and buried together against their religious practices. In other cases, the perpetrators targeted Orthodox Christians. The Amhara are victims of abduction, enforced removal and disappearance, detention, torture, enslavement, and blockades. Rape, sexual violence, and enforced pregnancy and targeted infertility sterilization cases are also reported. Deplorable living conditions were created against the group causing preventable death by exposing them to high-risk infectious environments and denying malaria treatments and other critical medical care. Other systematic oppressions such as persecution, physical and mental abuses with arbitrary imprisonments are reported.

=== III. War Crimes (Article 8 of the Rome Statute) ===
In addition to the Mai-Kadra massacre, Tigray forces invaded Amhara and executed civilians since June 2021. with cases accompanied by sadistic acts, physical abuse and torture, and verbal abuse or dehumanization including regular use of ethnic slurs and humiliation which inflicted irreparable physical and psychological trauma on survivors. Numerous victims died as a result of this specific violence. In addition, civilian properties were pillaged, and schools and health facilities, villages, towns, cities, farm animals, harvests, and religious institutions were ransacked. Witness accounts also exposed Tigray rebels for coercing Amhara children as frontline war shields. The Oromo OLF-OLA armed groups created an alliance with the Tigray TPLF rebels and pillaged many Amhara and Afar towns. In addition to civilians mass murders, the attacks caused the displacement of millions of Amhara, Agew, and Afar people with over 11 million Amhara seeking urgent needs. Mass graves of the victims were discovered and being exhumed in many shelled towns and villages.

==== Partial list of massacres by Tigrayan forces ====
The massacres perpetrated by the TPLF are organized by location from North Gondar to North Shewa zones of the Amhara Region

1. Chenna massacre
2. Mai Kadra massacre
3. Kobo massacre
4. North-Gonder: Aderkay massacre
5. North-Gonder: Debark massacre, Deria Debark massacre
6. South-Gonder: Debretabor massacre
7. South-Gonder: Gayint area massacres(Este massacre, Farta massacre, Guna Begemider/Gassey massacre)
8. Wag Hemra massacre (Tsagbji Tsata massacre, Qedamit massacre)
9. North-Wollo: Raya Kobo massacre (Kobo town massacre, Gobeye massacre, 027 Keble massacre, Aradum massacre, Nigus Galle massacre, Ayub Village massacre)
10. North-Wollo: Raya Alamata massacre (Waja massacre)
11. North-Wollo: Woldya massacre (Piassa massacre, Hamusit massacre, Tinfaz massacre)
12. North-Wollo: Wadla Gashena massacre, Delanta Beklo Manekia massacre, Flakit massacre, Meket massacre
13. North-Wollo: Hara Gubalafto massacre
14. North-Wollo: Habru Wurgessa massacre, Libo massacre, Mersa massacre
15. North-Wollo: Wuchale massacre, Haik massacre
16. South-Wollo: Dessie Zuria massacre, Jama and Kalla massacre, Kutaber massacre, Legambo massacre, Tenta massacre, Woreillu massacre
17. South-Wollo: Kombolcha massacre, Kalu massacre, Tehuledere massacre, Worebabo massacre
18. North-Shewa: Antsokiya Gemza Massacre
19. North-Shewa: Debre Sina massacre, Shew Robit massacre

==== A partial list of massacres in the Afar region by Tigray forces ====
1. Galikoma massacre

== Massacres by region ==
The Table covers most locations of the mass violence against the Amhara people in Ethiopia. Due to the scale and the dynamic nature of the massacre, the list requires frequent updating.

Region or Province	Zone, District, or County
Oromia, Hararghe and Western Shewa	Wollega: East Wollega, West Wollega,Horo Gudru, Kelem East Hararghe:Gelemso, Anchar, Daro Lebu, Wefi Dance and others West Hararghe: Gara Muleta, Asebot Monastery, Gelemso, Bedeno, Weter and others Dire Dawa Arusi or Arsi: Shashemene, Arba Gugu and others Bale Jimma Ambo and its surroundings
Benishangul-Gumuz	Assosa Metekel Kamashi
Annexed-lands in Tigray	Welkait: Mai-Kadra and others
Amhara: War-related and other situations	North Shewa: Efratana Gidim, Kewet, Antsokiya Gemzu, and others Gonder: Gonder city, North and South Gonder Gojjam: Bahir Dar city and others Bethe-Amhara Wollo: North and South Wollo
Southern SNNPR	Gura Ferda: Bench–Sheko and others
Others	Gambela Somali

== National and international reactions ==
Reports of the Ethiopian Human Rights Commission are generally taken as credible with some questions of independence. On the other hand, the state-owned media are criticized for selectively covering atrocities committed by the opposing Tigray forces while excluding the massacres carried out by the Oromo and Gumuz perpetrators. Other independent voices that expose the mass violence by all perpetrator groups are frequently arrested and persecuted.

In previous cases, high-level coverages were given by international groups on OLA (which was then the military wing of the OLF) atrocities it had perpetrated against the Amhara people in Arba Gugu, Bedeno, Harer, and across the Oromia region in the 1990s. However, the violations since 2018 received generally low coverage and inadequate preventative campaigns with delayed responses for Amhara, Agew, and Afar IDP cases. Related to the Tigray War, major international media and rights groups were expelled from the country. Government accusations include disinformation and misleading social media propaganda. In addition, war and other reports of the Amnesty International and Human Rights Watch groups have been criticized for quality and reportedly biased statements released in favor of the Tigray rebels. In some cases, international reports with unverified information were released.

In another case, social media censorship and account suspensions with organized reporting brought challenges to several activists. However, similar platforms were abused for hate incitements. One of the 2019 mass killings of the Amhara in the Oromia region was triggered after a social media call made by an Oromo activist, Jawar Mohammed. Following his post at night, organized Oromo actors stormed out and reportedly murdered at least 86 people, mostly Amhara.

=== The NoMore campaign ===
In April 2021, the Amhara human rights demonstrations took place in the region using a social movement slogan, Beka or በቃ or NoMore. In late 2021, the same slogan has been used by Pan-African activists to campaign against Western measures on the ruling Prosperity Party— protesting the HR 6600 and other United States resolutions and bills. However, the victim side criticized the movement as a state funded, politically motivated, selective campaign that neglected the mass violence and abuses against the Amhara in the country. This movement reportedly reduced its effort following the release of high-profile TPLF and OLF political prisoners with amnesty in January 2022— with possible peace negotiation between the ruling Prosperity party, TPLF and the OLA. However, questions have been raised about the nature of the negotiation with the same groups who have already been designated as terrorist groups by the Ethiopian government.

== Amhara massacres in 2022–2023 ==
=== The June 14th Parliamentary speeches ===
Prime Minister Abiy Ahmed Ali addressed the Ethiopian parliament on June 14, 2022, just four days before the waves of the Amhara massacres in various zones and villages in Wollega, the Oromia region. Abiy is an Oromo himself and came to power from the Oromo Democratic Party (ODP) that he has been serving as the chairman in addition to his primary role as the Prime Minister of the ruling Prosperity Party. The parliament session was broadcast live on television.

Abiy's argument highlighted the default Oromo eligibility and entitlement for a high share in comparison with the other ethnic groups; his speech on these topics lasted from 3:33 to 3:40 hours of the session and were criticized as an inflammatory and politically charged factor that prompted violence— the June to July 2022 Amhara massacres by the OLA, with alleged collaboration with the regional state officials.

One of his speeches emphasized that, as one of the majority ethnic groups, the Oromo have not received the large shares they deserved in the political and economic space— in security, leadership, workforce, business, and other sectors, while adding that the Amhara are the group that dominates the majority of positions in these structures. The statement included that the Oromo farmers have not been earning a quarter of what they deserved, commenting that "this is not right." Abiy also presented accusations against residents of Addis Ababa for what he described as deep-rooted hate against the Oromo. He added that the school systems and communities in Addis Ababa have been accommodative of foreign languages such as French, Greek, Italian, German, Turkish, English, and others, while "hating and refusing" the Oromo language in the school and various systems— stressing that those who are hesitant for adopting the Oromo language while practicing alien systems may not be called Ethiopians. These statements of Abiy have been condemned for triggering further ethnic tension that is believed to revive the already fragile ethnic violence and intolerance in the Oromia and other regions where the Amhara are a minority and targeted. See State incitements, for prior reports on inflammatory speeches by others.

=== The Tole and Gimbi massacres ===
One of the 2022 deadliest massacres of the Amhara occurred on 18 June in the place named Tole and neighboring villages, in Gimbi Wollega of the Oromia region. The government blamed rebels, and witnesses accused the Oromo Liberation Army (OLA) as perpetrators but the OLA accused government forces. Witnesses from the area have stated that ethnic Amhara have been selected and "killed like chickens"— they counted over 230 bodies. They feared that the numbers could be higher since many Amhara have been abducted and could not be traced. Residents expressed serious concerns about the continuation of the attack if the Federal army leave the areas. Due to a lack of protection, the Amhara community requested assisted relocation to escape further attacks by the OLA.

Numerous international reports revealed that the scale of the targeted killings is larger in multiple Gimbi villages where the massacres occurred than what initial reports covered on June 18, 2022. More victims were identified, and the number of counted bodies increased with days, from 230 to over 500, possibly higher. Informal statements reported over 3000, however, an independent field investigation is needed for a complete list of the victims.

The OLA has been massacring the Amhara since the early 1990s. Due to conflict with the former TPLF regime, the Oromo rebels remained exiled until the Nobel Prize Awardee, Prime Minister Abiy Ahmed brought them back from Eritrea when he took power in 2018. These groups returned armed and were also accused of vandalizing over eighteen banks in the Oromia region with no clear punitive measures from the government. Large-scale killings of the Amhara have been carried out by the same group since then.

Motives of the perpetrators vary from location to location— ethnic origin, religious origin, or both. In the Gimbi massacres, the name list indicated that the majority of the victims were Muslim Amhara. Reports covered that those who hid in the mosque were surrounded and murdered. Most of the ethnic Amhara inhabitants in Gimbi were migrants from the Wollo Province who were resettled by the former communist government, the Derg regime, after drought and famine hit the province. Similarly, the Shashemene massacre in July 2020 demonstrated another religious motive. In this attack, Orthodox Christians predominantly from Amhara and others from different ethnic groups were also targeted. On the other hand, in The Ataye massacre and other locations, both Muslim and Orthodox Amhara were executed and mass-buried together, despite religious differences.

=== The Kellem massacre ===
On July 4, 2022, the Ethiopian Human Rights Commission (EHRC) made calls for an urgent reinforcement of government security forces following the massacres that occurred against the minority Amhara people in Kellem, which is one of the zones in Wollega, Oromia. The specific Amhara villages are also known as Mender 20 and Mender 21 in the Hawa Gelan Woreda. This violence occurred within two weeks from the June 2022 Gimbi massacre that claimed the lives of several hundred innocent Amhara. Both Kellem and Gimbi are close to each other and are around 400 kilometers away from the capital, Addis Ababa. EHRC never disclosed the number of the victims but reported that the Oromo Liberation Army (OLA) was the responsible attackers. One of the patterns that witnesses and reports highlighted was that communications are generally down in the areas where killings were carried out, indicating possible coordination rather than a coincidence.

=== Attacks in Efrata ena Gidim (Ataye area) ===
Reports show that since 2018, this became the fourth attack against the Amhara civilians in the Efrata ena Gidim Woreda in the Northern Shewa of the Amhara region that started on 10 July 2022 and continued for several days, in the Arso Amboa (Zembo), and Wayena kebeles near Ataye town. The violence claimed at least 17 civilian lives and many injured and hundreds displaced, along with a siege that led to property damages, including the burning of residential homes. Many of the victims were farmers, and witnesses described the return of the violence and initiations of the attacks in the hot spot conflict areas by the OLA, in the borderline between the Oromia Zone where ethnic Oromo live within the Amhara region, and the local Amhara farmers. IDPs and survivors in Debre Berhan, Shewa Robit, Mahale Meda, and other areas expressed fear for their security for returning to their homes. Many of them expressed that they lost their loved ones due to repeated attacks. Records show that there are unresolved frequent territorial and administrative disputes between the Oromia special zone and the Amhara region in which the Oromo exercised autonomy since its creation in 1995 by the former TPLF regime.

=== War in Amhara ===
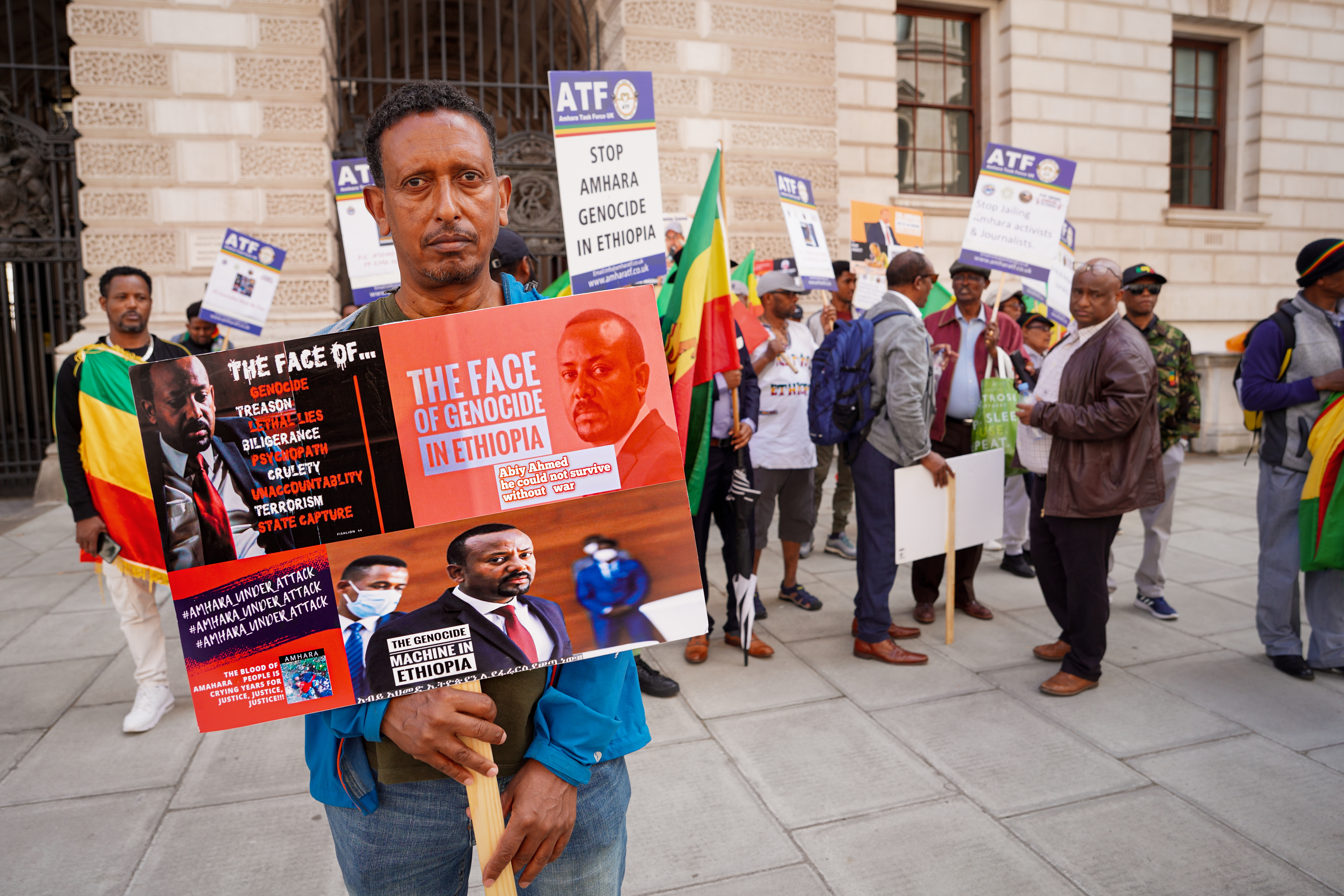
On Saturday 29 July 2023, Amhara activists marched across central London. Some of them with placards carrying the words "Amhara Genocide." In this photo they had stopped to demonstrate outside Britain's Foreign Office.

During the War in Amhara that started in 2023, drone strikes in late 2023 mostly killed civilians, according to media reports.

In February 2024, it was reported that Ethiopian troops killed 45 civilians in a massacre in Amhara state since late January.

In September 2024, the EHRC accused federal government forces of carrying out extrajudicial killings in Amhara, and mass arbitrary detentions in the region and elsewhere.

Since the beginning of the war the US based Institute Lemkin for Genocide Prevention issued a red flag alert, characterizing the mass abduction and detention of Amharas as potentially indicative of a looming genocide.

== Calls from various voices ==
Preventative measures and early warning efforts are expected to limit further ethnic-based destructions against targeted ethnic groups. The diasporas and others in the country made calls to the rights, humanitarian, accountability, and other influential groups to take action. Although the Amhara and Agew massacres have been going on for over thirty years, many expressed that the case has not received adequate campaign and media coverage. However, due to the scale and frequency of the attacks, progress has been observed in the number of reports. Despite political interest or country profile, such "marginalized" human rights cases require timely root cause assessment for the implementation of preventative measures, accountability mechanisms, and providing humanitarian needs.
