= Somali Student Association =

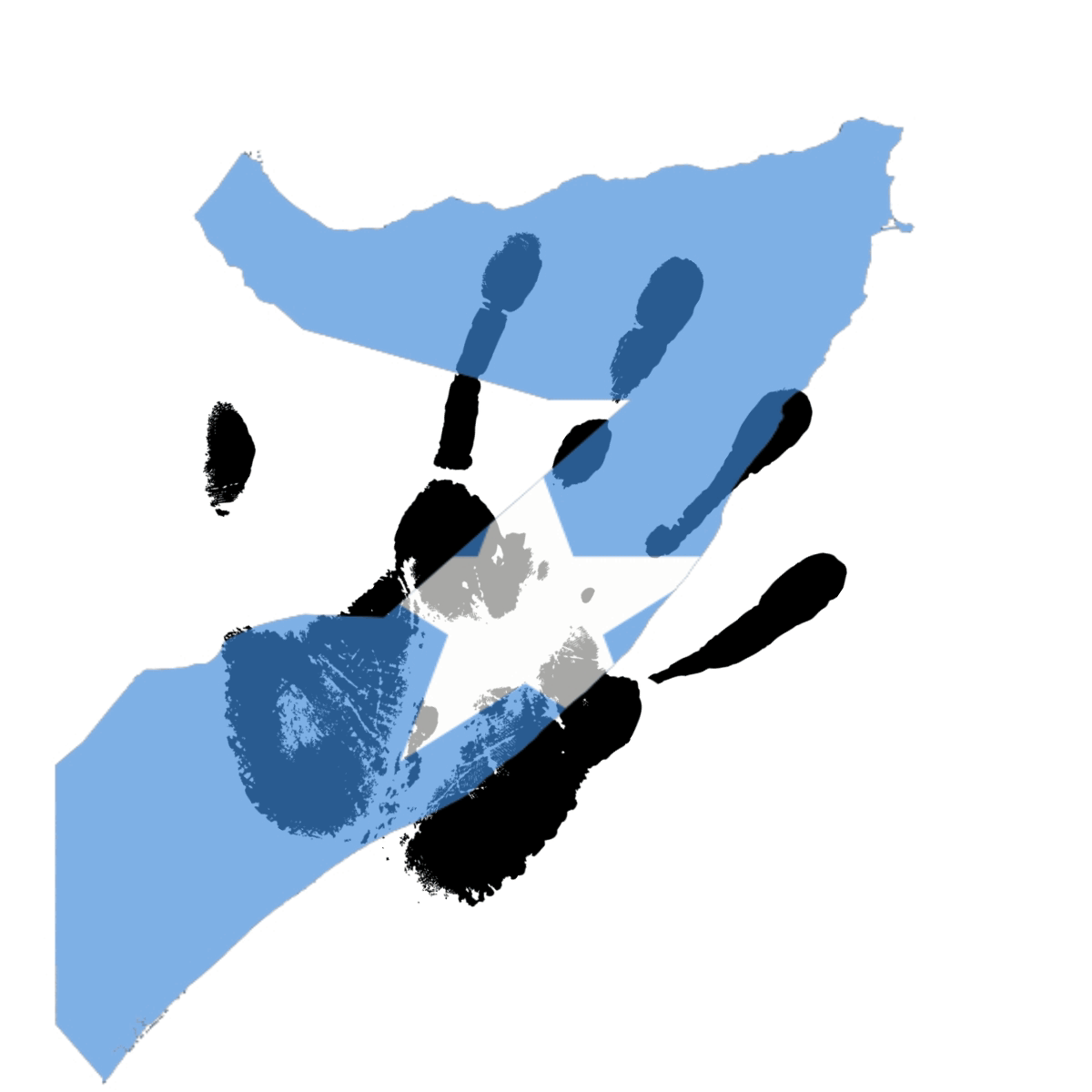
Somali Student Association logo (2010)

The Somali Student Association (SSA or SSAUMN) is a student organization at the University of Minnesota that aims to connect Somali students that attend the university in the Twin Cities.

It was formed in response to the growing number of Somali students at the University of Minnesota and has become most notable as the largest Somali Student Organization in the United States encompassing over 500 members. The SSA has programs where students from different backgrounds can come and learn from each other. Also, educational programs which are beneficial to any student from the Twin Cities. SSA is key in exhibiting the cultural heritage of Somalis at the University of Minnesota Twin Cities as well as the surrounding communities.

The organization's mission is to help new Somali students with different aspects of college life. Some of those aspects include helping Somali students learn more about financial aid, careers and work opportunities.

The organization's open-forums and annual meetings are designed to adhere to the voices of the greater Somali Community and the University of Minnesota.
