= Italo-Ethiopian War =

Italo-Ethiopian War, Italo-Abyssinian War or Italian invasion of Ethiopia / Abyssinia may refer to:

- Italo-Ethiopian War of 1887–1889 (also known as the Eritrean War)
- First Italo-Ethiopian War (1895–1896)
- Second Italo-Ethiopian War (1935–1937)

== See also ==
- Ethiopian war (disambiguation)
- Abyssinia Crisis, a 1935 crisis originating in the so-called Walwal incident in the then ongoing conflict between Italy and Ethiopia
- East African Campaign (World War II) of 1940–1941 defeated the Italians and restored the independence of Abyssinia, this time with direct assistance from other powers
