= Anti-Amhara sentiment =

Ethnic hatred against Amhara people in Ethiopia

Anti-Amhara sentiment is opposition, hatred, discrimination and bias against Amhara people in Ethiopia. Amharas are subjected to longstanding ethnic hatred among the Tigrayan and Oromo elites. The Persecution of the Amharas is typically stemmed from the accusation of Amharas for atrocities and land acquisition during the colonial rule in the Ethiopian Empire. Many Oromo activists and intellectuals pertained Amhara of being "Neftenya", a feudal lord and vassal who manages the lands loyal to the imperial government.

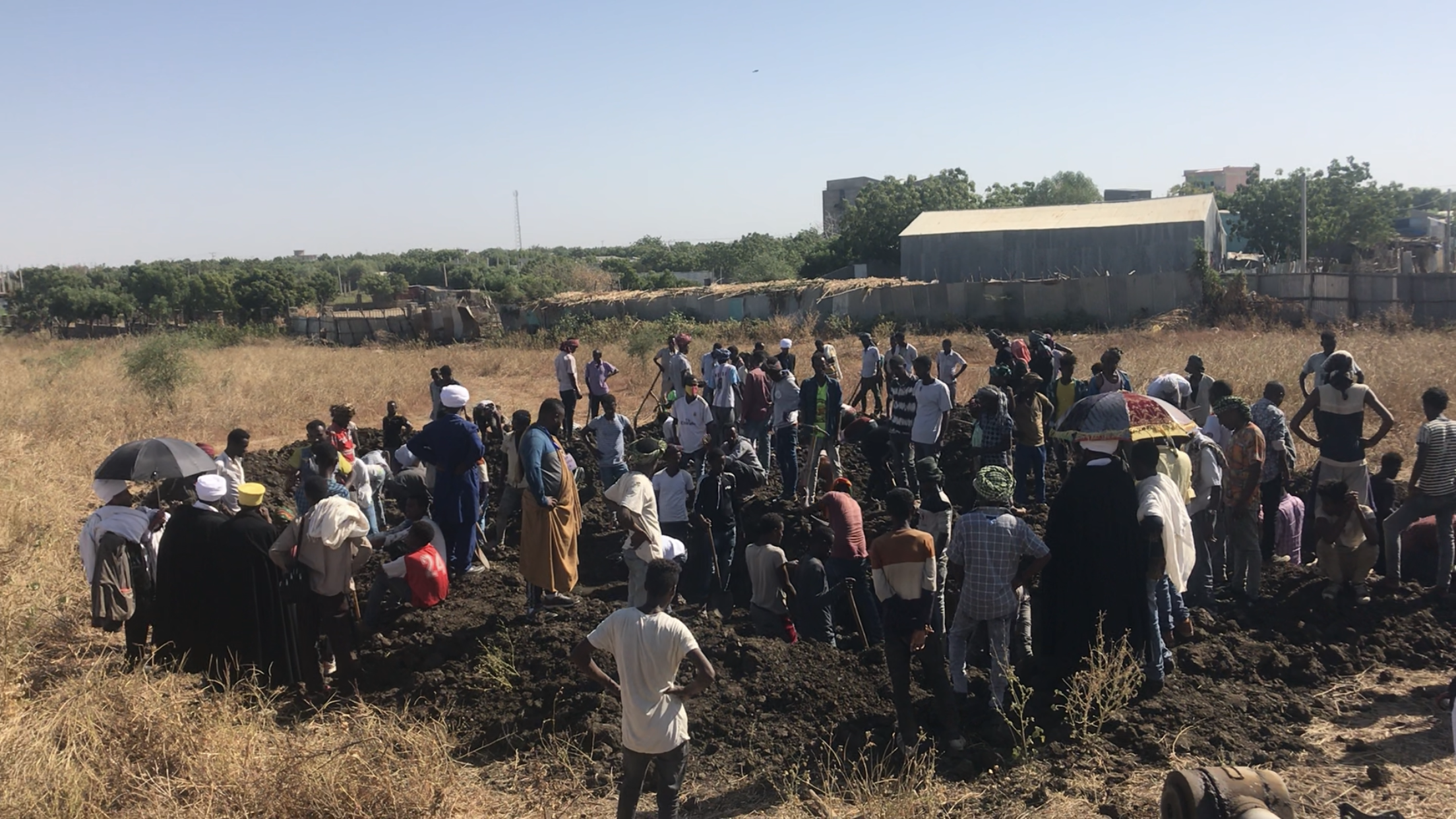
Funeral services at Abu Aregawi church for mass killings that occurred in Mai Kadra

Since 1990s, Amharas were systematically persecuted by the dominant ruling party EPRDF, which was led by majority ethnic Tigrayans. In Welkait, Amharas were internally displaced, deported and tortured as the Welkait population replaced by Tigrayans; they often punished for speaking Amharic language. During the onset of Tigray War, TPLF committed war crime against 600 civilians where mostly Amharas in Mai Kadra massacre. The massacre became widespread attention in mainstream media. Prime Minister Abiy Ahmed administration has been a source of accusation of massacring Amharas in Oromia Zone in Amhara Region and West Welega Zone.

== History ==
Anti-Amhara sentiment was existed throughout late 19th and 20th century during the Ethiopian Empire. Amharan hegemony is viewed by some beliefs that posit anti-egalitarian apart from African classical ideologues, and territorial expansions demonstrate "cultural imperialism" that imposed religion and customs on other ethnic identity. The spread of the Ethiopian Orthodox Church has been an influence of anti-Amhara persecutions. Many Oromo elites and revolutionaries see Amhara as a "colonizer" that subjugated and exploited Oromo people from their land. Arsi Oromos accepted Islam in large demonstration of anti-Amhara sentiment and rejected associated values and norms. Eritrean secessionist during the Eritrean War of Independence also expressed anti-Amhara sentiment. The relations between Amhara nationalist and Eritrea in the Tigray War is mutualistic cooperation in present-day; both Amharan regional armies and local militias, and Eritrean National Defense Forces involved an intervention in Tigray Region. During the Italian occupation of Ethiopia, the Italians used anti-Amhara rhetoric to undermine Ethiopia by portraying it as a "colonial state". Birhanu Bitew wrote that such views persists to current Ethiopian ethnic politics, promoting violence and damaging the Ethiopian state. It is also evident that the Somalis, who were waged resistance against Haile Selassie regime, demonstrated anti-Amhara sentiment, and more broadly, they expressed during the British rule.

The post-1991 EPRDF regime was led by ethnic Tigrayans and Amharas are systematically persecuted. The Tigrayan-ruled TPLF regime has been viewed as a reprisal of the Ethiopian Empire and Derg regimes, which were ruled majority by ethnic Amharas. During this period, Amharas are targeted to false accusation as a former oppressor in the imperial rule in veil of ethnic diversity. The recognition of Welkait to Amhara led fierce violence. In 2016, the Welkait Committee members arrested and tortured after petitioning the Welkait question to Amhara. Zafie Atalay, a testimony told in 2020 interview that "Now it is worse than before. You cannot speak Amharic at all, you cannot have Amharic songs on your phone or flash drive, you cannot display the national flag without the EPRDF symbol; you cannot wear the shirt of the Gondar football club Fasil Kenema. You risk your life simply being Amhara."

During Abiy Ahmed administration, most of Amharas resented to his party who attempted to disarm Fano militia in April 2023. Numerous massacres against Amhara civilians took place during Abiy's administration, notably in Oromia Zone in Amhara Region, Mai Kadra and West Welega Zone. The Mai Kadra massacre went mainstream phenomena where the Tigray Defense Forces committed war crime against 600 Amhara civilians.

== See also ==
- Amhara genocide
