= Asosa (woreda) =

District in Benishangul-Gumuz Region, Ethiopia

Coordinates: 10°10′N 34°25′E

Asosa is a woreda in Benishangul-Gumuz Region, Ethiopia. Part of the Asosa Zone, it is bordered by Kurmuk and Komesha in the north, by Menge in the northeast, by Oda Buldigilu in the east, by Bambasi in the southeast, by Mao-Komo special woreda in the south and by Sudan in the west. This Woreda is named after its largest settlement, Asosa. Rivers include the Yabus and its tributary the Buldidine. One of the highest points in Asosa is Mount Bange.

== Recent history ==
Construction of two health clinics in Asosa woreda was announced 9 March 2009, at a cost of almost 2 million Birr, which would over 40,000 people. These would join one hospital, and 27 health stations or health posts which were currently providing service to over 87,000 inhabitants. Woreda officials announced that UNICEF had donated medical equipment and refrigerators worth over 2.6 million Birr to equip these clinics.

In February 2009, the Ethiopian Roads Authority announced that they had awarded a 502.8 million Birr contract to upgrade and repair the 100-kilometer-long road linking Asosa to Kurmuk in Sudan. The work was done by Sino-Hydro International, a Chinese construction company. The project began in 2009 and took 36 months to complete. It is the last section of the highway which connects Addis Ababa, Nekemte, Asosa, and Kurmuk. The Arab Bank for Economic Development in Africa, the Saudi Fund for Development, and the Ethiopian government financed the project.

== Demographics ==
The 2007 national census reported a total population for this woreda of 104,147, of whom 52,968 were men and 51,179 were women; 24,214 or 23.25% of its population were urban dwellers. The majority of the inhabitants said they were Moslem, with 63.27% of the population reporting they observed this belief, while 31.18% of the population practised Ethiopian Orthodox Christianity, and 5.23% were Protestant.

Based on figures from the Central Statistical Agency in 2005, this woreda has an estimated total population of 102,732, of whom 53,340 are men and 49,392 are women; 20,226 or 19.69% of the population are urban dwellers. With an estimated area of 1,991.41 square kilometers, Asosa has a population density of 51.6 people per square kilometer which is greater than the Zone average of 19.95.

The 1994 national census reported a total population for this woreda of 73,954 in 17,162 households, of whom 38,442 were men and 35,512 were women; 11,749 or 15.89% of its population were urban dwellers. The three largest ethnic groups reported in Asosa were the Amhara (53%), the Berta (34%), and the Oromo (9.4%); all other ethnic groups made up 3.6% of the population. Amharic is spoken as a first language by 55%, 34% speak Berta, and 8.7% speak Oromiffa; the remaining 2.3% spoke all other primary languages reported. The majority of the inhabitants were Muslim, with 61.5% of the population stating they embraced that faith, while 35.8% practiced Ethiopian Orthodox Christianity, and 2.4% were Protestant. Concerning education, 35.33% of the population were considered literate, which is more than the Zone average of 18.49%; 20.72% of children aged 7–12 were in primary school; 3.41% of the children aged 13–14 were in junior secondary school; and 5.6% of the inhabitants aged 15–18 were in senior secondary school. Concerning sanitary conditions, 63.8% of the urban houses and 50.7% of all houses had access to safe drinking water at the time of the census; 86.7% of the urban and 9.8% of all houses had toilet facilities.
