= Oda Buldigilu (woreda) =

Coordinates: 10°10′N 35°10′E

Oda Buldigilu is one of the 20 Districts of Ethiopia, or woredas, in the Benishangul-Gumuz Region of Ethiopia. Part of the Asosa Zone, it is bordered by the Kamashi Zone in the north and east, by Oromia Region in the south, by Bambasi in the southwest, by Asosa in the west, and by Menge in the northwest. The major settlement in this woreda is Oda Buldigilu.

This woreda is located on the eastern slopes of the Dabus River, with elevations ranging from approximately 2,000 meters above sea level in the east to just under 1000 meters at the bottom of the Dabus valley.

== Demographics ==
The 2007 national census reported a total population for this woreda of 54,584, of whom 28,885 were men and 25,699 were women; 3,165 or 5.8% of its population were urban dwellers. The majority of the inhabitants said they were Moslem, with 67.53% of the population reporting they observed this belief, while 27.37% of the population were Protestant and 4.14% practised Ethiopian Orthodox Christianity.

Based on figures from the Central Statistical Agency in 2005, this woreda has an estimated total population of 29,604, of whom 15,282 are men and 14,322 are women. With an estimated area of 1,387.19 square kilometers, Oda Godere has a population density of 21.3 people per square kilometer which is greater than the Zone average of 19.95.

The 1994 national census reported a total population for this woreda of 22,320 in 4,743 households, of whom 11,573 were men and 10,747 were women; no urban dwellers were recorded in this woreda. The three largest ethnic groups reported in Oda Godere were the Berta (77.7%), the Oromo (18.6%), and the Gumuz (3.4%); all other ethnic groups made up 0.3% of the population. Berta is spoken as a first language by 77.4%, 20% speak Oromiffa, and 2.4% speak Gumuz; the remaining 0.2% spoke all other primary languages reported. The majority of the inhabitants were Muslim, with 70% of the population stating that they embraced that faith, while 14.8% were Protestants, and 11.5% professed Ethiopian Orthodox Christianity. Concerning education, 2.73% of the population were considered literate, which is less than the Zone average of 18.49%; only 0.55% of children aged 7–12 were in primary school, while none of the children aged 13–14 were in junior secondary school, nor were any of the inhabitants aged 15–18 in senior secondary school. Concerning sanitary conditions, 3.7% of all houses had access to safe drinking water, and 2.7% had toilet facilities at the time of the census.
