= Belo Jegonfoy =

District in Benishangul-Gumuz, Ethiopia

Coordinates: 9°20′N 36°10′E

Bolo Jiganfo is one of the 20 Districts of Ethiopia, or woredas, in the Benishangul-Gumuz region of Ethiopia. Part of the Kamashi Zone, it is bordered on the west by the Didessa River, which separates it from Kamashi, on the north by the Hanger River which separates it from Yaso, and by Oromia region in the east and south; parts of the woreda are enclaves in the Oromia region.

== Demographics ==
The 2007 national census reported a total population for this woreda of 30,143, of whom 15,983 were men and 14,160 were women; 2,762 or 9.16% of its population were urban dwellers. The majority of the inhabitants said they practiced Ethiopian Orthodox Christianity, with 46.39% of the population reporting they observed this belief, while 44.55% of the population were Protestant, 4.57% were Muslim, 2.15% practiced traditional beliefs, and 1.55% were Catholic.

Based on figures from the Central Statistical Agency in 2005, this woreda has an estimated total population of 14,943, of whom 7,624 are men and 7,319 are women. With an estimated area of 1,611.88 square kilometers, Belo Jegonfoy has an estimated population density of 9.3 people per square kilometer which is greater than the Zone average of 7.61. Information is lacking on the towns of this woreda.

The 1994 national census reported a total population for this woreda of 11,266 in 2,391 households, of whom 5,774 were men and 5,492 were women; no urban inhabitants were recorded. The three largest ethnic groups reported in Bolo Jiganfo were the Gumuz (69.4%), the Berta (19.8%), and the Oromo (10%); all other ethnic groups made up 0.8% of the population. Gumuz is spoken as a first language by 69.6%, Berta by 19.8%, and Oromiffa by 9.8%; the remaining 0.8% spoke all other primary languages reported. Concerning religion, the largest group of the inhabitants practiced Ethiopian Orthodox Christianity, with 46.4% of the population reporting they professed that religion, while 24% were Protestant, and 21.4% observed traditional religions. Concerning education, 8.05% of the population were considered literate, which is less than the Zone average of 11.36%; 8.83% of children aged 7–12 were in primary school, a negligible number of the children aged 13–14 were in junior secondary school, and none of the inhabitants aged 15–18 in senior secondary school. Concerning sanitary conditions, 1.9% of all houses had access to safe drinking water, and 2% had toilet facilities at the time of the census.
