= Yaso =

Region of Ethiopia

Coordinates: 10°00′N 36°00′E

Yaso is one of the 20 Districts of Ethiopia, or woredas, in the Benishangul-Gumuz region of Ethiopia. Part of the Kamashi Zone, Yaso is bordered by the Abay River on the north which separates it from the Metekel Zone and the Amhara Region, by the Oromia Region in the southeast, by the Hanger River on the south which separates it from Belo Jegonfoy, and by the Didessa River on the west which separates it from Kamashi and Agalo Mite.

On 24 July 2009, the Ethiopian Roads Authority announced that they had completed a gravel road 72 kilometers in length between Kamashi and Yaso woredas at a cost of 149 Birr.

== Demographics ==
The 2007 national census reported a total population for this woreda of 12,747, of whom 6,463 were men and 6,284 were women; 1,417 or 11.12% of its population were urban dwellers. A plurality of the inhabitants said they were Protestant, with 44.72% of the population reporting they observed this belief, while 31.34% of the population practiced Ethiopian Orthodox Christianity, and 21.97% practiced traditional beliefs.

Based on figures from the Central Statistical Agency in 2005, this woreda has an estimated total population of 10,308, of whom 5,155 are men and 5,153 are women. With an estimated area of 2,789.07 square kilometers, Yaso has a population density of 3.7 people per square kilometer which is less than the Zone average of 7.61. Information is lacking on the towns of this woreda.

The 1994 national census reported a total population for this woreda of 7,771 in 1,655 households, of whom 3,904 were men and 3,867 were females; no urban inhabitants were reported. The two largest ethnic groups reported in Yaso were the Gumuz (86.2%), and the Oromo (13.6%); all other ethnic groups made up 0.2% of the population. Gumuz is spoken as a first language by 86.5%, and Oromiffa by 13.3%; the remaining 0.2% spoke all other primary languages reported. The largest group of inhabitants followed traditional religions, with 48.3% of the population reporting beliefs reported under that category, while 29.3% embraced Ethiopian Orthodox Christianity. Concerning education, 11.03% of the population were considered literate, which is about the same as the Zone average of 11.36%; 13.22% of children aged 7–12 were in primary school, a negligible number of the children aged 13–14 were in junior secondary school, and 0.61% of the inhabitants aged 15–18 were in senior secondary school. Concerning sanitary conditions, 6.6% of all houses had access to safe drinking water, and 2.7% had toilet facilities at the time of the census.
