= Bambasi (woreda) =

District in Benishangul-Gumuz Region, Ethiopia

Coordinates: 9°45′N 34°30′E

Bambasi (also spelled Bambeshi) is a woreda in the Benishangul-Gumuz Region of Ethiopia. Part of the Asosa Zone, it is bordered by the Mao-Komo special woreda on the southwest, Asosa in the northwest, Oda Buldigilu in the northeast, and by the Oromia Region in the southeast.

This woreda and its only town, Bambasi, are named for the tallest point in this zone, Mount Bambasi. Rivers include the Dabus, which originates in this woreda.

== Demographics ==
The 2007 national census reported a total population for this woreda of 48,694, of whom 30,720 were men and 23,974 were women; 9,146 or 18.78% of its population were urban dwellers. The majority of the inhabitants said they were Moslem, with 48.08% of the population reporting they observed this belief, while 44.26% of the population practised Ethiopian Orthodox Christianity, and 3.83% were Protestant. The 1994 national census reported a total population for this woreda of 34,475 in 8,117 households, of whom 17,419 were men and 17,056 were women; 4,164 or 12.08% of its population were urban dwellers. The five largest ethnic groups reported in Bambasi were the Amhara (52%), the Berta (33.8%), the Oromo (12.4%), 12.3% Komo, the Tigray (4.7%), and the Mao (3.7%). Amharic is spoken as a first language by 72.7% of the population; 28.7% speak Berta, 7.4% Komo, 32.2% Oromiffa, 2.6% Tigrinya, and 3.7% speak Mao, one of the northern group of Omotic languages. The majority of the inhabitants were Muslim, with 72.3% of the population reporting they belonged to that faith, while 26.3% observed Ethiopian Orthodox Christianity. Based on figures from the Central Statistical Agency in 2005, this woreda has an estimated total population of 47,374, of whom 23,863 are men and 23,511 are women; 7,166 or 15.1% of the population are urban dwellers. With an estimated area of 2,210.16 square kilometers, Bambasi has a population density of 21.4 people per square kilometer which is greater than the Zone average of 19.95. keshmando(Gojjam sefer) is one oldest and historical place in this woreda.

Concerning education, 17.1% of the population were considered illiterate, which is less than the Zone average of 18.49%; 8.68% of children aged 7–12 were in primary school; 1.06% of the children aged 13–14 were in junior secondary school; and 0.14% of the inhabitants aged 15–18 were in senior secondary school. Concerning sanitary conditions, 56.8% of the urban houses and 26% of all houses had access to safe drinking water at the time of the census; 72.7% of the urban and 34.9% of the total had toilet facilities.
