= Benishangul Sheikhdoms =

19th century Muslim states in western Ethiopia

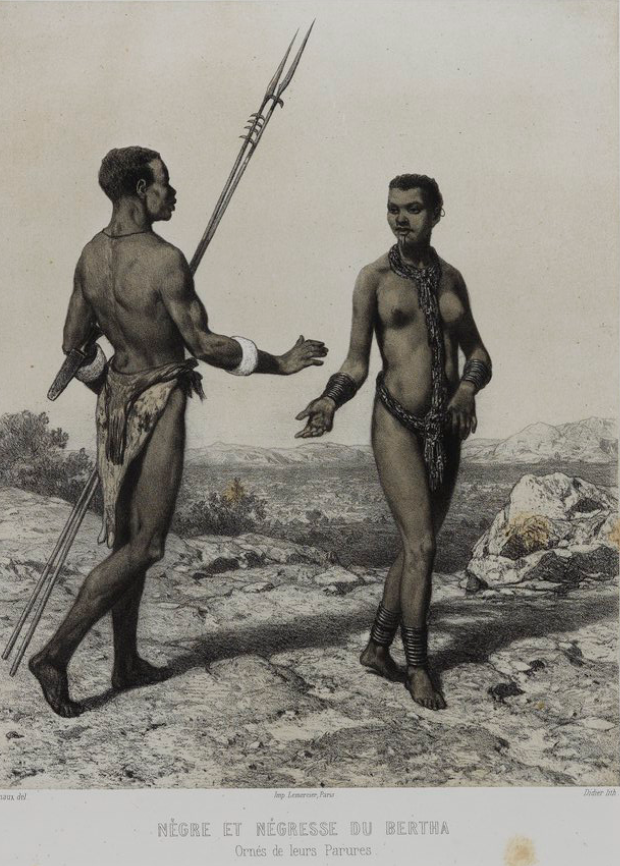
Two Berta (Shangul) in the mid-19th century

The Benishangul Sheikhdoms were Muslim states that formed across western Ethiopia (particularly Benishangul-Gumuz region) and southeastern Sudan during the 19th century in the land formerly ruled by the Kingdom of Fazughli and Funj Sultanate, the most powerful of which was ruled by one "Sheikh Khoyele." The northernmost holdings of these kingdoms would instead become the Ethiopian province of Ras al-Fil to the west of Begemder and be settled by Fulani and Darfur migrants, known as Takrur, with the consent of the Gondarine period emperors. The Benishangul and adjacent sheikhdoms arose due to Sennar's fall and population movements caused by the ensuing turmoil. Later on in the century these polities would be conquered by the Ethiopian Empire during its southern expansion, after which the former capital of Asosa became the area's political and economic capital. Gubba is recorded to have been conquered at the behest of Abdallahi ibn Muhammad of Sudan who feared the British would occupy it. The leader of Benishangul in the early 20th century was Khojali al-Hassan.

== Religion ==
The Arabs as well as the Funj established their presence in the territory of the Berta people, encouraging Islam in Benishangul. A prominent Nigerian Islamic missionary Fakih Ahmed is distinguished for promoting the Tijaniyyah order. The local population predominantly adhered to the Shafi'i school.

== List of states ==
- Sultanate of Asosa
- Sheikhdom of Bambasi
- Sheikhdom of Beni Shangul
- Sheikhdom of Fadasi (named as a region in the Kingdom of Fazughli)
- Sheikhdom of Gizen (now a town)
- Sultanate of Gubba (Arabic: Qubba)
- Sheikhdom of Komosha (Khomosha)

== See also ==
- History of Ethiopia
