= Sherkole =

Coordinates: 10°40′N 34°50′E

Sherkole is one of the 20 Districts of Ethiopia, or woredas, in the Benishangul-Gumuz Region of Ethiopia. Part of the Asosa Zone, it is bordered by Menge on the south, Kurmuk on the west, by Sudan on the north, and Kamashi Zone on the east.

The major settlement in this woreda is Holma. Ad-Damazin transit center, housing 14,431 displaced Sudanese, is also located in Sherkole. One of the highest points in Sherkole is Mount Abu Ranab, a lone peak that rises near the Abay River. Other rivers include the Tumat, a tributary of the Abay.

== Demographics ==
The 2007 national census reported a total population for this woreda of 24,679, of whom 12,288 were men and 12,391 were women; 903 or 3.66% of its population were urban dwellers. The majority of the inhabitants said they were Moslem, with 98.15% of the population reporting they observed this belief, while 1.49% of the population practised Ethiopian Orthodox Christianity.

Based on figures from the Central Statistical Agency in 2005, this woreda has an estimated total population of 18,558, of whom 9,066 are men and 9,492 are women. With an estimated area of 3,204.22 square kilometers, Sherkole has a population density of 5.8 people per square kilometer which is less than the Zone average of 19.95.

The 1994 national census reported a total population for this woreda of 13,989 in 3,231 households, of whom 6,866 were men and 7,123 were women; no urban dwellers were reported. The two largest ethnic groups reported in Sherkole were the Berta (92.4%), and the Gumuz (2.4%); all other ethnic groups made up 5.2% of the population. Berta is spoken as a first language by 93%, and 2.5% speak Gumuz; the remaining 4.5% spoke all other primary languages reported. The majority of the inhabitants were Muslim, with 99.6% of the population reporting they professed that religion. Concerning education, 6.94% of the population were considered literate, which is less than the Zone average of 18.49%; only 5.37% of children aged 7–12 were in primary school, while a negligible number of the children aged 13–14 were in junior secondary school, and none of the inhabitants aged 15–18 were in senior secondary school. Concerning sanitary conditions, 1.8% of all houses had access to safe drinking water, and 2.4% had toilet facilities at the time of the census.
