= Kamashi (woreda) =

District of Ethiopia

Coordinates: 9°30′N 35°45′E

Kamashi is one of the 20 Districts of Ethiopia, or woredas, in the Benishangul-Gumuz Region of Ethiopia. Part of the Kamashi Zone, it is bordered by the Didessa River on the east which separates it from Yaso and Belo Jegonfoy, by the Oromia Region on the south and west, and by Agalo Mite on the northwest.

This woreda is located on the western slopes of the Didessa River, with elevations ranging from approximately 2000 meters above sea level in the west to just under 1000 meters at the bottom of the Didessa valley. Notable high points in Kamashi include Mount Dade.

The administrative center of this woreda is named Kamashi; population details of this town are not available. Local tradition reports that the first mosque in what is now Benishangul-Gumuz was founded in Kamashi during the early 19th century by a Bidari trader, 'Ummad wad al-Hajj. Ethiopia Call Ministry, an NGO, has announced that they will begin construction of a modern hospital in Kamashi, starting January 2007. Budgeted at 35 million Birr, construction of the hospital is expected to take three years. On 24 July 2009, the Ethiopian Roads Authority announced that it had completed a gravel road 72 kilometers in length between Kamashi and Yaso woredas at a cost of 149 Birr.

== Demographics ==
The 2007 national census reported a total population for this woreda of 17,883, of whom 9,170 were men and 8,713 were women; 5,917 or 33.09% of its population were urban dwellers. The majority of the inhabitants said they were Protestant, with 66% of the population reporting they observed this belief, while 29.7% of the population practiced Ethiopian Orthodox Christianity, and 2.64% practiced traditional beliefs.

Based on figures from the Central Statistical Agency in 2005, this woreda has an estimated total population of 11,055, of whom 5,679 are men and 5,376 are women. With an estimated area of 1,622.50 square kilometers, Kamashi has a population density of 6.8 people per square kilometer which is less than the Zone average of 7.61.

The 1994 national census reported a total population for this woreda of 8,335 in 1,611 households, of whom 4,301 were men and 4,034 were women. The two largest ethnic groups reported in Kamashi woreda were the Gumuz (81.4%), and the Oromo (17.4%); all other ethnic groups made up 1.2% of the population. Gumuz is spoken as a first language by 81%, and Oromiffa by 17.8%; the remaining 1.2% spoke all other primary languages reported. The largest group of the inhabitants practiced traditional religions, with 43.6% of the population reporting beliefs reported under that category, while 29.5% are Protestant, and 19.3% were Ethiopian Orthodox Christianity. Concerning education, 17.83% of the population were considered literate, which is more than the Zone average of 11.36%; 9.24% of children aged 7–12 were in primary school, while a negligible number of the children aged 13–14 were in junior secondary school and the inhabitants aged 15–18 were in senior secondary school. Concerning sanitary conditions, 0.9% of all houses had access to safe drinking water, and 2.2% had toilet facilities at the time of the census.
