= Agalo Mite =

District of Ethiopia

Coordinates: 9°45′N 35°30′E

Agalo Mite is one of the 20 Districts of Ethiopia, or woredas, in the Benishangul-Gumuz Region of Ethiopia. Part of the Kamashi Zone, it is bordered by Kamashi woreda on the southeast, the Oromia Region on the southwest, Sirba Abbay on the northwest, the Abay River on the north (which separates it from the Metekel Zone), and by the Didessa River on the northeast (which separates it from Yaso).

This woreda is located on the southern slopes of the Didessa and Abay Rivers, with elevations ranging from approximately 2500 meters above sea level in the southwest to just under 1000 meters at the bottom of the Abay valley.

== Demographics ==
The 2007 national census reported a total population for this woreda of 22,774, of whom 11,476 were men and 11,298 were women; 2,073 or 9.1% of its population were urban dwellers. The majority of the inhabitants said they were Protestant, with 76.54% of the population reporting they observed this belief, while 14.98% of the population practiced Ethiopian Orthodox Christianity, 5.42% practiced traditional beliefs, and 2.44% were Catholic.

Based on figures from the Central Statistical Agency in 2005, this woreda has an estimated total population of 18,824, of whom 9,350 are men and 9,474 are women. With an estimated area of 1,519.07 square kilometers, Agalo Mite has an estimated population density of 12.4 people per square kilometer which is greater than the Zone average of 7.61. Information is lacking on the towns of this woreda.

The 1994 national census reported a total population for this woreda of 14,190 in 2,489 households, of whom 7,081 were males and 7,109 were females; no urban inhabitants were reported. The two largest ethnic groups reported in Agalo Mite were the Gumuz (77.6%), and the Oromo (22%); all other ethnic groups made up 0.3% of the population. Gumuz is spoken as a first language by 78%, and Oromifa by 22%; the remaining 0.2% spoke all other primary languages reported. The majority of the inhabitants followed traditional beliefs, with 53.6% of the population reporting beliefs reported under that category, while 30.8% were Protestant, and 13% observed Ethiopian Orthodox Christianity. Concerning education, 12.28% of the population were considered literate, which is more than the Zone average of 11.36%; 7.82% of children aged 7–12 were in primary school, a negligible number of the children aged 13–14 were in junior secondary school, and none of the inhabitants aged 15–18 in senior secondary school. Concerning sanitary conditions, 7.2% of all houses had access to safe drinking water, and 3.7% had toilet facilities at the time of the census.
