= Menge (woreda) =

Coordinates: 10°20′N 34°50′E

Menge is one of the 20 Districts of Ethiopia, or woredas, in the Benishangul-Gumuz Region of Ethiopia. Part of the Asosa Zone, it is bordered by Asosa in the southwest, by Komesha in the west, by Sherkole in the north, by Kamashi Zone in the northeast, and by the Dabus River on the east which separates it from Oda Buldigilu. This woreda is named after its only town, Menge.

== Demographics ==
The 2007 national census reported a total population for this woreda of 40,240, of whom 20,248 were men and 19,992 were women; 1,101 or 2.74% of its population were urban dwellers. The majority of the inhabitants said they were Moslem, with 98.74% of the population reporting they observed this belief.

Based on figures from the Central Statistical Agency in 2005, this woreda has an estimated total population of 38,503, of whom 19,115 are men and 19,388 are women; 318 or 0.83% of the population are urban dwellers. With an estimated area of 1,500.63 square kilometers, Menge has a population density of 25.7 people per square kilometer which is greater than the Zone average of 19.95.

The 1994 national census reported a total population for this woreda of 28,970 in 6,868 households, of whom 14,445 were men and 14,525 were women; 185 or 0.64% of its population were urban dwellers. The largest ethnic group reported in Menge was the Berta with 99.6% of the population; a similar share speak Berta (99.6%), and 99.7% of the population said they were Muslim. Concerning education, 4.91% of the population were considered literate, which is less than the Zone average of 18.49%; 3.1% of children aged 7–12 were in primary school; a negligible number of the children aged 13–14 were in junior secondary school, and the same was true of the inhabitants aged 15–18 in senior secondary school. Concerning sanitary conditions, 92.3% of the urban houses and 2.3% of all houses had access to safe drinking water at the time of the census; 7.7% of the urban and 4.6% of all houses had toilet facilities.
