= Komesha =

Komesha is one of the 20 Districts of Ethiopia, or woredas, in the Benishangul-Gumuz Region of Ethiopia. Part of the Asosa Zone, it is bordered by the Asosa on the south, Kurmuk on the northwest and Menge on the east. The largest settlement in this woreda is Komesha. Sherkole refugee camp housing 9,526 displaced people from Sudan and South Sudan, is also located in Komesha.

== Demographics ==
The 2007 national census reported a total population for this woreda of 21,744, of whom 11,219 were men and 10,525 were women; 875 or 4.02% of its population were urban dwellers. The majority of the inhabitants said they were Moslem, with 69.28% of the population reporting they observed this belief, while 19.03% of the population were Protestant, 7.03% were Catholic, and 4.39% practised Ethiopian Orthodox Christianity.

Based on figures from the CSA in 2005, this woreda has an estimated total population of 12,948, of whom 6,613 are men and 6,335 are women. With an estimated area of 645.78 square kilometers, Komesha has a population density of 20.1 people per square kilometer which is greater than the Zone average of 19.95.

The 1994 national census reported a total population for this woreda of 9,762 in 2,261 households, of whom 5,008 were men and 4,754 were women; no urban dwellers were recorded. The largest ethnic group reported in Komesha was the Berta with 99.5% of the population; an equal share spoke Berta (99.5%), and 99.5% of the population said they were Muslim. Concerning education, 15.97% of the population were considered literate, which is less than the Zone average of 18.49%; 14.29% of children aged 7–12 were in primary school; 1.01% of the children aged 13–14 were in junior secondary school; and a negligible number of the inhabitants aged 15–18 were in senior secondary school. Concerning sanitary conditions, 2.8% of all houses had access to safe drinking water, and 16.8% had toilet facilities at the time of the census.
