= Menge =

Menge may refer to:

- Menge (woreda), a municipality in western Ethiopia
- Menge, Ethiopia, a town in western Ethiopia
- Menge House Complex, a historic home located at Dolgeville in Herkimer County, New York, US
- Saint-Menge, a commune in the Vosges department in Lorraine in northeastern France
- 3740 Menge, a Main-belt Asteroid discovered in 1981

People

- Franz Anton Menge (1808–1880), German entomologist
- Johann Menge (1788–1852), Australian geologist
- Susanne Menge (born 1960), German politician
- Wolfgang Menge (1924-2012), German journalist and television director

== See also ==
- Menges (disambiguation)
