= Kurmuk (woreda) =

District within the Benishanugul-Gumua region of western Ethiopia bordering Sudan

Coordinates: 10°30′N 34°20′E

Kurmuk is one of the 20 Districts of Ethiopia, or woredas, in the Benishangul-Gumuz Region of Ethiopia. Part of the Assosa Zone, it is bordered by Sudan in the north and west, Sherkole in the east, Khomesha in the southeast, and currently Abramo and Oura in the south.

This woreda is named after its only town, Kurmuk, Ethiopia. High points include Mounts Gule and Umbi.

== Demographics ==
The 2007 national census reported a total population for this woreda of 16,734, of whom 8,604 were men and 8,130 were women; 553 or 3.31% of its population were urban dwellers. The majority of the inhabitants said they were Moslem, with 95.77% of the population reporting they observed this belief, while 3.91% of the population practised Ethiopian Orthodox Christianity.

Based on figures from the Central Statistical Agency in 2005, this woreda has an estimated total population of 14,206, of whom 7,154 are men and 7,052 are women; 554 or 3.90% of the population are urban dwellers. With an estimated area of 1,434.07 square kilometers, Kurmuk has a population density of 9.9 people per square kilometer which is less than the Zone average of 19.95.

The 1994 national census reported a total population for this woreda of 10,614 in 2,290 households, of whom 5,365 were men and 5,249 were women; 322 or 3.03% of its population were urban dwellers. The largest ethnic group reported in Kurmuk was the Berta with 94.4% of the population; a similar share speak Berta (98.3%), and 98.3% of the population said they were Muslim. Concerning education, 14.39% of the population were considered literate, which is less than the Zone average of 18.49%; 13.74% of children aged 7–12 were in primary school; 4.56% of the children aged 13–14 were in junior secondary school; and a negligible number of the inhabitants aged 15–18 were in senior secondary school. Concerning sanitary conditions, 4.8% of the urban houses and 5.4% of all houses had access to safe drinking water at the time of the census; 39.2% of the urban and 8.4% of all houses had toilet facilities.
