= Mao-Komo special woreda =

District in Benishangul-Gumuz Region, Ethiopia

Coordinates: 9°30′N 34°20′E

Mao-Komo is a woreda in Benishangul-Gumuz Region, Ethiopia. Because it is not part of any zones in Benishangul-Gumuz, it is considered a Special woreda, an administrative subdivision which is similar to an autonomous area. The southernmost woreda in the Region, Mao-Komo is bordered on the west by Sudan and South Sudan, on the north by the Asosa Zone, and on the east and south by the Oromia Region. Towns in this woreda include Tongo, which has a weekly market. The Tongo refugee camp, housing 12,483 displaced people from Sudan and South Sudan, is also located in Mao-Komo.

The region and its inhabitants were described by the Dutch explorer Juan Maria Schuver, who travelled to the area in 1880-1883.

== Demographics ==
Based on the 2007 Census conducted by the Central Statistical Agency of Ethiopia (CSA), this woreda has a total population of 50,061, of whom 25,055 are men and 25,006 women. 3,392 or 6.78% of population are urban inhabitants. A total of 9,844 households were counted in this woreda, which results in an average of 5.08 persons to a household, and 9,503 housing units. The five largest ethnic groups reported in the Mao-Komo special woreda were the Oromo (35.1%), the Mao people (26.42%), the Berta (18.8%), the Kwama or Komo (14.46%), and the Fadashi (4.12%); all other ethnic groups made up 1.1% of the population. Main languages are Oromo (47.51%), Berta (17.47%), Mao (15.61%), Kwama (13.7%), and Fadashi (4.91%). The majority of the inhabitants were Muslim, with 94.56% of the population reporting that they held that belief, while 2.64% were Protestant, and 2.13% practiced Ethiopian Orthodox Christianity.

Based on figures from the Central Statistical Agency (CSA) in 2005, this woreda has an estimated total population of 18,668, of whom 9,110 are men and 9,558 are women. With an estimated area of 1,792.66 square kilometers, Mao-Komo has a population density of 10.4 people per square kilometer which is less than the Zone average of 19.95.

The 1994 national census reported a total population for this woreda of 14,071 in 3,086 households, of whom 6,899 were men and 7,172 were women; no urban dwellers were recorded. The six largest ethnic groups reported in Mao-Komo were the Oromo (52%), the Fadashi (21.4%), the Berta (12%), the Mao people (8%), the Kwama or Komo (5%) and the Gumuz (0.7%); all other ethnic groups made up 0.9% of the population. Oromiffa is spoken as a first language by 58%, 29% speak Fadashi, 6% speak Mao one of the northern group of Omotic languages, 5% Kwama, 1% Berta, and 0.7% speak Gumuz; the remaining 0.3% spoke all other primary languages reported. The majority of the inhabitants were Muslim, with 95.6% of the population reporting the followed that religion, while 4% observed Ethiopian Orthodox Christianity. The Oromo, who arrived to the area in the 18th and 19th century, tend to live in the highlands, whereas the Nilo-Saharan communities (Kwama, Gwama, Mao, Ganza) usually occupy the lowland savannas.

Concerning education, 0.89% of the population were considered literate; a negligible number of children aged 7-12 were in primary school as well as children aged 13-14 in junior secondary school, while none of the inhabitants aged 15-18 were in senior secondary school. Concerning sanitary conditions, 6.6% of all houses had access to safe drinking water, and 2.7% had toilet facilities at the time of the 1994 census.
