= Kurmuk, Ethiopia =

Kurmuk
- Town
- Location within Ethiopia
- Coordinates: 10°33′25″N 34°17′44″E
- Country: Ethiopia
- Region: Benishangul-Gumuz
- Zone: Asosa Zone
- Elevation: 653 m (2,142 ft)

Population (2005)
  - Total: 554
- Time zone: UTC+3 (EAT)

Kurmuk (also known as Kormuk) is a town in western Ethiopia. Located in the Asosa Zone of the Benishangul-Gumuz Region, Kurmuk has an elevation of 653 meters above sea level.

In 1962, Kurmuk was connected to Asosa by a dry-weather road, "rough but passable by trucks" according to the Highway Authority. However, by 1996 travel by this road was "discouraged for safety reasons."

Based on figures from the Central Statistical Agency, in 2005 this town has an estimated total population of 554, of whom 297 were males and 257 were females. According to the 1994 national census, its total population was 322, of whom 172 were males and 150 were females. It is the largest settlement in Kurmuk woreda.

The Italian colonial battalion stationed at Kurmuk attacked its twin in Sudan, Kurmuk, 7 July 1940, which was held by Bimbashi Mervyn Bell, with three British auxiliaries and 51 police. Bell eventually withdrew his men in good order, allowing the Italians to capture Kurmuk. Kurmuk was taken from the Italians by the British several months later on 14 February 1941. At the end of 1985, the Sudan Peoples Liberation Army (SPLA) set up bases in the hills across the Ethiopian border, south of Kurmuk . The Ethiopian National Defense Force provided the SPLA with support when they launched a cross-border raid into Sudan in 1997.
