= Sirba Abbay =

Coordinates: 10°15′N 35°10′E

Sirba Abbay is one of the 20 Districts of Ethiopia, or woredas, in the Benishangul-Gumuz Region of Ethiopia. Part of the Kamashi Zone, Sirba Abbay is bordered by the Oromia Region on the southwest, by Asosa Zone and Sudan on the west, by the Abay River on the north and east which separates it from the Metekel Zone, and by Agalo Mite on the southeast.

The book Mystery of the Nile narrates how one of the authors, Pasquale Scaturro, had been detained at the administrative center of Sirba Abay by the woreda administrator, Faisa Ayana, while travelling down the Abay in 2004. Near the administrative center there was a missionary station run by a Norwegian church.

This woreda is located on the southern slopes of the Abay River, with elevations ranging from approximately 2500 meters above sea level in the south to just under 1000 meters at the bottom of the Abay valley.

== Demographics ==
The 2007 national census reported a total population for this woreda of 17,996, of whom 9,192 were men and 8,804 were women; 2,725 or 15.14% of its population were urban dwellers. The majority of the inhabitants said they were Protestant, with 48.62% of the population reporting they observed this belief, while 29.7% of the population were Moslem, 14.51% practiced Ethiopian Orthodox Christianity, 5.54% practiced traditional beliefs, and 1.27% were Catholic.

Based on figures from the Central Statistical Agency in 2005, this woreda has an estimated total population of 12,230, of whom 6,341 are men and 5,889 are women. With an estimated area of 1,308.44 square kilometers, Sirba Abbay has a population density of 9.3 people per square kilometer which is greater than the Zone average of 7.61. Information is lacking on the towns of this woreda.

The 1994 national census reported a total population for this woreda of 9,221 in 1,818 households, of whom 4,802 were men and 4,419 were women; no urban inhabitants were reported for this woreda. The two largest ethnic groups reported in Sirba Abbay were the Gumuz (75.6%), and the Oromo (22.7%); all other ethnic groups made up 0.3% of the population. Gumuz is spoken as a first language by 68%, and Oromiffa by 29.6%; the remaining 0.2% spoke all other primary languages reported. Most of the inhabitants were Protestant, with 43.6% of the population reporting they professed that religion, while 31.7% were Muslim, and 25.4% observed Ethiopian Orthodox Christianity. Concerning education, 8.49% of the population were considered literate, which is less than the Zone average of 11.36%; 7.52% of children aged 7–12 were in primary school, a negligible number of the children aged 13–14 were in junior secondary school, and none of the inhabitants aged 15–18 in senior secondary school. Concerning sanitary conditions, 0.6% of all houses had access to safe drinking water, and 0.8% had toilet facilities at the time of the census.
