= Undu language =

Berta dialect of Benishangul-Gumuz, Ethiopia

Undu
- Region: Benishangul-Gumuz
- Ethnicity: Berta people
- Language family: Nilo-Saharan?: Berta; Undu

Language codes
- ISO 639-3: –
- Glottolog: undu1236

Undu is an erstwhile dialect of Berta that is distinct enough to be considered a separate language.
