= Bambasi =

Place in Benishangul-Gumuz Region, Ethiopia

Bambashi Abba Moti
- Town
- Location within Ethiopia
- Coordinates: 9°45′N 34°44′E
- Country: Ethiopia
- Region: Benishangul-Gumuz
- Zone: Asosa
- Elevation: 1,668 m (5,472 ft)

Population (2005)
  - Total: 7,166
- Time zone: UTC+3 (EAT)

Bambashi (also known as Abba Moti) is a town in western Ethiopia. The town is named after the highest point in the Assosa Zone of the Benishangul-Gumuz Region, Mount Bambashi. Bambashi has a longitude and latitude of 9°45′N 34°44′E with an elevation of 1668 meters above sea level. It is the administrative center of Bambashi woreda.

Bambashi is located on the Gimbi-Assosa road, making the town one of the few in the Region accessible by motor vehicle with the rest of Ethiopia.

== History ==
In the later 19th century, Bambasi was seat of the Sheikhdom of Bambasi, which had been established following the conquest of Ismail bin Muhammad Ali, son of Wali Muhammad Ali. Although it was a notorious center of the slave trade, by the 1880s the Sheikhdom derived a significant share of its revenue from taxing the salt trade between the rest of Sudan and the nearby Oromos.

A description of Bambasi in the Guido (published in 1938) describes it as consisting of three groups of houses at the base of Mount Bambasi, and supplied with abundant water and a market. The town was captured by the Oromo Liberation Front (OLF) on 7 January 1990, and six Cuban doctors and nurses were taken hostages after five days of heavy fighting. In response government aircraft subjected Bambasi to aerial attacks; details on the casualties are not available. The following month, the OLF clandestine radio reported that the group had killed 84 government soldiers in a clash between Bambasi and Mendi.

On 2 April 2007, local Muslims in Bambasi raided the house of evangelist Tolosa Megersa, resulting in the death of six of his cattle and sheep. Five days later, the home of another local Christian leader, Lemmu Abdissa, was raided resulting in the destruction of all his property including 8,815 pounds of grain.

== Demographics ==
Based on figures from the Central Statistical Agency in 2005, Bambasi has an estimated total population of 7,166 of whom 3,653 are men and 3,513 are women.

According to the 1994 national census, its total population was 4,164 of whom 2,114 were men and 2,050 were women. The ethnic breakdown was 41.47% Amhara, 33.02% Oromo, 17.31% Berta (or Jebelawi, including Fadashi), 5.38% Tigray and 2.81% others. Concerning religion, 44.24% were Muslims, 48.08% Orthodox Christians and 4.68% Protestants.

The Bambassi language, sometimes also known as "Mao of Bambassi", is indigenous to the town and its immediate environments, and takes its international name after it.
