= Felege Selam =

Felege Selam Mender Arat
- Location within Ethiopia
- Coordinates: 11°20′N 36°27′E
- Country: Ethiopia
- Region: Benishangul-Gumuz
- Special woreda: Pawe

Government
  - Mr.: Mulat Tazebew, CUD representative who won for 2005 election
- Elevation: 2,054 m (6,739 ft)

Population (2005)
  - Total: 2,907
- Time zone: UTC+3 (EAT)

Felege Selam (formerly known as Mender 4) is a town in western Ethiopia. One of three located in the Pawe special woreda of the Benishangul-Gumuz Region, it has a latitude and longitude of 11°20′N 36°27′E with an elevation of 2054 meters above sea level.

The town gives its name to a parliamentary constituency; the current Member of Parliament for Felege Selam on the House of Peoples' Representatives is Mulat Tazebew Nigatu, who has held the position since 2005.

Felege Selam was founded as one of the resettlement projects under the Derg in the years 1984–1986, when it was known as Mender 4 (or "Left 4", because the settlement was located on the left side of the Beles River). The town has been the scene of violent confrontations between the indigenous Gumuz and newcomers brought to the area by the resettlement project: the first such clash occurred 18 December 1991 when a number of the Gumuz attacked the town, killing 58 resettlers from Kambaata and Hadiya, reportedly in retaliation for the accidental death by shooting of a member of the Gumuz. The next clash happened 1 September 1993 when Gumuz men attacked the Felege Selam market, killing 20 people and wounding many more. Later that month (12 September), the townspeople organized themselves and retaliated with an attack on local Gumuz, killing several. At this point the authorities stepped in and enforced a cease-fire between the groups. Despite these conflicts, relations between the newcomers and the Gumuz are smooth in other ways. According to Wolde-Selassie Abbute, both parties interact and exchange goods at the markets in Felege Selam and Ketema, with the Gumuz selling finger millet, sorghum, pumpkins, peppers and fire wood. Gumuz children attend the local schools together with the children of the newcomers.

== Demographics ==
Based on figures from the Central Statistical Agency in 2005, Felege Selam has an estimated total population of 2,907, of whom 1,395 are men and 1,512 are women. According to the 1994 national census, its total population was 1,689 of whom 807 were men and 882 were women.
