= Menge, Ethiopia =

Menge
- Location within Ethiopia
- Coordinates: 10°23′N 34°46′E
- Country: Ethiopia
- Region: Benishangul-Gumuz
- Zone: Asosa Zone
- Elevation: 1,123 m (3,684 ft)

Population (2005)
  - Total: 318
- Time zone: UTC+3 (EAT)

Menge is a town in western Ethiopia. Located in the Asosa Zone of the Benishangul-Gumuz Region, Menge has a latitude and longitude of 10°23′N 34°46′E with an elevation of 1123 meters above sea level.

Records at the Nordic Africa Institute website provide details of a primary school in Menge in 1968. In 1970, a group of three German travelers travelling down the Abay River describe Menge as a settlement with masonry houses, and record that it had a police station.

== Demographics ==
Based on figures from the Central Statistical Agency (CSA), in 2005 this town has an estimated total population of 318, of whom 176 were males and 142 were females. It is the largest settlement in Menge woreda.

The 1994 national census reported its total population was 185, of whom 102 were males and 83 were females. The three largest ethnic groups reported in Menge were: the Berta 118, Oromo 27, and Amhara 27. Berta is spoken as a first language by 117 inhabitants, Oromiffa by 39, and Amharic by 28. 139 of the inhabitants said they were Muslim, 39 practiced Ethiopian Orthodox Christianity, and seven were Protestant. The CSA categorized 103 of the inhabitants as being part of the labor pool (four of whom were unemployed), and 45 as not part of it.

Details about the housing in Menge provide a sense of the quality of the life of its inhabitants. All of the 52 housing units in the town were permanent, with an average of 3.5 persons per house; 45 sheltered one household, while 7 sheltered two, while 47 housing structures had one room and 5 had two. Concerning water supply and sanitation, residents of only 48 units obtained water from a protected well, and 48 had no toilet while the remaining 4 shared the use of a pit toilet with others. None of these houses were provided for bathing. Lighting for 48 units was furnished by kerosene lanterns; four had no lighting. The average rent for housing in Menge was reported to be 22.77 Birr a month, less than both the average reported for the Region of 26.64 Birr and the average reported for the Zone of 36.19 Birr.
