= Berta languages =

Languages in Ethiopia and Sudan

Berta
- Funj
- Geographic distribution: Ethiopia, Sudan
- Linguistic classification: Nilo-Saharan?: Berta
- Subdivisions: Maiyu (Berta); Fadashi; Undu; Wabosh–Beleje Gonfoye

Language codes
- ISO 639-3: wti
- Glottolog: bert1248
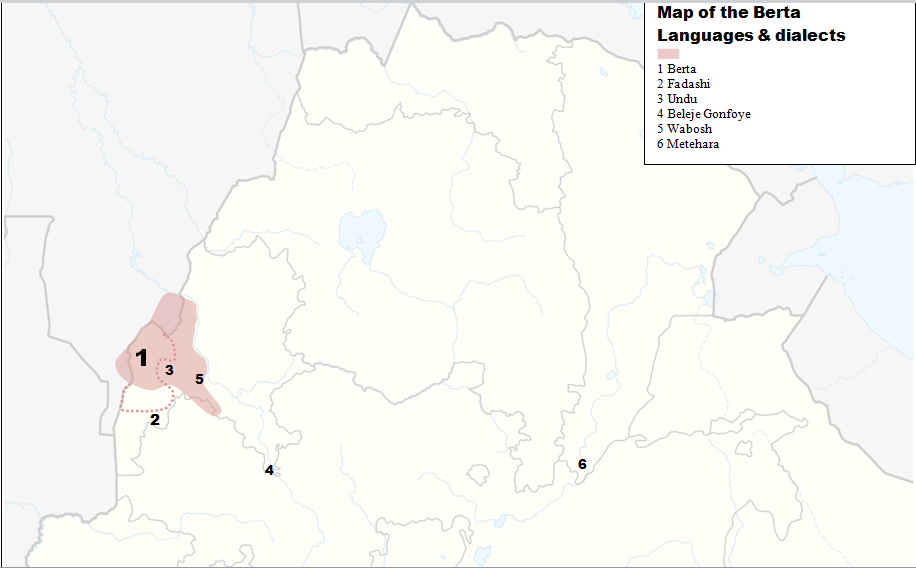

The Berta languages, or Funj, traditionally considered dialects of a single language, are Gebeto (Berta proper), Fadashi, and Undu. They are either a small family (or language isolate) of their own, or a primary branch of the Nilo-Saharan language family.

Berta has the typical word order subject–verb–object. It is a tonal language. It has significantly influenced some of the Eastern Jebel languages. The Arabic name "Beni-Shangul" (as in the Ethiopian province of Benishangul-Gumuz) derives from a Berta expression (with bele "rock/stone" misanalyzed as Arabic beni "sons").

== Varieties ==
Bremer (2016) surveys the following 6 varieties of Berta, providing word lists for them as well. Geographical information is from Bremer (2016:2–3). With the exception of Metehara, all surveyed Berta varieties are spoken in the Benishangul-Gumuz Region of Ethiopia. There is very little data for Berta varieties spoken in Sudan.

- Maiyu, the most prestigious and also the most innovative Berta variety, is spoken in and around Asosa and Kurmuk, along the border with Sudan.
- Fadashi is spoken in and around Bambasi.
- Undulu is spoken in and around Undulu.
- Beleje Gonfoye, the most conservative dialect, is isolated from other Berta communities, as it is located much further to the southeast than the other Berta varieties. It is called Gebeto by Fleming (1960, 1974; as cited in Bender 1989). Due to the similarities with Wabosh, they may have ultimately came from the Wabosh community in Daleti. There are several hundred speakers of this variety, which is spoken in Fwafwate and surrounding areas of the Didessa Valley.
- Wabosh is closely related to Beleje Gonfoye, and is spoken in Daleti.
- Metehara is spoken just to the east of Awash National Park in Oromia.

== See also ==
- Berta word lists (Wiktionary)
