= Didessa National Park =

National park in Benishangul-Gumuz Region, Ethiopia

- Deddessa National Park
- IUCN category II (national park)
- Location within Ethiopia
- Location: Kamashi Zone, Benishangul-Gumuz Region, Ethiopia
- Coordinates: 8°40′N 36°34′E
- Established: 2017
- Governing body: Culture, Sport and Tourism Bureau of Benishangul-Gumuz Region

Didessa National Park is a national park in western Ethiopia. It is located in the valley of the Didessa River, in Kamashi Zone of Benishangul-Gumuz Region in western Ethiopia. It covers an area of 1300 km^{2}.

It was designated a national park in 2017 by the Government of Ethiopia. It had previously been designated a wildlife sanctuary. It is known for its lush forests, towering waterfalls, and escarpments. This is home to a wide range of wildlife, including baboons, warthogs, bushbuck, and Ethiopian wolf.
