= Wetawit =

Wetawit may refer to:

- the Wetawit people
- the Wetawit language
