= Almu =

- Town
- Country: Ethiopia
- Regional state: Benishangul-Gumuz Region
- Woreda: Pawe Special Woreda

Population (2005)
  - Total: 3,419

Almu is a town in western Ethiopia, the largest of three towns located in the Pawe Special Woreda of the Benishangul-Gumuz Region.

== Demographics ==
Based on data from the Central Statistical Agency (CSA), in 2005 this town had an estimated total population of 3,419 of whom 1,702 were males and 1,717 were females.

The 1994 national census reported its total population was 1,987 of whom 985 were males and 1,002 were females. The five largest ethnic groups reported in Almu were: the Amhara 1457 (73.3%), the Awi a subgroup of the Agew 258 (13%), Tigrinyan 111 (5.6%), the Oromo 65 (3.3%), and the Hadiya 28 (1.4%). Amharic was the first language of 1529 inhabitants (77%), Awngi 216 (11%), Tigrinyan 107 (5.3%), Oromo 60 (3%), and Hadiya 29 (1.5%). The majority practiced Ethiopian Orthodox Christianity, with 1800 of the inhabitants reporting they embraced that belief, 135 were Muslim, and 49 were Protestant. The CSA categorized 1,192 of the inhabitants as being part of the labor pool (133 of whom were unemployed), and 449 as not part of it.

Details about the housing in Almu are as follows. Of the 598 housing units in the town, 481 were permanent and 105 improvised (defined by the CSA as a "makeshift shelter or structure built of waste materials") with an average of 3.2 persons per house; 476 sheltered one household, 104 seven sheltered two and 18 three or more households. Concerning water supply and sanitation, residents of 117 units had running water obtained water from a protected well and 457 obtained it from a shared external tap; 94 had no toilet while 133 had a private flush toilet and 332 used a shared flush toilet. For bathing, 102 reported they had no bathing facilities in their house, 4 had a private bath tub, 125 had a private shower and 363 used shared shower facilities. Lighting for 547 units was by electricity while the lighting in 43 units was furnished by kerosene lanterns. The average rent for housing in Almu was reported to be 22.54 Birr a month, more than the average reported for the Region of 14.78 Birr but less than the average reported for the Zone of 36.19 Birr.
