= Ketema =

Ketema Addis Alem
- Location within Ethiopia
- Coordinates: 11°03′N 36°19′E
- Country: Ethiopia
- Region: Benishangul-Gumuz
- Special Woreda: Pawe

Population (2005)
  - Total: 3,262
- Time zone: UTC+3 (EAT)

Ketema (formerly known as Mender 7) is a town in western Ethiopia. The name comes from the Amharic word ketema, meaning a fortified encampment; it is also a common personal name in Ethiopia. It is one of three towns located in the Metekel Zone and Pawe special woreda of the Benishangul-Gumuz Region.

== Overview ==
Ketema was founded as one of the resettlement projects under the Derg in the years 1984–86, when it was known as Mender 7 (or "Left 7"), because the settlement was located on the left side of the Beles River).

Ketema is located near the market of Deq, a local market which existed before the resettlement program and is frequented by the Agew and Gumuz peoples.

Based on figures from the Central Statistical Agency in 2005, Ketema has an estimated total population of 3,262 of whom 1,540 are men and 1,722 are women. According to the 1994 national census, its total population was 1,896 of whom 891 were men and 841 were women.
