= Wajja River =

RIver in Ethiopia

Wajja River Waja
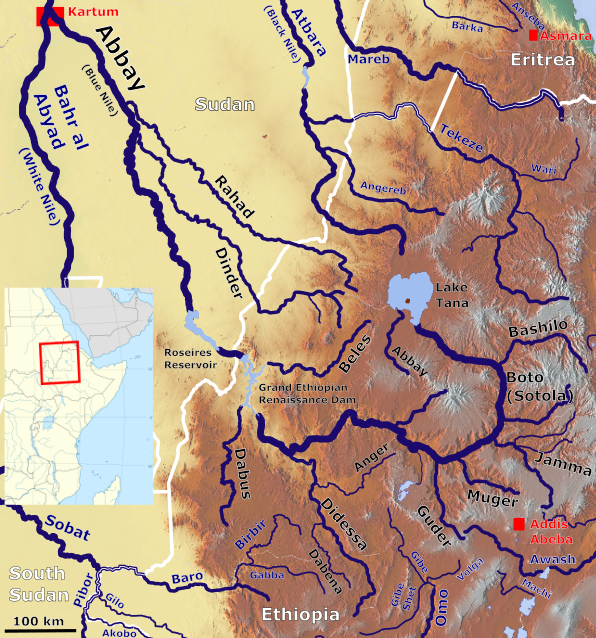
- Map of the Abay (Blue Nile) River Basin. The Wajja is not shown but flows into the Hanger River.

Location
- Country: Ethiopia

Physical characteristics
- Mouth: Hanger River
  - coordinates: 9°30′38.3″N 36°39′40.63″E
  - elevation: 1,303 m (4,275 ft)

Basin features
- Progression: Hanger → Didessa → Blue Nile → Nile → Mediterranean Sea
- River system: Nile Basin

The Wajja is a river of western Ethiopia. It is a tributary of the Hanger River, and part of the watershed of the Blue Nile, sometimes referred to as the Waja-Golesha Sub-basin.

== See also ==
- List of rivers of Ethiopia
