= Pawe special woreda =

Woreda in western Ethiopia

Pawe
- Special woreda
- Location within Ethiopia
- Coordinates: 11°20′N 36°20′E
- Country: Ethiopia
- Regional state: Benishangul-Gumuz Region

Population (2005)
  - Total: 45,552

Pawe is one of the 20 woredas in the Benishangul-Gumuz Region of Ethiopia. Because it is not part of any Zone in Benishangul-Gumuz, it is considered a Special woreda, an administrative subdivision which is similar to an autonomous area. It is a model special woreda in the country for its demographic diversity and huge mix in population while sustaining a peaceful co-existence. Pawe is nominally part of Metekel, bordered on the east and north by the Amhara Region. The largest town in Pawe is Almu; other towns include Felege Selam and Ketema.

== History ==
Pawe acquired a sinister connotation amongst many Ethiopians, for it was the location of the largest of the resettlement projects under the Derg in the years 1984-6. According to the governmental Relief and Rehabilitation Commission, 16,425 individuals had been moved from Gojjam to Pawe in that period. More settlers were recruited from the chronically land-hungry Kambaata and Hadiya regions, as well Welo in the north. While the goals of the resettlement plans—moving people from the overcrowded and famine-afflicted northern districts into underpopulated and more fertile ones in the south of the country—were justifiable, the actual resettlement was done in an arbitrary and disastrous manner, according to Paul B. Henze:

Derg operatives soon resorted to drastic methods, e.g. surrounding busy market places and loading people onto trucks. Families were divided. The resettlement sites were poorly prepared. Destitute "settlers" found themselves dumped in unfamiliar, malarial terrain. Tens of thousands died.

How Pawe came to be selected as a suitable site for resettlement is no longer known; no adequate investigation of the area had been carried out before the choice was made, nor were the indigenous peoples consulted. Nevertheless, in October 1984 the area was presented by local officials to their superiors, and after a local visit President Mengistu Haile Mariam endorsed the choice, pointing out that Pawe was endowed with large tracts of "unused" land, virgin soil, adequate rainfall, sufficient forest and mineral resources and a good climate. At its peak, around 1987/1988 (1980 E.C.), the resettlement population had a total population of 82,106 people (21,994 heads of households and 60,112 dependent family members) living in 48 villages.

According to Henze "many died and the site became a target of harassment by EPRP remnants operating in the area. In spite of heavy investment of Italian [humanitarian] money and manpower over several years, it remained an unsuccessful experiment." Wolde-Selassie Abbute's statistics show that the population declined as time went on (most dramatically between 1990 and 1993 when the total population fell by over half), to stabilize around 1995 with the arrival of voluntary resettlers from the Amhara Region who took over abandoned land, to rise to a total number of 41,691 by 1995.

== Demographics ==
Based on the 2007 Census conducted by the Central Statistical Agency of Ethiopia (CSA), this woreda has a total population of 45,552, of whom 23,265 are men and 22,287 women. 10,068 or 22.1% of population are urban inhabitants. A total of 11,808 households were counted in this woreda, which results in an average of 3.86 persons to a household, and 11,436 housing units. The six largest ethnic groups reported in the Pawe special woreda were the Amhara (69.71%), the Kambaata (18%), the Hadiya (14.5%), Agaw-Awi (1.05%), the Oromo (2.22%), and all other ethnic groups made up 0.6% of the population. Main languages are Amharic (71.88%), Kambaata (14.81%), Hadiya (14.44%), Awngi (1.25%), the Somali (1.92%), and Oromo (1.88%). The majority of the inhabitants practiced Ethiopian Orthodox Christianity, with 63.49% of the population reporting that they held that belief, while 26.46% were Muslim, 7.61% were Protestant, and 2.38% were Catholic.

Based on figures from the Central Statistical Agency in 2005, this woreda has an estimated total population of 49,758, of whom 25,320 are men and 24,438 are women; 15,203 or 30.6% of its population are urban dwellers. With an estimated area of 567.51 square kilometers, Pawe has an estimated population density of 87.68 people per square kilometer.

The 1994 national census reported a total population for this woreda of 30,741 in 10,050 households, of whom 15,284 were males and 15,457 were females; 3,253 or 10.58% of its population were urban dwellers. The five largest ethnic groups reported in Pawe were the Amhara (65%), the Kambaata (16%), the Hadiya (14%), the Oromo (2.6%), and the Awi (3.1%); all other ethnic groups made up 1.3% of the population. Amharic is spoken as a first language by 76%, 18% speak Kambaata, 16% Hadiya, 2.3% Afan Oromo, and 1.4% speak Awngi; the remaining 23.4% spoke all other primary languages reported. The majority practiced Ethiopian Orthodox Christianity, with 64.4% of the population reporting they embraced that religion, while 20.4% were Muslim, and 9.6% Protestants. Concerning education, 39.86% of the population were considered literate; 32.62% of children aged 7–12 were in primary school; 8.9% of the children aged 13–14 were in junior secondary school; and 1.62% of the inhabitants aged 15–18 were in senior secondary school. Concerning sanitary conditions, 100% of the urban houses and 91% of all houses had access to safe drinking water at the time of the census; 65.4% of the urban and 43.2% of all houses had toilet facilities.

Wolde-Selassie provides a further dimension to the woreda demographics. He has produced a table showing in 1995 75.3% of the inhabitants were individuals who were part of the resettlement project, 10.7% were voluntary or displaced migrants, and 14% were town dwellers.
