= Bulen =

Town in Ethiopia

Coordinates: 10°36′12″N 36°05′00″E

Bulen is a town in western Ethiopia. Located in the Metekel Zone of the Benishangul-Gumuz Region, Bulen is the largest settlement in Bulen woreda. Bulan (often spelt Bulen) is a woreda (district) and town in the Metekel Zone of Ethiopia's Benishangul-Gumuz Regional State. Bulen town is the largest settlement in Bulen woreda and has been mentioned in connection with conflict and security incidents in the region.

Based on figures from the Central Statistical Agency in 2005, this town has an estimated total population of 5,615, of whom 2,654 were males and 2,961 were females. According to the 1994 national census, its total population was 3,264 of whom 1,536 were males and 1,728 were females.
