= Dabus River =

River in southwestern Ethiopia

Dabus River Yabus
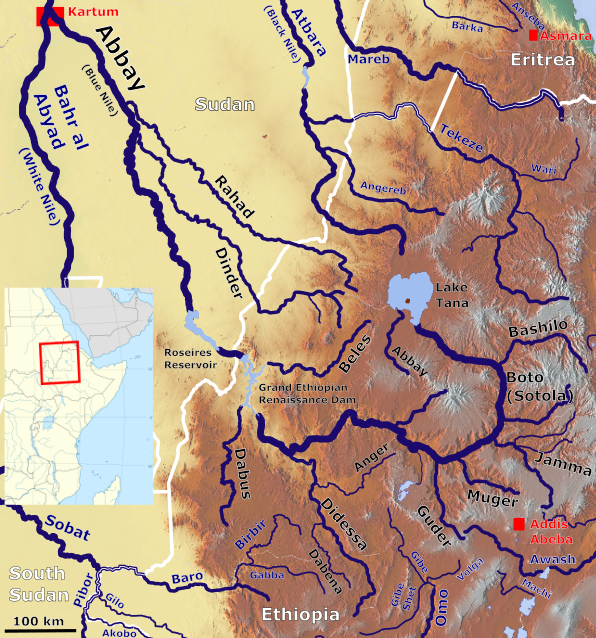
- Map showing the Abbay basin, with the Dabus River (Center bottom)

Location
- Country: Ethiopia

Physical characteristics
- Mouth: Blue Nile
  - coordinates: 10°36′38″N 35°8′58″E
- Basin size: 21,032 km^{2} (8,121 sq mi)

Basin features
- Progression: Blue Nile → Nile → Mediterranean Sea
- River system: Nile Basin

The Dabus is a north-flowing tributary of the Abay River in southwestern Ethiopia. The Dabus has a drainage area of about 21,032 km^{2} (8,121 sq mi).

The Dabus was formerly known as the Yabus, and local speakers still refer to it by that name, without distinction for the Yabus in Sudan that is a tributary of the White Nile. Juan Maria Schuver was the first European explorer to determine that they were two separate rivers, and in 1882 proved false the rumor that these rivers flowed from the same mountain lake.

It is important as a boundary both in cultural and political terms. According to Dunlop, who explored the region in 1935, the river is where "the Christian church of the Oromo people gives place to the mosque, and the Oromo greeting to the universal Muslim politeness: 'Salaam Aleikum.' In contrast to the Oromo and Amhara dress, consisting of a shirt with close-fitting sleeves, jodpurs and chamma, they wear a white skull-cap, pugaree, flowing coat with loose sleeves and baggy trousers." In political terms, its course defines not only part of the boundary between the Benishangul-Gumuz and the Oromia Regions, but also the entire shared boundary of the Asosa and Kamashi Zones of the Benishangul-Gumuz Region.

The Dabus has been a historically significant source for gold, where the local inhabitants have used placer mining to recover the mineral.

== See also ==
- List of Ethiopian rivers
