= Ernst Marno =

Austrian explorer

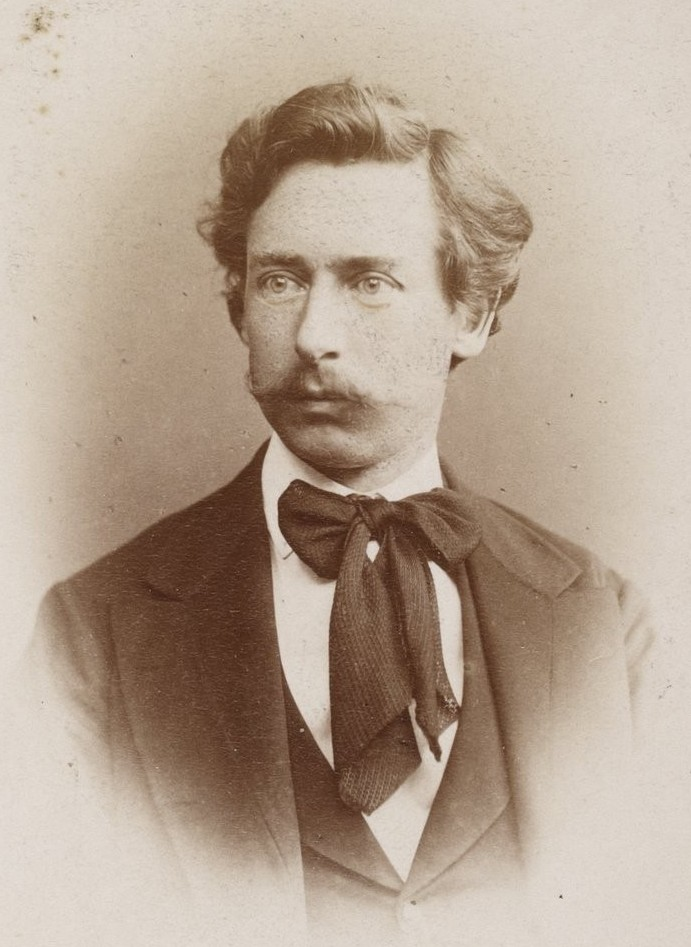
Ernst Marno

Ernst Marno (13 January 1844, Vienna – 31 August 1883, Khartoum) was an explorer in East Africa from Austria-Hungary. He traveled extensively through the Blue Nile area and the Sudanese-Ethiopian borderland, as well as Kordofan and southern Sudan. His experiences were narrated in two books, which provide information about the Nilo-Saharan populations of the area before the colonial occupation of Sudan by the British Empire.

He himself married a Dinka, who had converted to Catholicism. From 1878 on, Marno was based in Fashoda as an officer at the service of the Khedivate of Egypt and later he was appointed governor of the Sudanese cities of Famaka and Fazogli. During his stay in Sudan he met other European explorers, like Romolo Gessi and Juan Maria Schuver. He died in Khartoum of illness.

== Writings ==
- Marno, E. (1874): Reisen im Gebiete des blauen und weissen Nil, im egyptischen Sudan und den angrenzenden Negerländern, in den Jahren 1869 bis 1873. Vienna: C. Gerold. The whole book is available at Google Books
- Marno, E. 1879. Reise in der egyptischen Aequatorial-Provinz und in Kordofan in den Jahren 1874–1876. Vienna: A. Hölder. The whole book is available at Google Books

== Sources ==
- A short bibliographical sketch in W. James, G. Baumann and D. Johnson (1996): Juan Maria Schuver's travels in North East Africa 1880–1883. Hakluyt Society, London, p. xcix.
