= Menges =

Menges may refer to:

- Mengeš, a town in the Upper Carniola region of Slovenia
  - Municipality of Mengeš, the municipality centred on the Slovenian town
- NK Mengeš, a former football club from the Slovenian town
- Saint-Menges, a commune in the Ardennes department in northern France
- USS Menges (DE-320), an Edsall-class destroyer escort built for the United States Navy during World War II

People

- Jim Menges (born 1951), American volleyball player
- Chris Menges (born 1940), an English cinematographer and film director (son of Herbert Menges and nephew of Isolde Menges)
- Constantine Menges (1939–2004), an American scholar, author, professor, and Latin American specialist for the CIA
- Emily Menges (born 1992), American soccer player
- Franklin Menges (1858–1956), a Republican member of the U.S. House of Representatives from Pennsylvania
- Herbert Menges (1902–1972), an English composer and conductor (father of Chris Menges and brother of Isolde Menges)
- Herbert Hugo Menges (1917–1941), an American soldier
- Isolde Menges (1893–1976), an accomplished violinist who was most active in the first part of the 20th century (sister of Herbert Menges and aunt of Chris Menges)
- Joyce Menges, an actress from 1972 to 1975
- Karl Heinrich Menges (1908–1999), German linguist
- Louis Menges (1888–1969), an American amateur football (soccer) player
- Otto Menges (1917–1944), highly decorated German soldier in World War II

== See also ==
- Menge (disambiguation)
