= List of districts in the Benishangul-Gumuz region =

This is a list of the 20 woredas, or districts, in the Benishangul-Gumuz region of Ethiopia.
