= Resettlement and villagization in Ethiopia =

Villagization operations in Ethiopia

Resettlement and villagization in Ethiopia has been an issue from the late nineteenth century up to the present, due to the overcrowded population of the Ethiopian Highlands. As the population of Ethiopia has increased in the twentieth century, the need to move inhabitants has only increased as available cropland per family declined to its current level of less than one hectare per farmer.

== Precursors ==
The policy of encouraging voluntary resettlement and villagization in Ethiopia began in 1958, when the government established the first known planned resettlement in Sidamo Province.

== Resettlement under the Derg ==
Shortly after the 1974 revolution, as part of their policy of land reform it became Derg policy to accelerate resettlement. Article 18 of the 1975 Land Reform Proclamation stated that "the government shall have the responsibility to settle peasants or to establish cottage industries to accommodate those who, as a result of distribution of land . . . remain with little or no land." Accordingly, in 1975/76 there were eighty-eight settlement centers accommodating 38,818 households. The government conducted most of these resettlement programs under the auspices of the Relief and Rehabilitation Commission (RRC) and the Ministry of Agriculture and Rural Development. By 1982 there were 112 planned settlements populated by more than 120,000 people. The settlements were concentrated mainly in the south and southwest. In 1984 Addis Ababa announced its intention to resettle 1.5 million people from the drought-affected northern regions to the south and southwest, where arable land was plentiful. By 1986, according to Mulatu Wubne, the government had resettled more than 600,000 people. More than 250,000 went to Welega; about 150,000 settled in the Gambela area of Illubabor; and just over 100,000 went to Pawe, the largest planned resettlement in Gojjam and largely sustained by Italian financial support. In addition, another 78,000 went to Kaffa, Shewa, and western Begemder.

In mid-1986 the government halted the resettlement program, largely to fend off the negative reaction from the international community. Richard Pankhurst, in his review of the book Politics and the Ethiopian Famine, 1984-1985, notes that some critics of the regime at the time compared "the resettlement centres to Hitler's concentration camps", and having visited them noted that Ethiopia is "a poor and economically underdeveloped country. Resettlement is therefore being carried out 'on a shoe-string', and the centres, like the country at large, face many difficulties." But in November 1987 the program resumed, and in March 1988 Mengistu Haile Mariam spoke of the need to move at least 7 million people; 100,000 - 200,000 were resettled when the program resumed in 1987 and March 1988 when it was suspended. He claimed resettlement would resolve the country's recurring drought problem and would ease population pressure from northern areas where the land had been badly overused. Western donors and governments, whom Addis Ababa expected to help with the program, remained apprehensive of the government's intentions, however. Some believed that the plan to resettle 1.5 million people by 1994 was unrealistic, given the country's strained finances. Others argued that resettlement was a ploy to depopulate areas of unrest in the ongoing conflict, particularly in Eritrea and Tigray. Additional arguments against resettlement included charges of human rights violations, forced separations of families, and lack of medical attention in resettlement centers, which resulted in thousands of deaths from malaria and sleeping sickness.

Gebru Tareke, studying the government records of this resettlement program, provides a more accurate picture. "Between 1984 and 1986," he writes, "594,190 people were hastily, forcibly, and pitilessly uprooted from the cool, dry highlands of Shewa, Tigray, and Wello to the hot, wet lowlands of Gojjam, Illubabor, Kafa and Wellega, and an estimated cost of 767 million birr (US $374 million)." Of this number, the largest group 367,016 or 62% came from Wollo; 108,241 or 18% from Shewa; 89,716 or 15% from Tigray. "The seven sites for settlement were randomly selected by Mengistu and Legesse Asfaw. No ecologists, agronomists, horticulturalists, economists, or anthropologists were consulted, and no consent from either the resettlers or the host population was solicited." The new settlers encountered harsh conditions: as many as 33,000 or 5.5% died from starvation and tropical diseases, while at least 84,000 or 14% more are believed to have fled these new settlements. As for the claims that the resettlement was primarily motivated to depopulate the rebel areas, or to establish buffer areas against the rebel groups, Gebru is largely dismissive, noting that no people were removed from Eritrea, for example, and that the population transferred from Tigray and Wollo were too small to have made any meaningful difference.

=== Villagization in the 1980s ===
In 1985 the government initiated a new relocation program known as villagization. The objectives of the program, which grouped scattered farming communities throughout the country into small village clusters, were to promote rational land use; conserve resources; provide access to clean water and to health and education services; and strengthen security. Government guidelines stipulated that villages were to house 200 to 300 households, with 100-square-meter compounds for each family.

In 1985 Addis Ababa established a national coordinating committee to oversee the villagization plan's implementation. By March 1986, about 4.6 million people in Shewa, Arsi, and Hararghe had been relocated into more than 4,500 villages. Although the government had villagized about 13 million people by 1989, international criticism, deteriorating security conditions, and lack of resources doomed the plan to failure. Nevertheless, Mengistu remained committed to the villagization concept.

Opponents of villagization argued that the scheme was disruptive to agricultural production because the government moved many farmers during the planting and harvesting seasons. There also was concern that villagization could have a negative impact on fragile local resources, particularly on water and grazing land; accelerate the spread of communicable diseases; and increase problems with plant pests and diseases. In early 1990, the government essentially abandoned villagization when it announced new economic policies that called for free-market reforms and a relaxation of centralized planning.

The pressure on large-scale state farms was under attack by Western donors, who channeled their agricultural aid to the peasant sector. These donors maintained that experiences elsewhere in Africa and in Eastern Europe and the Soviet Union had shown that state farms were inefficient and a drain on scarce resources.

== Voluntary resettlement in the 2000s ==
Voluntary resettlement programs were renewed in the mid-2000s, as the government encouraged farmers to move from less productive to more productive regions. Some new settlements showed promise; however, at others the problems of self-sufficiency once again reared their heads.

== See also ==
- Agriculture in Ethiopia
