= Asosa =

Capital of Benishangul-Gumuz Region, Ethiopia

Asosa Asoosaa (Oromo) አሶሳ (Amharic)
- Capital city
- Asosa
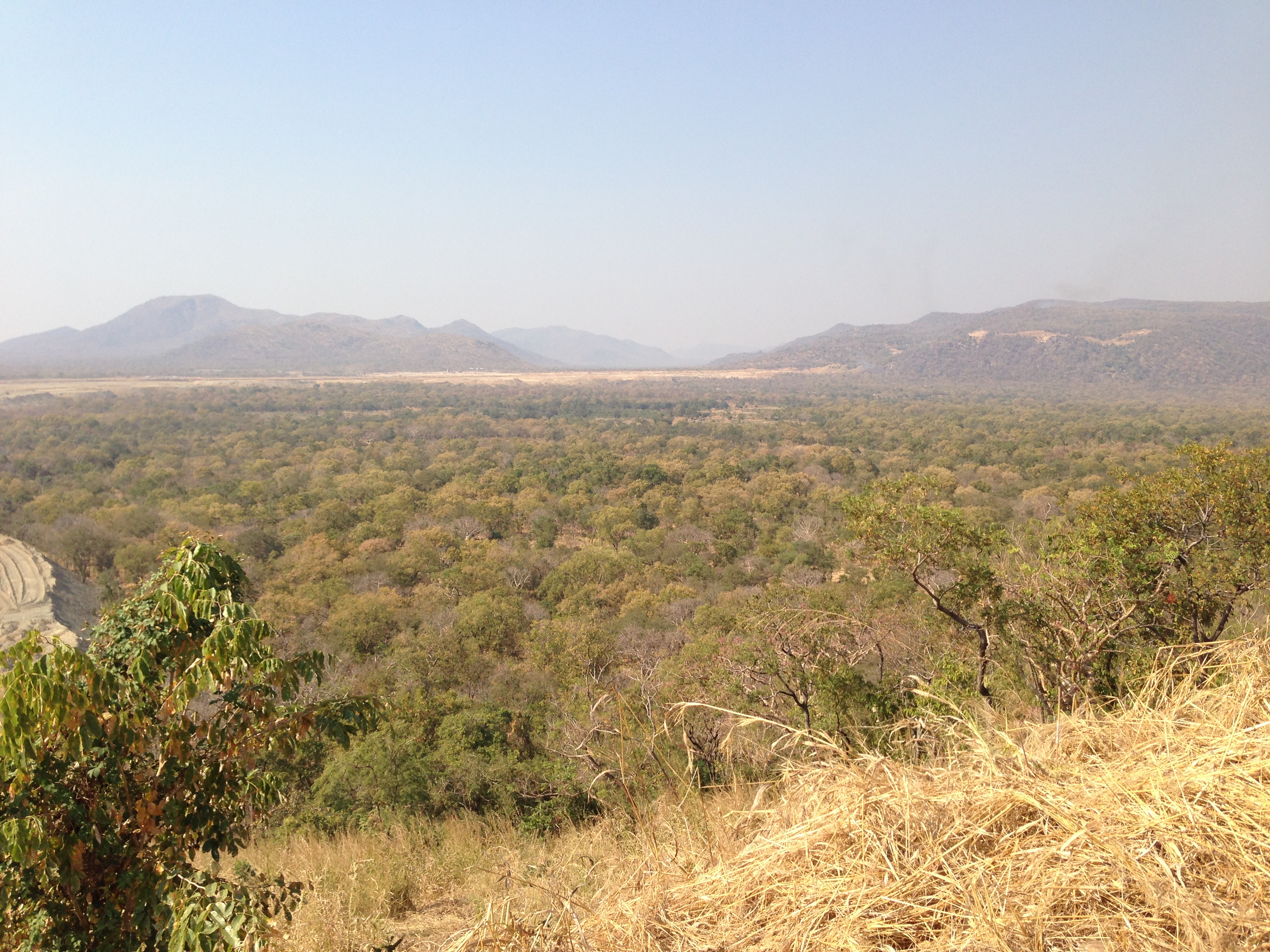
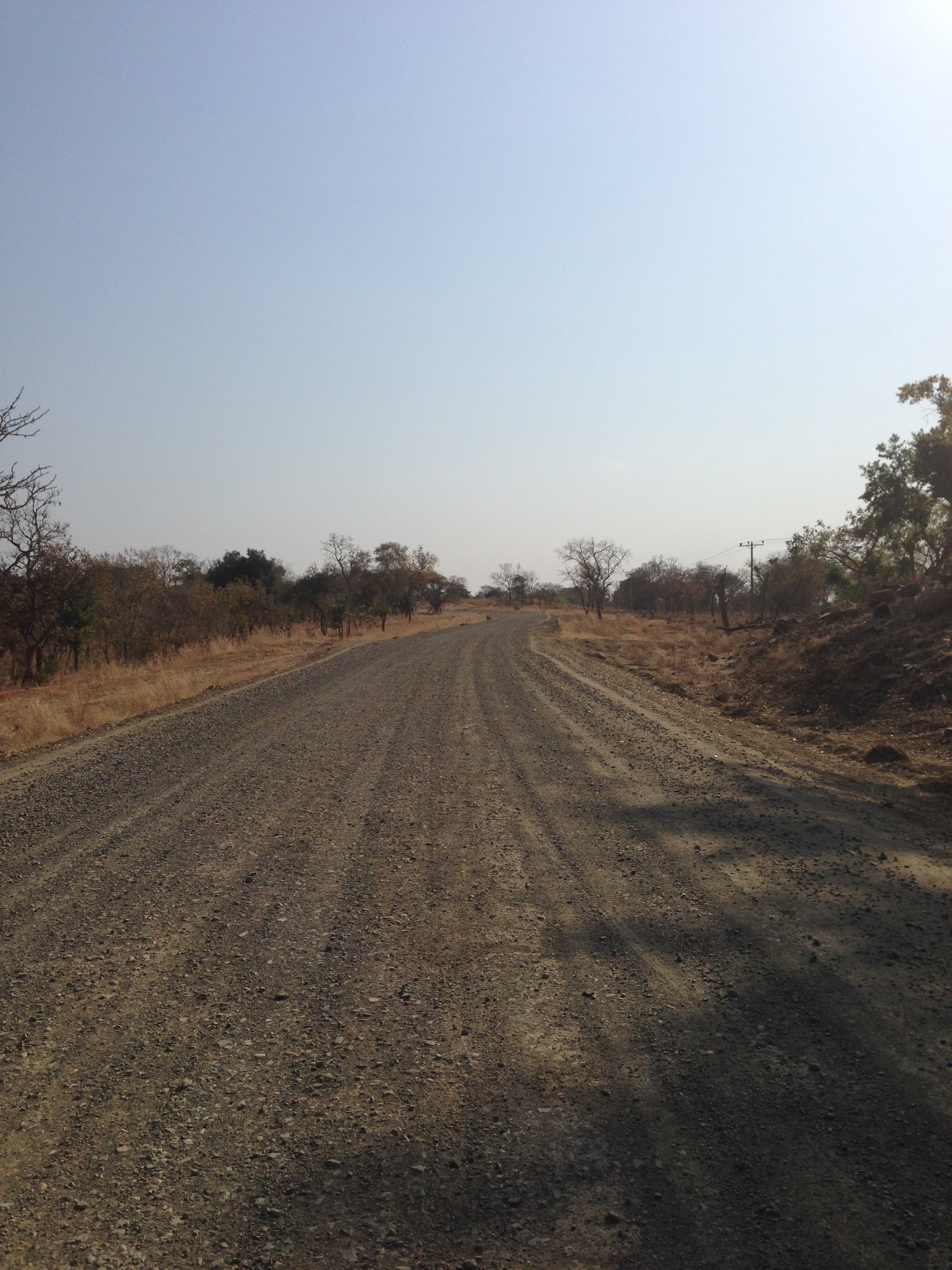
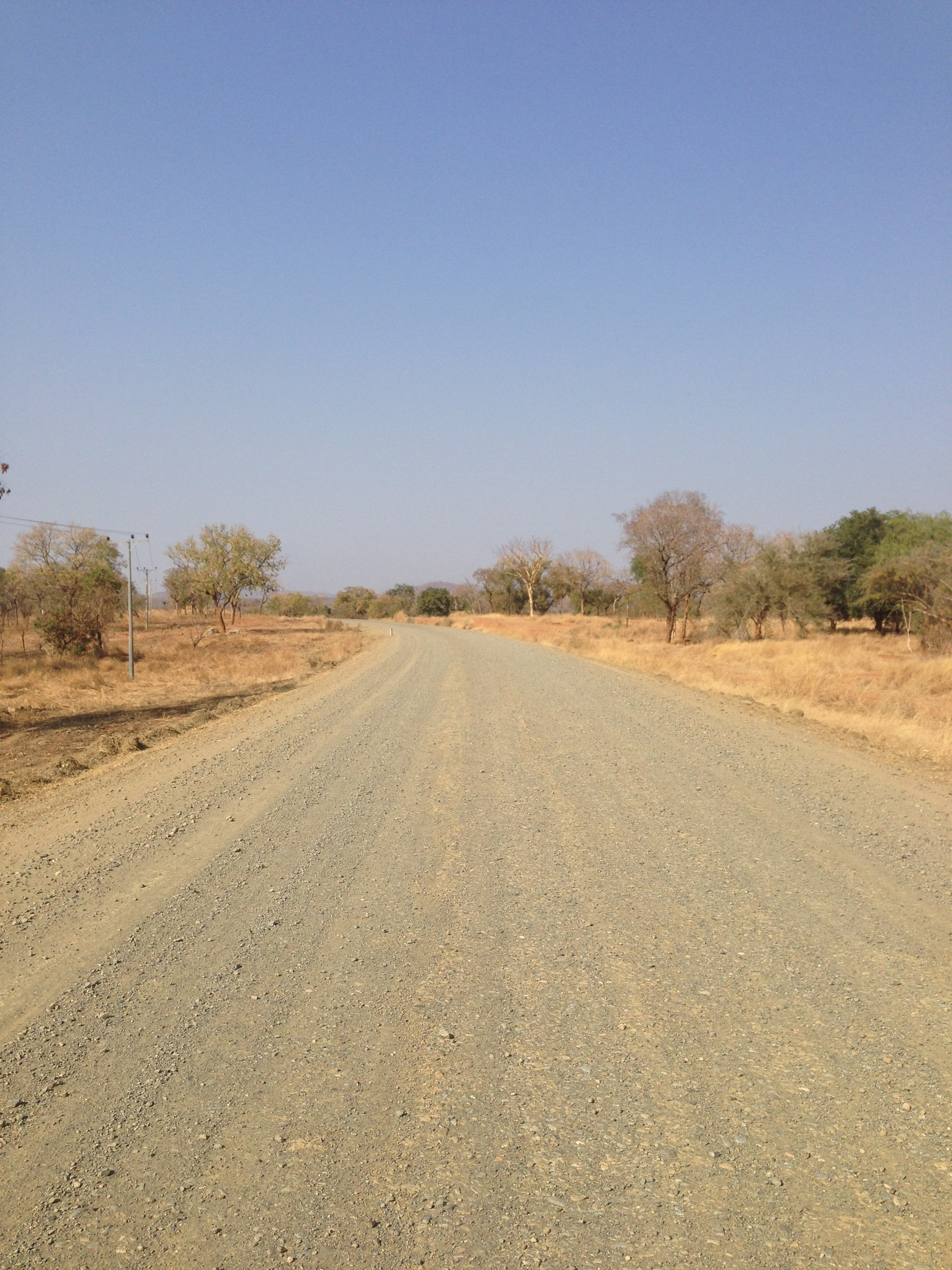
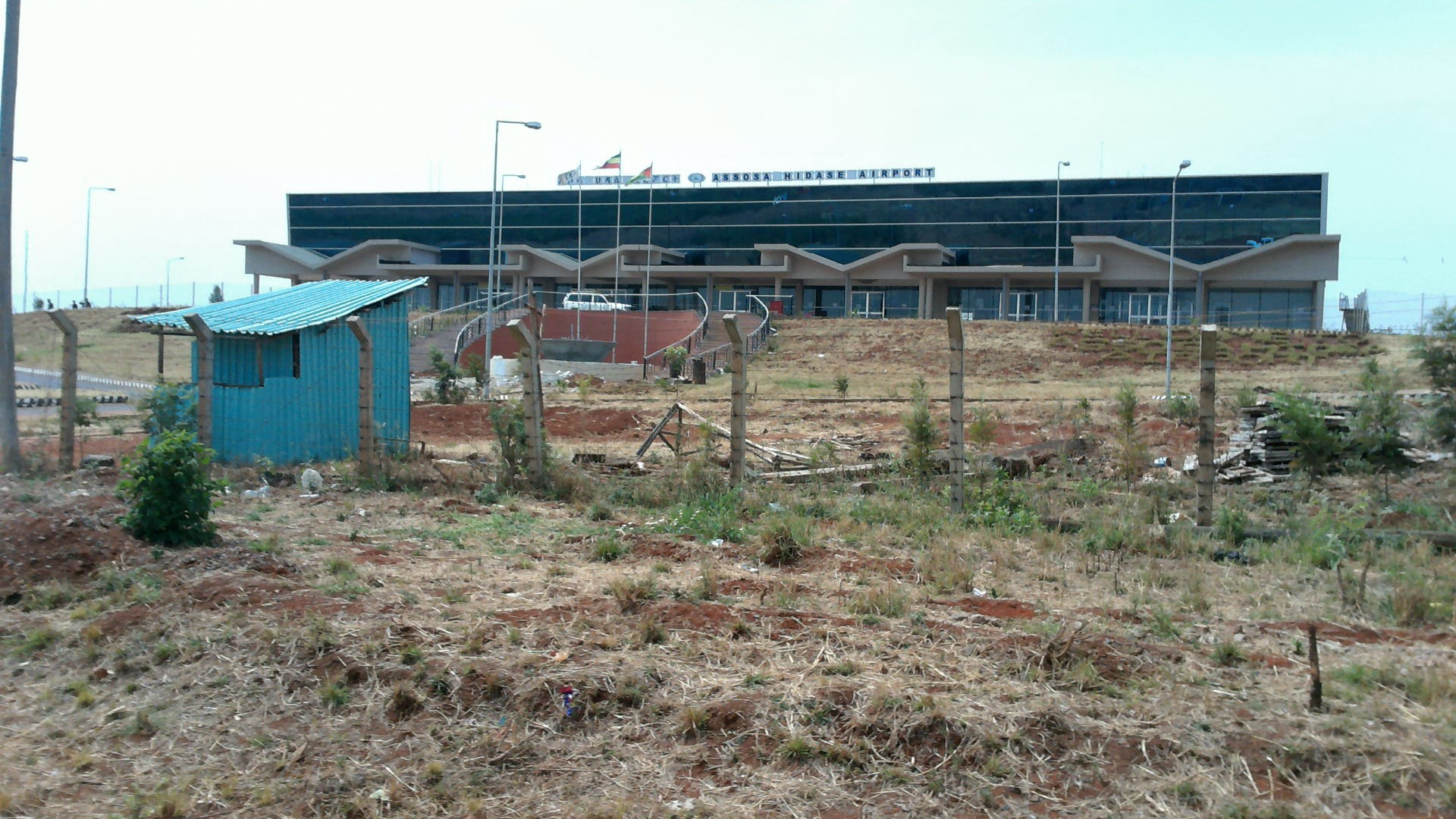
- From top left: Scene of Asosa's arid regions with the latter being Asosa Airport
- Nickname: አሶሳ
- Location within Ethiopia Location within the Horn of Africa Location within Africa
- Coordinates: 10°04′N 34°31′E
- Country: Ethiopia
- Region: (Benishangul-Gumuz Region) Benishangul-Gumuz
- Zone: Asosa
- Elevation: 1,570 m (5,150 ft)

Population (2005)
  - Total: 20,226
- Time zone: UTC+3 (EAT)

Asosa or Assosa is the capital of Benishangul-Gumuz Region, Ethiopia. Located in the Asosa Zone, this town has a latitude and longitude of 10°04′N 34°31′E, with an elevation of 1,570 meters.

== History ==
According to the Dutch explorer Juan Maria Schuver, who visited the town in 1881, Asosa was "a prosperous village as several slave-merchants live here" who travelled to Leqa Naqamte and to the Kwama people to purchase slaves. He also mentions that "fine views are obtained at Inzing [the earlier name for Asosa] into the forestclad ravines that plunge down into the White Nile basin."

A Belgian force from the Congo captured Asosa on 11 March 1941, destroying the Italian 10th Brigade and capturing 1,500 men.

During the Ethiopian Civil War, the Oromo Liberation Front (OLF) captured Asosa from the Derg in early January 1990, and held the city for a brief time. During the occupation, the government airforce subjected Asosa to aerial attacks several times that month, killing 19 people and wounding 20. Before the Derg withdrew from Asosa, it destroyed the town's only electricity generator, stole 1.8 million Birr from the bank, most of which were deposits from the local farmer cooperatives, and took any valuable items its troops could carry.

During the 1990s, Asosa was characterised by entire government office complexes of partially completed buildings, which John Young notes was "testimony to corrupt relations between politicians and contractors." Young continues, "Indicative of the scale of the problem, during a peace and development conference held in Asosa in June 1996, the then deputy prime minister, Tamrat Layne, dismissed the entire regional government and had many of its members imprisoned for corruption."

The governor of the town of Asosa, Ahmed Khalifa, on 7 July 2007 fled to Ad-Damazin, the capital of the Blue Nile State, in Sudan. Khalifa was accused by the Ethiopian authorities of offering concessions to Sudan on border issues. Sudan turned down a request to return Khalifa to Ethiopia, resulting in increased tensions between the two countries.

== Demographics ==
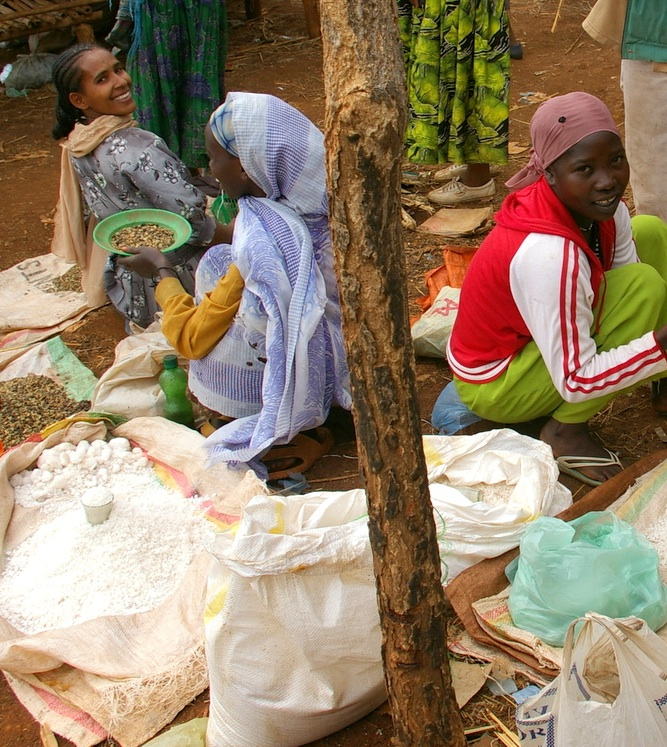
Market women in Asosa

Based on figures from the Central Statistical Agency in 2015, Asosa has an estimated total population of 20,226, of whom 10,929 are men and 9,297 are women.

The 1994 national census reported a total population for Asosa of 11,749 in 2,825 households, of whom 6,324 were men and 5,425 women. The six largest ethnic groups reported in this town were the Oromo (41.19%), the Amhara (29.93%), the Berta (17.39%), the Tigrayan (5.43%), the Sebat Bet Gurage (1.35%), and the Silt'e (1.29%); all other ethnic groups made up 3.42% of the population. Oromiffa was spoken as a first language by 44.42%, 31.53% spoke Amharic, 15.98% Berta, and 4.43% Tigrinya; the remaining 3.64% spoke all other primary languages reported. The majority of the inhabitants professed Ethiopian Orthodox Christianity, with 54.92% of the population having reported they practised that belief, while 29.75% of the population said they were Muslim, and 14.89% were Protestant. It is the largest settlement in Asosa woreda.

== Climate ==
The climate is a tropical savanna climate (Koppen: Aw), showing traits of a humid subtropical climate (Koppen: Cwa), with dry winters and warm and rainy summers. Droughts are common.

Climate data for Asosa
Month	Jan	Feb	Mar	Apr	May	Jun	Jul	Aug	Sep	Oct	Nov	Dec	Year
Record high °C (°F)	37.2 (99.0)	36.6 (97.9)	36.8 (98.2)	38.5 (101.3)	38.0 (100.4)	32.5 (90.5)	30.5 (86.9)	29.4 (84.9)	29.5 (85.1)	35.5 (95.9)	35.6 (96.1)	33.0 (91.4)	38.5 (101.3)
Mean daily maximum °C (°F)	30.5 (86.9)	31.8 (89.2)	32.5 (90.5)	31.7 (89.1)	28.5 (83.3)	25.4 (77.7)	24.6 (76.3)	24.6 (76.3)	25.5 (77.9)	26.4 (79.5)	28.1 (82.6)	29.1 (84.4)	28.2 (82.8)
Mean daily minimum °C (°F)	14.2 (57.6)	15.5 (59.9)	16.5 (61.7)	16.3 (61.3)	15.8 (60.4)	15.3 (59.5)	14.7 (58.5)	14.6 (58.3)	14.7 (58.5)	14.8 (58.6)	14.9 (58.8)	14.3 (57.7)	15.1 (59.2)
Record low °C (°F)	8.1 (46.6)	8.2 (46.8)	9.0 (48.2)	5.0 (41.0)	6.0 (42.8)	10.0 (50.0)	9.0 (48.2)	8.0 (46.4)	7.0 (44.6)	7.5 (45.5)	9.0 (48.2)	6.7 (44.1)	5.0 (41.0)
Average rainfall mm (inches)	0 (0)	4 (0.2)	23 (0.9)	60 (2.4)	134 (5.3)	195 (7.7)	234 (9.2)	237 (9.3)	194 (7.6)	132 (5.2)	21 (0.8)	2 (0.1)	1,236 (48.7)
Average rainy days (≥ 0.1 mm)	0	0	2	5	12	13	20	21	19	15	3	0	110
Source 1: National Meteorology Agency
Source 2: World Meteorological Organisation (rainy days)

== Notable people ==
- Meaza Ashenafi (born 1964), lawyer and women's rights activist

== See also ==
- List of cities and towns in Ethiopia
