= Khojali al-Hassan =

Leader of Benishangul (early 20th century)

- Shaykh Khojali al-Hassan
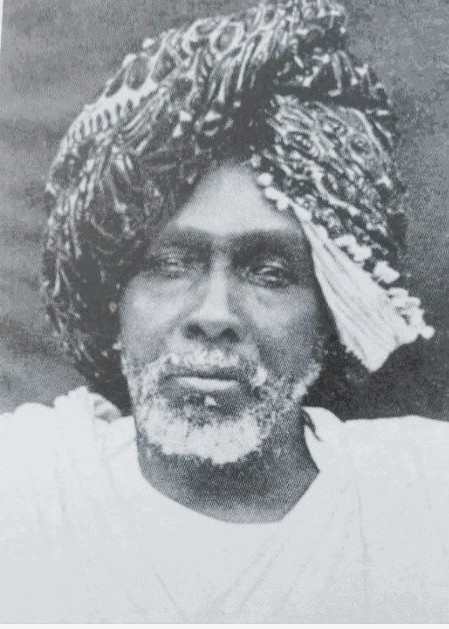

Ruler of the Benishangul
- Reign: bef. 1903 - aft. 1927
- Born: 1825; Benishangul, Assosa Sultanate
- Died: 1938 (aged 112–113); Galla-Sidamo, Italian East Africa
- Dynasty: Benishangul Sheikhdom
- Religion: Islam

Khojali al-Hassan (fl. 1927), was the Shaykh of Benishangul in Wallagi in the first half of the 20th century. Initially a traditional local ruler in Sudan, he became an autonomous tributary ruler under the Empire of Ethiopia after 1903. He became internationally known as a major player in the slave trade between Ethiopia and Sudan, a trade that attracted attention from the League of Nations.

== Life ==
When emperor Menelik II of Ethiopia annexed territories lying between the 2nd and 14th-latitudes north and west of the White Nile in 1891, and took control after the battle of Adwa in 1896, four sheikhdoms were annexed, and three of four pledged loyalty to the Ethiopian invaders, among them being Khojali al-Hassan. Khojali was instrumental in the inauguration of the Bank of Abyssinia as well as building the Ethio-Djibouti Railways, by providing assistance with gold payments to the emperor.

In 1903, the traditional rulers of Bela Shangul, Assosa and Komosha were all taken to Ethiopian capital of Addis Ababa, where they were imprisoned for five years. In 1908 they were released with the status of balabbat, local tributary rulers with a large degree of political autonomy under the emperor. This autonomous state of affairs resulted in a flourishing slave trade between Ethiopia and Sudan, where slaves were captured and trafficked to supply the markets of both the Ethiopian highlands as well as Eastern Sudan, a trade in which Khojali al-Hassan became the most prominent slave merchant. He operated a parallel supplying slaves both to slavery in Sudan as well as to slavery in Ethiopia, sending slaves to be sold in Sudan via the branches of his trade operated by his wife and children in Sudan, and sent consignment of slaves regularly to Addis Ababa in Ethiopia.

During the Temporary Slavery Commission (1923–1925) of the League of Nations, a flourishing slave trade was discovered between Sudan and Ethiopia: slave raids were conducted from Ethiopia to the Funj and White Nile provinces in South Sudan, capturing Berta, Gumuz and Burun non-Muslims, who were bought from Ethiopian slave traders by Arab Sudanese Muslims in Sudan or across the border in the independent Empire of Ethiopia, and Khojali al-Hassan played a major role in this slave trade.

His principal wife, Sitt Amna, had been acknowledged by the British as the head of an administrative unit in Sudan in 1905, where she had settled with her retinue. From her base in Sudan, she acted as the Sudanese agent of her husband's slave trade. Khojali al-Hassan collected slaves – normally adolescent girls and boys or children – by kidnapping, debt servitude or as tribute from his feudal subjects, and would send them across the border to his wife, who sold them to buyers in Sudan. In 1927, the slave trader Khojali al-Hassan, "Watawit" shaykh of Bela Shangul in Wallagi, was reported to have trafficked 13,000 slaves from Ethiopia to the Sudan via his wife Sitt Amna.

Khojali al-Hassan was assigned also by the Imperial family in Ethiopia as a slave trader, and a letter from Empress Menen contained an order for 600 slaves between seven and thirteen age to be delivered to the empress. The sale of 600 slaves to the empress reportedly took place in 1927; emperor Ras Tafari later claimed in his autobiography that the child slaves were in fact freed slaves, which were provided with manumission certificates and enrolled in military schools and given an education, but it was reported that Khojali regularly sent slaves to the emperor as tributes, and that the emperor did not free them and made no effort to return them to their parents.
