= Relief and Rehabilitation Commission =

The Relief and Rehabilitation Commission (RRC) is an Ethiopian government agency that was set up in Addis Ababa in the aftermath of the 1973 drought. It played a central role in bringing the 1984 - 1985 famine in Ethiopia to the public's attention, and helped to distribute international aid to the areas in need of help. The Commission continued to function during the Transitional Government of Ethiopia.

It was renamed in August 1995 as the Commission for Disaster Prevention and Preparedness.

== Links ==
The Challenges of Drought: Ethiopia’s Decade of Struggle in Relief and Rehabilitation - a 1985 publication of the RRC
