= Hanger River =

River in Ethiopia

Hanger River Anger, Angar
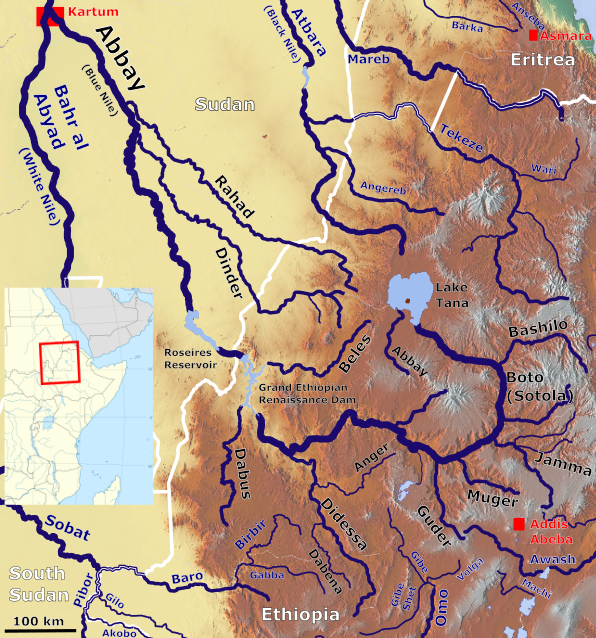
- Map of Abbay Basin, with the Hanger River near the bottom

Physical characteristics
- Mouth: Didessa River
  - coordinates: 9°35′N 36°2′E
- Basin size: 4,300 km^{2} (1,700 sq mi)

Basin features
- Progression: Didessa → Blue Nile → Nile → Mediterranean Sea
- River system: Nile Basin
- Tributaries
  - left: Wajja River

The Hanger (also transliterated Angar River) is a river in west central Ethiopia. It is a west-flowing tributary of the Didessa River, itself a tributary of the Blue Nile (also called the Abay River in Ethiopia). The Hanger enters the Didessa approximately halfway between the town of Nek'emte and the village of Cherari.

Tributaries of the Hanger include the Wajja, Alata, and Ukke rivers.

Portuguese missionary António Fernandes was the first European recorded to have seen the Hanger, crossing the river in 1613 as he sought a way south from Ethiopia to Malindi.

== See also ==
- List of Ethiopian rivers
