= Fadashi language =

Berta dialect of northwestern Ethiopia

Fadashi
- Native to: Ethiopia
- Region: Benishangul-Gumuz
- Native speakers: 3,450 Fadashi in Ethiopia (2007 census ?) unknown number in Sudan
- Language family: Nilo-Saharan?: Berta; Fadashi

Language codes
- ISO 639-3: wti-fad
- Glottolog: fada1248
- ELP: Fadashi

Fadashi is an erstwhile dialect of Berta that is distinct enough to be considered a separate language.
