= Ethiopian Road Transport Authority =

Public transport authority in Ethiopia

- የኢትዮጵያ መንገዶች ባለስልጣን
- Abbreviation: RTA
- Formation: 1967; 59 years ago
- Headquarters: Addis Ababa, Ethiopia
- Region served: Ethiopia
- Owner: Ethiopian government
- Leader: Tilahun Yimer
- Formerly called: Road Transport Administration

The Ethiopian Road Transport Authority (Amharic: የኢትዮጵያ መንገዶች ባለስልጣን, formerly called Road Transport Administration or RTA) is a public transport authority based in Addis Ababa, Ethiopia. It was founded as the Road Transport Administration in 1967 by Proclamation No 256/67.

== History ==
The Ethiopian Road Transport Authority was founded as the Road Transport Administration in 1967 by Proclamation No 256/67 but restructured and became the Road Transport Authority (RTA) in 1976, following proclamation No 107/76. The RTA states that its mission is "to ensure the provision of a modern, integrated and safe Road transport services to meet the needs of all the communities for strong and unitary economic and political system in Ethiopia." In doing so they attempt to promote an efficient road service, to coordinate and strengthen the road traffic safety and to develop the transport data base system to enhance research for the development of the sector.

In 2005, the Ethiopian government reorganized the transport sector and although the previously independent Urban Transport Authority, the Railway Regulatory Authority, the Aviation Authority, the Airport Administration Authority and the Maritime Regulatory Authority merged into the Ethiopian Transport Authority, the Road Transport Authority remained independent.
