= Didessa River =

River in western Ethiopia

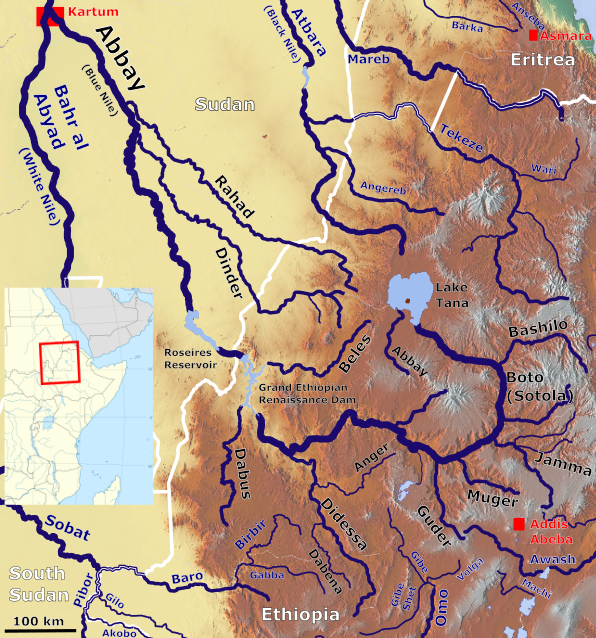
- Map showing the Abbay (Blue Nile) basin, with the Didessa River (Center bottom)

Location
- Country: Ethiopia

Physical characteristics
- Mouth: Blue Nile
  - coordinates: 9.942087°N 35.684299°E
  - elevation: 632 m (2,073 ft)
- Basin size: 25,800 km^{2} (10,000 sq mi)

Basin features
- Progression: Blue Nile → Nile → Mediterranean Sea
- River system: Nile Basin
- Tributaries
  - left: Dabena River
  - right: Hanger

The Didessa (pronounced: ɗeɗ:e:s:a; Oromo: Dhedheessa) is a river in western Ethiopia. A tributary of the Abay River, it rises in the mountains of Gomma, flowing in a northwesterly direction to its confluence where the course of the Abay has curved to its southernmost point before turning northwards. The Didessa's drainage area is about 25,800 km^{2} (10,000 sq mi), covering portions of the Benishangul-Gumuz Region and the West Welega Zone of the Oromia Region.

Tributaries on the right bank include the Enareya, Aet, Wama, and the Angar rivers; on the left side the most important tributary is the Dobana River. Exploring this river in the mid-1890s and from interviews with local inhabitants, Alexander Bulatovich asserted that downstream of its junction with the Angar, the Didessa is rapid-free and potentially navigable.

== Human history ==
The early 20th-century explorer Herbert Weld Blundell opined that "Didessa" appears to have replaced a much older name for this river, finding no earlier usage for it "before 1861, when d'Abbadie was travelling in Western Shoa and made inquiries." At the time of his visit, in 1905, the Handak forest on the right side of the Didessa was "famous as a favourite haunt for elephants. They seem to come up towards the Nile by both the Didesa and Dabus rivers, attracted, no doubt, in the latter river-bed by the rich growth of young bamboo." He also notes that at the confluence of the Didessa and the Abay, "the serious work of goldwashing begins, and continues along the Nile and down the course of the Dabus and its tributaries," adding that:

The deep erosion of the upper strata of basalt and trap, and subsequent decomposition, lays bare the gneissic and hornblendic schist formations below, so that nearly the whole country from the foot of Chochi to the river, a distance of 15 miles, is covered with quartz pebbles and boulders, and shows numerous outcrops. The decomposed portions of the reefs are strewn over the ground, and the gold they contain is thus washed into the small streams, and then carried into the Abai.

Despite the efforts of these explorers, and the presence of humans in the area since roughly the origins of the species, the course of the Didessa from its point near Nekemte to its confluence with the Abay apparently was only traced in 1935 by Dunlop and Taylor. They were told by Dejazmach Habte Maryam, the local official in Nekemte, "that nobody, even the local Shankallas, as far as he knew, had ever followed the course of the river to its junction with the Abbai."

Admittedly, at certain times of the year [the Dejazmach continued], a few Shankallas worked in some cotton fields, which he had just planted 15 miles north of the Dadessa bridge; but even these few miles were, to use his own words, "a country fit only for monkeys." He emphasized the difficulties which we would encounter: no paths, thick bamboo forests, fever, and, with an expressive upward wave of his hand, the steepness of the mountains bordering the river. He suggested that, if we were anxious to see the confluence of the Abbai and Dadessa, we would be well advised to follow the track from Nekemti to Nejo, thence along a known track to the junction.

== Anger Irrigation Dam ==
On 14 June 2021, the construction of the Anger Irrigation Dam at Didessa River was launched by the President of Oromia regional state, Shimelis Abdisa, and Minister of Water, Irrigation and Energy, Sileshi Bekele, to be completed in three years.

== See also ==
- Didessa Wildlife Sanctuary
