= Juan Maria Schuver =

Dutch explorer (1852–1883)

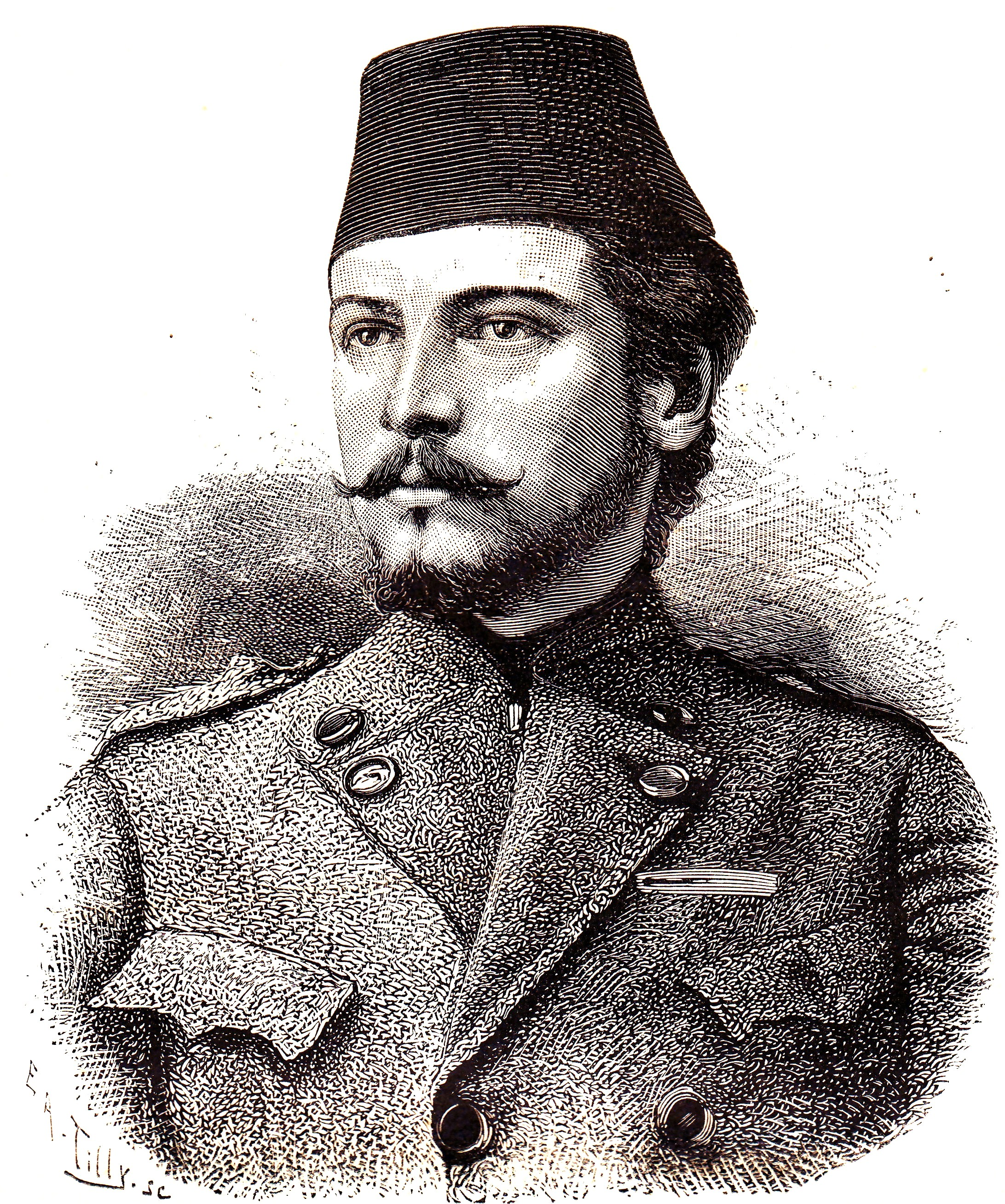
Juan Maria Schuver

Juan Maria Schuver (born Joannes Maria Schuver; 26 February 1852 – August 1883) was a Dutch explorer.

The son of a wealthy merchant, as a young man Schuver travelled extensively throughout Europe, the Middle East and northern Africa. At the age of 21 he worked as a private correspondent for the Dutch newspaper Algemeen Handelsblad, covering events that took place in the Third Carlist War in Spain. Afterwards he travelled to the Balkans and reported for the Handelsblad involving action from the Russo-Turkish War of 1877–1878. In 1879 his father died and Schuver inherited a fortune. At this time he made plans to pursue a lifelong dream, to undertake a scientific expedition to the interior of Africa. He joined the Royal Geographical Society of London and took classes on various subjects in order to prepare for his upcoming journey.

In March 1881, he reached Khartoum with a small entourage, and subsequently spent the better part of the next two-plus years performing explorations of southeastern Sudan, particularly the eastern watershed of the White Nile and the hill regions surrounding the upper Blue Nile. In southern Sudan, he had a keen interest in the political and social aspects of the area, and made important historical and ethnographic observations concerning the various tribes he encountered. His detailed descriptions of the Sudanese-Ethiopian border region in the early 1880s constitute an extremely valuable and exciting new contribution to the travel literature of late nineteenth-century Africa. In August 1883, he was fatally wounded by a spear during a skirmish with Dinka tribesmen in Tek, a village that was a two-day journey from the garrison at Meshra-el-Rek.

Schuver maintained extensive notebooks during the expedition, and items he collected during his stay in Sudan are now housed at the National Museum of Ethnology in Leiden.
