= Kamashi Zone =

Zone in the Benishangul-Gumuz of Ethiopia

Coordinates: 9°45′N 35°50′E

Map of the regions and zones of Ethiopia

Kamashi is a zone in the Benishangul-Gumuz Region of Ethiopia. It covers part of the southern bank of the Abay and the valley of the Didessa Rivers. The Zone is bordered on the south and east by the Oromia Region, on the west by the Asosa and Sudan, and on the north by Metekel and the Amhara Region, which lie on the further bank of the Abay. The majority ethnic group in the zone is the Gumuz people, with significant Oromo and Amhara minorities as well.

Rivers in Kamashi include the Didessa.

== Demographics ==
Based on the 2007 Census conducted by the Central Statistical Agency of Ethiopia (CSA), this Zone has a total population of 101,543, of whom 52,284 are men and 49,259 women. 14,894 or 14.67% of population are urban inhabitants. A total of 21,404 households were counted in this Zone, which results in an average of 4.74 persons to a household, and 20,698 housing units. The four largest ethnic groups reported in the Kamashi Zone were the Gumuz (60.56%), the Oromo (24.61%), the Amhara (11.11%), and the Berta (2.83%); all other ethnic groups made up 0.89% of the population. Main languages are the Gumuz (59.67%), Oromo (25.54%), Amharic (11.25%), and the Berta (2.8%). The majority of the inhabitants were Protestant, with 56.24% of the population reporting that they held that belief, while 28.87% practiced Ethiopian Orthodox Christianity, 6.87% were Muslim, 6.06% practiced traditional beliefs, and 1.35% were Catholic.

Based on figures from the Central Statistical Agency in 2005, this zone has an estimated total population of 67,361, of whom 34,150 are men and 33,211 are women. With an estimated area of 8,850.96 square kilometers, Kamashi has an estimated population density of 7.61 people per square kilometer. Information is lacking on the towns of this zone.

The 1994 national census reported a total population for this Zone of 50,783 in 9,963 households, of whom 25,862 were men and 24,921 were women. The three largest ethnic groups reported in the Kamashi Zone were the Gumuz (76.1%), the Oromo (18.6%), and the Berta (4.5%); all other ethnic groups made up 0.8% of the population. Gumuz is spoken by 76% of the population, Oromiffa as a first language by 18.6% and as a second language by 48.3%, and Berta by 4.5%; the remaining 0.9% spoke all other primary languages reported. While 46.7% speak only one language, Oromiffo is spoken as a second language by 48.3%, Gumuz by 3.9% and Amharic by 1.8%. Most of the inhabitants followed traditional beliefs, with 43.6% of the population reporting beliefs reported under that category, while 27% were Protestant, 26% Ethiopian Orthodox Christianity, and 5.8% were Muslim. Concerning education, 11.36% of the population were considered literate; 9.02% of children aged 7-12 were in primary school, a negligible number of the children aged 13-14 were in junior secondary school, and only 0.08% of the inhabitants aged 15–18 in senior secondary school. 3.6% of all houses had access to safe drinking water, and 2.4% had toilet facilities at the time of the census.

According to a 24 May 2004 World Bank memorandum, none of the inhabitants of Kamashi have access to electricity, this zone has a road density of 21.2 kilometers per 1000 square kilometers, the average rural household has 1.2 hectare of land (compared to the national average of 1.01 hectare of land and an average of 2.25 for pastoral Regions) and the equivalent of 0.3 heads of livestock. 15.4% of the population is in non-farm related jobs, compared to the national average of 25% and an average of 28% for pastoral Regions. 84% of the zone is exposed to malaria, and 100% to Tsetse fly. The memorandum gave this zone a drought risk rating of 387.
