= Asosa Zone =

Zone in Benishangul-Gumuz Region of Ethiopia

Coordinates: 10°20′N 34°40′E

Map of the regions and zones of Ethiopia

Assosa is a zone in Benishangul-Gumuz Region of Ethiopia. This Zone was named after the Assosa Sultanate, which had approximately the same boundaries. Assosa is bordered on the south by the Mao-Komo special woreda, on the west by Sudan, and on the northeast by the Kamashi. The largest town in this zone is Assosa. Its highest point is Mount Bambashi, located in the woreda of the same name. The majority ethnic group in the zone is the Berta people.

The area Assosa occupies came under Ethiopian control in 1898, when Emperor Menelik II skillfully exploited the traditional rivalry of the three local rulers, Sheikh Ejail al-Hassan of Assosa, Sheikh Mahmud of Khomosha and Sheikh Abd al-Rahman Al-Ejail of Bela-Shangul proper. When Ethiopia and the British administration of Sudan demarcated their common border in 1902, this finalized their annexation.

== Demographics ==
Based on the 2007 Census conducted by the Central Statistical Agency of Ethiopia (CSA), this Zone has a total population of 310,822, of whom 158,932 are men and 151,890 women. 39,957 or 12.86% of population are urban inhabitants. A total of 72,879 households were counted in this Zone, which results in an average of 4.27 persons to a household, and 69,378 housing units. The four largest ethnic groups reported in the Assosa Zone were the Berta (59.95%), the Amhara (23.86%), the Oromo (10.31%), and the Tigrayans (1.5%), 1.48% of the population was from Sudan; all other ethnic groups made up 2.9% of the population. Main languages are the Berta (59.31%), Amharic (25.7%), Oromo (10.68%), and Tigrinya (1.07%). The majority of the inhabitants were Muslim, with 74.08% of the population reporting that they held that belief, while 16.51% practiced Ethiopian Orthodox Christianity, and 8.57% were Protestant.

Based on figures from the Central Statistical Agency in 2005, this zone has an estimated total population of 282,596, of whom 143,544 are men and 139,052 are women; 28,264 or 10% of its population are urban dwellers. With an estimated area of 14,166.12 square kilometers, Assosa has an estimated population density of 19.95 people per square kilometer.

The 1994 national census reported a total population for this Zone of 208,155 in 47,755 households, of whom 106,017 were men and 102,138 were women; 16,420 or 7.89% of its population were urban dwellers. The five largest ethnic groups reported in the Assosa Zone were the Berta (54%), the Amhara (26%), the Oromo (11%), the Tigrayans (1.5%), and the Mao (1.3%). Berta was spoken by 53.6%, Amharic is spoken as a first language by 26.7% and as a second language by another 6.2%, Oromiffa by 11.3% and as a second language by another 5.5%, Fadashi by 4.2%, and Tigrinya by 1.4%. The majority of the inhabitants were Muslim, with 78% of the population reporting they professed that religion, while 18.7% practiced Ethiopian Orthodox Christianity, and 2.7% were Protestant.

According to a May 24, 2004 World Bank memorandum, 9% of the inhabitants of Assosa have access to electricity, this zone has a road density of 35.6 kilometers per 1000 square kilometers, the average rural household has 1 hectare of land (compared to the national average of 1.01 hectare of land and an average of 2.25 for pastoral Regions) and the equivalent of 0.4 heads of livestock. 17.1% of the population is in non-farm related jobs, compared to the national average of 25% and a regional average of 28%. 72% of all eligible children are enrolled in primary school, and 13% in secondary schools. 34% of the zone is exposed to malaria, and 58% to Tsetse fly. The memorandum gave this zone a drought risk rating of 324.
