= Berta people =

Ethnic group in Ethiopia and Sudan

Berta
Regions with significant populations
- Ethiopia: 208,759; Sudan: 180,000

Languages
- Berta

Religion
- Islam

Related ethnic groups
- Gumuz, Uduk

The Berta or Bertha, also known as the Benishangul, Bela Shangul, Shangul or Funj, are an ethnic group living along the border of Sudan and Benishangul-Gumuz Region of Ethiopia. They speak a Nilo-Saharan language that is not related to those of their Nilo-Saharan neighbors (Gumuz, Uduk). The total population of Ethiopian-Bertas in Ethiopia is 208,759 people. Sudanese-Bertas number around 180,000.

== History ==
Their origins are to be found in Sennar in eastern Sudan, in the area of the former Funj sultanate (1521-1804). In Sudan, they are often referred to as Funj, and are described by Sudanese historian Awn ash-Sharif Gasim as the largest Funj tribe. During the 16th or 17th century, they migrated to western Ethiopia, in the area of the modern Benishangul-Gumuz Region. "Benishangul" is an Arabicized form of the original name Bela Shangul, meaning "Rock of Shangul". This refers to a sacred stone located in a mountain in the Menge woreda, one of the places where the Berta originally settled when they arrived to Ethiopia.

Their arrival in Ethiopia was marked by strong territorial conflict among the diverse Shangul communities. For this reason, and for protecting themselves from slave raids coming from Sudan, the Shangul communities decided to establish their villages in naturally-defended hills and mountains, amidst rocky outcrops. Due to this harsh topography, houses and granaries were raised over stone pillars. German traveler Ernst Marno described Shangul architecture and villages in his Reisen im Gebiete des Blauen und Weissen Nil (Vienna, 1874). The Shangul of Benishangul were incorporated into Ethiopia only in 1896.

During the 19th century, the area of Benishangul was divided in several sheikhdoms (Fadasi, Komosha, Gizen, Asosa), the most powerful of which was ruled by Sheikh Khoyele at the end of the 19th century. After conflicts and raids receded during the 20th century, the Shangul people moved to the valleys, where their villages are located today. The leader of Benishangul of Ethiopia in the early 20th century was Khojali al-Hassan.

== Customs ==
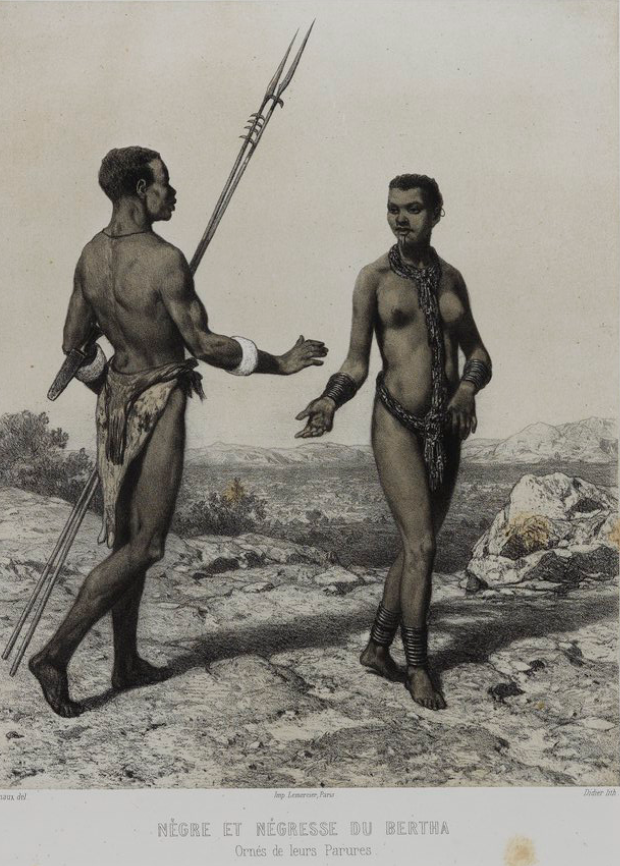
Two Berta in the mid-19th century

After several centuries of influence by the Arabic-speaking regions of Sudan, the Berta are now mostly Muslim and many speak fluent Sudanese Arabic. Due to their intermarriage with Arab traders, some Berta were called Watawit -the local name for "bat", meaning that they were a mix of two very different groups. However, they still have traditional customs that are similar to those of their Nilo-Saharan neighbors. For example, there still exist ritual specialists called neri, who have healing and divination powers. They are the ones who know how to deal with evil spirits (shuman). Rain-making rituals are also found among the Berta, as among other Nilo-Saharan and Nilotic communities.

In their wedding ceremonies, music is played by males with large calabash trumpets (waz'a). The groom arrives to the wedding on a donkey and carrying a bang (throwing stick) in his hand. After the wedding, the husband has to build a hut and live in his wife's village for a year or more, tilling his father-in-law's land. Divorce is accepted. The Berta practice scarification, usually three vertical lines on each cheek, which they consider to be symbols of God (each line is interpreted as the initial letter of Allah, the Arabic alif).

Most Berta are mixed farmers also involved in raising livestock, trading, beekeeping, and coffee cultivation. Their staple food is sorghum, with which they make porridge in ceramic vessels. They also make beer with sorghum. Beer is prepared in large ceramic containers called awar and is'u. Working parties play an important role in Berta society. When somebody wants to build a house or cultivate a field, he calls his neighbors for help and provides beer and food.

Most Berta practice Islam, often including traditional customs.

== See also ==
- Berta language
- Berta languages
- Funj people

== Bibliography ==
- Andersen, T. 1993. "Aspects of Berta phonology". Afrika und Übersee 76: 41–80.
- Andersen, T. 1995. "Absolutive and Nominative in Berta". In Nicolai & Rottland (eds.): Fifth Nilo-Saharan Linguistics Colloquium. Nice, 24–29 August 1992. Proceedings. (Nilo-Saharan 10). Cologne: Köppe, pp. 36–49.
- Bender, L. 1989. "Berta Lexicon". In L. Bender (ed.): Topics in Nilo-Saharan Linguistics (Nilo-Saharan 3). Hamburg: Helmut Buske, pp. 271–304.
- González-Ruibal, A. 2006. Order in a disordered world: the Bertha house (Western Ethiopia). Anthropos 101(2): 379–402.
- Triulzi, Alessandro. 1981. Salt, gold and legitimacy. Prelude to the history of a no man’s land. Bela Shangul, Wallagga, Ethiopia (ca. 1800-1898). Naples: Istituto di Studi Orientale.
