= Berta language =

Nilo-Saharan language spoken by the Berta in Sudan and Ethiopia

Berta
- Gebeto
- Native to: Sudan and Ethiopia
- Region: Benishangul-Gumuz
- Ethnicity: Berta people, Wetawit
- Native speakers: 380,000 all Berta languages (2006–2007); 100,000 monolinguals in Ethiopia
- Language family: Nilo-Saharan?: Berta languages; Berta
- Dialects: Shuru; Bake; Undu; Mayu; Fadashi; Dabuso; Beleje Gonfoye
- Writing system: Latin

Language codes
- ISO 639-3: wti (all Berta languages)
- Glottolog: bert1248

Berta, also known as Gebeto, is a Berta language spoken by the Berta people (also Bertha, Barta, Burta) in Sudan and Ethiopia. As of 2006, Berta had approximately 180,000 speakers in Sudan. The three Berta languages — Gebeto, Fadashi and Undu — are often considered dialects of a single language. Berta proper includes the dialects Bake, Dabuso, Gebeto, Mayu, and Shuru; the dialect name Gebeto may be extended to all of Berta proper.

== Phonology ==
=== Consonants ===
		Labial	Dental	Alveolar	Palatal	Velar	Glottal
Stop	voiced	b		d	ɟ	g	
Stop	ejective	pʼ		tʼ	(cʼ)	kʼ	(ʔ)
Stop	implosive			ɗ			
Fricative	voiceless	f	θ	s	ʃ		h
Fricative	ejective			sʼ			
Nasal		m		n	(ɲ)	ŋ	
Rhotic				r			
Lateral				l			
Approximant					j	w	

- Voiced plosives /b, d, ɡ/ may be heard as voiceless [p, t, k] in free variation, word-initially or word-finally.
- A glottal stop [ʔ] mainly occurs between vowels, and may also be heard before word-initial vowel sounds.
- Nasal-stop sequences may occur morpheme-initially as [mb, nd, ŋɡ, ŋkʼ].
- /ŋ/ is heard as [ɲ] when preceding a front vowel /i/ or /e/.
- /kʼ/ is heard as a palatal [cʼ] when before front vowels.
- /ɡ/ can be heard as voiced palatal [ɟ] or as a voiceless palatal [c] when before front vowels.
- /h/ in word-final position can be heard as a fricative [x].
- /s, θ/ may sometimes occur as slightly voiced [z, ð] in vocalic or nasal environments.

=== Vowels ===
	Front	Central	Back
Close	i iː		u uː
Mid	ɛ ɛː		ɔ ɔː
Open		a aː	

- If a non-closed vowel sound, /ɛ/ or /ɔ/, are adjacent to a closed vowel sound like /i/ or /u/ within vowel harmony, they are then heard as more closed [e, o].

Phoneme	Allophone
/i/	[i], [ɨ~ɘ], [ɨ], [ɪ]
/a/	[a], [ə], [æ], [ɜ], [ɐ]
/u/	[u], [ʉ], [ʊ]

== Pronouns ==
The pronouns of Berta are as follows:

	Topic	Postverbal subject	Postverbal object
I	àl(ì)	-lɪ́ɪ̀	-ɟì
you (sg.)	(à)ŋɡó	-ŋó	-ŋɡó
he, she, it	ɲìnè	-né	ɲìnè, -né
we	χàtâŋ	-ŋàa	χàtâŋ
you (pl.)	χàtú	χátú	χàtú
they	mèrée	mérée	mèrée

== Syntax ==
The standard Berta word order for a sentence is as follows, below. In other words, Berta is a VSO language, and Berta syntactic structure is generally head-initial.

(Topic) Verb (Subject) (Indirect Object) (Direct Object) (Adverbial)

== See also ==
- Berta word lists (Wiktionary)

== Bibliography ==
- Torben Andersen. "Aspects of Berta phonology". Afrika und Übersee 76: pp. 41–80.
- Torben Andersen. "Absolutive and Nominative in Berta". ed. Nicolai & Rottland, Fifth Nilo-Saharan Linguistics Colloquium. Nice, 24–29 August 1992. Proceedings. (Nilo-Saharan 10). Köln: Rüdiger Köppe Verlag. 1995. pp. 36–49.
- M. Lionel Bender. "Berta Lexicon". In Bender (ed.), Topics in Nilo-Saharan Linguistics (Nilo-Saharan 3), pp. 271–304. Hamburg: Helmut Buske Verlag 1989.
- E. Cerulli. "Three Berta dialects in western Ethiopia", Africa, 1947.
- Susanne Neudorf & Andreas Neudorf: Bertha - English - Amharic Dictionary. Addis Ababa: Benishangul-Gumuz Language Development Project 2007.
- A. N. Tucker & M. A. Bryan. Linguistic Analyses: The Non-Bantu Languages of North-Eastern Africa. London: Oxford University Press 1966.
- A. Triulzi, A. A. Dafallah, and M. L. Bender. "Berta". In Bender (ed.), The Non-Semitic Languages of Ethiopia. East Lansing, Michigan: African Studies Center, Michigan State University 1976, pp. 513–532.
- Andersen, Torben (2023). "Berta". In Ronny Meyer; Zelealem Leyew; Bedilu Wakjira (eds.). Oxford Handbook of Ethiopian Languages. Oxford: Oxford University Press. pp. 688–712.
