= Benishangul-Gumuz Region =

Regional state in northwestern Ethiopia

Coordinates: 10°46′N 35°32′E

Benishangul-Gumuz Region ቤኒሻንጉል ጉሙዝ
- Regional state
- Flag Seal

- Map of Ethiopia showing the Benishangul-Gumuz Region
- Country: Ethiopia
- Established: 1995
- Capital: Assosa

Government
  - Chief Administrator: Ashadli Hassan

Area
  - Total: 50,699 km^{2} (19,575 sq mi)
  - Rank: 7th

Population (2025)
  - Total: 1,096,000
  - Rank: 9th
  - Density: 21.62/km^{2} (55.99/sq mi)
- ISO 3166 code: ET-BE
- HDI (2019): 0.476 low · 7th of 11

Benishangul-Gumuz (Amharic: ቤኒሻንጉል ጉሙዝ, romanized: Bēnīshaniguli Gumuzi) is a regional state in northwestern Ethiopia bordering Sudan. It was previously known as Region 6. The region's capital is Assosa. Following the adoption of the 1995 constitution, the region was created from the westernmost portion of the Gojjam province (the part north of the Abay River), and the northwestern portion of the Welega Province (the part south of the Abay). The name of the region comes from two peoples – Berta (also called Benishangul, which is its original name) and Gumuz.

The region has faced major challenges to economic development, due to lack of transportation and communications infrastructure. The Abay River (Blue Nile) divides Benishangul-Gumuz, and there was no bridge crossing it until 2012. The major road that connects the Metekel Zone and the Assosa Zone was built by the China Construction Company in 2012. The road has a 365-meter bridge that crosses the Abay. Nowadays it is simple to travel between the regional capital of Assosa and Gilgil Beles, the capital of the Metekel Zone. Previously one had to travel through Wollega and Gojjam in the neighboring regions of Oromia and Amhara, a distance of 1,250 kilometers, but it is now around 378 kilometers on the new road and bridge. Conditions for travel within zones varies, but is often poor and subject to disruption by the rainy season. On 28 July 2009, the Regional Rural Roads Authority reported that over the previous year almost 600 of the 800 kilometers of local all-weather roads had been upgraded at a cost of 11.5 million Birr, and an additional 447 kilometers of roads constructed.

== Demographics ==
Based on the 2007 Census conducted by the Central Statistical Agency of Ethiopia (CSA), the Benishangul-Gumuz Region has a total population of 784,345, consisting of 398,655 men and 385,690 women; urban inhabitants number 105,926 or 13.51% of the population. With an estimated area of 49,289.46 square kilometers, this Region has an estimated density of 15.91 people per square kilometer. For the entire region 174,445 households were counted, which results in an average for the Region of 4.5 persons to a household, with urban households having on average 3.6 and rural households 4.7 people. The ethnic groups include the Berta (25.41%), Amhara (21.69%), Gumuz (20.88%), Oromo (13.55%), Shinasha (7.73%) and Agaw-Awi (4.22%). Main languages are the before;Berta (25.15%), Amharic (22.46%), Gumuz (20.59%), Oromo (17.69%), Shinasha (4.58%) and Awngi (4.01%). Concerning religion, 44.98% of the population were Muslim, 33.3% were Orthodox Christians, 13.53% were Protestant, and 7.09% practiced traditional beliefs. It had a projected population of 1,127,001 in 2018.

In the previous census, conducted in 1994, the region's population was reported to be 460,459 of which 233,013 were men and 227,446 were women. Rural population was 424,432, while the urban population was 36,027. The five largest ethnic groups in Benishangul-Gumuz were the Berta (27%), Gumuz (23%), Amhara (22%), Oromo (13%) and Shinasha (7%). Berta is spoken in the Sherkole woreda, Gumuz is spoken along the western boundary of Guba and Dangur woredas and in the Sirba Abbay woreda, and the Shinasha are a displaced people of Kaffa scattered across Welega and Gojjam. The Berta and Gumuz tend to have more in common with the people of neighbouring Sudan than with other Ethiopian peoples, while the Amhara and Tigrayans, who are known as Habesha (or "highlanders") are recent arrivals, who began to settle in the region during the Derg era. According to the 1994 census 44.1% of inhabitants were Muslim, 34.8% Orthodox Christians, 13.1% followers of traditional religions and 5.8% Protestants.

According to the CSA, as of 2004, 27.23% of the total population had access to safe drinking water, of whom 22.35% were rural inhabitants and 58.53% were urban. Values for other reported common indicators of the standard of living for Benishangul-Gumuz as of 2005 include the following: 19.1% of the inhabitants fall into the lowest wealth quintile; adult literacy for men is 47.4% and for women 23.2%; and the regional infant mortality rate is 84 infant deaths per 1,000 live births, which is greater than the nationwide average of 77; at least half of these deaths occurred in the infants’ first month of life.

There are 2 refugee camps and 1 transit center, housing 36,440 refugees from Sudan and South Sudan, located in Benishangul-Gumuz region.

=== Religion ===
Religion in Benishangul-Gumuz Region (2007)
1. Christianity (Ethiopian Orthodox 33.4%, P'ent'ay 13.5% and Catholics 0.6%) (47.5%)
2. Muslim (44.9%)
3. Traditional faiths (7.10%)
4. Other (0.50%)

=== Ethnic groups ===
Some of the ethnic groups native to the Benishangul-Gumuz region are:

- Berta, mostly in Assosa Zone
- Gumuz, mostly in Kamashi Zone, also form the plurality in Metekel Zone
- Kwama, mostly in Mao-Komo special woreda
- Shinasha, mostly in Metekel Zone
- Amhara people, mostly in Metekel Zone
- Agew people, mostly in Metekel Zone
- Mao, mostly in Mao-Komo special woreda
- Bambashi, mostly in Bambasi (woreda)

Five of these ethnic groups (Benishangul, Gumuz, Shinasha, Mao and Kwama) are granted the exclusive right to non-territorially functioning indigenous councils.

== History ==
Like the Gambela Region, Benishangul-Gumuz is historically closely linked to neighbouring areas of Sudan, and to a lesser extent to the Ethiopian Highlands. These regions served as slave-hunting grounds since Aksumite times, and their Nilosaharan-speaking inhabitants were pejoratively called Shanqella (Šanqəlla, also Shanqila, Shankella) by the highland Ethiopians. Besides slaves, gold was traditionally an important export of Benishangul.

Little is known about its history before the 19th century. Archaeologists have found sites that they date to the end of the 1st millennium BC or the beginning of the 1st millennium AD and assign them to the forerunners of today's Komuz-speaking ethnic groups. Finds attributing them to the Berta date from the 17th to 20th centuries and are mainly located on mountains, hills and in rocky areas that are easy to defend. It was not until the mid-20th century that Berta also settled in the lowlands, as slave hunts and armed conflict had ended.

The area lay as a "buffer zone" or "no man's land" between southern Sennar and Damot in the highlands. The Ethiopian Emperor Susenyos invaded the area in 1617/18, and it fell to the Funj Sultanate in 1685.

According to Negasso Gidada, Oromo penetration into the region began in the mid-18th century.

In the first quarter of the 19th century, Arab traders arrived from Sennar, which was occupied by Ottoman Egypt from 1821. These traders married into the Berta upper class and thus gained political influence. By the middle of the century, the waṭāwiṭ, the descendants of Arabs and Berta, had become the new ruling class. They also began to spread Islam among the Berta. Various trade routes met in Benishangul, and local gold and Ethiopian amole (salt bars) were exchanged for slaves, cattle, horses, iron, civet, musk, coffee, ivory and honey (which also came from the Oromo areas of Sibu and Leeqaa). Luxury goods such as textiles and glass beads were imported via Sudan.

Later in the 19th century, Benishangul was affected by the Mahdi uprising. In the late 19th century, Ethiopia, under Menelik II, annexed the Sultanates of Beni Shangul and Gubba (Qubba in Arabic) at the behest of Abdallahi ibn Muhammad of Sudan who feared the British would occupy it. The southwards expansion of Emperor Menelik directed against Oromo, Kafa, and peoples further south, was also perceived as a campaign of submission of the Shanqella. This also included the Sheikhdom, a successor to the previously tributary Funj Sultanate. In 1898, Asosa became the political and economic capital. Until the Italian occupation of Ethiopia in the mid-1930s, the area supplied gold and slaves to the central government on a large scale. Slaves were also smuggled into Sudan across the border, which was established in 1902. The leader of Benishangul in the early 20th century was Khojali al-Hassan.

It was reported that Benishangul region continued to provide Ethiopia with Gold in the early 1970s. Under the regime of Mengistu Haile Mariam, who ruled Ethiopia from 1974, some 250,000 drought and famine-stricken peasants from the highlands—mostly Amharas from Wollo province—were relocated to Benishangul-Gumuz from 1979 and especially in the mid-1980s.

Resistance to the Mengistu regime here came mainly from the Berta. In addition, the Oromo Liberation Front (OLF) - supported by the Eritrean People's Liberation Front, which in the meantime had advanced far south from Eritrea - also fought for the area in the Ethiopian civil war in the late 1980s and early 1990s. The OLF tried to incorporate the local population as "black Oromo", but met with little support. The Berta rebels instead allied with the Tigray People's Liberation Front (TPLF), which overthrew the Mengistu regime in 1991 with the coalition EPRDF. As the Berta People's Liberation Movement or Benishangul People's Liberation Movement (BPLM), they - like the Gambella People’s Liberation Movement of the Anuak in Gambella - were not accepted as full members of the EPRDF, but became regional partners of the new ruling coalition.

In 2019, the Metekel conflict began. In December 2019, about 200 people were killed in the Metekel massacre.

== Agriculture ==
The CSA of Ethiopia estimated in 2005 that farmers in Benishangul-Gumuz had a total of 307,820 head of cattle (representing 0.79% of Ethiopia's total cattle), 65,800 sheep (0.38%), 244,570 goats (1.88%), 1,770 mules (1.2%), 37,520 asses (1.5%), 732,270 poultry of all species (2.37%), and 166,130 beehives (3.82%).

Over 60% of this region is covered with forest, including bamboo, eucalyptus and rubber trees, incense and gum forests as well as the indigenous species. However, due to increased population which has led to the widespread destruction of the canopy, authorities announced a campaign on 8 June 2007 to plant 1.5 million seedlings over the next two months to replenish this resource.

== Chief Administrator of the Region ==
	Party	Time period
Attom Mustapha	BPLM	after 1991
Abdu Mohammad Ali	BPLM	1990s
Ateyb Ahmed	BPLM	1990s – 1995
Yaregal Aysheshum	B-GPDUF	July 1995 – November 2008
Ahmed Nasir Ahmed	B-GPDUF	November 2008 – May 2016
Ashadli Hasen	B-BGDP/PP	June 2016 – present

(This list is based on information from Worldstatesmen.org, John Young, and the Ethiopian News Agency website)

== Administrative zones ==
Like other regions in Ethiopia, Benishangul-Gumuz is subdivided into administrative zones.

- Assosa
- Kamashi
- Metekel

== Towns ==
There are 23 towns in the Benishangul-Gumuz Region

Town	Population 2007	Zone/Special Woreda
Adis Alem	4,208	Pawe
Alimu	3,272	Pawe
Asosa	24,214	Asosa
Bamibasi	9,146	Asosa
Bilidigilu	3,165	Asosa
Bulen	6,531	Metekel
Debire Zeyit	5,476	Metekel
Dibate	7,399	Metekel
Felege Selam	2,588	Pawe
Gelgel Beles	2,962	Metekel
Genete Mariam	4,556	Metekel
Homosha	875	Asosa
Hore Azahab	553	Asosa
Kamishi	5,917	Kamashi
Koncho	2,725	Kamashi
Manibuk	8,352	Metekel
Mankush	2,339	Metekel
Menge	1,101	Asosa
Meti	2,073	Kamashi
Sherkole	903	Asosa
Soge	2,762	Kamashi
Tongo	3,392	Mao Komo
Yaso	1,417	Kamashi

== See also ==
- List of districts in the Benishangul-Gumuz region
- Grand Ethiopian Renaissance Dam
