= Guba (woreda) =

Coordinates: 11°20′N 35°15′E

Guba is one of the 20 woredas in the Benishangul-Gumuz Region of Ethiopia. It is named after the former Sultanate of Gubba. Part of the Metekel Zone, Guba is bordered by the Abay River on the south which separates it from the Kamashi Zone, Sudan on the west, Amhara Region on the north, Dangur on the east, and on the southeast by the Beles River, which separates it from Wenbera. Towns in Guba include Mankush. A refugee camp for displaced persons from Sudan operated in this woreda at Yarenja until all of its inhabitants were repatriated and the camp closed 28 March 2007.

== Demographics ==
The 2007 national census reported a total population for this woreda of 14,907, of whom 7,484 were men and 7,423 were women; 2,339 or 15.69% of its population were urban dwellers. The majority of the inhabitants were Moslem, with 87.25% of the population reporting they observed this belief, while 12.54% of the population said they practised Ethiopian Orthodox Christianity.

Based on figures from the Central Statistical Agency in 2005, this woreda has an estimated total population of 10,851, of whom 5,305 are men and 5,546 are women; 1,255 or 11.57% of the population are urban dwellers which is greater than the Zone average of 10.7%. With an estimated area of 3,896.10 square kilometers, Guba has a population density of 2.8 people per square kilometer which is less than the Zone average of 8.57.

The 1994 national census reported a total population for this woreda of 7,962 in 2193 households, of whom 3,899 were men and 4,063 were women; 729 or 9.16% of its population were urban. The four largest ethnic groups reported in Guba were the Gumuz (66.5%), the Shinasha (24.9%), the Amhara (6.6%), the Awi (1%) a subgroup of the Agaw, and the Tigrayans (1%). Gumuz is spoken as a first language by 65.1%, while 25.7% speak Boro, 7.2% speak Amharic, 1% speak Awngi, and 1% speak Tigrinya. The majority of the inhabitants were Muslim, with 88.9% of the population reporting that they held that belief, while 7% practiced Ethiopian Orthodox Christianity. Concerning education, 9.5% of the population were considered literate, which is less than the Zone average of 18.61%; 5.67% of children aged 7–12 were in primary school; a negligible number of the children aged 13–14 were in junior secondary school; and a negligible number of the inhabitants aged 15–18 were in senior secondary school. Concerning sanitary conditions, 98% of the urban houses and 9.2% of all houses had access to safe drinking water at the time of the census; 33.3% of the urban and 3.8% of the total had toilet facilities.
