= Bulen (woreda) =

Coordinates: 10°32′42″N 35°58′30″E

Bullen is one of the 20 Districts of Ethiopia, or woredas, in the Benishangul-Gumuz Region of Ethiopia. It is named after its highest point, Mount Bullen. Part of the Metekel Zone, Bullen is bordered by Dangur in the north, Mandura in the northeast, Dibate in the east, the Abay River on the south (which separates it from the Kamashi Zone), and by Wenbera in the west. Its largest settlement is Bullen.

== Demographics ==
The 2007 national census reported a total population for this woreda of 45,523, of whom 23,386 were men and 22,137 were women; 6,531 or 14.35% of its population were urban dwellers. The majority of the inhabitants said they practised Ethiopian Orthodox Christianity, with 67.37% of the population reporting they observed this belief, while 10.16% of the population were Protestant, 12.68% practiced traditional beliefs, and 9.68% were Moslem.

Based on figures from the Central Statistical Agency in 2005, this woreda has an estimated total population of 29,288, of whom 14,654 are men and 14,634 are women; 5,615 or 19.2% of the population are urban dwellers, which is greater than the Zone average of 10.7%. With an estimated area of 2,857.97 square kilometers, Bulen has a population density of 10.2 people per square kilometer which is greater than the Zone average of 8.57.

The 1994 national census reported a total population for this woreda of 21,111 in 4,295 households, of whom 10,624 were men and 10,487 were women; 3,264 or 15.46% of its population were urban dwellers. The five largest ethnic groups reported in Bulen were the Shinasha (48%), the Gumuz (33.5%), the Amhara (9.8%), the Oromo (8%), and the Awi (0.5%) a subgroup of the Agaw; all other ethnic groups made up 0.2% of the population. Bori-nono is spoken as a first language by 45% of the inhabitants, 33.4% speak Gis-Gumuza, 11% Oromiffa, and 10% speak Amharic; the remaining 0.6% spoke all other primary languages reported. The majority of the inhabitants said they practiced [[Christianity [Orthodox and Protestant]], with 65% reporting that as their religion, while, 21.5% observed traditional religions, and 9.8% were Muslim. Concerning education, 15.1% of the population were considered literate, which is less than the Zone average of 18.61%; 9.38% of children aged 7–12 were in primary school; 0.1% of the children aged 13–14 were in junior secondary school; and 0.85% of the inhabitants aged 15–18 were in senior secondary school. Concerning sanitary conditions, 12.6% of the urban houses and 3.6% of all houses had access to safe drinking water at the time of the census; 41.2% of the urban and 9.8% of the total had toilet facilities.
