= Dibate (woreda) =

Coordinates: 10°30′N 36°10′E

Dibate is a woreda in the Benishangul-Gumuz Region of Ethiopia. Part of the Metekel Zone, it is bordered by Mandura on the north, by the Dura River on the east which separates it from the Amhara Region, by the Abay River on the south which separates it from Galesa woreda and the Kamashi Zone, and by Bulen on the west. This woreda is named for its largest town, Dibate; other settlements include Borebo.

== Overview ==
High points include the Danjiga mountains in the southern part of the woreda, which run along the Abay river as it turns to the south.

Originally Dibate and Mandura were subunits of Guangua woreda, which was part of the Metekel awraja; in the 1960s these two subunits were split off to form separate woredas in order to strengthen government control over the local Gumuz people. Remaining parts of Guangua was transferred to Amhara when that region was organized in the 1992.

== Demographics ==
The 2007 national census reported a total population for this woreda of 66,654, of whom 33,452 were men and 33,202 were women; 7,399 or 11.1% of its population were urban dwellers. The majority of the inhabitants said they practised [Protestant and Ethiopian Orthodox Christianity, with 45.84% of the population reporting they observed this belief, while 14.88% of the population practiced traditional beliefs, 18.76% were Moslem, and 18.47% were Protestant.

Based on figures from the Central Statistical Agency in 2005, this woreda has an estimated total population of 56,290, of whom 28,078 are men and 28,212 are women; 5,010 or 8.90% of the population are urban dwellers which is less than the Zone average of 10.7%. With an estimated area of 2,425.32 square kilometers, based on Dr. Keneni Jibat study, Dibate has a population density of 23.2 people per square kilometer which is above the Zone average of 8.57.

The 1994 national census reported a total population for this woreda of 41,570 in 8,831 households, of whom 20,843 were men and 20,727 were women; 2,912 or 7.01% of its population were urban dwellers. The five largest ethnic groups reported in Dibate were the Gumuz (30.6%), the Amhara (26.3%), the Oromo (24%), the Shinasha (16.5%) and the Awi (2%) a subgroup of the Agaw. Gumuz is spoken as a first language by 30.6%, 26.5% speak Amhara, Oromiffa 25%, and 2% Awngi. Most of the inhabitants practiced Ethiopian Orthodox Christianity, with 46% of the population reporting that they held that belief, while 25% observed traditional religions, 17.6% were Muslim, and 8.9% were Protestant. Concerning education, 15.49% of the population were considered literate, which is less than the Zone average of 18.61%; 11.22% of children aged 7–12 were in primary school; 4.62% of the children aged 13–14 were in junior secondary school; and 0.71% of the inhabitants aged 15–18 were in senior secondary school. Concerning sanitary conditions, 14.3% of the urban houses and 5.9% of all houses had access to safe drinking water at the time of the census; 57.6% of the urban and 7.1% of the total had toilet facilities.
