= Wenbera =

District in Benishangul-Gumuz Region, Ethiopia

Coordinates: 10°30′N 35°25′E

Wenbera is one of the 20 woredas in the Benishangul-Gumuz Region of Ethiopia. Part of the Metekel Zone, it is bordered on the south and west by the Kamashi Zone, on the north by the Beles River which separates it from Guba and Dangur, and by Bulen on the east; the Abay River defines the boundary between Wenbera and the Kamashi Zone.

Towns in Wenbera include Debre Zeyit. The highest point in this woreda is Mount Culan Sancai (2,435 meters), west of Debre Zeyit; other elevations include the Borema range, the Gum Gum mountains and the Sassie mountains in the northwest corner of the woreda. Rivers include the Naga, a south-flowing tributary of the Abay.

== Demographics ==
The 2007 national census reported a total population for this woreda of 60,000, of whom 29,196 were men and 30,804 were women; 5,476 or 9.13% of its population were urban dwellers. The majority of the inhabitants said they practiced Ethiopian Orthodox Christianity, with 70.77% of the population reporting they observed this belief, while 16.84% of the population were Moslem, 7.88% practiced traditional beliefs, and 4.02% were Protestant.

Based on figures from the Central Statistical Agency in 2005, this woreda has an estimated total population of 56,260, of whom 27,409 are men and 28,851 are women; 4,179 or 7.43% of the population are urban dwellers which are greater than the Zone average of 10.7%. With an estimated area of 7,134.53 square kilometers, Wenbera has a population density of 7.9 people per square kilometer which is lower than the Zone average of 8.57.

The 1994 national census reported a total population for this woreda of 41,686 in 8,050 households, of whom 20,411 were men and 21,275 were women; 2,429 or 5.83% of its population were urban. The five largest ethnic groups reported in Wenbera were the Shinasha (33.6%), the Oromo (33.4%), the Gumuz (27%), the Amhara (3.7%), and the Awi (1%) a subgroup of the Agaw; all other ethnic groups made up 1.3% of the population. Oromo is spoken as a first language by 40%, Gumuz by 27%, Boro by 5.1%, Amhara by 3.8%, and 0.7% spoke Berta; the remaining 23.4% spoke all other primary languages reported. The majority of the inhabitants practiced Ethiopian Orthodox Christianity, with 71% of the population reporting they held that belief, while 15.4% were Muslim, and 11% observed traditional religions. Concerning education, 17.31% of the population were considered literate, which is less than the Zone average of 18.61%; 7.96% of children aged 7–12 were in primary school; 2.02% of the children aged 13–14 were in junior secondary school; and 2.79% of the inhabitants aged 15–18 were in senior secondary school. Concerning sanitary conditions, 8.7% of the urban houses and 4.3% of all houses had access to safe drinking water at the time of the census, while 39.3% of the urban and 6.3% of all houses had toilet facilities.
