= Tana-Beles interbasin water transfer =

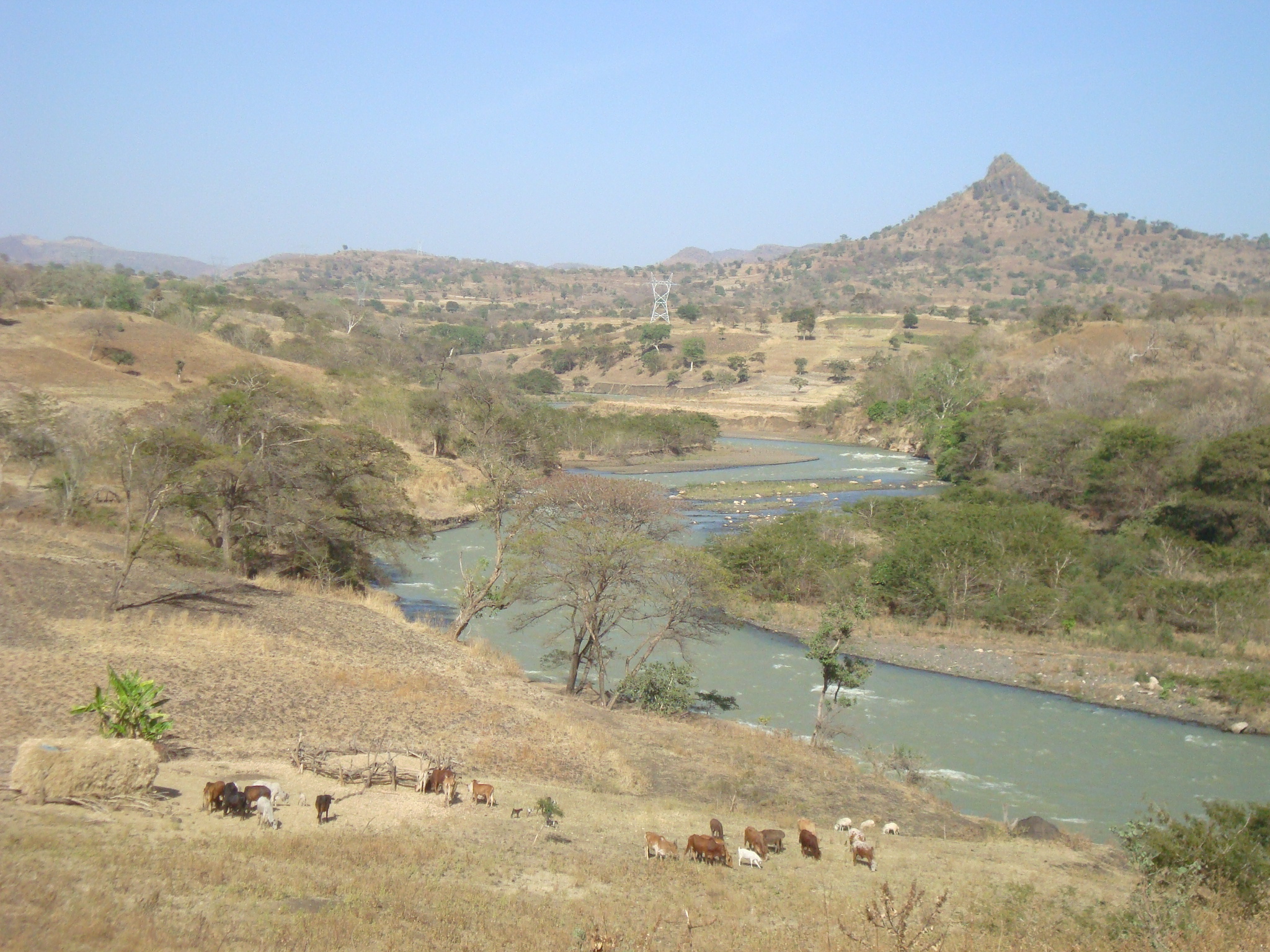
Beles River downstream of the outlet of the water transferred from Lake Tana

The Tana-Beles interbasin water transfer takes water from Lake Tana in Ethiopia and delivers it to the Beles River via the Tana Beles hydroelectric power plant. The water downstream is also used for irrigation.

== Technical characteristics ==
It was constructed between 2005 and 2010, specifically as a multi-purpose project, but with a major part of construction involving the hydropower plant, 11.8 km headrace tunnel from Lake Tana, and 7.2 km tailrace tunnel to the Jehana river (minor tributary of the Beles River).

While Lake Tana and the Beles River are both in the Blue Nile/Abbay basin, water would not usually flow from the lake through this river. The interbasin transfer project therefore provides substantial additional water within the Beles River region (on average 77 m^{3}/s), enabling irrigation development, notably of sugarcane.

== Social and environmental impacts ==
The Environmental Impact Assessment of the Tana-Beles interbasin water transfer is not available. The social impacts of the Tana-Beles water transfer have been studied and results published in the high-profile Journal of Hydrology: the dangerously high increases in discharge of Beles river have led to the drowning of 250 people between 2010 and 2018. The negative impacts on rural livelihoods are however overshadowed by national development goals (electricity production). The external costs (coping with damage) are borne by local people, who have low bargaining power.
