= Beles Hydroelectric Power Plant =

Hydroelectric power plant in Ethiopia

- Country: Ethiopia
- Coordinates: 11°49′10″N 36°55′08″E
- Status: Operational
- Commission date: 2010
- Owner: Ethiopian Electric Power

Thermal power station
- Primary fuel: Water
- Turbine technology: Run-of-the-river hydroelectric

Power generation
- Units operational: 4 x 115 MW Francis-type
- Nameplate capacity: 460 MW
- Annual net output: 1720 GWh Est.

The Beles Hydroelectric Power Plant, sometimes referred to as Beles II or Tana Beles, is a run-of-the-river hydroelectric power plant in Ethiopia near Lake Tana. The power plant receives water from the lake through the Tana-Beles interbasin transfer and after utilizing it to produce electricity, the water is then discharged into the Beles River. The plant has an installed capacity of 460 MW, making it the second largest power plant in the country. It is also expected to help provide water for the irrigation of 140,000 ha (350,000 acres). It was inaugurated in May 2010 and the last generator became operational in February 2012. Its construction was negatively perceived by downstream Egypt.

== Background and construction ==
In 1992, the first feasibility study was completed for the project, a 200 MW power station. A later study and final design was completed in 2005 by Studio Pietrangeli for the current 460 MW plant. The Government of Ethiopia signed a contract with Salini Costruttori to build the plant on July 8, 2005, and construction began soon after. Because of the project's remote location, transportation and manning of personnel and equipment was difficult, often taking 4–5 months for supplies to arrive. On June 2, 2007, a tunnel boring machine (TBM), operated by SELI, began boring the 7.2 km (4.5 mi) tailrace tunnel and completed it on May 31, 2008. Tunneling was carried out seven days a week in three eight-hour shifts a day. The TBM averaged 20 m (66 ft) per day while in January 2008, a maximum daily amount of 36 m (118 ft) was achieved. The TBM for the 12 km (7.5 mi) headrace tunnel broke through, completing it on August 11, 2009. Salini Costruttori awarded a sub contract to construct the actual power station to VA Tech Hydro. On May 11, 2010, the first 115 MW generator at the power plant began operation and on May 14, 2010, the plant was inaugurated. The project's cost was around $500 million USD. The power plant was fully operational in February 2012.

== Design ==
The Beles Hydroelectric Power Plant receives water from Lake Tana where it is transferred to a power station and then discharged through another tunnel and into the Beles River. This is first accomplished by an inlet on Lake Tana, where the power station can utilize 9,120,000,000 m^{3} (7,390,000 acre⋅ft) of the lake's volume for power production. The inlet channel is 43 m (141 ft) wide, 11.5 m (38 ft) high and its flow into the headrace tunnel is controlled by five floodgates. The headrace tunnel transfers the water to the southwest along its 12 km (7.5 mi) length within its diameter of 8.1 m (27 ft). At the end of the headrace tunnel, it converts into a 6.5 m (21 ft) diameter and 270 m (890 ft) long penstock before reaching the power station. At the power station, water is delivered to four Francis turbines powering four 115 MW generators. The power station is a cavern type and is 82 m (269 ft) long, 17.6 m (58 ft) high and 38.5 m (126 ft) wide. It has a 91.2 m (299 ft) deep and 8 m (26 ft) diameter surge shaft as well. Once the water is used in hydroelectric production it is then discharged from the power station to the Beles River via a 7.2 km (4.5 mi) tailrace tunnel with the same diameter as the headrace. Normal water level at the inlet is 1,800 m (5,900 ft) above sea level and the power station resides at 1,450 m (4,760 ft), allowing for 350 m (1,150 ft) of hydraulic head. The project is also expected to help irrigate 140,000 ha (350,000 acres) in the future as well.

== Social and environmental impacts for the downstream communities ==
The Environmental Impact Assessment of the Beles Hydroelectric Power Plant is considered a formality and is unfindable. The social impacts of the Tana-Beles water transfer have been studied and results published in the high-profile Journal of Hydrology: the dangerously high increases in discharge of Beles river have led to the drowning of 250 people between 2010 and 2018. The negative impacts on rural livelihoods are however overshadowed by national development goals (electricity production). The external costs (coping with damage) are borne by local people, who have low bargaining power.

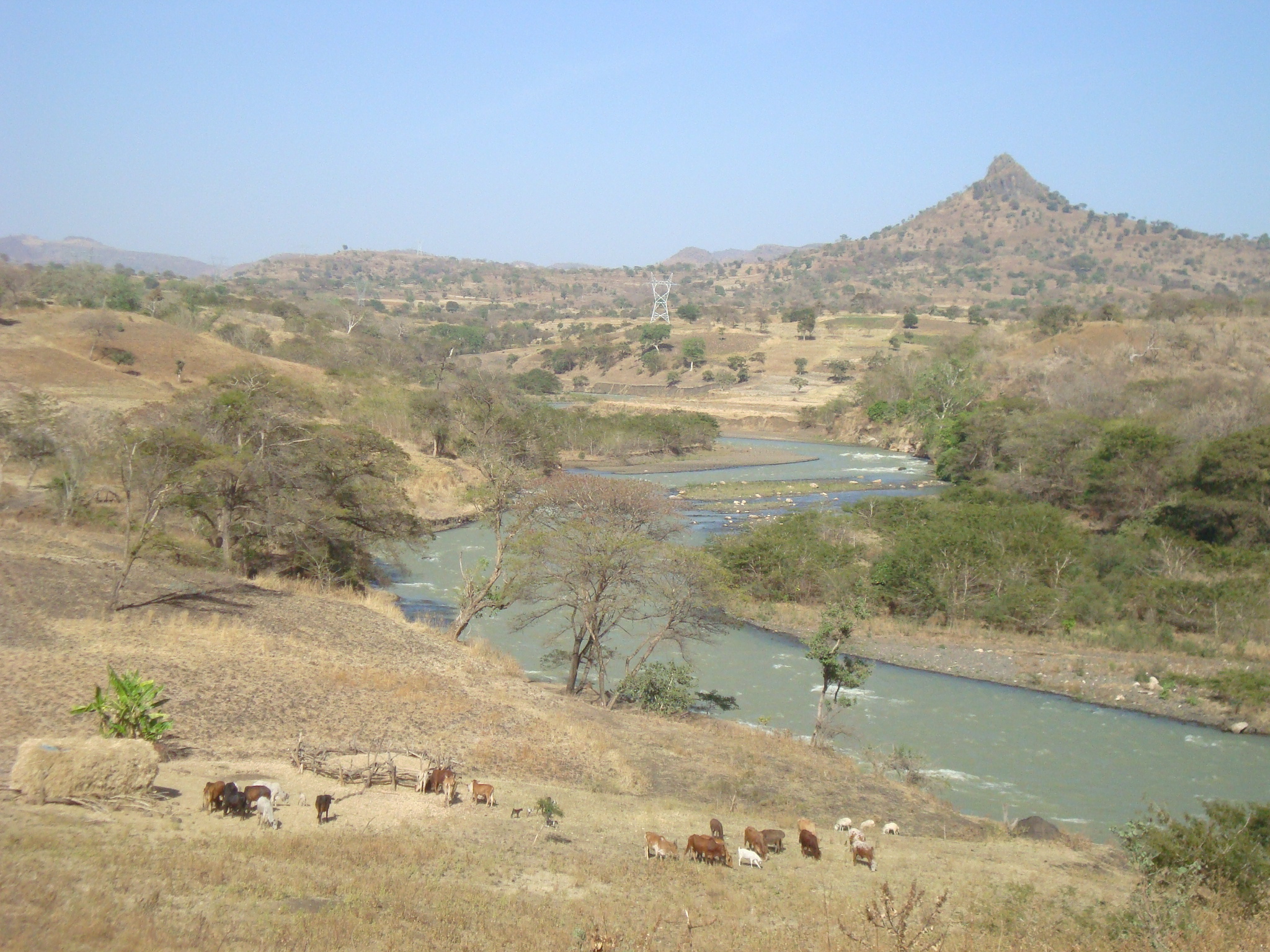
Beles River downstream of the hydropower outlet

== Egyptian opposition ==
The Beles Hydroelectric Power Plant is part of a larger issue amongst the Nile River Basin countries as the Beles River is a tributary of the Blue Nile and Lake Tana supplies the basin as well. After the inauguration of the power plant, statements were released from a meeting of Egyptian officials, one of which was "Tana Beles dam aims to provoke Egypt’s anger and lead it to take swift diplomatic action which would turn the global opinion in favor of the upstream Nile countries." The officials, many involved in the Nile River Sector, stated they had no information about the project. The power plant was inaugurated at the same time as a Cooperative Framework Agreement over the Nile Basin was signed by upstream countries such as Uganda, Rwanda, Tanzania, and Ethiopia, but downstream countries Sudan and Egypt refused to sign. Under colonial-era accords, only Sudan and Egypt were to benefit from the Nile's flow and could reject any upstream projects that would impede it.

== See also ==
- Energy in Ethiopia
- Water in Ethiopia
- Water politics in the Nile Basin
- List of power stations in Ethiopia
