= Mandura =

District of Ethiopia

Coordinates: 11°00′N 36°15′E

Mandura is one of the 20 Districts of Ethiopia, or woredas, in the Benishangul-Gumuz Region of Ethiopia. Part of the Metekel Zone, it is bordered by Dangur in the north and northwest, by Pawe special woreda in the northeast, by Amhara Region in the east, by Dibate in the south, and by Bulen in the southwest. Towns in Mandura include Genete Mariam.

Originally Mandura and Dibate were subunits of Guangua woreda, which was part of the Metekel awraja; in the 1960s these two subunits were split off to form separate woredas in order to strengthen government control over the local Gumuz people. Remaining parts of Guangua was transferred to Amhara when that region was organized in the 1992.

== Demographics ==
The 2007 national census reported a total population for this woreda of 40,746, of whom 21,241 were men and 19,505 were women; 7,518 or 18.45% of its population were urban dwellers. The majority of the inhabitants practiced traditional beliefs, with 47.76% of the population reporting they observed this belief, while 39.26% of the population said they practised Ethiopian Orthodox Christianity, and 7.59% were Moslem.

Based on figures from the Central Statistical Agency in 2005, this woreda has an estimated total population of 30,536, of whom 15,762 are men and 14,774 are women; 2,492 or 8.16% of the population are urban dwellers which is greater than the Zone average of 10.7%. With an estimated area of 1,003.76 square kilometers, Mandura has a population density of 30.4 people per square kilometer which is greater than the Zone average of 8.57.

The 1994 national census reported a total population for this woreda of 22,593 in 4,928 households, of whom 11,727 were men and 10,866 were women; 1,448 or 6.41% of its population were urban inhabitants. The four largest ethnic groups reported in Mandura were the Gumuz (87%), the Awi (8.9%) a subgroup of the Agaw, the Amhara (3.9%); all other ethnic groups made up 0.2% of the population. Gumuz is spoken as a first language by 87%, 8.4% speak Awngi, and 4.6% speak Amhara. The majority of the inhabitants practiced traditional religions, with 72.5% of the population reporting beliefs classified under that category, while 24.5% practiced Ethiopian Orthodox Christianity. Concerning education, 5.97% of the population were considered literate, which is less than the Zone average of 18.61%; 7.26% of children aged 7–12 were in primary school; 1.74% of the children aged 13–14 were in junior secondary school; and a negligible number of the inhabitants aged 15–18 were in senior secondary school. Concerning sanitary conditions, 82.6% of the urban houses and 7.7% of all houses had access to safe drinking water at the time of the census, while 38.4% of the urban and 7.6% of all houses had toilet facilities.
