= Metekel massacre =

2020 massacre in Benishangul-Gumuz Region, Ethiopia

- Part of the Benishangul-Gumuz conflict
- Metekel (Ethiopia)
- Location: Metekel Zone, Benishangul-Gumuz Region, Ethiopia
- Date: December 22–23, 2020
- Target: Oromo, Amhara, shinasha, Gumuz
- Attack type: Mass killing
- Deaths: 100 by Gumuz militia; 42 by (Ethiopia) ENDF
- Perpetrators: Gumuz militias; (Ethiopia) ENDF

The Metekel massacre was a massacre that took place on the night of 22–23 December 2020, in the Metekel Zone of the Benishangul-Gumuz Region, Ethiopia. As of 23 December 2020, the Ethiopian Human Rights Commission counted 100 deaths. Authorities responded by killing 42 suspects and arresting seven officials.

== Context ==
Several massacres took place in the Metekel Zone during 2019–2020. Different regional and federal authorities disagree on the characterisation of the conflict. The 22–23 December massacre followed several other ethnicity-related massacres in Ethiopia during late 2020.

== Massacre ==
A massacre and burning of houses took place during the night from 22 to 23 December 2020 in Bikuji Kebele in the Metekel Zone. Witness Tesfahun Amogne said that the residents had been surrounded by 500 gunmen. He said that security forces had been "repeatedly notified", and arrived after the attackers had left.

Amhara Mass Media Agency described the victims as ethnic Amhara and Agaw people and the killings as being "ethnically targeted".

Initial estimates of the number of dead included 90, 100 (Ethiopian Human Rights Commission, EHRC), 200 (National Movement of Amhara). On 30 December, the government-owned Ethiopian Herald stated that there had been 207 fatalities. According to the Red Cross 222 people were killed.

Based on interviews with five witnesses, Amnesty International described the perpetrators as ethnic Gumuz militias and the victims as ethnic Amharas, Oromo and Shinasha, seen by the Gumuz ethno nationalists as settlers.

== Response ==
The Ethiopian National Defense Force (ENDF) responded to the massacre by killing 42 people who were alleged by state media to have been involved in the massacre. Benishangul-Gumuz Region security forces arrested seven officials in relation to the massacre. On 30 December, Asrat Denero of the ENDF stated that a national joint task force of government officials and the ENDF had been created. Asrat said that the task force was seeking suspects. He stated that a process of community discussion "at all levels" had been started, with the aim of solving the root causes of the conflict.

== See also ==
- Amhara genocide
- 2020 Ethiopia bus attack
- Gimbi massacre
- Metekel conflict
- Mai Kadra massacre
