= Mankush =

Mankush is a town in western Ethiopia. Located in the Metekel Zone of the Benishangul-Gumuz Region, Mankush is the largest settlement in Guba woreda.

Based on figures from the Central Statistical Agency, in 2005 this town had an estimated total population of 1,255 of whom 664 were males and 591 were females. According to the 1994 national census, its total population was 729 of whom 384 were males and 345 were females.

Near the town, the palaces of two local rulers and slave traders are still preserved. The oldest one is built on top of a hill to the south of Gubba. It belonged to Manjil Hamdan Abu Shok and it was bombed by the British in 1940, as a prelude to the invasion of Ethiopia by the Allies. The palace had been occupied by the Italians, who had established a military base there. The other palace, in the plain, was built by his son, who had the same name. The palace was lavishly built: it had several rooms for Abu Shok's many wives and a mosque. Dutch explorer Juan Maria Schuver visited the town in the 1880s and reported on a visit to the Shinasha people living in the nearby mountains.

The British explorer Charles Beke passed through this town in March 1842. He notes its principal point of interest then was the monastery of St. Michael.
