= Almaz Ayana =

Ethiopian long-distance runner (born 1991)

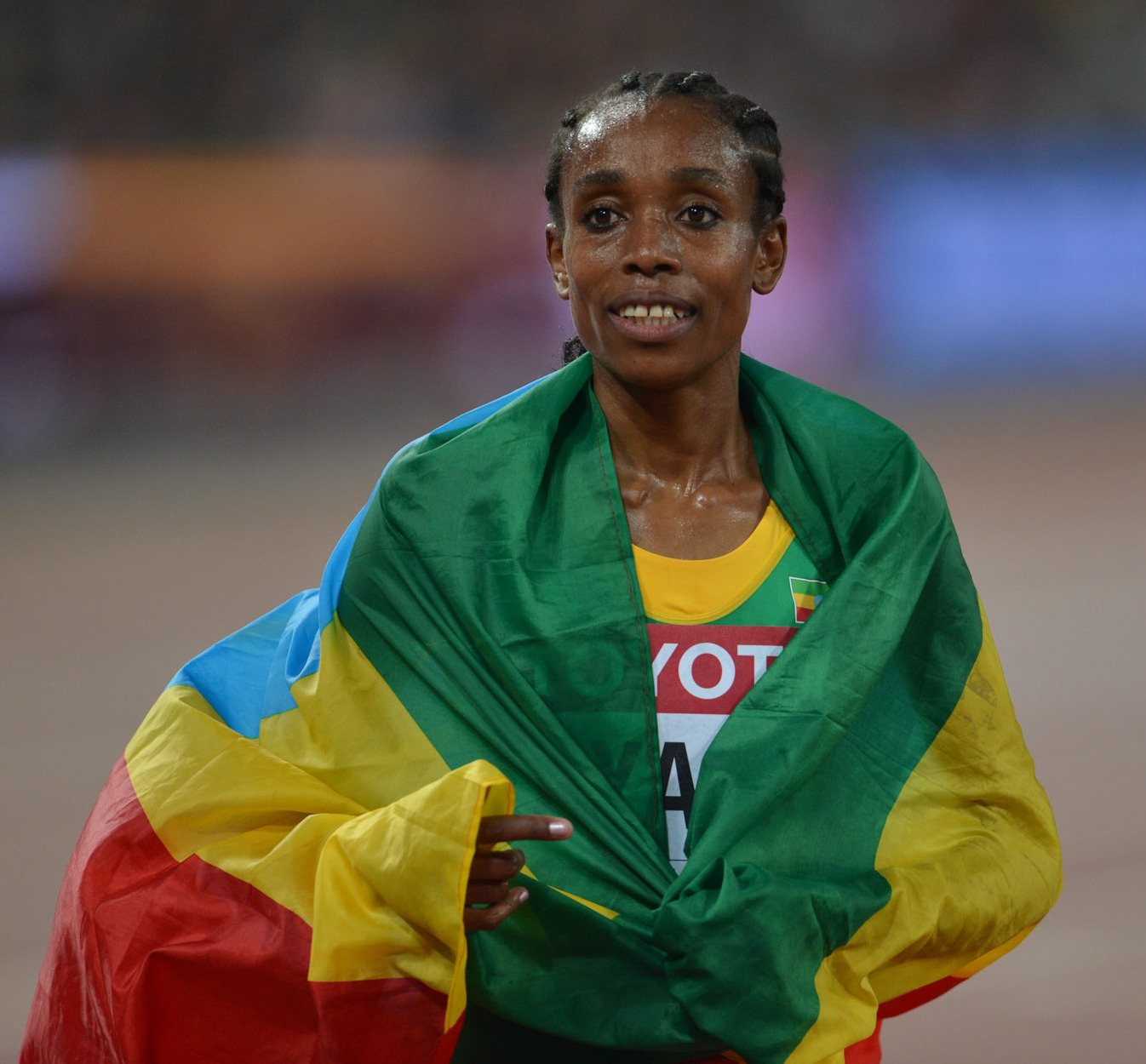
- Almaz at the 2015 World Championships in Athletics

Personal information
- Born: 21 November 1991 (age 35) Wenbera, Benishangul-Gumuz Region, Ethiopia
- Height: 1.66 m (5 ft 5 in)
- Weight: 47 kg (104 lb)

Sport
- Country: Ethiopia
- Sport: Athletics
- Event: Long-distance running
- Team: NN Running Team (2022–)

Achievements and titles
- Olympic finals: 2016 Rio; 5000 m, Bronze; 10,000 m, Gold
- World finals: 2013 Moscow; 5000 m, Bronze; 2015 Beijing; 5000 m, Gold; 2017 London; 5000 m, Silver; 10,000 m, Gold
- Personal bests: 5000 m: 14:12.59 (Rome 2016); 10,000 m: 29:17.45 (Rio de Janeiro 2016); Road; Half marathon: 65:30 (Lisbon 2023); Marathon: 2:17:20 (Amsterdam 2022)
Medal record
Women's athletics
Representing Ethiopia
Olympic Games
Gold medal – first place	2016 Rio de Janeiro	10,000 m
Bronze medal – third place	2016 Rio de Janeiro	5000 m
World Championships
Gold medal – first place	2015 Beijing	5000 m
Gold medal – first place	2017 London	10,000 m
Silver medal – second place	2017 London	5000 m
Bronze medal – third place	2013 Moscow	5000 m
Diamond League
First place	2016	5000 m
African Championships
Gold medal – first place	2014 Marrakesh	5000 m
Representing Africa
Continental Cup
Gold medal – first place	2014 Marrakesh	5000 m

Almaz Ayana Eba (Oromo: Almaaz Ayyanaa Eebbaa; Amharic: አልማዝ አያና ኤባ, born 21 November 1991) is an Ethiopian long-distance runner. She won the gold medal in the 10,000 metres and bronze in the 5,000 metres at the 2016 Rio Olympics. Almaz is a four-time World Athletics Championships medallist earning a bronze for the 5,000m in 2013, gold at the event in 2015 as well as gold in the 10,000m and silver in the 5,000m in 2017.

She broke the 10,000 metres world record, set in 1993, while winning the gold medal at the Rio Olympics and held it until 2021. At the 2017 World Championships in London, Almaz won the title in the 10,000m, finishing 46 seconds ahead of the runner-up. She finished third in both the 5,000m and 10,000m on the respective world all-time lists. In 2016, she was voted IAAF Female World Athlete of the Year.

Almaz set the fastest ever women's marathon debut at the 2022 Amsterdam Marathon.

== Early life and background ==
Almaz Ayana was born in Wenbera, Benishangul-Gumuz Region, Ethiopia. Born the seventh youngest of nine siblings, she started running at local school around age 13–14. Like other notable athletes such as Fatuma Roba and Derartu Tulu, Almaz is also Oromo descent. In addition to her native Oromo language, she also speaks Amharic. The name Almaz means 'diamond' in Amharic.

Almaz is married to her childhood friend and longtime partner, Soressa Fida. She is a devout Christian.

== Career ==
=== 2013–2014: World 5000 m bronze in Moscow ===
At age 21, Almaz won a bronze medal in the 5000 metres at the 2013 World Championships in Athletics held in Moscow, Russia.

At the 2014 African Championships in Marrakesh, she defeated favourite Genzebe Dibaba to take the title in a championship record time of 15:32.72. One month later at the Continental Cup also held in Marrakesh, she won the 5000 m by over 24 seconds.

=== 2015: World 5000 m champion in Beijing ===
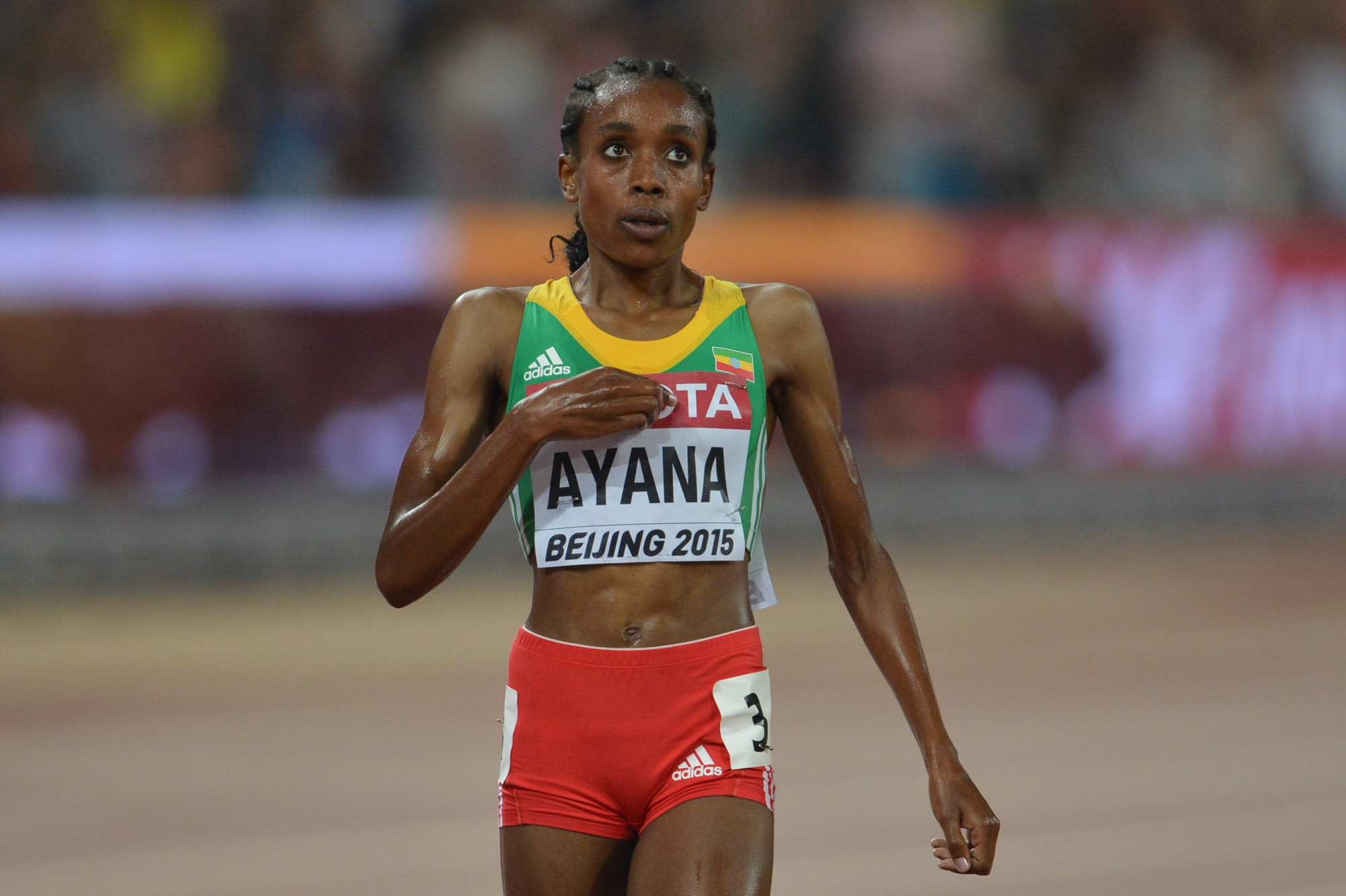
At the 2015 World Championships in Athletics in Beijing, Almaz won her first world title with a 5000 m victory.

In May 2015, Almaz ran a personal best of 14:14.32 over 5000 m at the Diamond League meeting in Shanghai, China, improving significantly upon her previous personal best of 14:25.84 set in 2013 in Paris. This made her the third fastest female athlete over that distance, behind compatriots Tirunesh Dibaba, the world record holder, and Meseret Defar. At the Beijing World Championships in August, she put on a stunning display of front-running to win the 5000 m final with a time of 14:26.83, setting a new championship record in the process and beating silver medalist Senbere Teferi by more than 17 seconds with Genzebe Dibaba in third. Her win was named the Performance of the Championships by World Athletics. In her final race of the season, Almaz set a new 3000 m meeting record of 8:22.34 to beat Tirunesh Dibaba at the Zurich Diamond League.

=== 2016: Rio Olympic 10,000 m champion with a world record, bronze at 5000 m ===
Almaz opened her season by winning over 3000 m at the Doha Diamond League on 6 May, running a time of 8:23.11 which narrowly missed her personal best. On 2 June 2016, Almaz set a new personal best in the 5000 m in a time of 14:12.59 at the Rome Diamond League. This made her the second fastest woman ever at this distance, behind only Tirunesh Dibaba's world record of 14:11.15, and established a new circuit record. Later that month, she ran the 10,000 metres competitively for the first time at the Ethiopian Olympic trials in Hengelo, Netherlands. She posted the fastest ever debut time of 30:07.00, defeating Tirunesh Dibaba and moving up to eighth on the world all-time list.

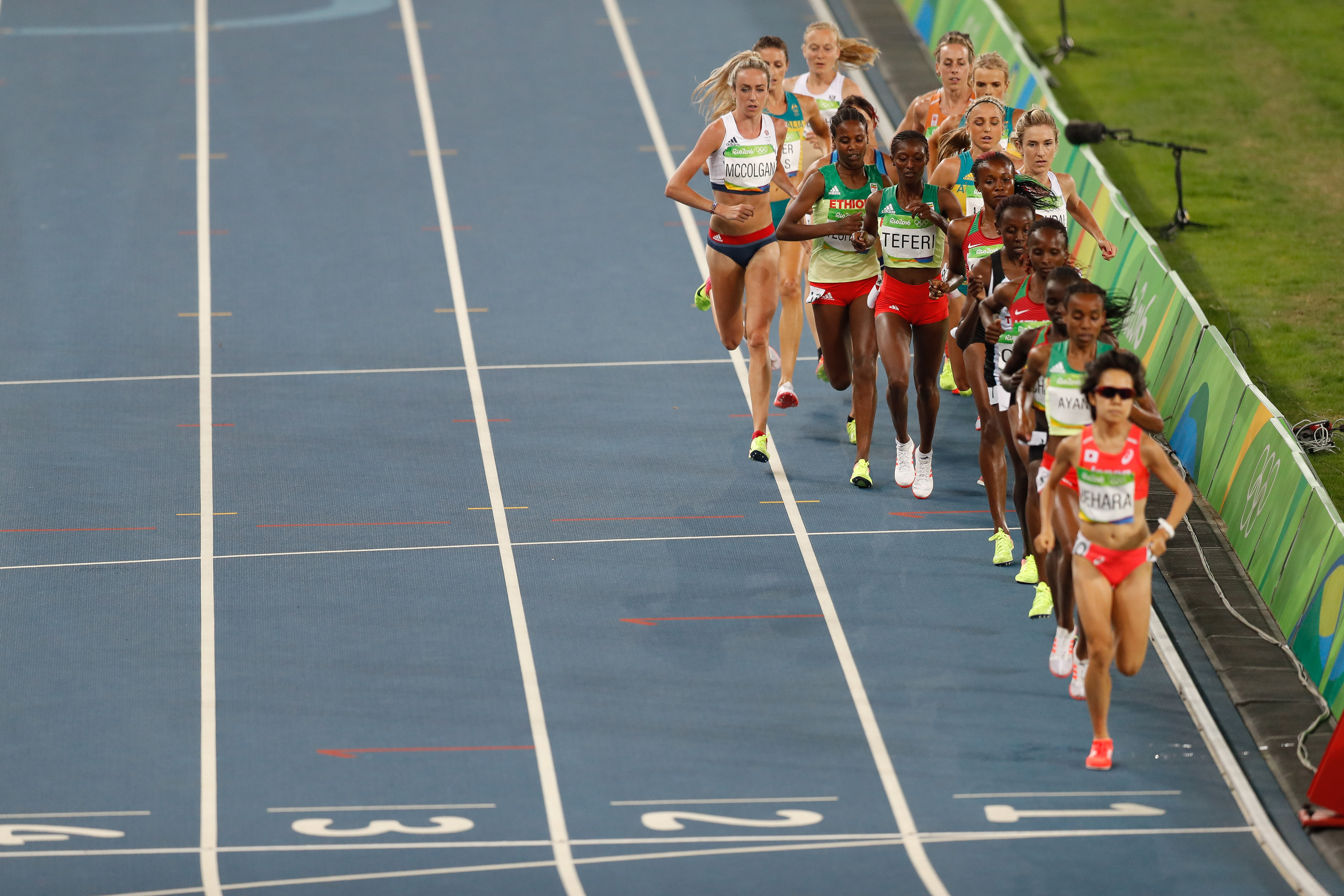
Almaz (in second) on her way to 10,000 m gold at the 2016 Rio Olympics.

At the 2016 Summer Olympics held in August in Rio de Janeiro, Almaz set a world record of 29:17.45 in the 10,000 metres, topping Chinese athlete Wang Junxia's 23-year-old world record by 14 seconds. No one previously had run within 22 seconds of Wang's record. The 10,000 metres was already an extremely fast race when Ayana broke away with 12 laps to go. Second-placed Vivian Cheruiyot of Kenya finished just a second shy of Wang's record and double Olympic 10,000 metres champion Tirunesh Dibaba earned the bronze medal with a 12 seconds improvement on her personal best and the fourth fastest time in history. Multiple national records were set, and eighteen competitors set personal bests. The lax drug testing regime in Ethiopia and the doping scandals that embroiled athletics before the Rio Olympics caused some to question whether Almaz had been doping. British commentators Brendan Foster and Paula Radcliffe, both former world record holders in distance events, were skeptical about Almaz's performance. Fellow competitors reported that before the race, the Ethiopian was coughing and did not seem well. In her post-race press conference, Almaz said her time was purely the outcome of hard training. On 9 September, in her first race since the Olympics, Almaz attempted to break Tirunesh Dibaba's 2008 5000 m world record of 14:11.15 at the Brussels Diamond League. Despite a strong start, she fell short of breaking the record but did set a meeting record of 14:18.99.

=== 2017: 10,000 m gold and 5000 m silver at the London World Championships ===
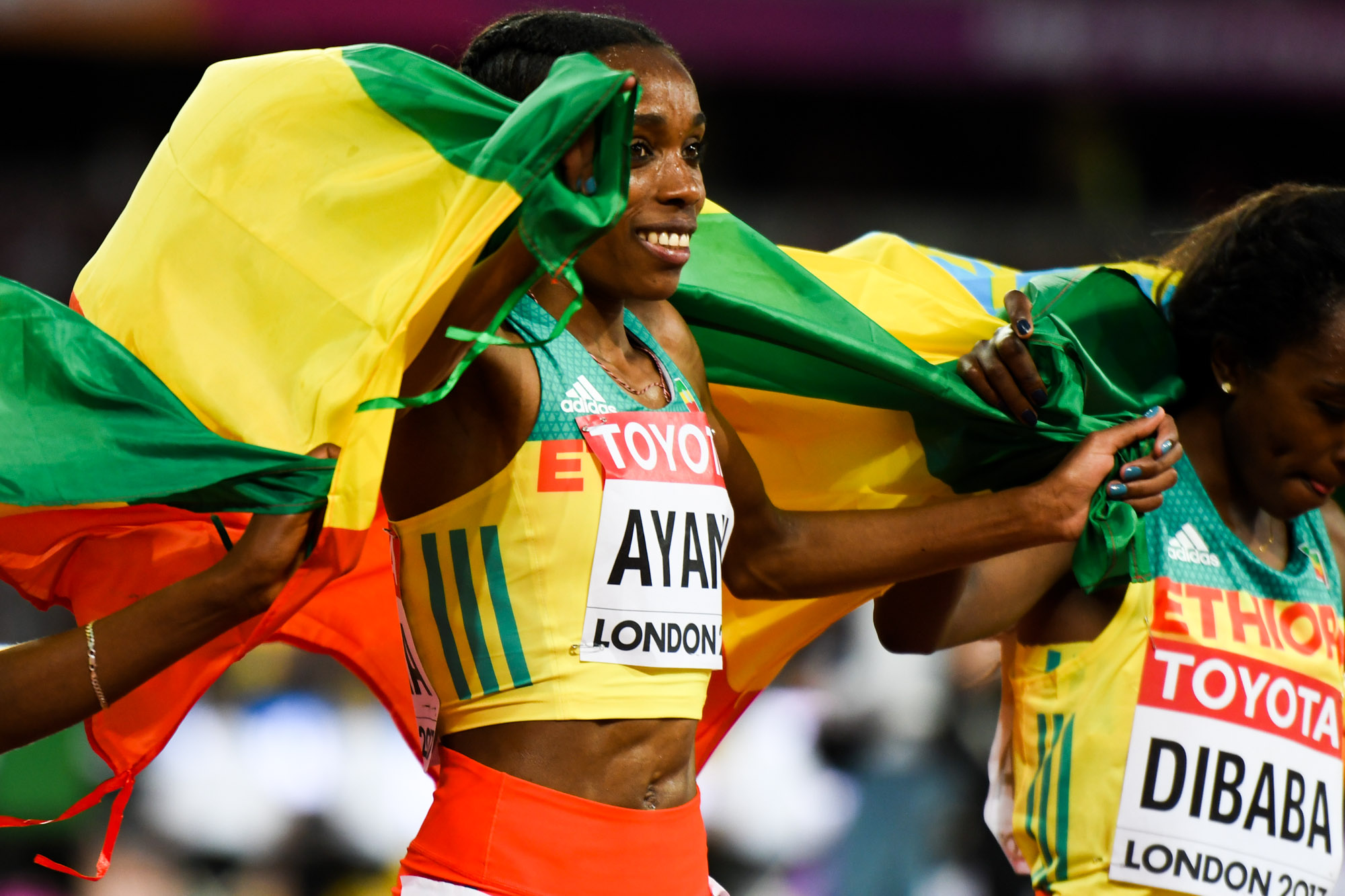
Almaz celebrates her 10,000 m win at the 2017 World Championships in Athletics in London.

On 5 August 2017, Almaz secured a dominant victory as she won over 10,000 metres at the World Championships in London with a world-leading 30:16.32, She ran her final 5,000 m in 14:24.94, a time that would've placed her seventh on the all-time 5,000 m lists at the time. Her win set the record for the biggest margin of victory over 10,000 m at a World Championship and was described as "one of the finest displays in women’s distance running history" by Letsrun. She went on to add a silver for the 5,000 metres eight days later, having run a time of 14:40.35 to finish behind Kenya's Hellen Obiri (14:34.86). Almaz made her debut over the half marathon at the New Delhi Half Marathon winning in a time of 1:07:12.

=== 2018–present: Injuries, motherhood and comeback ===
The Ethiopian distance running star took almost three years off due to injury problems and pregnancy. Her only race during this time was at the 2019 Prefontaine Classic where she placed 18th over 3,000 m in a time of 8:57.16. Almaz started regularly competing again from April 2022.

Almaz made her return to the track at the 2022 FBK Games in Hengelo, placing seventh over the 10,000 m in 30:48.48. She also placed sixth over 5,000 m at the Oslo Diamond League in 14:32.17.

On 16 October 2022, the 30-year-old made the fastest ever women's marathon debut of 2:17:20 at the Amsterdam Marathon to win the race and defeat her old-time rival Genzebe Dibaba by 45 seconds. Almaz beat the course record by almost 40 seconds, setting a Dutch all-comers' record (best performance on country's soil) and putting her seventh on the world all-time list at the time.

In 2023, Almaz opened her season by winning the Lisbon Half Marathon in a course record of 1:05:30. On 17 September, Almaz competed over the 10 mile distance for the first time by placing third at the Dam tot Damloop in Zaandam in 52:23. She set a new personal best for the marathon of 2:16:20 in finishing second behind Worknesh Degefa at the Valencia Marathon.

== Recognition ==
- 2016 – IAAF Female World Athlete of the Year.

== Achievements ==
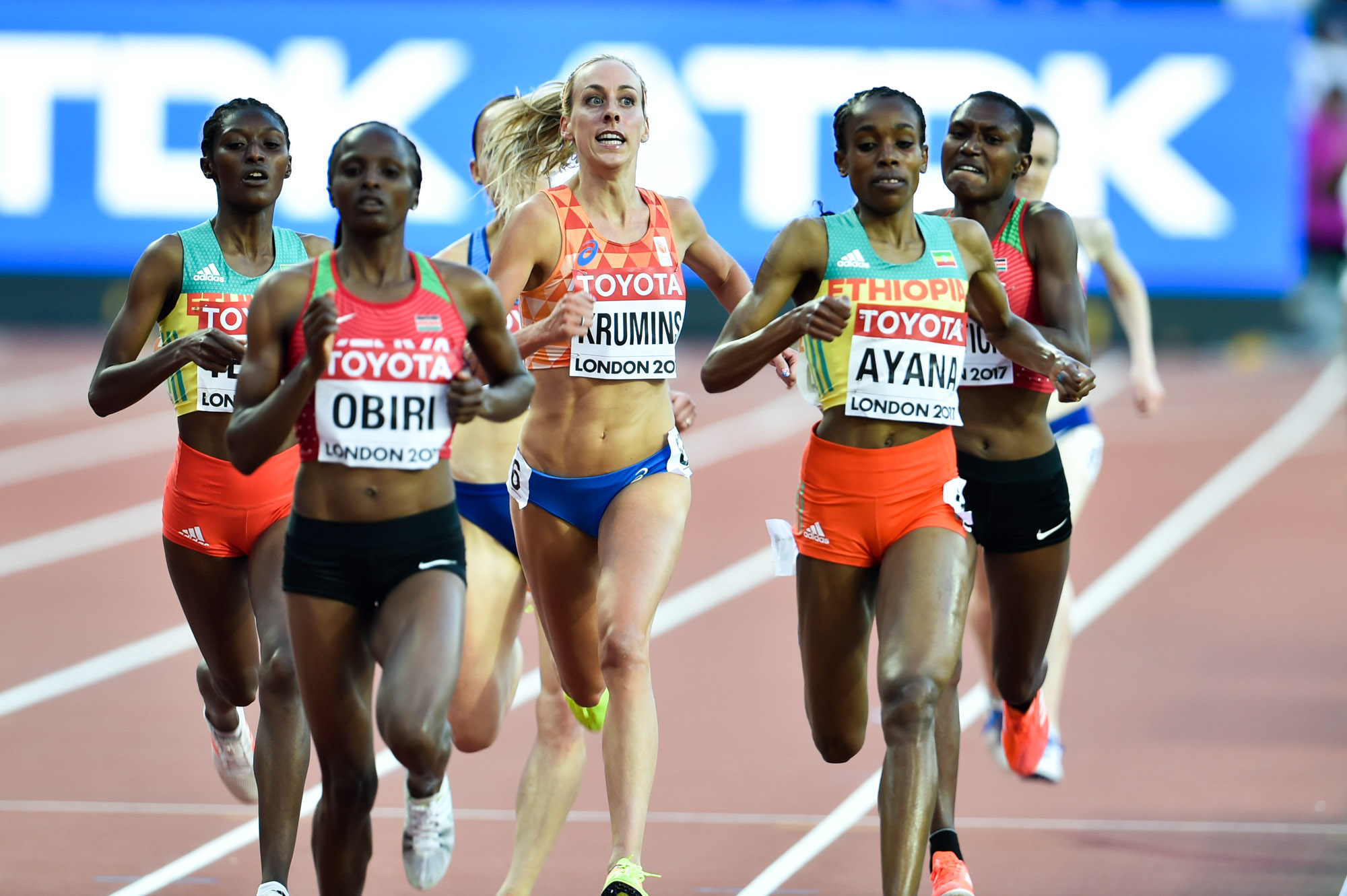
Almaz (second from the right) races in her 5000 m heat at the 2017 London World Championships, where she won silver in the final and gold for the 10,000 m.

Information from World Athletics profile unless otherwise noted.

=== International competitions ===
Representing Ethiopia
Year	Competition	Venue	Position	Event	Notes
2010	World Junior Championships	Moncton, Canada	5th	3000 m st.	9:48.08
2013	World Championships	Moscow, Russia	3rd	5000 m	14:51.33
2014	African Championships	Marrakesh, Morocco	1st	5000 m	15:32.72 CR
2014	Continental Cup	Marrakesh, Morocco	1st	5000 m	15:33.32
2015	World Championships	Beijing, China	1st	5000 m	14:26.83 CR
2016	Olympic Games	Rio de Janeiro, Brazil	3rd	5000 m	14:33.59
2016	Olympic Games	Rio de Janeiro, Brazil	1st	10,000 m	29:17.45 OR WR
2017	World Championships	London, United Kingdom	2nd	5000 m	14:40.35
2017	World Championships	London, United Kingdom	1st	10,000 m	30:16.32

=== Personal bests ===
Surface	Event	Time (h):m:s	Place	Date	Notes
Track	3000 metres	8:22.22	Rabat, Morocco	14 June 2015	
Track	5000 metres	14:12.59	Rome, Italy	2 June 2016	3rd of all time
Track	10,000 metres	29:17.45	Rio de Janeiro, Brazil	12 August 2016	3rd of all time, previous WR
Road	10 kilometres	32:19	Luanda, Angola	31 December 2010	
Road	Half marathon	1:05:30	Lisbon, Portugal	12 March 2023	
Road	Marathon	2:17:20	Amsterdam, Netherlands	16 October 2022	

=== Circuit wins and titles, National titles ===
- Diamond League Overall 5000 m winner: 2016
  - 2015 (2): Shanghai Golden Grand Prix (5000m, WL DLR), Zürich Weltklasse (3000m, MR)
  - 2016 (4): Qatar Athletic Super Grand Prix (3000m, WL), Rabat Meeting International Mohammed VI d'Athlétisme (5000m, WL MR), Rome Golden Gala - Pietro Mennea (5000m, WL DLR), Brussels Memorial Van Damme (5000m, MR)
- Ethiopian Athletics Championships
  - 5000 metres: 2014
  - 3000 metres steeplechase: 2013

Records
Preceded by (China) Wang Junxia	Women's 10,000 m World Record Holder; 12 August 2016 – 6 June 2021	Succeeded by (Netherlands) Sifan Hassan
Awards
Preceded by (Ethiopia) Genzebe Dibaba	IAAF World Athlete of the Year; 2016	Succeeded by (Belgium) Nafissatou Thiam
