= Debre Zeyit, Benishangul Gumuz =

Debre Zeyit
- Location within Ethiopia
- Coordinates: 10°35′N 35°48′E
- Country: Ethiopia
- Region: Benishangul-Gumuz
- Zone: Metekel Zone
- Elevation: 2,097 m (6,880 ft)

Population (2005)
  - Total: 4,179
- Time zone: UTC+3 (EAT)

Debre Zeyit (also known as Wenbera) is a town in western Ethiopia. Located in the Metekel Zone of the Benishangul-Gumuz Region, Debre Zeit has a latitude and longitude of 10°35′N 35°48′E with an elevation of 2097 meters above sea level.

The town was visited in 1900 by the American traveller Oscar T. Crosby, who mentions the presence of a market and an Ethiopian military outpost. Crosby knew the settlement as Wenbera, as did the consul R E Cheesman, who stayed there for a few days in April 1927. He described the settlement as "a large village of a few hundred houses and is important chiefly for its market and as a centre for caravan traffic. One set of merchants plies between there and Roseires in the Sudan, and another goes to the Abyssinian main plateau; both carry the famous coffee grown at Kitar in the Wanbera district. We had reached an altitude where the Amhara can live, but the population is strongly oromo."

== Demographics ==
Based on figures from the Central Statistical Agency in 2005, Debre Zeyit has an estimated total population of 4,179 of whom 1,936 were males and 2,243 were females. According to the 1994 national census, its total population was 2,429 of whom 1,120 were males and 1,309 were females. It is the largest settlement in Wenbera woreda.
