= Genete Mariam =

- Location within Ethiopia
- Coordinates: 11°01′N 36°06′E
- Country: Ethiopia
- Region: Benishangul-Gumuz
- Zone: Metekel Zone
- Elevation: 2,331 m (7,648 ft)

Population (2005)
  - Total: 2,492
- Time zone: UTC+3 (EAT)

Genete Mariam is a town in western Ethiopia. Located in the Metekel Zone of the Benishangul-Gumuz Region, Genete Mariam has a latitude and longitude of 11°01′N 36°06′E with an elevation of 2331 meters above sea level.

Based on figures from the Central Statistical Agency, in 2005 this town has an estimated total population of 2,492 of whom 1,172 were males and 1,320 were females. According to the 1994 national census, its total population was 1,448 of whom 678 were males and 770 were females. It is the largest settlement in Mandura woreda.
