= Dangur =

Coordinates: 11°30′N 35°50′E

Dangur is one of the 20 Districts of Ethiopia, or woredas, in the Benishangul-Gumuz Region of Ethiopia. It is named after the Dangur range of mountains, which extend southwest from the mountains along the west side of Lake Tana. The administrative center of this woreda is Manbuk.

Part of the Metekel Zone, Dangur is bordered by Amhara Region in the northeast, by Pawe special woreda in the east, by Mandura in the southeast, by Bulen in the south, by Wenbera in the southwest, and by Guba in the west. Landmarks include the rock of Abu Ramlah in the westernmost part of the woreda, which was made into a fortified village by the local inhabitants, which was visited by Juan Maria Schuver June 1882.

== Demographics ==
The 2007 national census reported a total population for this woreda of 48,537, of whom 24,360 were men and 24,177 were women; 8,352 or 17.21% of its population were urban dwellers. The majority of the inhabitants said they practised Ethiopian Orthodox Christianity, with 59.83% of the population reporting they observed this belief, while 26.84% of the population were Moslem, and 12.85% practiced traditional beliefs.

Based on figures from the Central Statistical Agency in 2005, this woreda has an estimated total population of 42,059, of whom 20,778 are men and 21,281 are women; 5,596 or 13.31% of the population are urban dwellers which is greater than the Zone average of 10.7%. With an estimated area of 8,387.19 square kilometers, Dangur has a population density of 5 people per square kilometer which is less than the Zone average of 8.57.

The 1994 national census reported a total population for this woreda of 30,741 in 5,948 households, of whom 15,284 were males and 15,457 were females; 3,253 or 10.58% of its population were urban dwellers. The four largest ethnic groups reported in Dangur were the Awi (40.5%) a subgroup of the Agaw, Gumuz (34%), the Amhara (16.5%), and the Shinasha (3.3%); all other ethnic groups made up 5.7% of the population. Awngi is spoken as a first language by 40%, 34% speak Gumuz, 17.5% speak Amharic, and 3.2% speak Boro; the remaining 5.3% spoke all other primary languages reported. The majority of the inhabitants practiced Ethiopian Orthodox Christianity, with 52% of the population reporting that they held that belief, while 21.6% traditional religions, and 21% were Muslim. Concerning education, 11.51% of the population were considered literate, which is less than the Zone average of 18.61%; 11.83% of children aged 7–12 were in primary school; 2.02% of the children aged 13–14 were in junior secondary school; and 0.18% of the inhabitants aged 15–18 were in senior secondary school. Concerning sanitary conditions, 12.6% of the urban houses and 2.9% of all houses had access to safe drinking water at the time of the census; 34% of the urban and about 7.4% of the total had toilet facilities.
