= Audrey H. Sawyer =

American hydrogeologist researcher

Audrey Hucks Sawyer
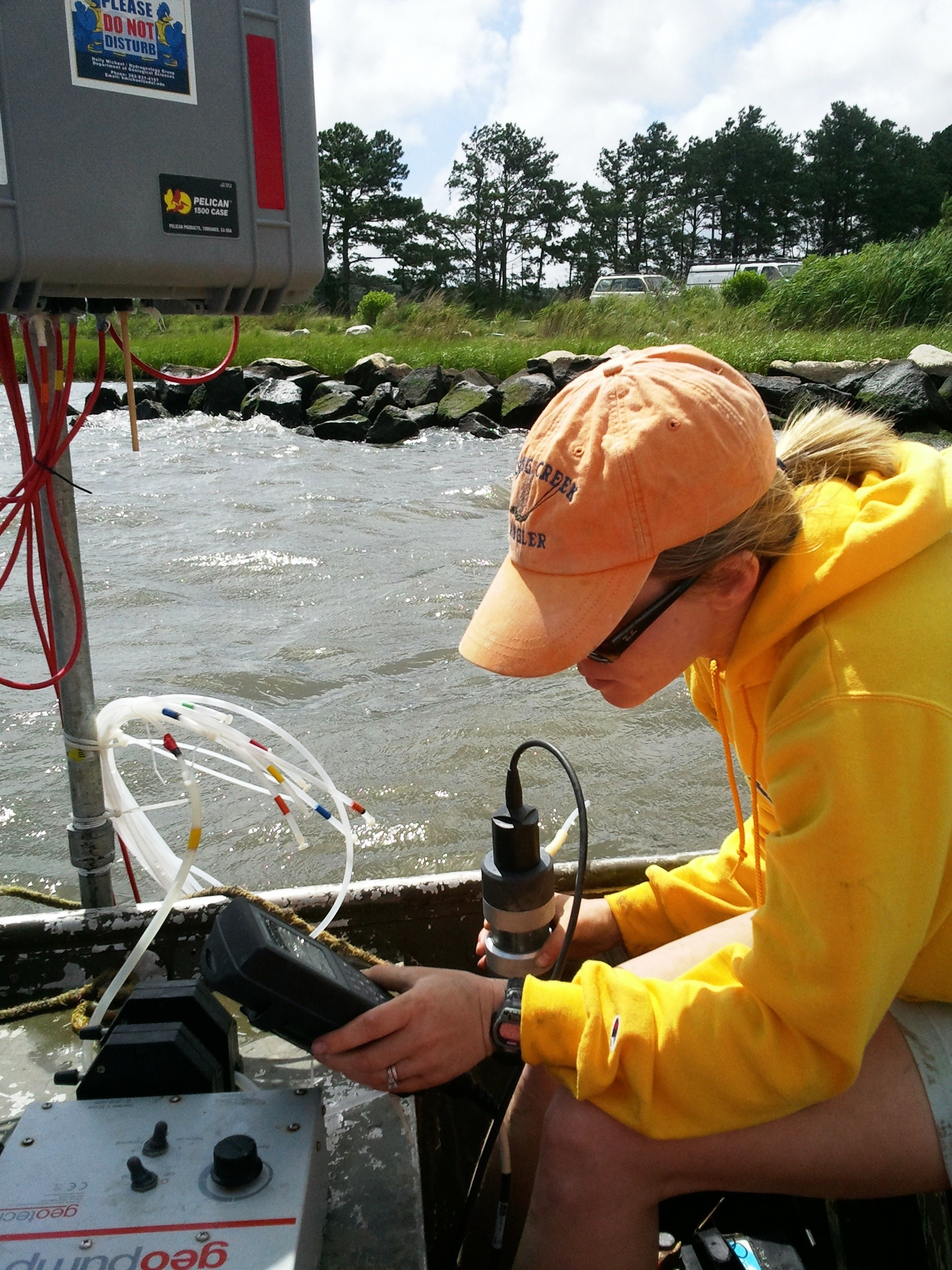
- Education: PhD University of Texas-Austin 2011
- Awards: GSA Kohout Early career Award; NSF CAREER Award
- Scientific career
- Fields: groundwater-surface water interactions, hydrogeology, coastal hydrology
- Workplaces: Ohio State University; University of Kentucky; University of Delaware
- Thesis: Complexity in river-groundwater exchange due to permeability heterogeneity, in-stream flow obstacles, and river stage fluctuations. (2011)
- Doctoral advisor: M Bayani Cardenas
- Website: http://u.osu.edu/sawyer.143/

Audrey Hucks Sawyer is an American hydrogeologist and Assistant Professor of Earth Science at Ohio State University. Her work has focused on quantifying the role of groundwater - surface water interactions in transporting nutrients, contaminants, and heat in rivers and coastal settings. Sawyer has won multiple awards, including the National Science Foundation CAREER Award in 2018 and the Kohout Early Career Award in 2016.

== Early life and education ==
In 2004 Audrey Sawyer graduated summa cum laude from Rice University with a Bachelor of Science in Earth Science and Environmental Engineering. In 2007, Sawyer attended Pennsylvania State University, from which she received a Master of Science in Geoscience.

In 2011 Sawyer obtained her Doctor of Philosophy in Geological Science at University of Texas at Austin. Her thesis focused on the "Complexity in river-groundwater exchange due to permeability heterogeneity, in-stream flow obstacles, and river stage fluctuations."

== Career and research ==
Following her Doctoral degree, Sawyer worked as a Post Doctoral Researcher at the University of Delaware from 2011 until 2012. Subsequently, Sawyer was hired as an Assistant Professor of Earth and Environmental sciences at University of Kentucky from 2012 until 2014. Following this, Sawyer became an Assistant Professor of Earth Science at Ohio State University from 2014 to present. Sawyer's work focuses on analyzing the surface - groundwater interactions in rivers and coastal settings in order to quantify the level of contaminants, nutrients, and heat being transported between these bodies of water. She uses field observations, controlled laboratory column experiments, and computer models to study surface and groundwater content.

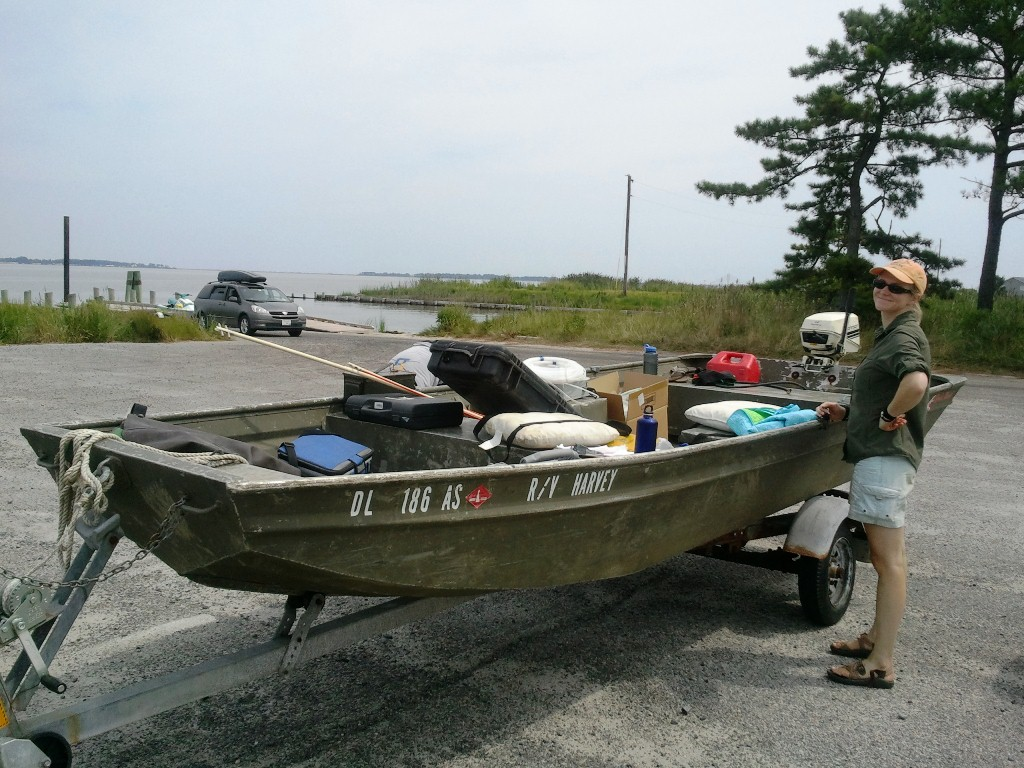

Sawyer is member of the American Geophysical Union and of the American Association for the Advancement of Science. She is also an Officer at the Consortium of Universities for the Advancement of Hydrologic Science Incorporated. Sawyer has been the lead investigator of research done for the United States Geological Survey during 2014 and 2017.

Sawyer's work has been published by multiple journals, such as Water Resources Research, Geophysical Research Letters, Journal of Geophysical Research: Bio-geosciences section, and Oceans section. In addition to this, she has been published by Journal of Hydrology, GroundWater Journal, as well as the scientific journals supported by the American Association for the Advancement of Science. Her work also includes the publication of over 60 articles that are peer reviewed.

Sawyer's most cited research focused on "Hyporheic flow and residence time distributions in heterogeneous cross-bedded sediment" (2009). This study quantified how the permeability of cross beds influence the ground-water and river bed water exchange, also referred as the hyporheic exchange.

Sawyer received the Kohout Early Career Award in 2016 from the Geological Society of America's Hydrology Division. "The award will be presented to a distinguished early career scientist for outstanding achievement in contributing to the Hydrogeological profession through original research and service, and for the demonstrated potential of continued excellence throughout their career."

In 2018, she was awarded the National Science Foundation CAREER Award. This award was given to her for her research done on "Spectral analysis of continuous redox data reveals geochemical dynamics near the stream-aquifer interface".

== Publications ==
Partial list of published works.

- Hyporheic flow and residence time distributions in heterogeneous cross-bedded sediment (2009)
- "Impact of dam operations on hyporheic exchange in the riparian zone of a regulated river" (2009)
- "Hyporheic exchange due to channel-spanning logs" (2011)
- "Multiscale hyporheic exchange through strongly heterogeneous sediments" (2015)
- "Continental patterns of submarine groundwater discharge reveal coastal vulnerabilities" (2016)
- "Spectral analysis of continuous redox data reveals geochemical dynamics near the stream-aquifer interface" (2018)

== Awards and honors ==
- National Science Foundation CAREER Award (2018)
- Kohout Early Career Award given by Geological Society of America's Hydrology Division (2016)
- American Geophysical Union Editor's Choice Award for Excellence in Refereeing in Geophysical Research Letters (2015)
- American Geophysical Union Editor's Choice Award for Excellence in Refereeing in Water Resources Research (2014)
- American Geophysical Union Horton Research Grant recipient (2009)
