= Gulla (river) =

River in Ethiopia

Gulla River Gudle
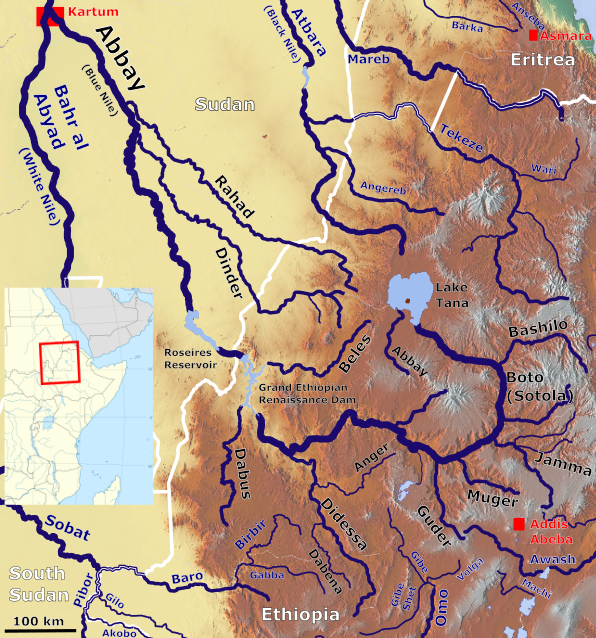
- Map of the Abbay basin. The unlabelled right tributary of the Abbay is the Gulla River

Location
- Country: Ethiopia

Physical characteristics
- Source: Choqa Mountains
  - coordinates: 10°44′51.76″N 37°45′27.22″E
- Mouth: Temcha River
  - coordinates: 10°31′31.724″N 37°29′36.971″E
  - elevation: 2,000 m (6,600 ft)

Basin features
- Progression: Temcha → Birr → Blue Nile → Nile → Mediterranean Sea
- River system: Nile Basin

The Gulla river is a river in Ethiopia which rises in the Choke mountains. It is one of the major tributaries of the Abay or Blue Nile. The flow of Gulla river reaches its maximum volume in the rainy season (from June to September). The river joins Temcha river after it crosses the town of Dembecha.

Human activities, such as waste dumping, irrigation, and runoff from towns has impacted the health of the Gulla river.
