= Manbuk =

- Location within Ethiopia
- Coordinates: 11°17′N 36°13′E
- Country: Ethiopia
- Region: Benishangul-Gumuz
- Zone: Metekel Zone
- Elevation: 1,200 m (3,900 ft)

Population (2007)
  - Total: 8,352
- Time zone: UTC+3 (EAT)

Manbuk is a town in western Ethiopia. Located in the Metekel Zone of the Benishangul-Gumuz Region, Manbuk has a latitude and longitude of 11°17′N 36°13′E. The city is located near the southern foot of Mount Belaya, at an elevation of 1200 meters. It is the administrative center of Dangur, and the largest settlement in that woreda.

G.E.D. Allen passed through this town in 1941, which is opposite a gap in the Western Escarpment of the Ethiopian Highlands.

Based on figures from the Central Statistical Agency in 2005, this town has an estimated total population of 5,596, of whom 2,528 are men and 3,068 are women. According to the 1994 national census, its total population was 3,253, of whom 1463 were men and 1790 were women.
