= 2014 African Championships in Athletics – Women's 5000 metres =

The women's 5000 metres event at the 2014 African Championships in Athletics was held on August 11 on Stade de Marrakech.

== Results ==
Rank	Name	Nationality	Time	Notes
1st place, gold medalist(s)	Almaz Ayana	Ethiopia	15:32.72	CR
2nd place, silver medalist(s)	Genzebe Dibaba	Ethiopia	15:42.16	
3rd place, bronze medalist(s)	Janeth Kisa	Kenya	15:54.04	
4	Margaret Wangari	Kenya	15:55.18	
5	Mercy Cherono	Kenya	16:08.81	
6	Kidusan Alema	Ethiopia	16:59.28	
7	Nebyat Abraham	Eritrea	17:15.20	
8	Elvanie Nimbona	Burundi	17:23.12	
9	Elisabet Mabiala Nkengue	Republic of the Congo	19:46.19	
10	Bibiro Ali Taher	Chad	20:08.53	
	Sakat Lariba	Ghana	DNF	
	Khadija Sammah	Morocco	DNF	
	Stella Chesang	Uganda	DNF	
	Saïda El Mehdi	Morocco	DNS	
