= Dibate =

- Location within Ethiopia
- Coordinates: 10°39′N 36°13′E
- Country: Ethiopia
- Region: Benishangul-Gumuz
- Zone: Metekel Zone
- Elevation: 1,438 m (4,718 ft)

Population (2005)
  - Total: 5,010
- Time zone: UTC+3 (EAT)

Dibate is a town in western Ethiopia, named after a local tribe. Located in the Metekel Zone of Benishangul-Gumuz, Dibate has a latitude and longitude of 10°39′N 36°13′E with an elevation of 1438 meters above sea level.

Based on figures from the Central Statistical Agency in 2005, this town has an estimated total population of 5,010 of whom 2,354 were males and were 2,656 females. According to the 1994 national census, its total population was 2,912 of whom 1,362 were males and 1,550 were females. It is the largest settlement in Dibate woreda.
