= Beles River =

River in western Ethiopia

Coordinates: 10°54′N 35°16′E

Beles
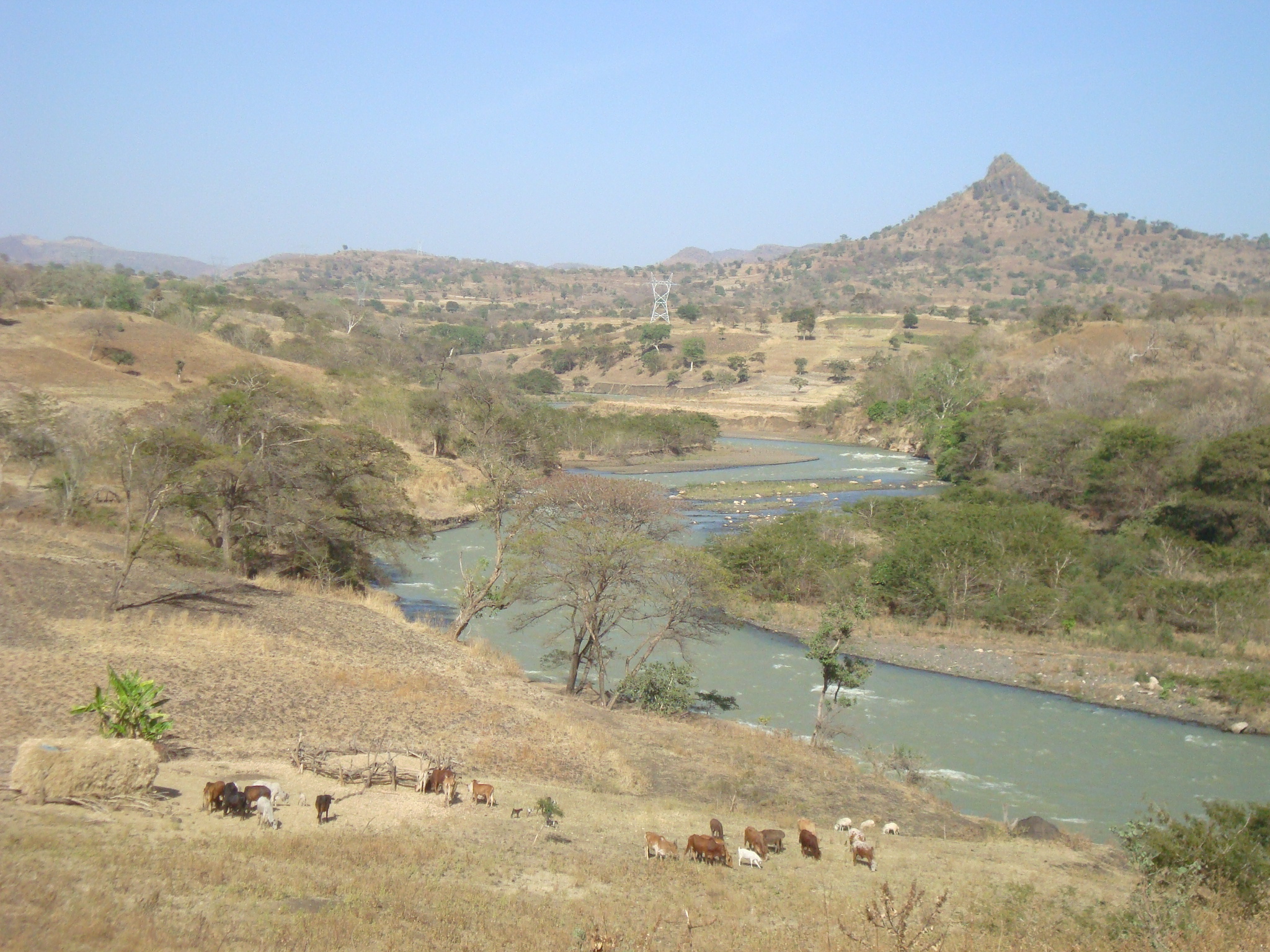

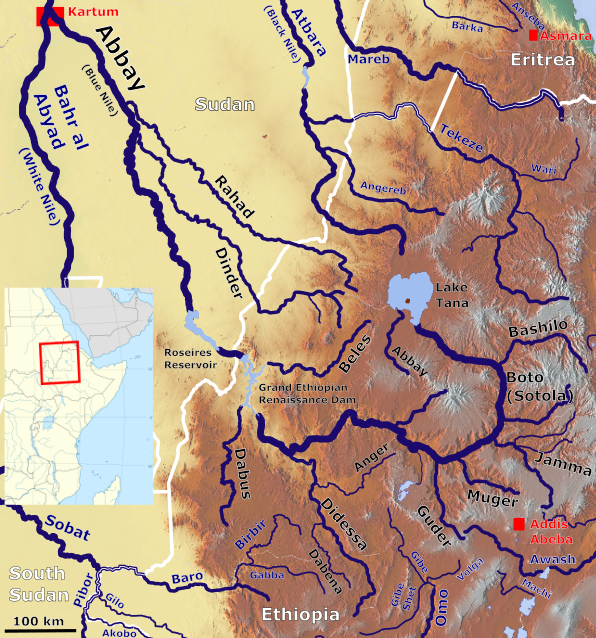
- Map showing the Abbay basin, with the Beles River (Centre)

Location
- Country: Ethiopia

Physical characteristics
- Source
  - location: 15 km (9.3 mi) west of Lake Tana
  - elevation: 2,100 m (6,900 ft)
- Mouth: Blue Nile
- Length: 350 km (220 mi)
- Basin size: 14,200 km^{2} (5,500 sq mi)

Basin features
- Progression: Blue Nile → Nile → Mediterranean Sea
- River system: Nile Basin

The Beles (Kusa in Gumuz language) is a river of western Ethiopia. The Beles, a tributary of the Abay River (Blue Nile), originates in Dangur woreda and flows southwest to its confluence. Its catchment area amounts to about 14,200 square kilometers.

== Course ==
The source is located 15 km west of Lake Tana at an elevation of 2,100 metres (6,900 ft) above sea level. The mouth of the river Beles in the Blue Nile is located about 40 km upstream of the Grand Ethiopian Renaissance dam that is under construction, and the water of the Beles will be used in the future.

== Transferred water from Lake Tana ==
Since the Tana Beles hydroelectric power plant has been put into operation in 2010, the Beles has received water from Lake Tana via the Tana-Beles interbasin transfer, which is to be used in a series of irrigation projects below the power plant. For this purpose a series of dams were built.

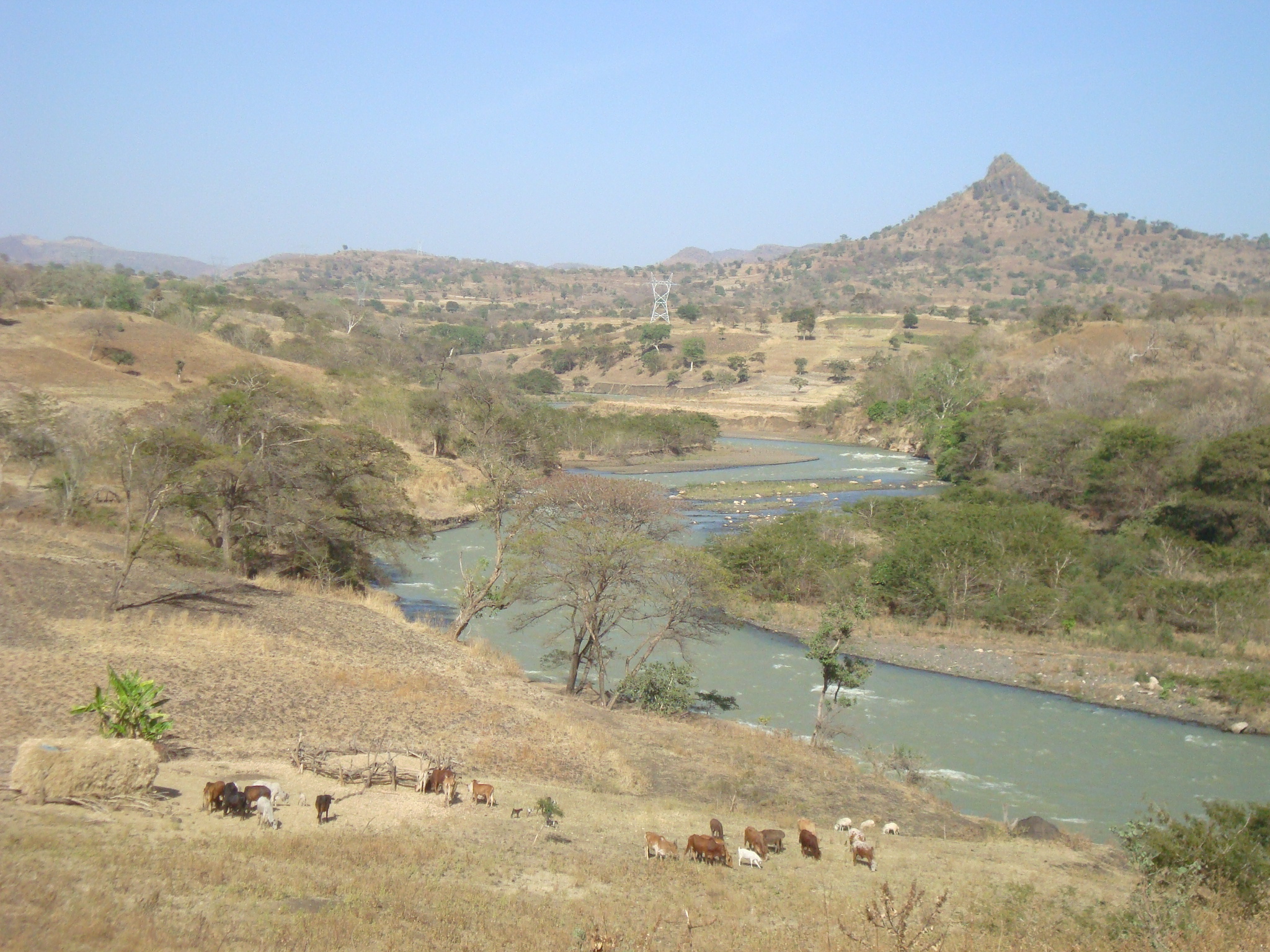
Beles River, after receiving the transferred water from Lake Tana

These large water transfers from Lake Tana to Beles River affect the movement of people, the hydrogeomorphology, and ecology of the river. The Environmental Impact Assessment of the Beles hydropower project is however considered a formality and is unfindable. The social impacts of the Tana-Beles water transfer have been studied and results published in the high-profile Journal of Hydrology: the dangerously high water discharge from the Beles River has resulted in the drowning of 250 people between 2010 and 2018. The negative impacts on rural livelihoods are however overshadowed by national development goals (electricity production). The external costs (coping with damage) are borne by local people, who have low bargaining power.

== See also ==
- Beles Hydroelectric Power Plant
