= Shinasha language =

North Omotic language spoken in western Ethiopia

Shinasha
- Borna
- Region: Ethiopia
- Ethnicity: Bora
- Native speakers: 36,000 (2007 census)
- Language family: Afro-Asiatic: Omotic; North; Gonga; Shinasha
- Dialects: Amuru; Wenbera; Gamila; Guba
- Writing system: Latin

Language codes
- ISO 639-3: bwo
- Glottolog: boro1277
- ELP: Boró

Shinasha, also known as Boro (Borna, Bworo) is a North Omotic language spoken in western Ethiopia by the Shinasha people. Its speakers live in scattered areas north of the Abay River: in the Dangur, Bullen, Dibate and Wenbera districts, which are parts of the Benishangul-Gumuz Region.
