= Journal of Hydrology =

- Discipline: Hydrological Sciences
- Language: English
- Edited by: E.N. Anagnostou, A. Bárdossy, M. Borga, L. Charlet, C. Corradini, K.P. Georgakakos, P.K. Kitanidis, T.R. McVicar, G. Syme

Publication details
- Publisher: Elsevier
- Frequency: Monthly
- Impact factor: 6.708 (2021)

Standard abbreviations
- ISO 4: J. Hydrol.

Indexing
- ISSN: 0022-1694

Links
- Journal homepage

Journal of Hydrology (ISSN 0022-1694) is a peer-reviewed academic journal published by Elsevier about hydrological sciences including water based management and related policy issues.
