= Gumuz people =

Nilotic ethnic group in Ethiopia and Sudan

Gumuz
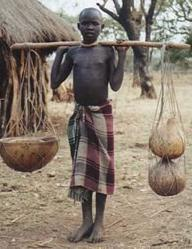

Total population
- 250,000

Regions with significant populations
- Ethiopia: 159,418
- Sudan: 88,000

Languages
- Gumuz

Religion
- Predominately traditional faith; minority Christianity, Islam

Related ethnic groups
- Gule, Kwama, Shita, Uduk, Komo

The Gumuz (also spelled Gumaz and Gumz) are an ethnic group speaking a Nilo-Saharan language inhabiting the Benishangul-Gumuz Region in western Ethiopia, as well as the Fazogli region in Sudan. They speak the Gumuz language, which belongs to the Nilo-Saharan family. In 2025, the population of Gumuz people was around 250,000 people.

== History ==
Flag of the Benishangul-Gumuz Region.

The Gumuz have traditionally been grouped with other Nilotic peoples living along the Sudanese-Ethiopian border under the collective name Shanqella (Pankhurst 1977). As "Shanquella", they are already mentioned by Scottish explorer James Bruce in his Travels to Discover the Source of the Nile, published in 1790. He notes that they hunted with bows and arrows, a custom that survives today.

Most Gumuz members live in a bush-savanna lowland environment. According to their traditions, in earlier times they inhabited the western parts of the province of Gojjam, but were progressively banished to the inhospitable area of the Blue Nile and its tributaries by their more powerful Afroasiatic-speaking neighbors, the Amhara and Agaw, who also enslaved them (Wolde-Selassie Abbute 2004). Slavery did not disappear in Ethiopia until the 1940s. Descendants of Gumuz people taken as slaves to the area just south of Welkite were found to still be speaking the language in 1984 (Unseth 1985).

== Language ==
The Gumuz speak the Gumuz language, which belongs to the Nilo-Saharan family (Bender 1979). It is subdivided in several dialects (Ahland 2004, Unseth 1985).

== Demographics ==
As of 2025, there were 159,418 Gumuz people living in Ethiopia, and around 88,000 in Sudan.

The total Gumuz population was around 250,000 people in 2025.

== Culture ==
The Gumuz practice shifting cultivation and their staple food is sorghum (Wallmark 1981). Cereal crops are kept in granaries decorated with clay lumps imitating female breasts. Sorghum is used for cooking porridge (nga) and brewing beer (kea). All the cooking and brewing is carried out in earthen pots, which are made by women. The Gumuz also hunt wild animals, such as duikers and warthogs, and gather honey, wild fruits, roots and seeds. Those living near the Sudanese borderland converted to Islam and a few are Christians, but most Gumuz still maintain traditional religious practices. Spirits are called mus'a and are thought to dwell in houses, granaries, fields, trees and mountains. They have ritual specialists called gafea. Originally, all Gumuz adorned their bodies with scarifications, but this custom is disappearing through government pressure and education. All Gumuz are organized in clans. Feuds between clans are common and they are usually solved by means of an institution of conflict resolution, called mangema or michu depending on the region. As it used to be among the Sudanese Uduk, marriage is through sister exchange.

== Conflict with highland settlers ==
Many changes occurred for the Gumuz people from the 1980s through to the 2010s. There was resettlement of highlanders to their area, particularly linked to the availability of land and water. An example is that settlers were attracted to a large irrigation project along the Kusa. Often the Gumuz' lands were allocated to transnational or domestic investors. In several parts of the Gumuz area, the settlers' economy dominated by 2018. Many Gumuz became sedentary while continuing their agricultural system. Though a transit road has been built and commercial farms established in the lower basin the Gumuz people were seen in 2018 as politically "peripheral" in regard to the Ethiopian highlands that hold the power in the country.

In the Metekel conflict, starting in 2019, Gumuz militia were allegedly involved in attacks against Amhara, Agaw, Oromo and Shinasha civilians.

== Bibliography ==
- Abbute, Wolde-Selassie. 2004. Gumuz and Highland resettlers. Differing strategies of livelihood and ethnic relations in Metekel, Northwestern Ethiopia. Münster: Lit.
- Ahland, Colleen Anne. 2004. Linguistic variation within Gumuz: a study of the relationship between historical change and intelligibility. M.A. thesis. University of Texas at Arlington.
- Ahmad, Abdussamad H. 1995. The Gumuz of the Lowlands of Western Gojjam: The frontier in History 1900-1935. Africa 50(1): 53-67.
- Ahmad, Abdussamad H. 1999. Trading in slaves in Bela-Shangul and Gumuz, Ethiopia: border enclaves in history, 1897-1938. Journal of African History 40(3): 433-446.
- Bender, M. Lionel. 1979. Gumuz: a sketch of grammar and lexicon. Afrika und Übersee 62: 38-69.
- Bender, M. Lionel. 1994. Comparative Komuz grammar. Afrika und Übersee 77: 31-54.
- Grottanelli, Vinigi, L. 1948. I Preniloti: un’arcaica provincia culturale in Africa. Annali Lateranensi 12: 280-326.
- Haberland, Eike. 1953. Über einen unbekannten Gunza-stamm in Wallegga. Rassegna di Studi Etiopici 12: 139-148.
- James, Wendy. 1975. Sister exchange marriage. Scientific American 233(6): 84-94.
- James, Wendy. 1980. “From aboriginal to frontier society in western Ethiopia. In Working papers on society and history in Imperial Ethiopia: The southern periphery from 1880 to 1974, edited by Donald L. Donham and Wendy James. Cambridge: African Studies Center, Cambridge University Press.
- James, Wendy. 1986. “Lifelines: exchange marriage among the Gumuz”. In The southern marches of Imperial Ethiopia. Essays in history and social anthropology, edited by D.L. Donham and W. James. Cambridge: Cambridge University Press: 119-147.
- Klausberger, Friedrich. 1975. Bashanga, das Strafrecht der Baga-Gumuz. Ethnologische Zeitschrift (Zürich) 1: 109-126.
- Pankhurst, Richard. 1977. The history of Bareya, Sanquella and other Ethiopian slaves from the borderlands of the Sudan. Sudan Notes and Records 58: 1-43.
- Simmoons, Frederick. 1958. The agricultural implements and cutting tools of Begemder and Semyen, Ethiopia. South West Journal of Anthropology 14: 386-406.
- Unseth, Peter. 1985. Gumuz: a dialect survey report. Journal of Ethiopian Studies 18: 91-114.
- Unseth, Peter. 1989. Selected aspects of Gumuz phonology. Proceedings of the 8th International Conference on Ethiopian Studies, Addis Ababa, 1984: 617-32.
- Uzar, Henning. 1993. “Studies in Gumuz: Sese phonology and TMA system”. In Topics in Nilo-Saharan linguistics, edited by M.L. Bender. Hamburg: Helmut Buske: 347-383.
- Wallmark, Peter. 1981. “The Bega (Gumuz) of Wellega: Agriculture and subsistence”. In Peoples and cultures of the Ethio-Sudan borderlands, edited by M.L. Bender. East Lansing: Michigan State University, African Studies Centre: 79-116.
- Zanni, Leone. 1939-40. La Tribù dei Gumus. Note Etnografiche. La Nigrizia. Verona.
