= Metekel Zone =

Region in Benishangul-Gumuz region of Ethiopia

Coordinates: 11°00′N 35°45′E

Map of the regions and zones of Ethiopia

Metekel Zone (Amharic: መተከል ዞን) is located in the current Benishangul-Gumuz region of Ethiopia. It is bordered on the south and southwest by Kamashi, on the west by Sudan, and on the north and east by the Amhara region. The Abay River which formerly defined the western border of Gojjam, defines the Zone's boundaries with Kamashi, while the Dinder River defines part of its boundary with the Amhara region.

The administrative center of Metekel Zone is Gilgil Beles; other towns include Manbuk. The highest point is Mount Belaya (3,131 meters), which is part of the Dangur range.

MIDROC Gold reported in 2009 that it was exploring the Zone for gold deposits.

== Demographics ==
Based on the 2007 Census conducted by the Central Statistical Agency of Ethiopia (CSA), this Zone has a total population of 276,367, of whom 139,119 are men and 137,248 women. 37,615 or 13.61% of population are urban inhabitants. A total of 58,515 households were counted in this Zone, which results in an average of 4.72 persons to a household, and 56,734 housing units. The five largest ethnic groups reported in the Metekel Zone were the Gumuz (36.8%), the oromo (11.09%), the Shinasha (21.6%), the Awi (11.33%), a subgroup of the Agew, and the Amhara (17.39%); all other ethnic groups made up 1.81% of the population. Main languages are Gumuz (36.31%), Amharic (34.21%), Oromo (19.89%), Shinasha (12.81%) and Awngi (10.91%). Amharic is spoken as a first language by 24% of the population and as a second language by another 10%. The majority of the inhabitants practiced Ethiopian Orthodox Christianity, with 54.49% of the population reporting that they held that belief, while 20.31% were Muslim, 17.65% observed traditional religions, and 6.36% were Protestant, source Keneni JIbat ,2020, Addis Ababa university.

According to a May 24, 2004 World Bank memorandum, 8% of the inhabitants of Metekel have access to electricity, this zone has a road density of 28.4 kilometers per 1000 square kilometers, the average rural household has 1.4 hectare of land (compared to the national average of 1.01 hectare of land and an average of 2.25 for pastoral regions) and the equivalent of 0.6 heads of livestock. 10% of the population is in non-farm related jobs, compared to the national average of 25% and an average of 28% for pastoral regions. 93% of all eligible children are enrolled in primary school, and 25% in secondary schools. 68% of the zone is exposed to malaria, and 100% to Tsetse fly. The memorandum gave this zone a drought risk rating of 433.

The Metekel conflict began in 2019. A massacre occurred on 23 December 2020.
