= Shinasha people =

Ethnic group in northwestern Ethiopia

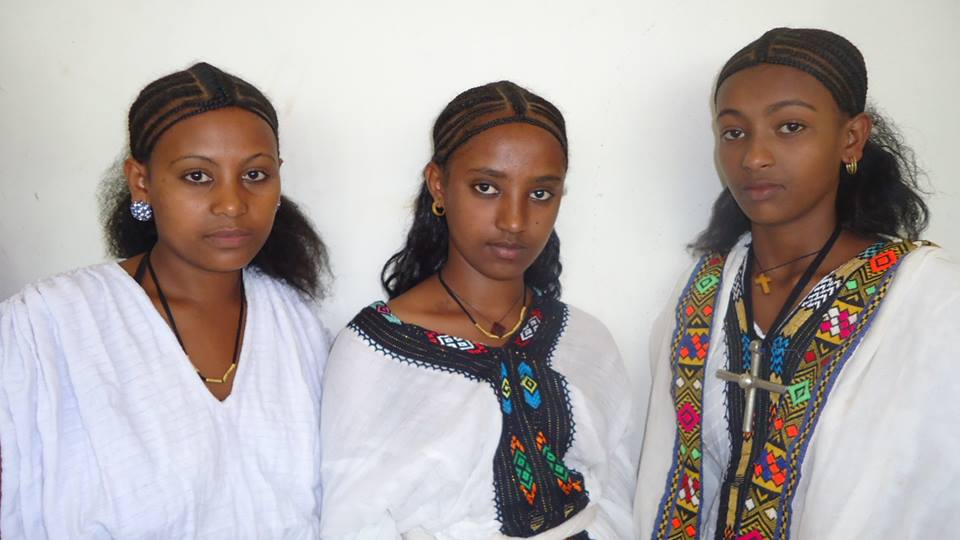
- Shinasha women in traditional clothes and hairstyle

Total population
- 139,000

Languages
- Shinasha

Religion
- Christianity (EOTC)

Related ethnic groups
- Kafficho

The Shinasha, also known as Bworo or Boro, are an ethnic group in northwestern Ethiopia. Their language belongs to the North Omotic family (see Omotic languages). They live north of the Blue Nile in the Metekel Zone of the Benishangul-Gumuz Region and number around 139,000 individuals. Their neighbors in the area include Gumuz, Amhara, Awi and Oromo peoples.

Oscar T. Crosby encountered a group of 600 Shinasha in 1901, living in "a few villages between the Durra and Wombera [rivers]." He described their houses and dress, and claimed that they made their living through "claiming great powers of necromancy, by menace of rain or drought, they force the Shankalis to yield up to them a part of their scanty store of grain, or meat, or honey."

In 2017, Bahir Dar University conducted a study of the Shinasha people's unique usage of a number of indigenous tuberous plants as food and herbal medicine. In the study, the Shinasha's main livelihood is described as subsistence farming, by plowing the land and raising animals.
