= Blue Nile =

Major river flowing across Ethiopia and Sudan

Blue Nile Abay
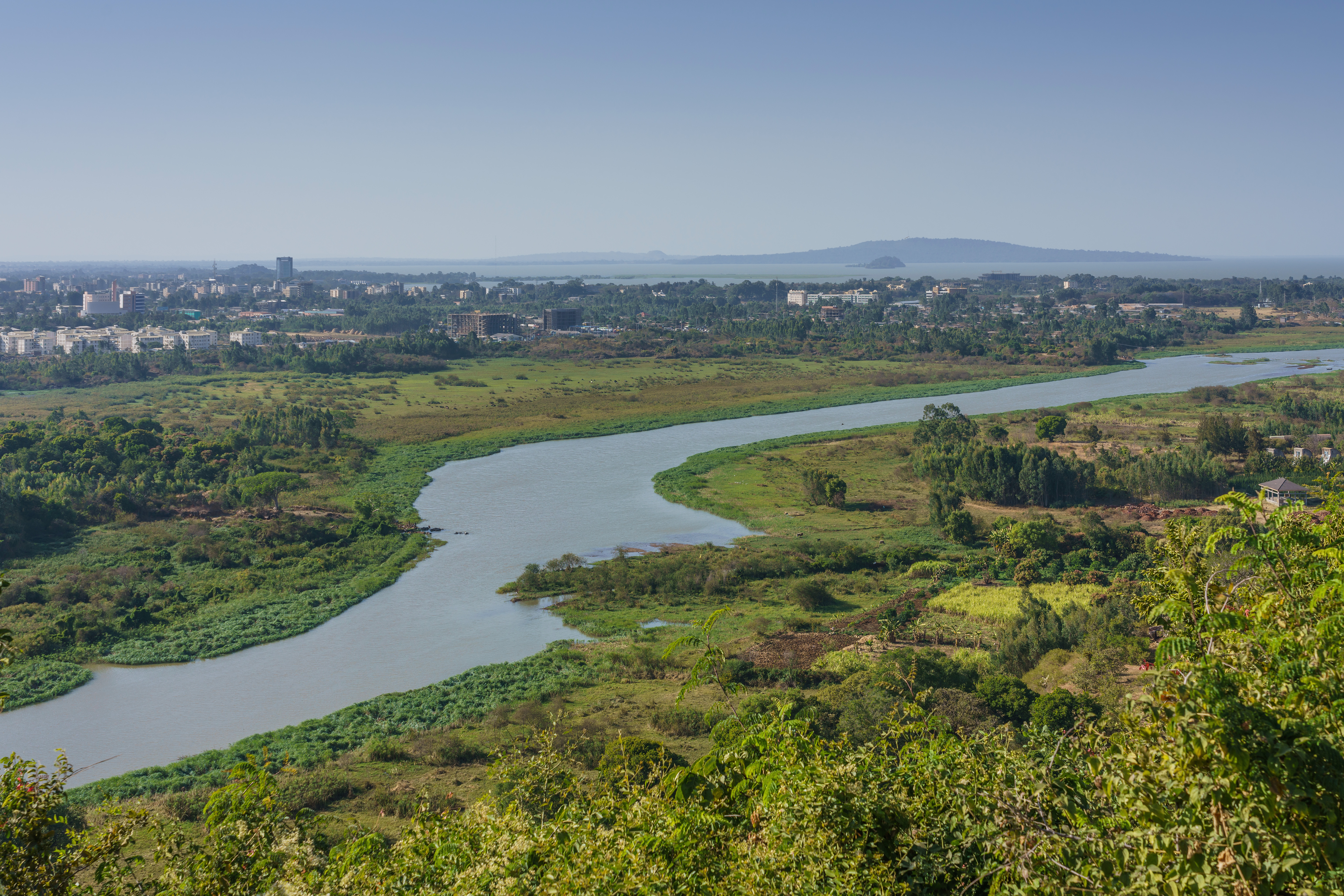
- Blue Nile River in Ethiopia

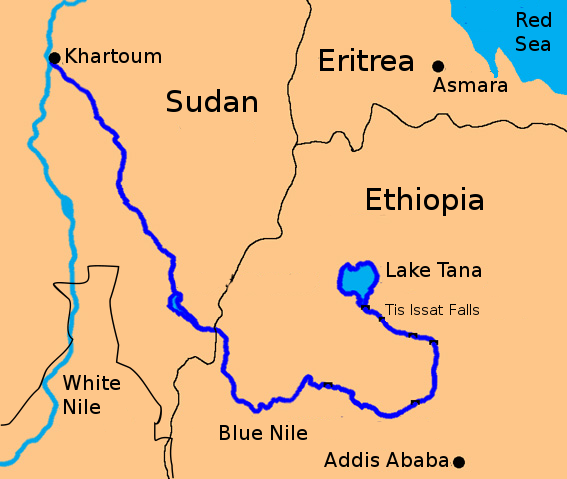

Location
- Countries: Ethiopia, Sudan

Physical characteristics
- Source
  - location: Gish Abay at Sekela, Ethiopia
  - coordinates: 11°00′07″N 37°13′30″E
  - elevation: 2,560 m (8,400 ft)
- Mouth: Nile River
  - location: Khartoum, Sudan
  - coordinates: 15°38′31″N 32°30′18″E
  - elevation: 373 m (1,224 ft)
- Length: 1,450 km (900 mi)
- Basin size: 325,000 km^{2} (125,000 sq mi)
- Discharge
  - average: 1,548 m^{3}/s (54,700 cu ft/s)

Basin features
- Progression: Nile → Mediterranean Sea
- River system: Nile
- Tributaries
  - left: Bashilo, Walaqa, Jamma, Muger, Guder, Gulla, Didessa, Dabus
  - right: Beles, Dinder, Rahad

The Blue Nile (Note: Amharic: ጥቁር አባይ, romanized: t’ikʼuri ābayi; Oromo: Mormor or Abbayaa, lit. 'father of streams'; Arabic: النيل الأزرق, romanized: an-Nīl al-ʾAzraqu) is a river originating at Lake Tana in Ethiopia. It travels for approximately 1,450 km (900 mi) through Ethiopia and Sudan. Along with the White Nile, it is one of the two major tributaries of the Nile and supplies about 85.6% of the water to the Nile during the rainy season.

== Course ==
The distance of the river from its source to its confluence has been variously reported between 1,460 and 1,600 kilometres (910 and 990 mi). This uncertainty might result from the fact that the river flows through a series of virtually impenetrable gorges cut in the Ethiopian Highlands to a depth of some 1,500 metres (4,900 ft). According to materials published by the Central Statistical Agency, an Ethiopian government agency, the Blue Nile has a total length of 1,450 kilometres (900 mi), of which 800 kilometres (500 mi) are inside Ethiopia.

=== In Ethiopia ===
The Blue Nile originates at Gish Abay at Sekela in Ethiopia (where it is called the Abay River). The river flows generally south before entering a canyon about 400 km (250 mi) long, about 30 km (19 mi) from Lake Tana, which is a tremendous obstacle for travel and communication between north and south Ethiopia. The canyon was first referred to as the "Grand Canyon" in 1968 by a British team that accomplished the first descent of the river from Lake Tana to the end of the canyon; subsequent river rafting parties called it the "Grand Canyon of the Nile". The Blue Nile Falls (Amharic: Tis Abay, literally "great smoke"), one of Ethiopia's biggest tourist attractions, is located at the start of the canyon.

The river loops across northwest Ethiopia before being fed by numerous tributaries between Lake Tana and the Ethiopia–Sudan border. Those on its left bank, in downstream order, include the Wanqa River, the Bashilo River, the Walaqa River, the Wanchet River, the Jamma River, the Muger River, the Guder River, the Agwel River, the Nedi River, the Didessa River and the Dabus River. Those on the right side, also in downstream order, include the Handassa, Tul, Abaya, Sade, Tammi, Cha, Shita, Suha, Muga, Gulla, Temcha, Bachat, Katlan, Jiba, Chamoga, Weter and the Beles.

=== In Sudan ===
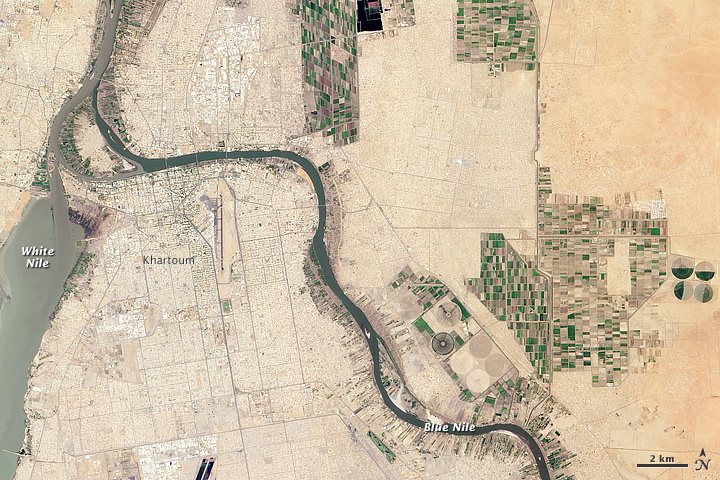
Satellite image of where White and Blue Niles merge

The Blue Nile then heads northwest into Sudan. It travels for approximately 650 km (400 mi), flowing past Er Roseires and receiving the Dinder River on its right bank at Dinder. At Khartoum, the Blue Nile joins the White Nile and, as the Nile, flows through Egypt to the Mediterranean Sea at Alexandria.

== Water flow ==
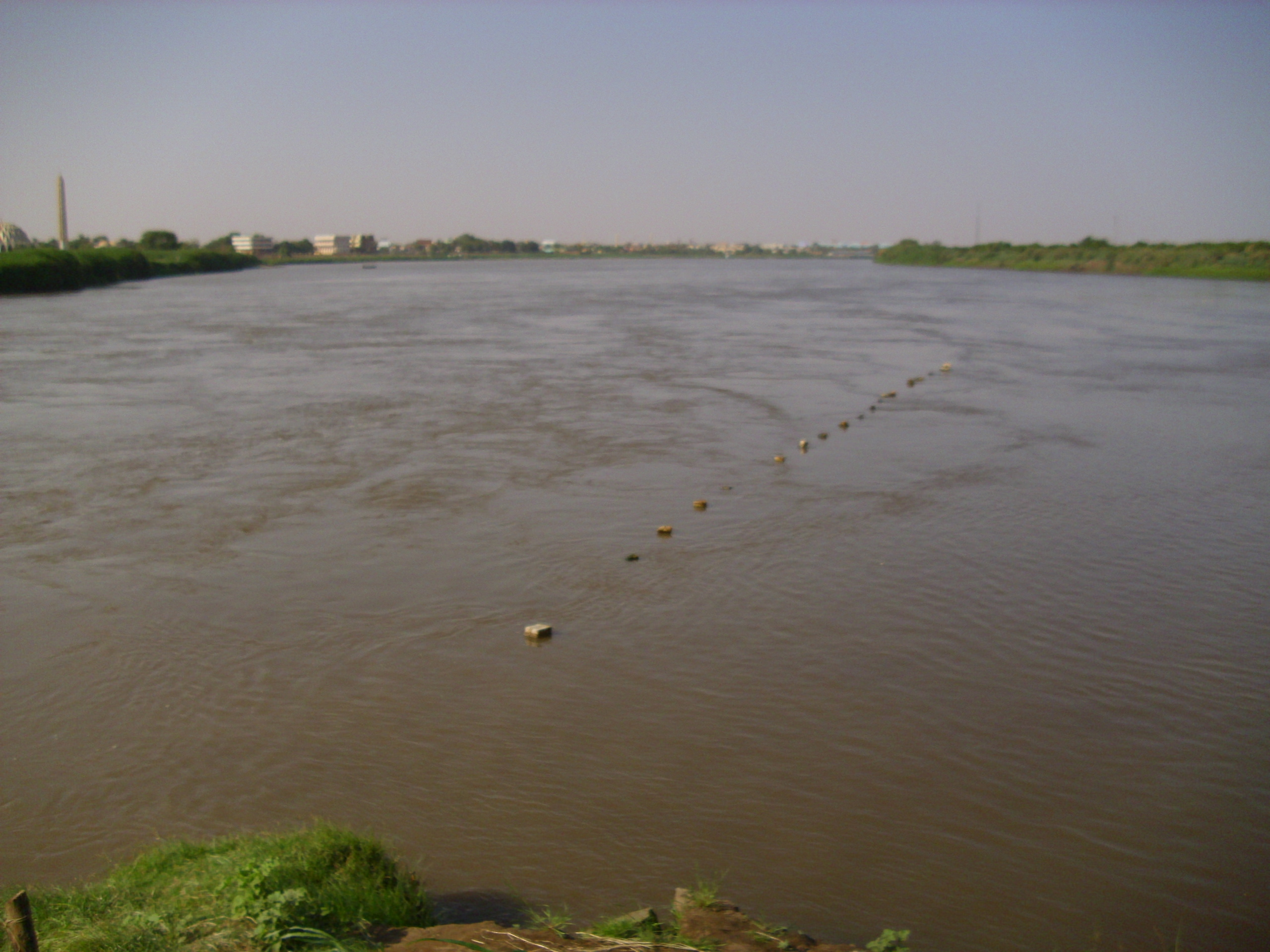
Confluence of the Blue and White Nile rivers near Khartoum, the capital of Sudan

The flow of the Blue Nile reaches maximum volume in the rainy season from June to September, when it supplies 80–86% of the water of the Nile proper. The river was a major source of the flooding of the Nile in Egypt that contributed to the fertility of the Nile Valley and the consequent rise of Ancient Egypt and Egyptian mythology. With the completion of the Aswan Dam in 1970, these floods stopped occurring in lower Egypt. During the summer monsoon season, the Blue Nile floods erode a vast amount of fertile soil from the Ethiopian Highlands and carry it downstream as silt, turning the water dark brown or almost black.

The Blue Nile is vital to the livelihood of Egypt: as the most significant tributary of the Nile, it contributes over 85% of the Nile's streamflow. Though shorter than the White Nile, 59% of the water that reaches Egypt originates from the Ethiopian highlands via the Blue Nile. The river is also an important resource for Sudan, where the Roseires Dam and Sennar Dam contribute to the 80% of the country's electricity generation from hydropower. These dams also help irrigate the Gezira Scheme, which is most famous for its high-quality cotton, as well as wheat and animal feed crop production in the area.

In November 2012, Ethiopia began construction of the Grand Ethiopian Renaissance Dam, a 6000-megawatt hydroelectric dam on the river. The dam is expected to be a boost for the Ethiopian economy. Sudan and Egypt, however, voiced their concerns over a potential reduction in water available. Electricity generation began in February 2022.

== History ==
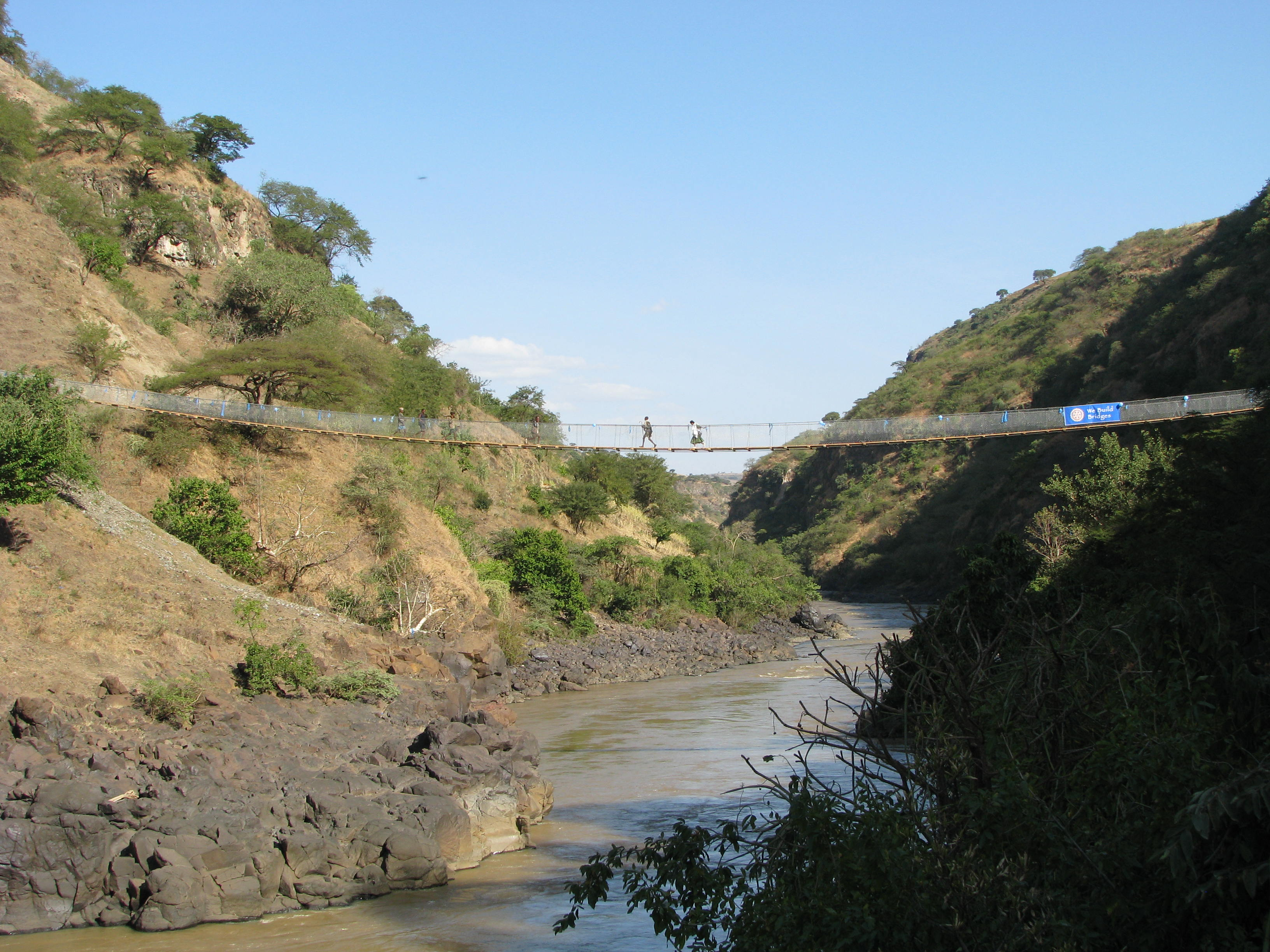
Suspension bridge over the Blue Nile River. It is the only pedestrian cable bridge over the Blue Nile in Ethiopia.

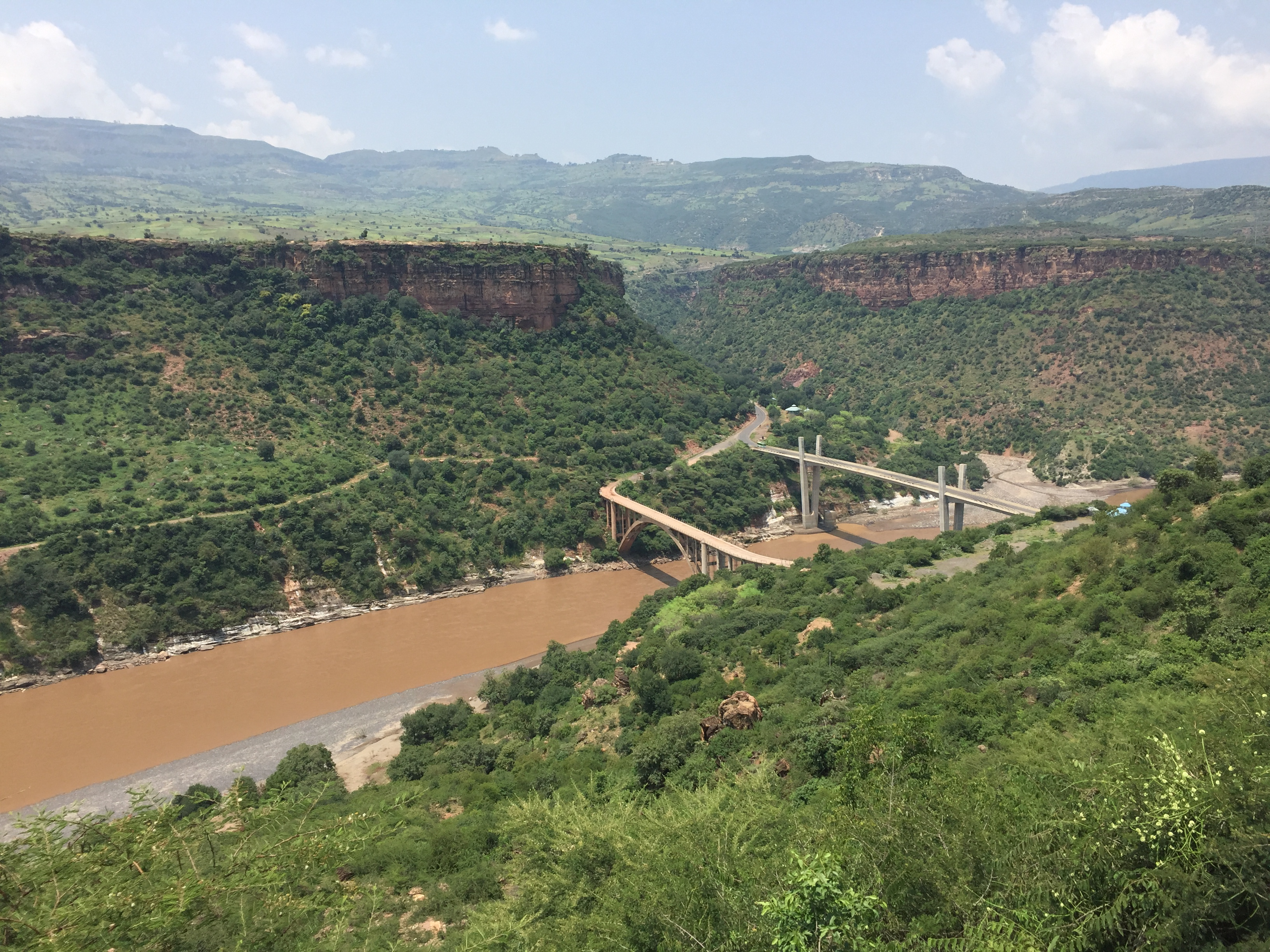
Blue Nile Gorge in Ethiopia.

The Egyptian fear that Ethiopia might block the Blue Nile was a major factor in the long and complex Ethiopian-Egyptian relationship. While Egypt relied on Ethiopia for its waters, Ethiopia depended on the Coptic Orthodox Patriarchate of Alexandria for patriarchal authority and the appointment of its metropolitan. This interdependence has shaped events since the 11th century. For centuries, the threat of blocking the Blue Nile was an effective strategy in ensuring the appointment of Egyptian metropolitans. However, in practice, neither a diversion nor large-scale use of the river's waters was ever attempted.

An early crisis emerged during the reign of Zagwe King Gebre Mesqel Lalibela, whom the Egyptians suspected of attempting to divert the river, even though his kingdom never extended to the Blue Nile. It was Emperor Amda Seyon I who first occupied the Blue Nile basin and began spreading Christianity there.

The Emperors of the Solomonic dynasty, particularly Dawit II, Yeshaq I, and Zara Yaqob, continued asserting Ethiopia's control over the river as a diplomatic tool. They also reinforced this concept in religious terms, identifying the Blue Nile with the biblical Gihon and adapting the Tammera Maryam to legitimize their authority over the waters. Medieval European myths about a powerful Christian Ethiopia aiding in the destruction of Islam further elevated the significance of the Blue Nile in Ethio-Egyptian relations.

The first European known to have seen the Blue Nile in Ethiopia and the river's source was Pedro Páez, a Spanish Jesuit who reached the river's source on 21 April 1618. However, the Portuguese João Bermudes, the self-described "Patriarch of Ethiopia", provided the first description of the Tis Abay River Falls in his memoirs published in 1565, and any number of Europeans who lived in Ethiopia in the late 15th century such as Pêro da Covilhã could have seen the river long before Páez, but not reached its source. The source of the Nile proper was also reached in 1629 by the Portuguese Jesuit missionary Jerónimo Lobo and in 1770 by the Scottish explorer James Bruce.

Although European explorers contemplated tracing the course of the Nile from the Blue Nile's confluence with the White Nile to Lake Tana, the Blue Nile Canyon has discouraged all attempts since Frédéric Cailliaud's attempt in 1821. The first serious attempt by a non-local to explore this reach of the river was undertaken by the American W.W. Macmillan in 1902, assisted by the Norwegian explorer B.H. Jenssen; Jenssen proceeded upriver from Khartoum while Macmillan sailed downstream from Lake Tana. However, Jenssen's boats were blocked by the rapids at Famaka short of the Sudan-Ethiopia border, and Macmillan's boats were wrecked shortly after they had been launched. Macmillan encouraged Jenssen to try to sail upstream from Khartoum again in 1905, but he was forced to stop 500 km (300 mi) short of Lake Tana. Robert Cheesman, who records his surprise on arriving in Ethiopia at finding that the upper waters of "one of the most famous of the rivers of the world, and one whose name was well known to the ancients" was in his lifetime "marked on the map by dotted lines", managed to map the upper course of the Blue Nile between 1925 and 1933. He did this not by following the river along its banks and through its impassable canyon but by following it from the highlands above, travelling some 8,000 km (5,000 mi) by mule in the adjacent country.

In the 1950s and 1960s, several kayakers paddled parts of the canyon. In 1968, at the request of Haile Selassie, a team of 60 British and Ethiopian servicemen and scientists made the first full descent of the river from Lake Tana to a point near the Sudanese border led by explorer John Blashford-Snell. The team used specially-built Avon Inflatables and modified Royal Engineers assault boats to navigate the formidable rapids. Subsequent rafting expeditions in the 1970s and 1980s generally only covered parts of the river canyon.

In 1999, writer Virginia Morell and photographer Nevada Wier made the journey by raft from Lake Tana to Sudan, publishing a documentary about their journey afterwards. In 2000, American and National Geographic reader, Kenneth Frantz, saw a photo taken by Nevada Wier for National Geographic which would lead him to found the charity Bridges to Prosperity. This photo showed a bridge broken during World War II, with 10 men on either side of the broken span pulling each other across the dangerous gap by rope. This historic bridge was built by Emperor Fasilides in approximately 1660 with Roman bridge technology brought to Ethiopia by Portuguese soldiers during the battle with the Muslim invaders in 1507. In both 2001 and 2009, Bridges to Prosperity volunteers travelled from the United States to repair the broken bridge across the Blue Nile and later built a new suspension bridge not susceptible to flood.

On 28 April 2004, geologist Pasquale Scaturro and his partner, kayaker and documentary filmmaker Gordon Brown, became the first known people to navigate the Blue Nile in its entirety. Though their expedition included several others, Brown and Scaturro were the only ones to remain on the expedition for the entire journey. They chronicled their adventure with an IMAX camera and two handheld video cameras, sharing their story in the film Mystery of the Nile and in a book of the same title.

On 29 January 2005, Canadian Les Jickling and his teammate New Zealander Mark Tanner completed the first fully human-powered transit of the entire Blue Nile and the Nile in the Sudan and Egypt. Their journey of over 5,000 km (3,100 mi) took five months and travelled through Ethiopia, Sudan, and Egypt. They recount that they paddled through civil war conflict zones, regions known for bandits, and encountered multiple hazards and rapids.

== See also ==
- List of rivers of Ethiopia
- List of rivers of Sudan
