= Shabo =

Shabo may refer to:

- Shabo language; language of southwestern Ethiopia
- Shabo people; ethnic group in southwestern Ethiopia
- Shabo, Ukraine;
- Shabo rural hromada in Odesa Oblast, Ukraine
- Shabo, Kale, Myanmar.
- Shabo station, station of Shenzhen Metro in China
- Haim Shabo (born 1973), former Israeli footballer
- Julius Abdulahad Gallo Shabo (born 1951), archbishop for the Syriac Orthodox Archdiocese of Sweden and Scandinavia
