= Kadallu language =

Gumuz language spoken in Sudan

Kadallu
- Native to: Sudan
- Region: Ad-Damazin
- Ethnicity: Gumuz
- Language family: Nilo-Saharan?: Komuz?; Bʼaga; Kadallu

Language codes
- ISO 639-3: None (mis)
- Glottolog: None

Kadallu is a poorly attested Gumuz language of southeastern Sudan. It is known only from two short word lists. It is spoken on the Blue Nile in the southeastern corner of Sudan, in the area surrounding Ad-Damazin and Er Roseires, and just south-southeast of (across the river from) Famaka near the Ethiopian border.

Dimmendaal et al. note that "Kadallu (Kadalo) is a language spoken in the Republic of Sudan which is currently listed as an alternate name for Gumuz in the Ethnologue (Simons and Fennig 2017). However, from examining existing word lists (Schuver 1882 in James et al. 1996, Muratori 1955) we suspect that Kadallu is a distinct language." The short list of words collected by Juan Maria Schuver was recently published along with Schuver's papers concerning his travels along the Sudan-Ethiopia border.
