= Komo language =

Nilo-Saharan language spoken in northeast Africa

Komo
- Go-kwom, Tta Komo
- Native to: Sudan, South Sudan, Ethiopia
- Region: North of Gambella Region, across the Ethiopia–South Sudan border
- Native speakers: (10,000 in Sudan cited 1979); 8,500 in Ethiopia (2007 census)
- Language family: Nilo-Saharan?: Komuz?; Koman; Central Koman; Komo–Uduk; Komo

Language codes
- ISO 639-3: xom
- Glottolog: komo1258
- ELP: Komo
- Komo is classified as Definitely Endangered by the UNESCO Atlas of the World's Languages in Danger.

Komo is a Nilo-Saharan language spoken by the Kwama (Komo) people of Ethiopia, Sudan and South Sudan. It is a member of the Koman languages. The language is also referred to as Madiin, Koma, South Koma, Central Koma, Gokwom and Hayahaya. Many individuals from Komo are multilingual because they are in close proximity to Mao, Kwama and Oromo speakers. Komo is closely related to Kwama, a language spoken by a group who live in the same region of Ethiopia and who also identify themselves as ethnically Komo. Some Komo and Kwama speakers recognize the distinction between the two languages and culture, whereas some people see it as one "ethnolinguistic" community. The 2007 Ethiopian census makes no mention of Kwama, and for this reason its estimate of 8,000 Komo speakers may be inaccurate. An older estimate from 1971 places the number of Komo speakers in Ethiopia at 1,500. The Komo language is greatly understudied; more information is being revealed as researchers are discovering more data about other languages within the Koman family.

== History ==
Many individuals from Komo are multilingual because they are in close proximity to Mao, Kwama, and Oromo speakers. "Komo and Mao" were ethnically and linguistically ambiguous terms until they became the official terms used in the Asosa zone in Benishangul Gummuz. Although Komo and Kwama are recognized under two different branches of Proto-Koman, there has been continuous debates and confusion over the ethnic identity of the two speech varieties.

== Geography ==
In Ethiopia, most speakers are located in the Benishangul-Gumuz Region, specifically in the Mao-Komo special woreda however there are also some in the Gambela Region. In Sudan it can be found in the state of An Nil al Azraq and in South Sudan, the Upper Nile State. Other Koman Languages, which are all spoken along the borders of Ethiopia, Sudan and South Sudan, are Uduk, Opuo, and Gwama, as well as a possible extinct Koman language, Gule. However, there is some debate whether Gwama and Komo are two separate languages or two dialects of the same language, this confusion comes from the fact that Gwama may also be known as "Kwama" or the word may be the Gwama language word referring to the Komo language; while researchers do not agree on this point, they definitively agree that more research is needed on this subject.

The majority of research on Komo takes place in Ethiopia.

== Phonology ==
Two phonological surveys of Komo have been published, with some degree of disagreement between the two. The data below is from the more recent of the two, published in 2006.

=== Consonants ===
The following table provides a summary of the consonants found in Komo.

		Bilabial		Alveolar		Palatal	Velar		Glottal
		plain	ejective	plain	ejective	Palatal	plain	ejective	Glottal
Stop	voiceless	p	p’	t	t’		k	k’	ʔ
Stop	voiced	b		d			g		
Stop	implosive			ɗ					
Fricative	voiceless	f		s	s’	ʃ			h
Fricative	voiced			z					
Nasal		m		n		(ɲ)	ŋ		
Rhotic				r					
Approximant	plain					j	w		
Approximant	lateral			l					

The voiced alveolar implosive [ɗ] does not occur word finally in Komo, and the velar nasal [ŋ] does not occur word initially. There have been cases of a palatal nasal [ɲ] and an alveolar trill [r] occurring word medially, however these are not considered distinct phonemes but rather the result of phonological processes.

Consonant gemination is common word medially in Komo, however is not phonologically significant and therefore optional. It is not allowed word initially or finally.

Consonant clusters are only allowed word medially in Komo, and can include a maximum of two consonants.

=== Vowels ===
The following table provides a summary of the phonemic vowels found in Komo.

	Front	Central	Back
High	i, ɪ		u, ʊ
Mid	ɛ		ɔ
Low		a	

Komo displays a contrastive seven-vowel inventory /i, ɪ, ɛ, a, ɔ, u/ with Advanced Tongue Root [ATR] contrast in the high vowels and a typologically unusual and unattested ATR harmony system. The first process is anticipatory, a [+high, +ATR] vowel /i, u/ causes a preceding [-high, -ATR] vowel /ɛ, a, ɔ/ to assimilate to [+ATR] and surface as the allophones [e, ə, o] respectively. The second process is progressive and a [+high, -ATR] vowel /ɪ, ʊ/ causes a following [+high, +ATR] vowel to surface as [+ATR]. Vowel length is not phonologically significant in Komo.

=== Tone ===
Tone also plays an important role in Komo. There are 3 tone levels in Komo, low (L), medium (M) and high (H). Tone plays a role in verbal morphology. The majority of verbal roots in Komo are monosyllabic at one of the three tones, and when inflected with a single argument they display a pattern of tonal melody. Depending on the class of verb, the tone of the root verb may change depending on the tone of the morphemes that attach to it in relation to its class

=== Syllables ===
Both codas and onsets are optional in Komo, therefore Komo allows the following syllable types:

- V
- CV
- VC
- CVC

== Orthography ==
An orthography for the Komo language has been conclusively constructed. It is based on the Latin alphabet.

Vowels: a, e, i, ɨ, o, u, ʉ

Consonants: p, b, pp, m, w, t, d, tt, dd, ss, z, n, r, l, sh, y, k, g, kk, h

In the orthography, the double consonants denote the ejective or implosive sounds. The "sh" letter combination denotes the palatal fricative.

== Grammar ==
The following is an overview of a grammar sketch of Komo. It is organized in a way that follows the structure of the language.

=== Nouns ===
A noun is referred to as a "zaga". A majority of nouns in the Komo language do not inherently express number. Most nouns have either a general singular or plural meaning. For instance:

- dog/dogs= kʼáw
- head/heads= k'up

Then there are certain nouns that are specifically either singular or plural:

- Man= yiba
- Girl= bamit
- People= giba

Komo nouns mainly distinguish gender in terms of masculine and feminine.

==== Number ====
The number in the Komo language correlates to the gender of the noun. As shown in the chart, singular nouns are preceded by an "a". The plural form of these nouns are in some cases preceded by "gu".

	Marker	Example
singular	a	a waga, a ton, kuman
plural	gu	gu waga, gu ton, gu kuman

==== Noun phrases ====
The order of elements in a noun phrase goes as follows: noun--modifying expression--numeral--demonstrative. This order cannot be altered, especially because numerals should not come before modifying expressions. The following sentence gives an example of a complete noun phrase:

- gʉ giba bbissina a dish ba (these three strong men)

=== Adjectives ===
Adjectives in the Komo language, as known as modifying expressions, are descriptive words that can be added to further define the noun. The adjectives describe particular qualities, such as the look, shape, sound, taste, or size, of the noun. In the Komo language, the adjectives appear after the noun they modify and agree with the gender and number of the noun. Below are a few examples of adjectives with the noun it modifies:

- paarsha basara – a beautiful horse
- she ppatana – a white tooth
- yi gwaz tʉlira – a tall boy

Pronouns are words or phrases that take the place of nouns. In the Komo language, there are eight different personal pronouns with four singular pronouns and four plural pronouns. The following chart displays the 8 personal pronouns:

Singular		Plural	
aka (payā)	I (ran)	ana/amʉn (payá, payan)	we (ran)
ay (payi)	you (ran)	ʉm (payim)	you (ran)
har/happ(payir, payipp)	he/she (ran)	hʉn (payin)	they (ran)

The Komo language also uses possessive pronouns to show ownership. Typically in a sentence structure, the word "ba" comes between the possessed noun and possessor noun. This particular word indicates to the reader that a relationship between two nouns is being described. For example:

- gubi ba bbamit (house of the woman)
- gʉ kura ba Asadik (Asadik's donkeys)

=== Verbs ===
In the Komo language, a verb or "kam yay" is the foundation or key basis in forming a proper sentence. A verb describes an action, state, process, event, or quality. In sentences, the verb agrees with the subjects. For example, a subject that is in the 1st person singular needs to have the verb follow in the 1st person singular.

The following chart displays a verb with markers for all the persons:

Aka unā pay	I will run.	Ana unà pay	We will run.
Ay ui pay	You will run.	Amun unam pay	We will run.
Har ur pay	He will run.	Um um pay	You will run. (pl)
Happ upp pay	She will run.	Hun un pay	They will run.

Regarding verb structure of the Komo language, all finite lexical verbs, or words that express action, must be structured alongside an Aspect-Directional (AD) suffix. The AD is followed by Bound Pronominal (BP) suffixes that classifies person, number, and gender

The following diagram displays a class diagram for segmental morphemes incorporating a Komo verb:

STEM	-AD	-BP (1)	-BP (2)	-BP (3)

=== Morphology ===
The Komo language relies on directional morphology. These directional morphemes attached to the verbs in a sentence structure are not typically used, but are common among Nilo-Saharan languages. These morphemes code a wide selection of functions beyond a direction of motion. AD morphemes help to code tense and direction of the motion like the words "towards" and "away". AD morphemes can also code the location as well.

sɔ̀kɔ́n ìp-ì-p' ìyyà ɪ́ma
PROG drink.SG-AD1-3SG.F water there
She is drinking water there. (She is there = at the water drinking place)

== Sociolinguistics ==
The region of Western Ethiopia and Eastern Sudan hosts many ethnic and linguistic groups, many of which are closely related, therefore many sociological and linguistic studies of the region contradict one another. A large part of the confusion arises from ethnic identity versus linguistic identity, which may use the same words. Moreover, there is a disparity between self identification and outsider identification. Speakers of Komo self identify as ethnically Komo and are generally identified by others as ethnically Komo as well; however speakers of Gwama may self identify as either ethnically Komo or ethnically Mao, and are generally identified as ethnically Komo by the government. Gwama and Komo are related languages, having about 30% cognates with one another, however they are not mutually intelligible.

The Komo language is mentioned in the constitution of the Benishangul-Gumuz state of Ethiopia, and therefore it is actually warranted higher prestige than other surrounding languages. Moreover, because of this it is included as part of a multilingual education initiative in the region. Most education is in the region is in Amharic, the official language of the state and country, however the Komo ethnic group has the right to receive an education in Komo. Some writing workshops have been run in the Komo language, and an orthography has been conclusively decided, although many Komo speakers remain illiterate. Even though Komo seems to politically be more prestigious, it is generally a minority language in villages with a Gwama speaking majority and most Komo speakers are bilingual in Gwama. This situation appears to be reversed in Sudan, where Komo speakers outnumber Gwama speakers.

Most Komo speakers are bilingual, because they live in close proximity to many other linguistic groups and, at least where research has been conducted in Ethiopia, there are no geographic pockets in which Komo is spoken exclusively. In general, the languages that Komo speakers may be bilingual in are: Gwama, Oromo, or Amharic, although the latter is only likely in the case of people who have achieved a decent education. Amharic and English are assigned very high prestige by Komo speakers, as well as speakers of other minority languages in the region. Women are more likely to be monolingual than men, and younger people are more likely to be bilingual. The Komo linguistic group has no qualms regarding intermarriage with people from other linguistic groups.
