= Uduk =

Uduk can refer to:

- Uduk people, an ethnic group from eastern Sudan, south of the Blue Nile River. This ethnic group continues to identify as Kwanim Pa (uduk), and is the only ethnic group who can still relate to the Kemetic ancient people of modern-day Egypt. These people have suffered from the civil war of 1983, and according to Kwanim Pa historians, these people have said to have come from an area north of Khartoum.
- Uduk language, a language of Ethiopia and Sudan
- Uduk (cuisine), a variety of steamed rice from Indonesia
