= Kwama =

Kwama may refer to:

- Kwama people
- Kwama language
