= Scarification in Africa =

North African woman with facial scarification, c. 1900.

In the culture of Africa, scarification is a widespread cultural practice among certain ethnic groups; the practice includes the process of making "superficial incisions on the skin using stones, glass, knives, or other tools to create meaningful pictures, words, or designs" and expresses "clan identity, status within a community, passage into adulthood, or spiritual significance."

== History ==
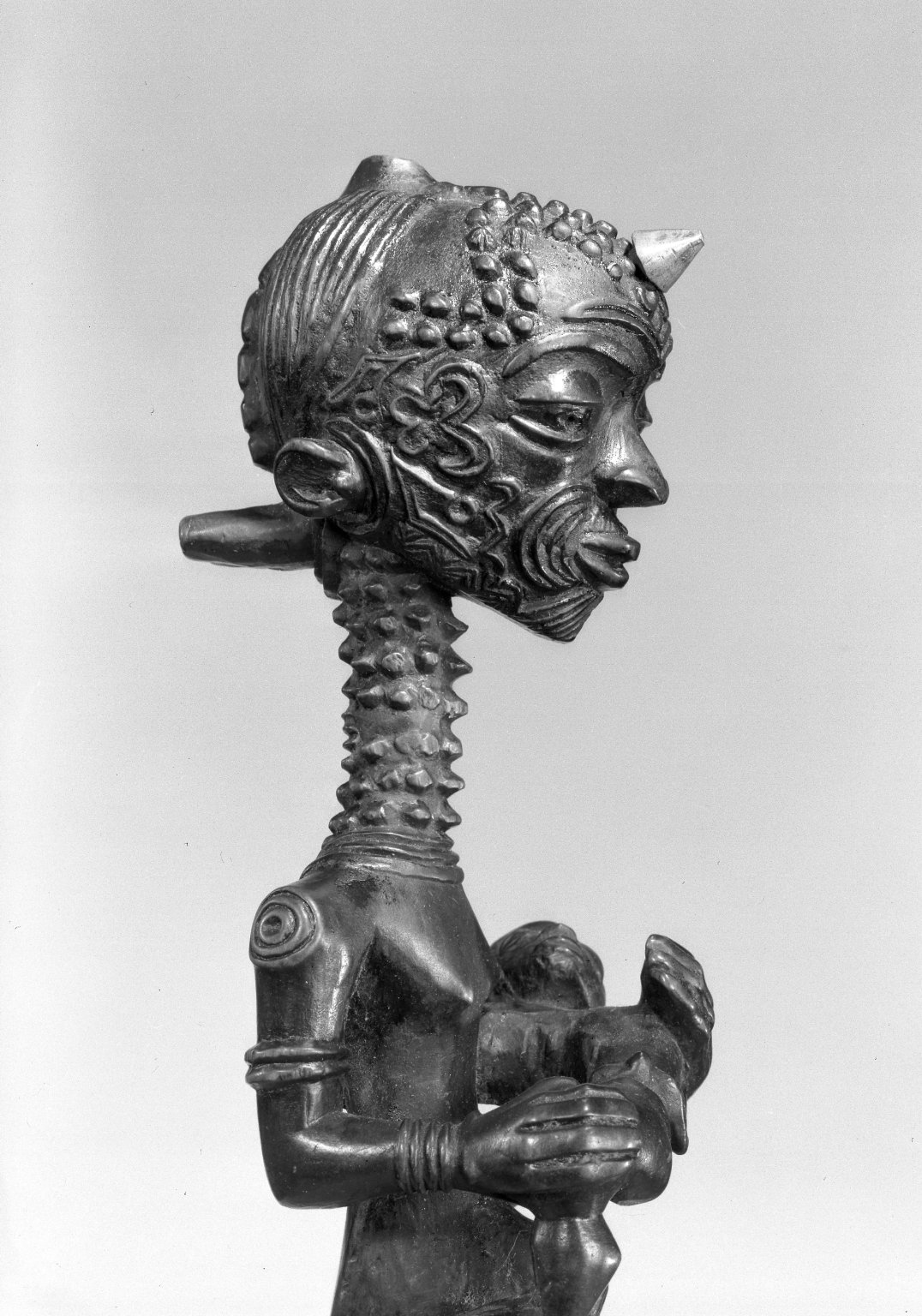
Wooden maternity figure with elaborate scarification from Ndemba, Lulua Province, Democratic Republic of the Congo

Scarification is sometimes included within the category of tattooing, due to both practices creating marks with pigment underneath and textures or pigments on the surface of the skin. In Africa, European colonial governments and European Christian missionaries criminalized and stigmatized the cultural practices of tattooing and scarification; consequently, the practices underwent decline, ended, or continued to be performed as acts of resistance.

While scarification can be mentioned within the realm of tattooing, the two are different. "To signal ethnic identity and role relations, The Bini tattooed their skin. Scarification and cicatrization serve medicinal rather than strictly social purposes." Scarification represents an artistic representation of oneself, as well as a hierarchical status.

=== North Africa ===
Between 5000 BCE and 4000 BCE, pastoral communities from the Sahara peopled the region of Neolithic Egypt and Neolithic Sudan. In this shared material culture of the Nile Valley region, figurines with markings have been found, which indicates that tattooing and scarification may have been cultural practices among these pastoral communities.

==== Algeria ====
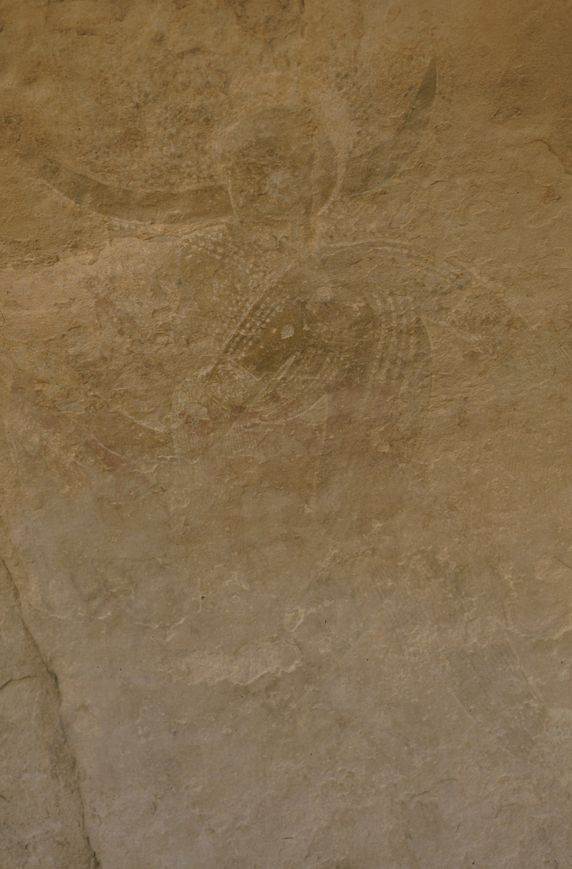
Central Saharan rock art depiction of a horned running woman, who may have been a goddess or a dancer, from the Round Head Period

During the early period of the Holocene (9500 BP - 7500 BP), Round Head rock art was created at Tassili N'Ajjer, in Algeria, and at Tadrart Acacus, in Libya, 70% of which is composed of anthropomorphic art forms; male and female art forms feature scarification marks that differ; linear design patterns are exclusive to male art forms, whereas, crescent-shaped and concentric circular design patterns are exclusive to female art forms. Between the 5th millennium BCE and the 4th millennium BCE, the Central Saharan rock art depiction of a horned running woman, who may have been a goddess or a dancer with body scarification markings (e.g., breasts, belly, thighs, shoulders, calves), was created by Africans, during the Round Head Period of Tassili N’Ajjer, in Tanzoumaitak, Algeria.

==== Egypt ====
During the early 2nd millennium BCE, amid the Eleventh Dynasty of Ancient Egypt, Amunet, a priestess of Hathor, underwent scarification and received a designed pattern of three horizontal parallel lines. In addition to the mummy of a priestess of Hathor, the mummy of a dancer from the Temple of Hathor, both of which have been dated to approximately 4000 BP, show evidence of scarification.

The stone relief of a man from Nubia, which features scarification marks on his forehead, has been dated to the 20th Dynasty of Ramesses III, during the New Kingdom (1181 BCE - 1150 BCE) period of Ancient Egypt.

Winifred Blackman reported facial scarification in Egyptian fellah communities 1920s:

Among the negroid peoples in Egypt, especially among the Berberines, cicatrization lines are often seen along the cheeks. These are probably tribal marks. Occasionally similar marks are to be seen near the ear or on the side of the forehead, and these have usually been made as a cure for bad eyes, headache, or other ills. Some Egyptians have the marks of two or three short cuts on the side of the face close to the ear. When I inquired as to the meaning of these cuts I was told that they were made because it was the custom. This practice is, I think, tending to die out.

==== Libya ====
During the early period of the Holocene (9500 BP - 7500 BP), Round Head rock art was created at Tassili N'Ajjer, in Algeria, and at Tadrart Acacus, in Libya, 70% of which is composed of anthropomorphic art forms; male and female art forms feature scarification marks that differ; linear design patterns are exclusive to male art forms, whereas, crescent-shaped and concentric circular design patterns are exclusive to female art forms.

==== Sudan ====
Sudanese woman with facial scarification, c. 1900.

Kadada figurines from Upper Nubia, which have been dated to 3600 BCE, feature markings that may be tattooing or scarification.

Since at least the ancient Meroe period of Nubia, the cultural practice of facial marking has continued in Sudan, though it has become less common in recent times.

=== West Africa ===
==== Benin ====
Beninese people practiced scarification as a form of identity marker and citizenship in Benin. Since 1930 CE, the rate of scarification has decreased. However, scarification markings (iwu) have since undergone a revival in expression through clothing.

==== Ghana ====
Tribal markings originated in more ancient times. Sculptures with scarification markings were created as early as the 14th century CE. Tribal markings became more widespread as a response to enslaving raids in the 17th century CE. Tribal markings, as symbols of group identity, tied together individuals of a common cultural heritage and ancestry. Consequently, this enabled individuals to find enslaved people who originated from the same African ethnic group. The occurrence of a greater number of medical markings in southern Ghana and a greater number of tribal markings in northern Ghana may be due to enslaving raids occurring more in the northern region of Ghana. As a result of this history, there may be greater individual awareness of collective identity in the northern region of Ghana than in the southern region of Ghana.

==== Mali ====
Multiple figurines have been found in the Inland Niger Delta region of Djenné-Djenno in Mali, including awooden standing female figurine which feature dotted scarification markings in the temple region of the head and indication of pregnancy, may have been created by Djennenke peoples between the 11th and 13th century CE, the sculpture of a mother, with four children, features scarification design patterns (e.g., lines on temples, circles on arms, circles on chest) dated between the 12th and 15th century CE, the head of a terracotta statuette, featuring three snakes encircling the neck region and oblique-shaped scarification markings on its cheeks, and maternity figurines and mounted warrior figurines which feature dotted scarification markings in the temple regions of their heads, and may have been the Kagoro clan of the Soninke people or the Djennenke peoples between the 13th and 16th century CE.

Jennenke-styled brass alloy figurines with serpent ornaments and scarification markings, which have been dated between the 15th century CE and the 17th century CE, may have been inspired from earlier figurines from Old Jenne and Dogon-Tellem cultural traditions, as well as may have their origin in Dogon Country, Mali. Based on the composition of the brass alloy, the brass alloy may have derived from the Hartz Mountains.

==== Nigeria ====
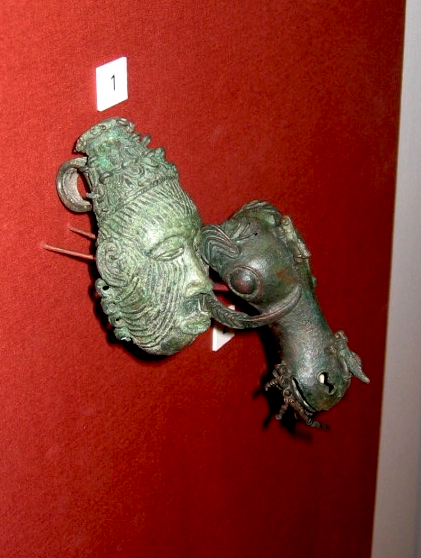
Igbo Ukwu bronzes

Nok sculpture remnants from Katsina Ala feature various stylistic details, including facial markings. One of the Nok sculptures from Katsina Ala has been dated, via thermoluminescence dating, to 400 ± 125 BCE

Between 660 CE and 1045 CE, the Igbo Ukwu culture of the Kingdom of Nri produced various types of bronze items (e.g., beetles, flies, grasshopper/locust eggs, and heads of animals such as elephants, leopards, monkeys, pythons, rams, and snails) from Igbo Ukwu and Ezira.

Early archaeological evidence of body modification, such as tattoo and scarification markings, have been found among the Benin, Ife, Igbo, Nok, and Ukwa peoples, including male and female Benin Bronzes, which have been dated to the 16th century CE and the 17th century CE.

In Nigeria, evidence of scarification has been found on Ife sculptures composed of terracotta and copper, which have been dated to 1100 CE, and Owo sculptures composed of terracotta, which have been dated to 1400 CE.

There are also Yoruba facial markings that have been documented during the 19th century CE and the 20th century CE. The Yoruba peoples acknowledge the painful nature of scarification and use the process as a symbol of bravery. Women in particular would be tested to see if they would agree to and endure the application of complex scarification patterns. The Yoruba also have a tendency to place plant materials on fresh cuts as a way to attract a particular god to that person as a part of the scarification process.

=== Central Africa ===
Bantu-speaking Central Africans and other Bantu-speaking Africans, such as the Baluba, Bafipa, Batshokwe, Baushi, Mashona, constructed decorated furnaces, which symbolized transformation as well as were made in the shape of women, with breasts, and scarification usually made in the region of the stomach, during the Early Iron Age in Africa.

=== Eastern Africa ===
==== Ethiopia ====
At Dirikoro, in the southwestern-most region of Ethiopia, engraved and painted pastoral rock art have been linked to cattle scarification practices, via branding, and body scarification practices (e.g., Riru, Kichoa) among the Mursi people. Mursi men receive Riru scarification markings, in the form of a Miren design pattern (a double ‘u’ symbol), which may be received when cattle raids are successful; while Mursi women receive three Miren-styled markings, Mursi men receive four; in addition to being connected by heat used in the process of scarification, both oxen and Mursi men receive four Miren-styled markings. While Saharan pastoral rock art has been dated to the second half of the seventh millennium BP, Ethiopian pastoral rock art has been dated between 5000 BP and 4000 BP.

Square symbols in western Ethiopian rock art and facial scarification design patterns, mostly found on women from Ethio-Sudanese borderland groups, such as the Gumuz people and the Kwama people in the Benishangul-Gumuz region of Ethiopia and the Mabaan people of Sudan, share a close similarity in appearance. A single cow out of a herd, managed by cattle pastoralists, also had a reticular-shaped scarification marking that matched Bel Bembesh rock art in Assosa. Among western Ethiopian rock art sites in the Benishangul-Gumuz region, the rock painting sites of Bel Bembesh and Bel ash-Sharifu may be dated to the Later Stone Age; the painted Bel K’urk’umu rock art, near Assosa, has been radiocarbon dated between 4965 BP and 875 BP, which corresponds with pottery sherds found near the rock art that have been dated between 1985 BP and 275 BP; these rock painting sites have been attributed in origin to local Koman speakers, who may have resided in the area for millennia, prior to the influx of Sudanese herders during the mid-Holocene.

=== Southern Africa ===
==== South Africa ====
At Schroda, located in the region of Zhizo, Limpopo, South Africa that was peopled by Bantu-speaking peoples, 2000 figurine remnants with scarification markings were found, which date between the 7th century CE and the 8th century CE; from this foundation, Great Zimbabwe emerged in the 13th century CE.

== Customs ==
=== North Africa ===
==== Egypt ====
During the early 2nd millennium BCE, amid the Eleventh Dynasty of Ancient Egypt, Amunet, a priestess of Hathor, underwent scarification and received a designed pattern of three horizontal parallel lines. In addition to the mummy of a priestess of Hathor, the mummy of a dancer from the Temple of Hathor, both of which have been dated to approximately 4000 BP, show evidence of scarification.

==== Sudan ====
Nubian women from the C-Group culture show evidence of having received tattoos. Nubian men and women from the ancient Meroë period also show evidence of having received tattoos and scarification. Nubian ethnic groups, such as the Ja’aliyyin people, have three vertical facial markings, whereas, the Shaigiya people have three horizontal facial markings.

=== West Africa ===
==== Benin ====
In the southern region of Benin, the Tofinu people have a cultural practice of scarification; the practice produces cultural motifs in the form of a scarified design pattern associated with crocodiles.

Beninese people practiced scarification as a form of identity marker and citizenship in Benin. Since 1930 CE, the rate of scarification has decreased. However, scarification markings (iwu) have since undergone a revival in expression through clothing.

==== Burkina Faso ====
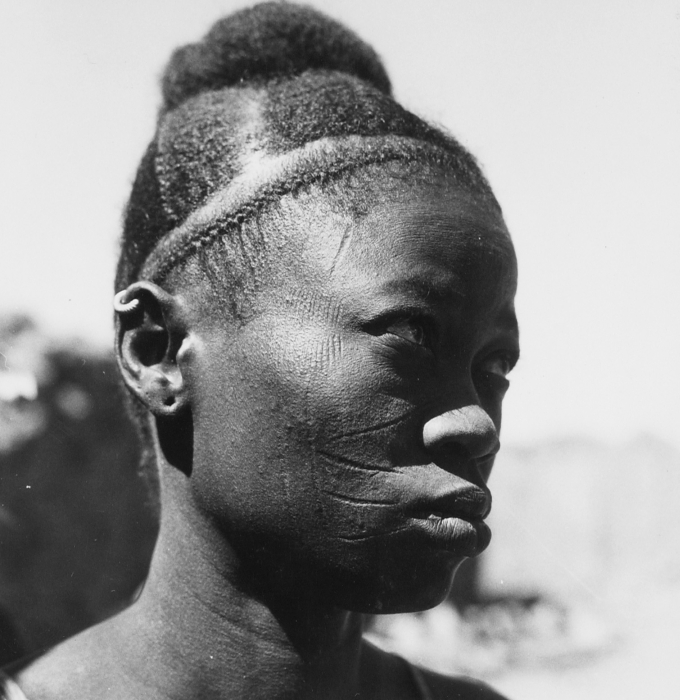
Woman from Burkina Faso with facial markings

Ethnic groups in Burkina Faso practice a form of scarification.

In Burkina Faso, the Bobo people have a cultural practice of scarification; the practice produces cultural motifs in the form of a scarified design pattern associated with crocodiles.

==== Ghana ====
In Ghana, African scarification, or African tribal marks, are decorative marks of beautification created by a wanzan (a person who creates the tribal marks). While some may receive tribal marks amid naming commemorations as infants, most males and females receive tribal marks as teenagers.

Though it may not be considered to be tribal marks, but rather, medical marks or decorative marks; in particular, these may be viewed as decorative marks representing family bonds among most Dagomba people in Wulijuah, Gwollu, northern Ghana. Children may receive these family marks from their father, and may not receive it if their father has died. The marks are composed of a small vertical, parallel markings on both cheeks (may bear some similarity in appearance to tears). In village areas located outside of Wa and Gwollu, many people received an “s”-shaped tattoos on their foreheads. In the village of Ginkpan, males had one of these vertical markings on their rights cheeks, whereas, females had two of these vertical markings as well as these “s”-shaped tattoos on their foreheads.

In the Central Komenda village of Abrobiano, traditional priests or practitioners of African herbalism created markings, viewed as being imbued with mystic power, for the purpose of providing spiritual defense against demonic spirits or spirits of evil. The markings may be created on any area of the body (e.g., hips, wrists, upper arms, legs, feet). While sometimes given to infants, the markings are mostly given to individuals of matured age; as individuals generally regarded as enduring greater adversity, the markings are mostly given to men. In times prior, such as in Gwollu, these spiritual markings were styled in the form of rings or designed on attire; however, it developed into body markings due to the permanence of the markings. The markings are not created amid any particular commemoration, were markings treated with muha (tree bark-derived medicine), and the person receiving the marking may also be treated by being bathed in herbal water so as to receive a form magical and spiritual protection that cannot be removed from them, and thus, receive a form of physical and mental strengthening against curses, diseases, and calamity. Many also do not receive the traditional markings due to non-traditional religious views of them being marks of evil and witchcraft.

The practice of making small horizontal markings for medical purposes, also known as Ashanti medical marks, are widespread throughout Ghana and is thus evidence of the widespread use of the traditional medicine among the modern peoples of Ghana. Medical markings may be widespread throughout Ghana due to the migration of Ashanti people, from the Ashanti Region, to and throughout the northern and southern regions of Ghana. The small horizontal markings, which were also characterized as “bird marks” in Cape Coast, may derive from an oral tradition of a “nobile bird” that flies above and spreads disease (e.g., convulsions) to young children. Consequently, the small horizontal markings, which are filled with medicine, are made to provide healing to the children. The Frafra people also identified by large tribal markings on their faces. In Gwollu, located in the Sissala West District of Ghana, the “bird marks” are given to treatment for diseases (e.g., paralysis, fever) deriving from the bird known as Diwie. The medical markings, or Diwie marks, are also made reduce pain, prevent girls from growing an Adam’s apple, prevent tumors, prevent swelling in abdominal region due to improper cutting of the umbilical cord. Medical markings are mostly performed by a relative (e.g., grandmother, mother, father) or by a traditional practitioner of herbalism who filled the markings a medical mixture composed of various ingredients (e.g., herbs, finely ground tree bark, water, shea butter).

After the death of a child, the subsequent child, known as “Kosan”, receive a medical marking known as “Donkor.” The medical marking is made, based on belief in reincarnation, and that the subsequent child carries the spirit of the previous dead child; hence, the name of the child, “Kosan”, meaning “child who goes and comes” – a child who is going to and coming from the ancestral realm. The Donkor marking, composed of three horizontal lines to the side of each eye and three horizontal lines made from either side of the mouth (similar in appearance to crow’s feet), may vary in size based on the number of miscarriages a woman has had and may be made shortly after birth or eight days following, during their naming ceremony. In instances where the Donkor markings are made eight days after birth, this timeframe is to observe whether or not the Kosan will return to the ancestral realm. Face markings (e.g., X-marks on the cheek) and bestowing of unattractive names may be given to the child to prevent the child from returning to the ancestral realm, based on the view that those in the ancestral realm would view the child as unappealing.

Group markings vary by group (e.g., family, tribe, clan) and by region, within Ghana, and throughout West Africa (e.g., Yoruba people in Nigeria), at-large. Group markings also identify which clans/tribes can marry into one another. There may be some degree of group identity expressed through tribal markings among the Jaffise and Nyimati groups on the outskirts of Gwollu. Though individual interpretation of a tribal marking may acknowledge it as such or not, tribal markings can be identified based on there being a shared marking(s) and collective consciousness.

While tribal markings in Wa, Ghana have waned, royal families among the Mossi people still continue the tradition of tribal markings. As land ownership and matrilineal inheritance is recognized as being through lineages, this has caused ongoing disputes among various families. Land has become increasingly scarce due to changes in uses of land, toward the farming of cash crops. There are also dry seasons. Due to the increasingly unstable conditions in the northern region of Ghana, which is similar to unstable conditions in northern regions throughout West Africa (e.g., Burkina Faso, Ivory Coast, Togo), this has resulted in tribal markings becoming increasingly stigmatized.

The Dagomba, Frafra, Gonja, Mamprusi, and Nanumba peoples in the northern region of Ghana practice a form of scarification.

==== Nigeria ====
Rather than being made via tattoo or paint, Yoruba facial markings, which convey identity and lineage for Yoruba people, are made via scarification. Among the Yoruba people, facial markings (kolo) convey “audacity, perseverance and resolution, but also feelings (e.g. mourning, grief, sorrow), religious beliefs, and animal and plant symbols.”

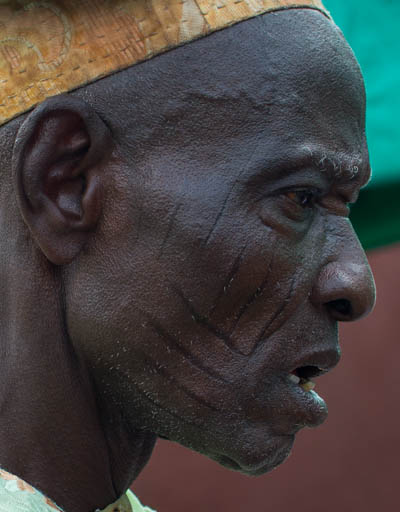
Nigeria African culture; Scarification; Yoruba

Historically, the Igbo people have had the cultural practice of body markings. Markings for women are known as Itu Mbibi, whereas, markings for men are known as Igbu Ichi; the Igbu Ichi facial markings symbolize honor, integrity, and valor.

Similarly in eastern Nigeria, Igbo scarification denoted age, gender, and political authority. As permanent body marking decreased. women continued painting designs, known as Uli on the walls of their houses, on pottery, and on their bodies as temporary decoration during coming of age ceremonies (S.Adm 2002; Cole & Aniorkor 1984, pp. 39-46; Willis 1989).

The Bali people of Nigeria have a cultural practice of scarification; the practice produces scarified cultural motifs in the form of a mythical ancestral bird that bestows reincarnation.

The Dimmuk, Merniang, and Montol peoples of Nigeria have cultural practices of scarification; their practices produce cultural motifs in the form of scarified design patterns associated with crocodiles.

Tattoos vary across regions of Africa and each tribe/people have different types of tattoos that they choose to brand themselves with, all with different meanings. All African tattoos are considered lived experiences, and not always for body adornment or ornamental purposes. It is a shared experience, tying the person to their tribe or people. For many African cultures, they turn to scarification rather than tattoos for their body adornment. This process of scarification or tattooing was seen as a huge triumph of bravery and courage, an initiation process or a rite of passage. For the Yoruba tribe, tattoos and scarification were used for both beautification and a representation of courage for the individual. African tattoos are rarely representative, which makes determining their meaning and background difficult. But magical practices are often linked directly to the functionality of the tattoo. These tattoos were not usually applied all at once, and instead were added onto over time. The Yoruba believed that the outer appearance was a visual representation of the inner spirit. Yoruba tattoo masters, or "oniisonon" — "one who creates art" —were held in high regard, as their skill and speed was considered to be unmatched.

=== Central Africa ===
==== Cameroon ====
In Cameroon, facial markings are a cultural practice of the Mbororo people.

==== Democratic Republic of Congo ====
In the Democratic Republic of Congo, the Kuba people practice scarification; in particular, Kuba women receive body markings composed of variously designed patterns.

Luluwa people, and the wooden figurines created by the Luluwa people, undergo scarification using various methods and designs.

==== South Sudan ====
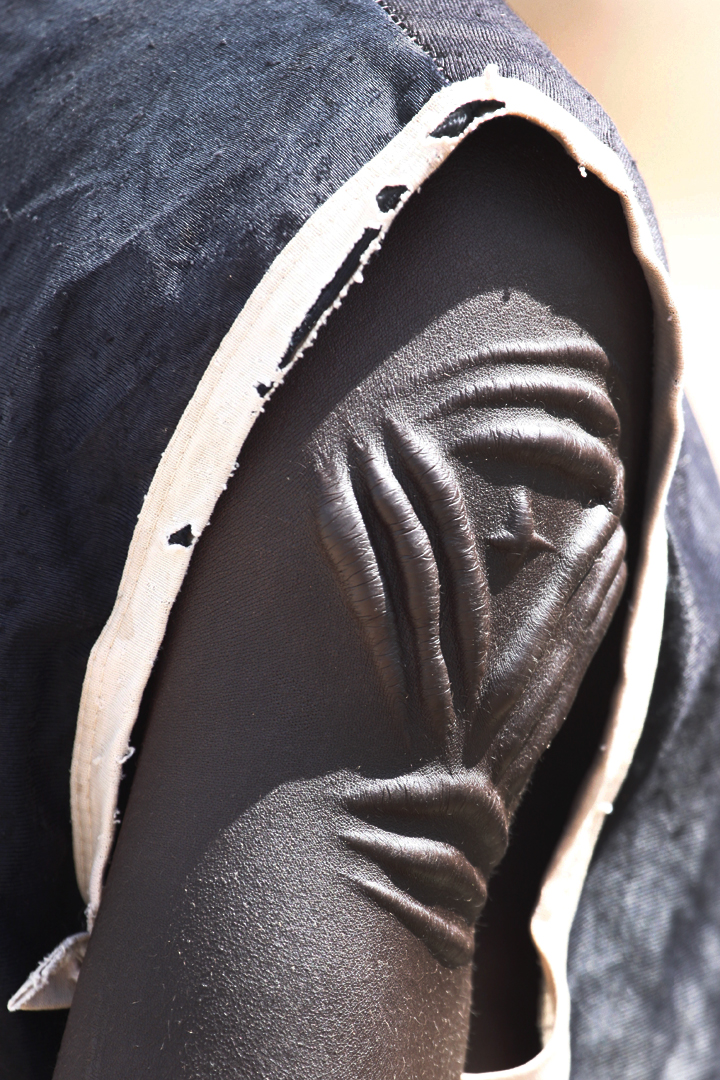
South Sudanese body markings

In South Sudan, the Moru people have a cultural practice of scarification; the practice produces cultural motifs in the form of a scarified design pattern associated with crocodiles.

Dinka, Nuer, and some other Nilotic peoples in South Sudan have cultural practices of scarification, which produces scars on their foreheads.

The Schilluk and the Toposa peoples of South Sudan have a cultural practice of scarification, which produces a punctuated, semicircular scarified design pattern from one ear to the other.

=== Eastern Africa ===
Fula people in East Africa have a cultural practice of scarification for women of high social status, which produces a four triple-lined scarified design pattern on their faces to indicate their social status. The Fulani also had markings that are meant to make the bearer more attractive to the opposite sex.

==== Ethiopia ====
In Ethiopia, the Bumi people have a cultural practice of scarification for men, which produces a scarified design pattern on parts of their cheeks.

At Dirikoro, in the southwestern-most region of Ethiopia, engraved and painted pastoral rock art have been linked to cattle scarification practices, via branding, and body scarification practices (e.g., Riru, Kichoa) among the Mursi people. Mursi men receive Riru scarification markings, in the form of a Miren design pattern (a double ‘u’ symbol), which may be received when cattle raids are successful; while Mursi women receive three Miren-styled markings, Mursi men receive four; in addition to being connected by heat used in the process of scarification, both oxen and Mursi men receive four Miren-styled markings. While Saharan pastoral rock art has been dated to the second half of the seventh millennium BP, Ethiopian pastoral rock art has been dated between 5000 BP and 4000 BP.

==== Kenya ====
In Kenya, the Maasai people have a cultural practice of scarification relating to hunting; the practice produces a scarified design pattern of circles and semicircles on both cheeks, and for young males, of circles as identity markers and step toward becoming a courageous adult male.

==== Tanzania ====
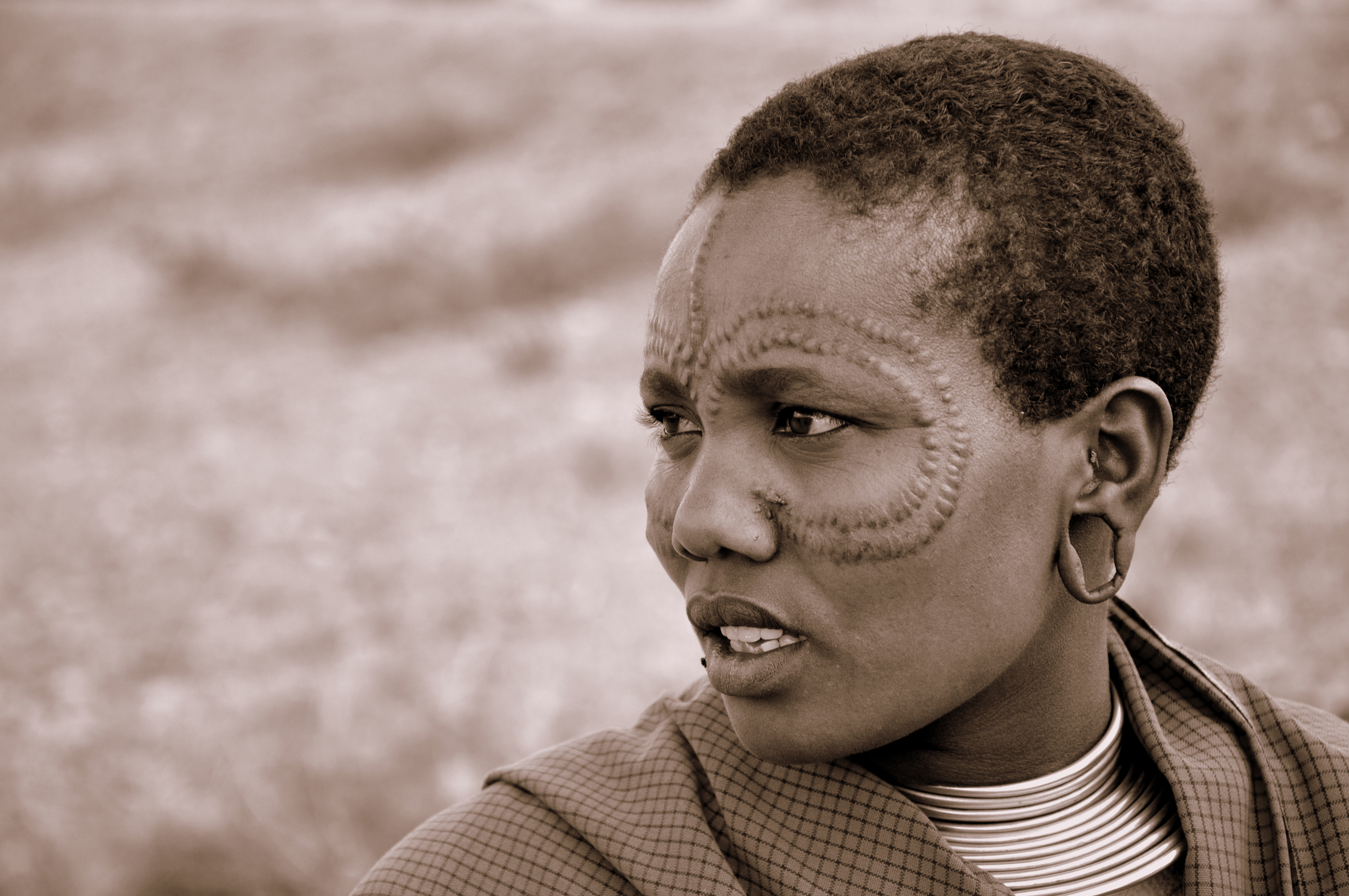
Datooga woman with facial markings

In Tanzania, the Bondei and Shambaa peoples have cultural practices of scarification; their practice produces scarified cultural motifs in the form of a mythical ancestral bird that bestows reincarnation.

The Maasai people of Tanzania have a cultural practice of scarification relating to hunting; the practice produces a scarified design pattern of circles and semicircles on both cheeks, and for young males, of circles as identity markers and indication of becoming a brave adult male.

The Barabaig people of Tanzania have a cultural practice of scarification for women, which produces a scarified design pattern of dots.

The Makonde people of Tanzania often had lizard markings on their chest as a way to symbolize fertility in women and virility in men. The Makonde also used scarification as a way to heal wounds. They would make small incisions where healing needed to take place and insert medical remedies and herbs on the cut. Generally, having more scars is associated with having a more respectable lifestyle such as being a member of nobility or a consistent contributor to the community.

=== Southern Africa ===
==== Angola ====
The Ovimbundu people of Angola practice a form of scarification.

==== Malawi ====
In Malawi, the Tonga people have a cultural practice of scarification relating to hunting; the practice produces a scar from one eyebrow to the other, which is produced in order to imitate the appearance of a buffalo and to show strength and determination.

==== South Africa ====
In South Africa, body marking (ukuqatshulwa) is ritualistic practice among the Xhosa people.

==== Zambia ====
In Zambia, the Tonga people have a cultural practice of scarification relating to hunting; the practice produces a scar from one eyebrow to the other, which is produced in order to imitate the appearance of a buffalo and to show strength and determination.

==== Zimbabwe ====
In Zimbabwe, the Tonga people have a cultural practice of scarification relating to hunting; the practice produces a scar from one eyebrow to the other, which is produced in order to imitate the appearance of a buffalo and to show strength and determination.

== Art ==
=== North Africa ===
Between 5000 BCE and 4000 BCE, pastoral communities from the Sahara peopled the region of Neolithic Egypt and Neolithic Sudan. In this shared material culture of the Nile Valley region, figurines with markings have been found, which indicates that tattooing and scarification may have been cultural practices among these pastoral communities.

==== Algeria ====
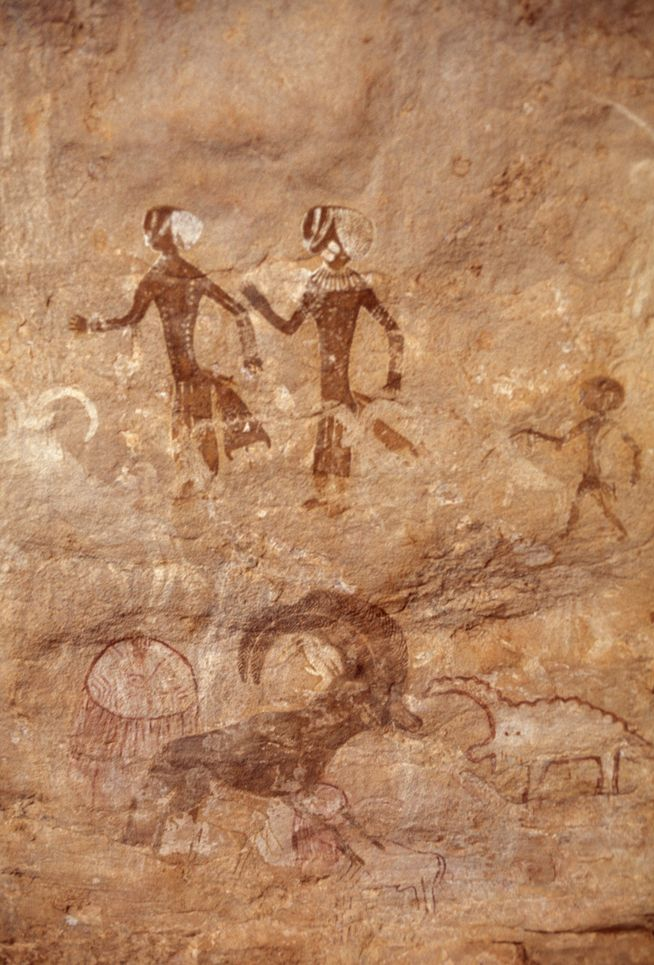
Round Head figures and zoomorphic figures, including a Barbary sheep

During the early period of the Holocene (9500 BP - 7500 BP), Round Head rock art was created at Tassili N'Ajjer, in Algeria, and at Tadrart Acacus, in Libya, 70% of which is composed of anthropomorphic art forms; male and female art forms feature scarification marks that differ; linear design patterns are exclusive to male art forms, whereas, crescent-shaped and concentric circular design patterns are exclusive to female art forms. Between the 5th millennium BCE and the 4th millennium BCE, the Central Saharan rock art depiction of a horned running woman, who may have been a goddess or a dancer with body scarification markings (e.g., breasts, belly, thighs, shoulders, calves), was created by Africans, during the Round Head Period of Tassili N’Ajjer, in Tanzoumaitak, Algeria.

==== Egypt ====
The stone relief of a man from Nubia, which features scarification marks on his forehead, has been dated to the 20th Dynasty of Ramesses III, during the New Kingdom (1181 BCE - 1150 BCE) period of Ancient Egypt.

==== Libya ====
During the early period of the Holocene (9500 BP - 7500 BP), Round Head rock art was created at Tassili N'Ajjer, in Algeria, and at Tadrart Acacus, in Libya, 70% of which is composed of anthropomorphic art forms; male and female art forms feature scarification marks that differ; linear design patterns are exclusive to male art forms, whereas, crescent-shaped and concentric circular design patterns are exclusive to female art forms.

==== Sudan ====
Kadada figurines from Upper Nubia, which have been dated to 3600 BCE, feature markings that may be tattooing or scarification.

=== West Africa ===
==== Mali ====
A wooden standing female figurine from the Inland Niger Delta region of Djenné-Djenno in Mali, which feature dotted scarification markings in the temple region of the head and indication of pregnancy, may have been created by Djennenke peoples between the 11th century CE and the 13th century CE.

At Djenné-Djenno, the sculpture of a mother, with four children, features scarification design patterns (e.g., lines on temples, circles on arms, circles on chest). The sculpture has been dated between the 12th century CE and the 15th century CE. In the westernmost region of Djenné-Djenno, there was also the head of a terracotta statuette, which may have been constructed in the latter period of Djenné-Djenno or a period thereafter, and featured three snakes encircling the neck region and oblique-shaped scarification markings on its cheeks; snakes are a recurring trait among statuettes found in the Inner Niger Delta region.

Maternity figurines and mounted warrior figurines from the Inland Niger Delta region of Djenné-Djenno in Mali, which feature dotted scarification markings in the temple regions of their heads, may have been the Kagoro clan of the Soninke people or the Djennenke peoples between the 13th century CE and the 16th century CE.

Jennenke-styled brass alloy figurines with serpent ornaments and scarification markings, which have been dated between the 15th century CE and the 17th century CE, may have been inspired from earlier figurines from Old Jenne and Dogon-Tellem cultural traditions, as well as may have their origin in Dogon Country, Mali. Based on the composition of the brass alloy, the brass alloy may have derived from the Hartz Mountains.

The wooden Dogon fertility statuette, Nassourou, which originated in the Mori Village, Cercle of Kono, Arrondissement of Ningari, Mali, features facial markings on its cheeks.

==== Nigeria ====
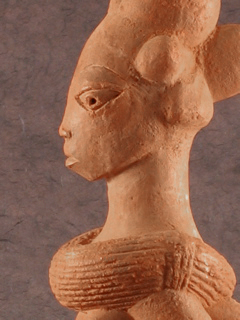
Nok terracotta figurine

Nok sculpture remnants from Katsina Ala feature various stylistic details, including facial markings. One of the Nok sculptures from Katsina Ala has been dated, via thermoluminescence dating, to 400 ± 125 BCE

Between 660 CE and 1045 CE, the Igbo Ukwu culture of the Kingdom of Nri produced various types of bronze items (e.g., beetles, flies, grasshopper/locust eggs, and heads of animals such as elephants, leopards, monkeys, pythons, rams, and snails) from Igbo Ukwu and Ezira.

Early archaeological evidence of body modification, such as tattoo and scarification markings, have been found among the Benin, Ife, Igbo, Nok, and Ukwa peoples, including male and female Benin Bronzes, which have been dated to the 16th century CE and the 17th century CE.

In Nigeria, evidence of scarification has been found on Ife sculptures composed of terracotta and copper, which have been dated to 1100 CE, and Owo sculptures composed of terracotta, which have been dated to 1400 CE.

=== Central Africa ===
Bantu-speaking Central Africans and other Bantu-speaking Africans, such as the Baluba, Bafipa, Batshokwe, Baushi, Mashona, constructed decorated furnaces, which symbolized transformation as well as were made in the shape of women, with breasts, and scarification usually made in the region of the stomach, during the Early Iron Age in Africa.

==== Democratic Republic of the Congo ====
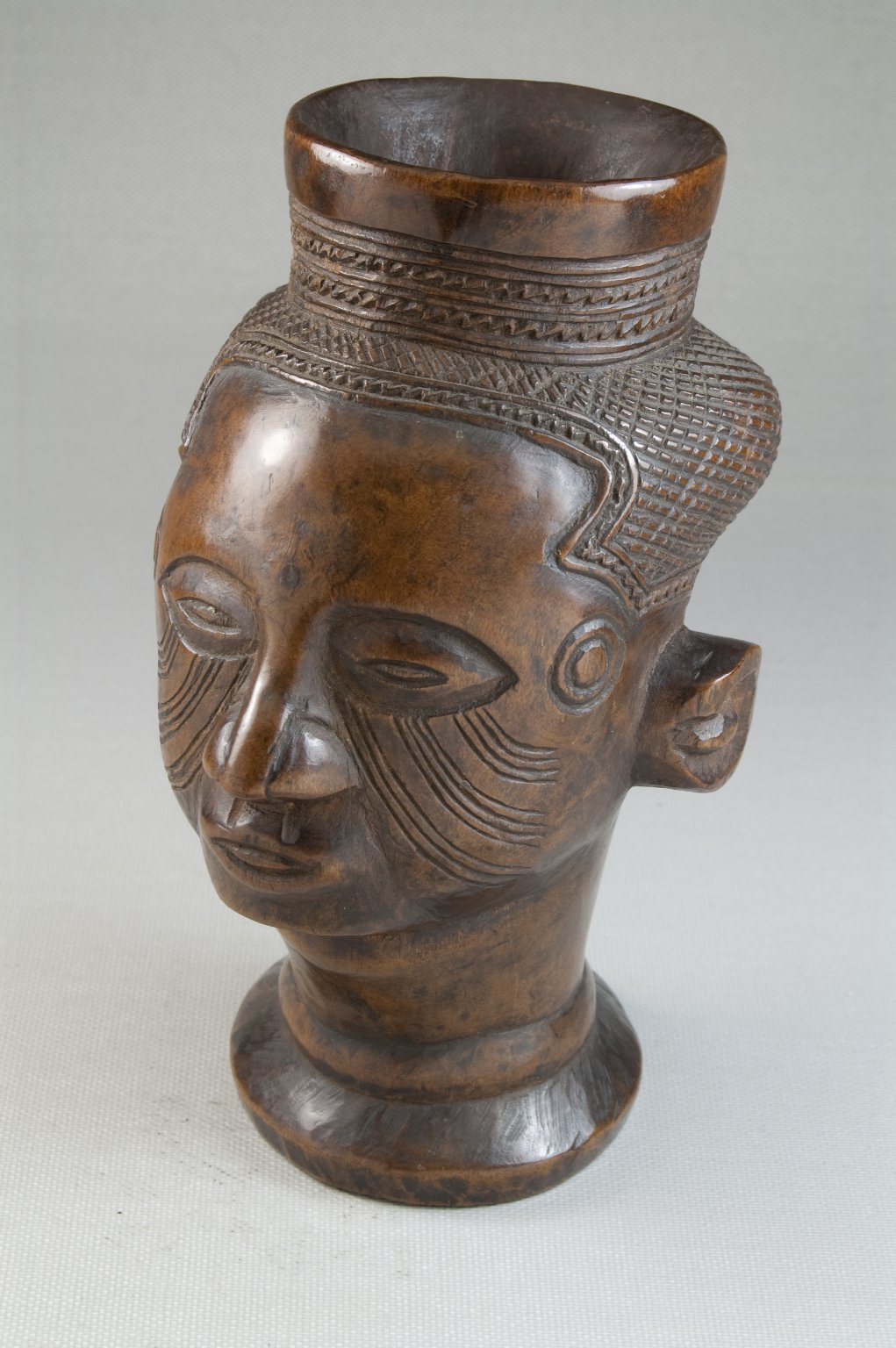
Wooden cup in the shape of a human head with stylized features from the Kuba culture. Cheeks have curved multilinear facial markings.

Luluwa people, and the wooden figurines created by the Luluwa people, undergo scarification using various methods and designs. The Luluwa sculpture of woman holding a cup, from the Democratic Republic of the Congo, also features scarification marks.

A Zula sculpture of a woman, which is from the Democratic Republic of the Congo and symbolized the seat of power for male rulers, also featured scarification marks.

A Kanyok headrest, from the Democratic Republic of the Congo, features scarification marks.

=== Eastern Africa ===
==== Ethiopia ====
At Dirikoro, in the southwestern-most region of Ethiopia, engraved and painted pastoral rock art have been linked to cattle scarification practices, via branding, and body scarification practices (e.g., Riru, Kichoa) among the Mursi people. Mursi men receive Riru scarification markings, in the form of a Miren design pattern (a double ‘u’ symbol), which may be received when cattle raids are successful; while Mursi women receive three Miren-styled markings, Mursi men receive four; in addition to being connected by heat used in the process of scarification, both oxen and Mursi men receive four Miren-styled markings. While Saharan pastoral rock art has been dated to the second half of the seventh millennium BP, Ethiopian pastoral rock art has been dated between 5000 BP and 4000 BP.

Square symbols in western Ethiopian rock art and facial scarification design patterns, mostly found on women from Ethio-Sudanese borderland groups, such as the Gumuz people and the Kwama people in the Benishangul-Gumuz region of Ethiopia and the Mabaan people of Sudan, share a close similarity in appearance. A single cow out of a herd, managed by cattle pastoralists, also had a reticular-shaped scarification marking that matched Bel Bembesh rock art in Assosa. Among western Ethiopian rock art sites in the Benishangul-Gumuz region, the rock painting sites of Bel Bembesh and Bel ash-Sharifu may be dated to the Later Stone Age; the painted Bel K’urk’umu rock art, near Assosa, has been radiocarbon dated between 4965 BP and 875 BP, which corresponds with pottery sherds found near the rock art that have been dated between 1985 BP and 275 BP; these rock painting sites have been attributed in origin to local Koman speakers, who may have resided in the area for millennia, prior to the influx of Sudanese herders during the mid-Holocene.

=== Southern Africa ===
==== South Africa ====
At Schroda, located in the region of Zhizo, Limpopo, South Africa that was peopled by Bantu-speaking peoples, 2000 figurine remnants with scarification markings were found, which date between the 7th century CE and the 8th century CE; from this foundation, Great Zimbabwe emerged in the 13th century CE.
