= Dana language =

Koman language of South Sudan

Dana
- Native to: South Sudan
- Region: near the Ethiopian border
- Language family: Nilo-Saharan?: Komuz?; Koman; Central Koman; Dana–Opo; Dana

Language codes
- ISO 639-3: None (mis)
- Glottolog: buld1238

The Dana language, referred to in older literature as Buldit, is a recently recognized Koman language of Ethiopia. It is geographically close to the Opuo language but is not mutually intelligible with it.
