= Gumuz language =

Language spoken in Ethiopia and Sudan

Gumuz
- Native to: Ethiopia, Sudan
- Region: Benishangul-Gumuz Region; Amhara Region; Blue Nile State
- Ethnicity: Gumuz
- Native speakers: Ethiopia: 160,000 (2007 census); Sudan: 88,000 (2017)
- Language family: Nilo-Saharan?: Komuz?; Bʼaga; Gumuz
- Dialects: Northern; Southern; Yaso
- Writing system: Ethiopic, Latin (in Ethiopia)

Language codes
- ISO 639-3: guk
- Glottolog: gumu1244 Northern Gumuz sout3236 Southern Gumuz

Gumuz (also spelled Gumaz) is a dialect cluster spoken along the border of Ethiopia and Sudan. It has been tentatively classified within the Nilo-Saharan family. Most Ethiopian speakers live in Kamashi Zone and Metekel Zone of the Benishangul-Gumuz Region, although a group of 1,000 reportedly live outside the town of Welkite (Unseth 1989). The Sudanese speakers live in the area east of Er Roseires, around Famaka and Fazoglo on the Blue Nile, extending north along the border. Dimmendaal et al. (2019) suspect that the poorly attested varieties spoken along the river constitute a distinct language, Kadallu.

An early record of this language is a wordlist from the Mount Guba area compiled in February 1883 by Juan Maria Schuver.

== Varieties ==
Varieties are not all mutually intelligible. By that standard, there are two or three Gumuz languages. Grammatical forms are distinct between northern and southern Gumuz.

Daats'iin, discovered in 2013, is clearly a distinct language, though closest to southern Gumuz. The poorly attested varieties in Sudan are likely a distinct language as well, Kadallu. (See Bʼaga languages.)

Ethnologue lists Guba, Wenbera, Sirba, Agalo, Yaso, Mandura, Dibate, and Metemma as Gumuz dialects, with Mandura, Dibate, and Metemma forming a dialect cluster.

Ahland (2004) provides comparative lexical data for the Guba, Mandura, North Dibat'e, Wenbera, Sirba Abay, Agelo Meti, Yaso, and Metemma dialects.

== Phonology ==
Gumuz has both ejective consonants and implosives. The implosive quality is being lost at the velar point of articulation in some dialects (Unseth 1989). There is a series of palatal consonants, including both ejective and implosive. In some dialects, e.g. Sirba, there is a labialized palatalized bilabial stop, as in the word for 'rat' [bʲʷa] (Unseth 1989).

=== Consonants ===
Consonants in Northern Gumuz
		Labial	Alveolar		Post-alv./ Palatal	Velar		Uvular		Glottal
		Labial	Alveolar		Post-alv./ Palatal	plain	lab.	plain	lab.	Glottal
Nasal		m	n		(ɲ)	ŋ	(ŋʷ)			
Stop	voiceless	p	t		c	k	(kʷ)			ʔ
Stop	voiced	b	d		ɟ	g	(ɡʷ)			
Stop	ejective	pʼ	tʼ		cʼ	kʼ	(kʼʷ)			
Stop	implosive	ɓ	ɗ							
Affricate	voiceless		t͡s		t͡ʃ					
Affricate	ejective		t͡sʼ		t͡ʃʼ					
Fricative	voiceless	f	s		ʃ			χ	(χʷ)	
Fricative	voiced	(v)	z		ʒ					
Tap/Trill			(ɾ)	(r)						
Lateral			l							
Approximant					j		w			

- The tap [ɾ] mainly occurs in morpheme-internal positions, and not in word-initial position. It also occurs as an allophone of /ɗ/ in intervocalic and word-final positions.
- A trill [r] may occur from ideophones or as a result of loanwords from Amharic.

Consonants in Southern Gumuz
		Labial	Alveolar	Post-alv./ Palatal	Velar		Glottal
		Labial	Alveolar	Post-alv./ Palatal	plain	lab.	Glottal
Nasal		m	n	(ɲ)	ŋ	(ŋʷ)	
Stop	voiceless	p	t	c	k	(kʷ)	ʔ
Stop	voiced	b	d	ɟ	g	(ɡʷ)	
Stop	ejective	pʼ	tʼ	cʼ	kʼ	(kʼʷ)	
Stop	implosive	ɓ	ɗ		(ɠ)		
Affricate	voiceless		t͡s	t͡ʃ			
Affricate	ejective		t͡sʼ	t͡ʃʼ			
Fricative	voiceless	f	s	ʃ			h
Fricative	voiced	(v)	z	ʒ			
Tap			ɾ				
Lateral			l				
Approximant				j		w	

- A velar implosive [ɠ] tends to only exist in the Agelo Meti dialect.
- A labialized bilabial plosive [bʷ] tends to only exist in the Sirba Abay dialect.
- A voiced fricative [β] may occur when /ɓ/ tends to weaken in word-final position in some dialects.

==== Both dialects ====
- The labio dental [v] only occurs in rare distribution, and mainly occurs in intervocalic and word-initial positions. It is also possibly introduced via derivation from ideophones.
- The palatal [ɲ] only occurs word-internally in intervocalic environments, before a palatal consonant, or as an allophone of /n/ before a front vowel.
- [ŋʷ] only occurs in rare distribution, or when /ŋ/ occurs before a weakened short rounded vowel.
- Other labialized consonants [kʷ, ɡʷ, kʼʷ, χʷ] tend to occur as a result of velar or uvular consonants preceding weakened short rounded vowels that precede another vowel.

=== Vowels ===
	Front	Central	Back
Close	i iː		u uː
Mid	e eː	(ə)	o oː
Open		a aː	

- Short allophones of /i, e, a, o, u/ can be heard as [ɪ, ɛ, ə, ɔ, ʊ].
- A central close vowel [ɨ] may occur in various positions after a shortened /u/ when labializing a velar or uvular consonant.

=== Tone ===
Tones are high and low, with downstep.

== Grammar ==
Word order is AVO, with marked nominative case, though there is AOV order in the north, probably from Amharic influence.

In intransitive clauses, subjects in S–V order are unmarked, whereas those in V–S order are marked for nominative case.
