= Country mark =

A country mark is a type of scarification noted among 18th century and 19th century slaves brought to North America as part of the Atlantic slave trade. Country marks were commonly used to identify individual slaves and were frequently mentioned in newspaper advertisements that attempted to find escaped slaves. Historians of the slave trade have used country marks to identify the national origins of individual slaves, whose origins may not have been recorded in print.

== See also ==
- Scarification in Africa
