= XOM =

Xom or XOM may refer to:

- ExxonMobil (NYSE: XOM)
- Komo language (ISO 639: xom), a Nilo-Saharan spoken in Ethiopia, Sudan, and Southern Sudan
- Sovereign Military Order of Malta
- XML Object Model
- Xom, a fictional deity in the game Linley's Dungeon Crawl
