= Saint Jacob of Nsibin Syriac Orthodox Cathedral =

Syriac-Orthodox cathedral in Södertälje, Sweden

Coordinates: 59.1810°N 17.5921°E

The Saint Jacob of Nsibin Syriac Orthodox Cathedral is a Syriac Orthodox cathedral in Södertälje, Sweden, located at Hovsjö Industrial Park and governed by the Syriac-Orthodox Archdiocese of Scandinavia. Metropolitan Youhanon Lahdo, successor to Mor Julius Abdulahad Gallo Shabo, resides there. Construction begun in October 2007, and the church was opened on 17 May 2009.
