= Opo people =

Opo
Regions with significant populations
- Ethiopia, South Sudan

Languages
- Opuuo

Related ethnic groups
- Nilotic peoples

Opo is an ethnic group of South Sudan and Ethiopia. They speak Opuuo, a Koman language. Most members of this ethnic group are not Muslims.

The 2007 Census of Ethiopia lists 1,602 individuals as Upo (413 in the Southern Nations, Nationalities, and People's Region (SNNPR) and 990 in the Gambela Region). However, the 1994 census records 271 members of whom 224 lived in the Oromia Region (mostly in the Mirab Shewa Zone), 38 in the SNNPR, and less than ten in either of the other Regions closest to Sudan. A 2014 source placed the population at around 2,000.

Most Opo adhere to Protestant Christianity though traditional beliefs are still prevalent among the community.
