= Opuo language =

Koman language spoken in Ethiopia

Opuuo
- Tʼapo
- Native to: Ethiopia, South Sudan
- Region: Along the Ethiopia–South Sudan border
- Ethnicity: Opo
- Native speakers: 20,000 (2014–2019)
- Language family: Nilo-Saharan?: Komuz?; Koman; Opuuo
- Writing system: Latin

Language codes
- ISO 639-3: lgn
- Glottolog: opuu1239
- ELP: Opuuo

The Opuo (Opuuo, Opo) language, or Tʼapo, is a Koman language spoken by the Opo people of Ethiopia and South Sudan. It has a lexical similarity of 24% with Komo. The language is also called Opo-Shita, Opo, Opuo, Cita, Ciita, Shita (along with Dana), Shiita, Ansita, Kina, and Kwina. The self-name for the language is Tʼapo. "Langa" is a derogatory term for its speakers used by the Anuak.

Ethiopian speakers live in five villages along the South Sudan border north of the Anuak and Nuer, and its South Sudanese in Upper Nile State, around Kigille and Maiwut; however, of the 286 speakers the 1994 Ethiopian Census records, 183 are in the Oromia Region (mostly in the Mirab Shewa Zone), 32 in the Southern Nations, Nationalities, and People's Region, and less than ten in either of the Regions closest to South Sudan.

An early record of this language is a list of 32 village names and a wordlist dated February 1883 by Juan Maria Schuver, where he calls the language "Gambiel".
