= Daatsʼiin language =

B'aga language spoken in Ethiopia

Daatsʼiin
- Native to: Ethiopia
- Region: Benishangul-Gumuz Region
- Ethnicity: Daats'iin
- Native speakers: 300-1000 (2015)
- Language family: Nilo-Saharan?: Komuz?; Bʼaga; Daatsʼiin

Language codes
- ISO 639-3: dtn
- Glottolog: daat1234

Daatsʼiin is a B'aga language of western Ethiopia. There are two communities of speakers in western Ethiopia, one in Mahadid, on the northeast border of Alitash National Park, and one in Inashemsh on the Sudan border, south of the park where the Rahad River crosses from Ethiopia into Sudan.

Daatsʼiin was first reported in 2013 and described by Colleen Ahland in 2014. Ahland has described it further in 2016. A comparative word list of Daatsʼiin, Northern Gumuz, and Southern Gumuz is available in Ahland & Kelly (2014).

Of the other B'aga languages, Daatsʼíin has the greatest lexical similarity to Southern Gumuz, but the two groups communicate in Arabic or Amharic.

== Phonology ==
The consonant inventory of Daatsʼíin:

		Labial	Alveolar	Postalveolar / palatal	Velar	Glottal / pharyngeal
Stops	voiceless	p	t	c	k	ʔ
Stops	voiced	b	d	ɟ	g	
Stops	ejective	pʼ	t'	cʼ	kʼ	
Stops	implosive	ɓ	ɗ			
Affricates	voiceless		ts	tʃ		
Affricates	ejective		tsʼ	tʃʼ		
Fricatives	voiceless	f	s	ʃ		h
Fricatives	voiced	v	z	(ʒ)		(ʕ)
Nasals		m	n		ŋ	
Approximants		w	l	j		
Rhotic			r			

The palatal stops /c/, /ɟ/, /cʼ/ can be also realized as palatalized velar stops [kʲ], [gʲ], [kʲʼ] in free variation.

[v] and [ʒ] are rare, both recorded only from one word so far. The former appears to be phonemic, but the latter might be an allophone of /z/.

The voiced pharyngeal fricative [ʕ] only occurs when following /l/ or /r/ and preceding /a/, and it can be analyzed as an allophone of the glottal stop /ʔ/.

Daatsʼíin has eight vowel phonemes:

	front	central	back	diphthong
close	i(ː)	ɨ	u(ː)	u ~ wɨ
mid	e(ː)	ə	o(ː)	
open		a(ː)		

Ahland analyzes [i], [e], [a], [o], [u] as phonemically long, and [ɨ], [wɨ], [ə] as phonemically short /i/, /u/, /a/ respectively.

Daatsʼíin is also a tonal language: vowels can bear high and low tone. Some examples of downstep occur.

== Grammar ==
Daatsʼíin has several grammatical differences from other Gumuz languages. Verbs inflect for aspect (perfective–imperfective) rather than for tense (future–non-future). Verbs are polysynthetic in all languages, but the order of the morphemes differs in Daatsʼiin, and some morphemes that occur in one language do not occur in the other(s). "The major constituent order in Daatsʼíin clauses tend to be AVO/SV."

== Literature ==
- Ahland, Colleen (2016). "Daatsʼíin, a newly identified undocumented language of western Ethiopia: A preliminary examination". In Payne, Doris L.; Pacchiarotti, Sara; Bosire, Mokaya (eds.). Diversity in African languages. Berlin: Language Science Press. pp. 417–449.
