= Kwama people =

Total population
- c. 13,000

Regions with significant populations
- Ethiopia

Languages
- Kwama

Religion
- Sunni Islam

Kwama pottery for fermenting sorghum paste and brewing beer.

The Kwama (also called Gwama and Komo), are a Nilo-Saharan-speaking community living in the Sudanese-Ethiopian borderland, mainly in the Mao-Komo special woreda of the Benishangul-Gumuz Region in Ethiopia. They belong, culturally and linguistically, to the Koman groups, which include neighboring communities such as the Uduk, Koma, and Opuuo. Although they traditionally occupied a larger territory, they have been forced to move to marginal, lowland areas by the Oromo from the 18th century onwards. In some villages Kwama, Oromo and Berta live together. The Kwama are often called "Mao" by other groups, especially by the Oromo. The people who live in the southern area and near the Sudanese borderland often call themselves "Gwama" and use the term "Kwama" to refer to those living further to the south and in Sudan. These other "Kwama" are usually known by anthropologists as Koma or Komo (Theis 1995). In recent years, many people belonging to this ethnic group have been resettled by the Ethiopian state in order to provide them with clinics and schools.

== Customs ==
The Kwama are swidden cultivators. Their staple food is sorghum, with which they make beer (called shwe or shul depending on the dialect) and porridge (pwash or fash). They also hunt (mostly duiker and warthog), fish, and gather honey. They drink sorghum beer communally with drinking straws from a large pot. Marriage was traditionally by sister exchange, although this custom is now receding. The Kwama are divided into clans, some of which are also divided into sub-clans. It is not allowed to marry a woman or a man from one's own clan. Polygyny is widespread. They have ritual specialists and rainmakers (sid mumun and sid bish), who perform divination and healing ceremonies in huts called swal shwomo. These often have a characteristic bee-hive shape, which is very typical of this ethnic group. For that reason, the Kwama refer to their traditional houses as swal kwama, "swal" meaning "house". Vinigi Grotanelli describes some of them in his study of the Mao (Grottanelli 1940).

The Kwama mainly adhere to Islam and animist traditional beliefs.

== See also ==
- Komuz languages

== Bibliography ==
- Corfield, F.D. (1938): The Koma. Sudan Notes and Records 21: 123–165.
- Grottanelli, V.L. (1940): I Mao. Missione etnografica nel Uollega occidentale. Rome: Reale Accademia d'Italia.
- Grottanelli, V.L. (1947): Burial among the Koma of Western Abyssinia. Primitive Man 20(4): 71–84
- Theis, Joachim: (1995): Nach der Razzia. Ethnographie und Geschichte der Koma, Trickster Verlag, München, Germany ISBN 3-923804-52-0
