= Bʼaga languages =

Language family of the Ethiopia–Sudan border region

Bʼaga
- Gumuz
- Geographic distribution: border of Ethiopia and Sudan
- Ethnicity: Gumuz
- Linguistic classification: Nilo-Saharan?: Komuz?; Bʼaga
- Subdivisions: Northern Gumuz; Yaso?; Southern Gumuz; Daatsʼiin; Kadallu

Language codes
- Glottolog: gumu1250

The Bʼaga languages, also known as Gumuz, form a small language family spoken along the border of Ethiopia and Sudan. They have been tentatively classified as closest to the Koman languages within the Nilo-Saharan language family.

== Languages ==
There are four to five Bʼaga languages. Grammatical forms are distinct between Northern Gumuz and Southern Gumuz. Yaso is at least a divergent dialect, perhaps distinct enough to count as a separate language. Daatsʼiin, discovered in 2013, is closest to Southern Gumuz, while Kadallu in Sudan is attested by only two short word lists.

A comparative word list of Daatsʼiin, Northern Gumuz, and Southern Gumuz is available in Ahland & Kelly (2014). The internal classification appears to be as follows:

- Bʼaga (Gumuzic)
  - Daatsʼiin
  - Gumuz
    - Guba
    - Wenbera
    - Agelo Meti
    - Sira Abay
    - Eastern Gumuz
      - Yaso
      - North Gumuz
        - Metemma
        - Mandura
        - North Dibatʼe

== Classification ==
Dimmendaal (2008) notes that mounting grammatical evidence has made the Nilo-Saharan proposal as a whole more sound since Greenberg proposed it in 1963, but that such evidence has not been forthcoming for Songhay, Koman, and Bʼaga/Gumuz: "very few of the more widespread nominal and verbal morphological markers of Nilo-Saharan are attested in the Coman languages plus Gumuz ... Their genetic status remains debatable, mainly due to lack of more extensive data." (2008:843) And later, "In summarizing the current state of knowledge, ... the following language families or phyla can be identified — ... Mande, Songhai, Ubangian, Kadu, and the Coman languages plus Gumuz." (2008:844)

This "Coman plus Gumuz" is what Greenberg (1963) had subsumed under Koman and what Bender (1989) had called Komuz, a broader family consisting of Gumuz and the Koman languages. However, Bender (2000) separated Gumuz as at least a distinct branch of Nilo-Saharan, and suggested that it might even be a language isolate. Dimmendaal (2000), who tentatively included Koman within Nilo-Saharan, excluded Gumuz as an isolate, as it did not share the tripartite singulative–collective–plurative number system characteristic of the rest of the Nilo-Saharan language families. Ahland (2010, 2012), however, reports that with better attestation, Gumuz does indeed appear to be Nilo-Saharan, and perhaps closest to Koman. It has grammatical forms that resemble what might be expected from an ancestral proto-Nilo-Saharan language. Gumuz may thus help elucidate the family, which is extremely diverse and has been difficult to substantiate.

Dimmendaal, Ahland & Jakobi (2019) summarize earlier work that the evidence "suggests that Gumuz and Koman may indeed form two subgroups within a broader 'Komuz' family" and that "there is some evidence that these two language families may indeed be part of a broader Nilo-Saharan phylum, albeit outliers in the family".

== See also ==
- Gumuz word lists (Wiktionary)
