= Uduk language =

Koman language spoken in Sudan

Uduk
- Tʼwampa
- Native to: Sudan, South Sudan
- Ethnicity: Uduk people
- Native speakers: 22,000 in the Sudans (undated; presumably after 2005)
- Language family: Nilo-Saharan?: Komuz?; Koman; Central Koman; Komo–Uduk; Uduk
- Writing system: Latin

Language codes
- ISO 639-3: udu
- Glottolog: uduk1239

Uduk, also known as Twʼampa (Tʼwampa), is a Koman language spoken in Sudan near the border with Ethiopia. Nearly the entire population fled to a refugee camp in Ethiopia during the Second Sudanese Civil War, but returned to Sudan once fighting stopped. The resurgence of hostilities in the Blue Nile province after 2011 once more resulted in the Uduk community having to enter refugee camps in Ethiopia and South Sudan.

== Phonology ==
=== Consonants ===
| | | Bilabial | Dental | Alveolar | Post-alveolar | Palatal | Velar | Glottal |
|---|---|---|---|---|---|---|---|---|
| Plosive | unaspirated | p pʷ | t̪ [t̪ʷ] | t | | c cʷ | k kʷ | ʔ |
| Plosive | aspirated | pʰ pʰʷ | t̪ʰ | tʰ [tʰʷ] | | cʰ cʰʷ | kʰ kʰʷ | |
| Plosive | ejective | pʼ | t̪ʼ | tʼ tʼʷ | | cʼ cʼʷ | kʼ kʼʷ | |
| Plosive | voiced | b bʷ | d̪ | d dʷ | | ɟ ɟʷ | ɡ ɡʷ | |
| Plosive | implosive | ɓ ɓʷ | | ɗ ɗʷ | | | | |
| Nasal | | m [mʷ] | | n | | ɲ [ɲʷ] | ŋ ŋʷ | |
| Fricative | | (ɸ) | | s | ʃ ʃʷ | | (x) | h |
| Trill | | | | r | | | | |
| Approximant | | | | l | | j | w | |

1. Consonants in parentheses are allophones.
2. Consonants in brackets are rare or marginal.

=== Vowels ===
| | Front | Central | Back |
|---|---|---|---|
| Close | i | | u |
| Mid | ɛ | | ɔ |
| Open | | a | |
