= Shabo people =

Ethnic group in Ethiopia

Shabo
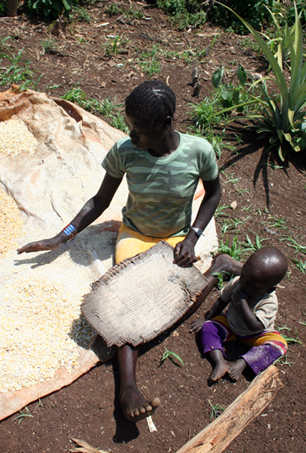

Total population
- 1,000–2,000

Regions with significant populations
- Ethiopia

Languages
- Shabo

Religion
- Predominantly traditional, some influence of Mekane Yesus Evangelical Church

The Shabo (also known as Shako) are an ethnic group of southwestern Ethiopia. The Shabo call themselves "Sabu" and are sometimes called "Mikeyir" by their neighbors. Their language is a language isolate and shows some contact-induced similarities with the Nilo-Saharan, particularly Koman, languages. They live in several dispersed settlements in the regional states of the Gambela Region and the Southern Nations, Nationalities, and People's Region, surrounded by Majangir and Shekkacho peoples, with whom they intermarry.

The Shabo rely on subsistence agriculture and hunting. Shabo society is organized into separate, exogamous clans.

== Culture ==
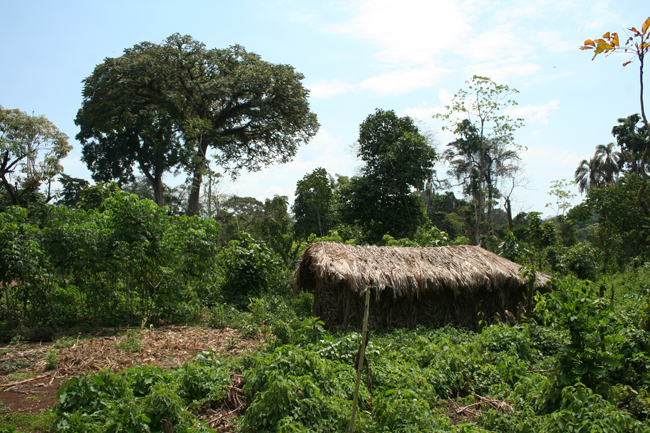
A Shabo house in the village of Yeri (Gambela Region).

Shabo livelihood is based on slash-and-burn or fire-fallow agriculture, although hunting with spears and dogs, fishing, and gathering wild roots and berries play an important role in their economy. Bush meat is transported in a net, called kenken, from the forest to the house and markets. The Shabo live in small cleared plots in the middle of dense forests, which are being gradually deforested by the coffee agribusiness. Their small huts, made with pieces of wood and palm leaves, stand in the middle of the cleared area, surrounded by haphazard cultivation of sorghum and corn. After six or seven years, the plot is left to fallow and a new plot is opened nearby. Among the Majangir, Shabo family units are well spaced out. There are no villages in the usual sense of the term. The Shabo have traditionally exchanged game, fish, skins and honey with the people of the Ethiopian Highlands.

The Shabo claim that Juku (God) created them in the same area that they occupy today and that other groups (like the Majangir and Shekkacho) arrived later to the region. The Shabo have different clans and exogamy is mandatory (either with people from other clans or from other ethnic groups). Traditionally, grooms had to give the bride's father an axe and a spear (for hunting in the forest and gathering honey) to get married. The bride's mother received bracelets.

== Bibliography ==
- Anbessa, T. and P. Unseth, 1989. "Toward the classification of Shabo (Mikeyir)." In M. Lionel Bender (ed.): Topics in Nilo-Saharan linguistics. Nilo-Saharan, 3. Hamburg: Helmut Buske, pp. 405–18.
