= Uduk people =

Total population
- c. 30,000

Regions with significant populations
- Sudan

Languages
- Uduk

Religion
- Islam, Christianity, Traditional religion

The Uduk are a Nilo-Saharan group from southeastern Sudan. They speak Uduk, a Koman language. They call themselves Kwanim Pa and are culturally and linguistically related to neighboring communities, such as the Gumuz and the Kwama from the Sudan-Ethiopia borderland. Due to the Second Sudanese Civil War the Uduk were forced to emigrate to other neighboring countries, especially Ethiopia. Following the peace agreement in 2005, some Uduk have started to return home.

The Uduk adhere to their traditional religion along with Christianity or Islam which incorporates traditional beliefs and practices.
