= Gule language =

Extinct language isolate of Sudan

Gule
- Anej, Fecakomodiyo, Hamej
- Native to: Sudan
- Region: Blue Nile
- Ethnicity: 1,000 (1983)
- Era: last attested 1932
- Language family: Language isolate

Language codes
- ISO 639-3: gly
- Glottolog: gule1241

Gule, also known as Anej, Fecakomodiyo, and Hamej, is an extinct language of Sudan. Although it has been classified as one of the Koman languages, Zamponi (2026) unambiguously identifies Gule as a language isolate. It is poorly attested, and Hammarström judges the evidence to be insufficient for classification as Koman. Others however accept it as Koman, though too poorly attested to be much help in reconstructing that family.

The language was spoken by the inhabitants of Jebel Gule in Blue Nile State, Sudan. Speakers had shifted to Arabic by the late 20th century.

== See also ==
- Gule word lists (Wiktionary)
