= Um Kadada District =

Um Kadada
- District
- Country: Sudan
- State: North Darfur

Population (2008)
  - Total: 93,392

Um Kadada is a district of North Darfur state, Sudan.
