= Shabo language =

Language of southwestern Ethiopia

Shabo
- Chabu
- Mikeyir
- Pronunciation: [tʃabu], [tsabu]
- Native to: Ethiopia
- Region: Eastern South West Region
- Ethnicity: 600 Shabo (2000)
- Native speakers: (400 cited 2000)
- Language family: Language isolate

Language codes
- ISO 639-3: sbf
- Glottolog: shab1252
- ELP: Shabo
- Linguasphere: 05-PEA-aa

Shabo (or preferably Chabu; also called Mikeyir) is an endangered language and likely language isolate spoken by about 400 former hunter-gatherers in southwestern Ethiopia, in the eastern part of the South West Ethiopia Peoples' Region.

It was first reported to be a separate language by Lionel Bender in 1977, based on data gathered by missionary Harvey Hoekstra. A grammar was published in 2015 (Kibebe 2015). Some early treatments classified it as a Nilo-Saharan language (Anbessa & Unseth 1989, Fleming 1991, Blench 2010), but more recent investigation (Kibebe 2015) found none of the grammatical features typical of Nilo-Saharan, and showed that the Nilo-Saharan vocabulary items are loans from Surmic languages (Blench 2019).

== Demographics ==
Shabo speakers live in three places in the Keficho Shekicho Zone: Anderaccha, Gecha, and Kaabo.

As they shift from hunting and gathering to more settled agriculture and to working as laborers, many of its speakers are shifting to other neighboring languages, in particular Majang and Shekkacho (Mocha); its vocabulary is heavily influenced by loanwords from both these languages, particularly Majang, as well as Amharic.

== Classification ==
Once the many loanwords from its immediate neighbors, Majang and Shakicho, are removed, the wordlists collected show a significant number of Koman-like words side by side with a larger number of words with no obvious external relationships. The tentative grammar so far collected offers few obviously convincing external similarities. On this basis, Fleming (1991) has classified Shabo as Nilo-Saharan and, within Nilo-Saharan, as nearest to Koman. Anbessa & Unseth consider it Nilo-Saharan, but present little by way of argument for their position, and no detail on its position within the family. Schnoebelen (2009) in his phylogenetic analysis says that Shabo is best treated as an isolate, but does not exclude the possibility of contradicting evidence gained from applying the comparative method (which still needs to be done); Kibebe (2015) evaluates Schnoebelen as the most rigorous comparison to date. Blench (2010) maintains that Shabo does pattern with the Nilo-Saharan family, and that recent data on Gumuz helped tie the languages together. More recently, Blench (2019) classifies Shabo (Chabu) as a language isolate, noting little evidence for it being part of Nilo-Saharan.

Blench (2017) lists the following similarities among Shabo, Gumuz, and Koman lexical forms.

Gloss	Shabo	Gumuz	Koman
head	kʼoy	Proto-Common Gumuz *kʷa	Proto-Koman *kup
breast	kowan	Proto-Common Gumuz *kúá	Proto-Koman *koy
horn	kulbe	Guba dialect k’əla	Kwama kwaap
sun	ukʰa, oxa	Yaso dialect oka	Komo kʰaala

The comparison with reconstructed languages of the Surmic and Koman branch as well as three languages from the Gumuz branch shows slight phonological similarity for the first person singular of Proto-Southwest Surmic and the probable ancestor of the Gumuz languages but additional information is lacking and, otherwise, so far it does not seem very approximate.

Meaning	Shabo	Proto-Southwest Surmic	Proto-Southeast Surmic	Proto-Koman	Northern Gumuz	Southern Gumuz	Daats'in
I	tiŋŋ, ta, ti	*anɛɛtta	*aɲɲe	*akʰa	áɗa	ára	áɗa
you, sg.	kukk, kuŋg	[?]	*iɲɲV	*ai; *aina?	áma	áam	ámam
he, she	ji, oŋŋa	[?]	[?]	[?]	áχó	áŋa	jáárʔám
we	jiŋŋ, jaŋfu	*aggetta	*agge	*aman, *ana, *min-?	[?]	[?]	[?]
you, pl.	sitalak, silak, subak	*aggitta	[?]	*uma	[?]	[?]	[?]
one	iŋki	*koɗoi	[?]	*ɗe	metáa	metáam	mité
two	bab	*ramma	*ramman	*suk-	[?]	[?]	[?]

The number "iŋki" ("one") has been compared to Saho "inik".

== Phonology ==
The consonants are:

	Bilabial	Alveolar	Palatal	Velar	Glottal
Plosives	(p) b	t d	(tʃ) (dʒ)	k ɡ	ʔ
Implosives	ɓ	ɗ			
Ejectives	pʼ	tʼ	tʃʼ	kʼ	
Fricatives	f	(s) sʼ	(ʃ)		
Approximants	w	l	j		
Nasals	m	n		ŋ	
Trills		r			

Consonants in parentheses are not entirely phonemic according to Teferra (1995):

- [p] and [f] are in free variation
- [s] and [ʃ], and sometimes also [c], [ɟ], and [ʒ], are in free variation, as in Majang; Teferra speculatively links this to the traditional practice of removing the lower incisors of men.
- [h] and [k] occasionally alternate.

Implosive consonants are common in languages of the area, but ejective consonants are not found in Majang.

Consonant length is found in several words, such as walla "goat", kutti "knee"; however, it is often unstable.

Teferra tentatively postulates 9 vowels: /i/ /ɨ/ /u/ /e/ /ə/ /o/ /ɛ/ /a/ /ɔ/, possibly with further distinctions based on advanced tongue root. Five of these, /a/ /e/ /i/ /o/ /u/, have long counterparts. Occasionally final vowels are deleted, shortening medial vowels: e.g. deego or deg "crocodile".

The syllable structure is (C)V(C); all consonants except /pʼ/ and /tʼ/ can occur syllable-finally.

The language is tonal, but its tonology is unclear. Two minimal pairs are cited by Teferra 1995, including há "kill" versus hà "meat".

== Grammar ==
=== Syntax ===
Basic word order is subject–object–verb; there are postpositions rather than prepositions.

=== Pronouns ===
Shabo has an unusually complex pronoun system for Africa:

		Singular	Dual	Plural
1st person	masc.	tiŋŋ, ta, ti	antʃ	jiŋŋ
1st person	fem.	ta	ann	jaŋfu
2nd person	masc.	kukk	tʃitʃak	sitalak, silak
2nd person	fem.	kuŋg	sijak	subak
3rd person	masc.	ji	otʃtʃa	odda
3rd person	fem.	oŋŋa	ojja	otala

The pronouns "I" and "he" have been compared to Surmic languages; however, there are also resemblances in the pronouns with the Gumuz languages (Bender 1983). The gender distinctions made are unusual for Africa.

=== Verbs ===
Negation is by adding the particle be after the verb or noun negated: gumu be "(it is) not (a) stick", ʔam be-gea "he will not come" ("come not-?"). Negative forms in b are widespread in Nilo-Saharan and Afro-Asiatic languages.

There appears to be a causative suffix -ka: mawo hoop "water boiled" → upa mawo hoop-ka "(a) man boiled water".

A particle git (infinitive? subjunctive?) marks the verb in constructions with "want": moopa git inɗeet ("sit git want") "I want to sit".

Much of the verbal morphology is uncertain; there appears to be a 3rd person singular future suffix -g- (e.g. inɗage t'a-g "he will eat") and a 2nd person plural suffix -ɗe

subuk maakɛle kak t'a-ɗe
you-PL corn PAST? eat-2PL
"You (pl.) ate corn"

=== Nouns ===
Plurals are optional; when used, they are formed with a word yɛɛro afterwards.

There is a suffix -ka which sometimes mark the direct object, e.g. upa kaan-ik ye "a man saw a dog" ("man dog saw"), but also has many other uses. A similar suffix is found in many Eastern Sudanic languages, but there it is specifically accusative.

=== Postpositions ===
Shabo uses postpositions after nouns, e.g.: upa mana pond ɗɛpik moi "a man sat on a rock" (lit. "man rock on ? sat").

=== Numbers ===
Number	Original	Borrowed and mixed collocations	Majang
1	iŋki	–	umuŋ
2	bab	–	pej
3	bab eku iŋki	dʒita	dʒit
4	bab eku bab	aŋan	aŋan
5	efi tʃumtʃum	–	tuːl
6	efi tʃumtʃum eku iŋki	tuːl eku iŋki, tula iŋki, tula um	tula um
7	efi tʃumtʃum eku bab	tuːl eku bab, tula bab, tula peej	tula pej
8	efi tʃumtʃum eku bab eku iŋki	efi tʃumtʃum eku dʒita, tuːl eku dʒita, tula dʒit	tula dʒit
9	efi tʃumtʃum eku bab eku bab	efi tʃumtʃum eku aŋan, tuːl eku aŋan, tula aŋan	tula aŋan
10	babif	arin	arin

== Sample sentences ==
mawo hoop: water boiled
upa mawo hoop-ka: A man boiled water (lit. "man water boiled-caus.")
gumu be: it is not a stick (lit. "stick not".)
ma gumu: it is a stick (lit. "stick ?")
dɛrbakan kaal nu ɗe-be: Derbakan does not have a dog (lit. "Derbakan dog poss.? ?:not")
dɛrbakan kaal nu yaaŋk: Derbakan has a dog (lit. "Derbakan dog poss.? positive?")
ʔam be-gea: he will not come (lit. "come not-?")
inɗigi am-k: he will come (lit. "? come ?")
tin-ta be-ge: he will not eat (lit. "? eat not ?")
inɗage t'a-g: he will eat (lit. "? eat ?")
paar bap: two snakes (lit. "snake two")
upa kaan-ik ye: a man saw a dog (lit. "man dog-obj. saw")
kaan upa-k ye: a dog saw a man (lit. "dog man-obj. saw")
koto upa dɛpik ye: a woman saw a man (lit. "woman man tense? saw")
gom c'uwa t'a: fire burned wood (lit. "fire wood ate")
cu ɗɛpik ibalabiyan-an ɗe (word divisions uncertain): you (pl.) came (lit. "you(pl.) ?:? come-2pl.")
subuk maakɛle kak t'a-ɗe: you (pl.) ate corn (lit. "you(pl.) corn aux? eat-2pl.")
wo ka git inɗeet: I want to drink (lit. "drink ? infin.? want")
moopa git inɗeet: I want to sit (lit. "sit ? infin.? want")
abiyaŋge: they came
upa kakaak jaal kaki ye ʔam: I saw the man who came yesterday (lit. "man came yesterday ? saw ?")
upa mana pond ɗɛpik moi: a man sat on a rock (lit. "man rock on aux.? sat")

== See also ==
- Shabo word list (Wiktionary)

== Bibliography ==
- Aberra. 2019. Shabo English Dictionary. With English-Shabo index. Published via Amazon.
- Ahland, Colleen, and Roger Blench, "The Classification of Gumuz and Koman Languages", presented at the Language Isolates in Africa workshop, Lyons, December 4, 2010
- Bender, M. Lionel. 1977. "The Surma Language Group – A Preliminary Report". Studies in African Linguistics, Supplement 7. pp. 11–21.
- Roger Blench (2019), 'Chabu and Kadu: two orphan branches of Nilo-Saharan', Proceedings of Vienna Nilo-Saharan meeting
- Fleming, Harold C. 1991. "Shabo: presentation of data and preliminary classification", in: M. Lionel Bender (ed.), 1991, Proceedings of the Fourth Nilo-Saharan Conference Bayreuth, Aug. 30.
- Kibebe Tshay Taye. 2015. Documentation and grammatical description of Chabu. Doctoral dissertation, Addis Ababa University.
- Schnoebelen, Tyler. 2009. "(Un)classifying Shabo: phylogenetic methods and results". Peter K. Austin, Oliver Bond, Monik Charette, David Nathan & Peter Sells, eds., Proceedings of Conference on Language Documentation and Linguistic Theory 2. London: SOAS. (long version, unpublished )
- Schnoebelen, Tyler. 2009. Classifying Shabo. Presentation at the 40th Annual Conference on African Linguistics (ACAL 40), University of Illinois at Urbana-Champaign, April 9–11, 2009.
- Schnoebelen, Tyler. 2010. Shabo is an isolate. "Language Isolates in Africa" workshop, December 3, 2010. Lyon, France.
- Tefera, Anbessa and Peter Unseth. 1989. "Toward the classification of Shabo (Mikeyir)." In M. Lionel Bender (ed.), Topics in Nilo-Saharan linguistics, 405-18. Nilo-Saharan, 3. Hamburg: Helmut Buske. ISBN 3-87118-927-8 (NISA 3). (This was the primary source for this article.)
- Tefera, Anbessa. 1991. "A Sketch of Shabo Grammar". in: M. Lionel Bender (ed.), 1991, Proceedings of the Fourth Nilo-Saharan Conference Bayreuth, Aug. 30.
- Teferra, Anbessa. 1995. "Brief phonology of Shabo (Mekeyir)". Robert Nicolaï et Franz Rottland, eds., Fifth Nilo-Saharan Linguistics Colloquium. Nice, 24–29 août 1992. Proceedings, pp. 169–193. Köln: Köppe Verlag. Sep. 2, 1989 (Nilo-Saharan 7), Hamburg: Helmut Buske. pp. 29–38.
- Unseth, Peter. 1984. Shabo (Mekeyir). A first discussion of classification and vocabulary. [Unpublished manuscript]
