= Julius Abdulahad Gallo Shabo =

Scandinavian Bishop

Julius Abdulahad Gallo Shabo (born 1951) is an Oriental Orthodox archbishop of the Syriac Orthodox Church for Sweden and Scandinavia. Since 1987, he leads the Syriac Orthodox Archdiocese of Sweden and Scandinavia, whose cathedral is the Saint Jacob of Nsibin Syriac Orthodox Cathedral in Södertälje.

== See also ==
- Christianity in Sweden

== Sources ==
- Leustean, Lucian N., ed. (2014). Eastern Christianity and Politics in the Twenty-First Century. London-New York: Routledge. ISBN 9781317818663.
