= Kwama language =

Koman language of Ethiopia

Kwama
- Gwama
- Native to: Ethiopia
- Region: Benishangul-Gumuz Region
- Ethnicity: 20,000 Kwama
- Native speakers: 15,000 (2015)
- Language family: Nilo-Saharan?: Komuz?; Koman; Kwama
- Writing system: none

Language codes
- ISO 639-3: kmq
- Glottolog: kwam1249
- ELP: Kwama

Kwama (also Afan Mao, Amam, Gogwama, Goma, Gwama, Koma of Asosa, Nokanoka, North Koma, T'wa Kwama, Takwama) is a Koman language, spoken in the South Benishangul-Gumuz region of Ethiopia, along the Sudan border between Asosa and Gidami.

An early record of this language is a wordlist dated March 1882 by Juan Maria Schuver.
