= Er Roseires =

Er Roseires الروصيرص
- Town
- Location in Sudan
- Coordinates: 11°51′N 34°23′E
- Country: Sudan
- State: Blue Nile

Population (2006)
  - Total: 215,857

Er Roseires (Arabic: الروصيرص, romanized: al-Rūṣayriṣ) is a town in eastern Sudan 60 km from the border with Ethiopia.

Lord Prudhoe mentions this town in the 1829 diary he kept while travelling in the Sennar. At the time it was the residence of one Sheikh Suliman, ruler of the lower reach of the Blue Nile (Baḥr al-Azraq), for which he paid 1500 ounces of gold to the Egyptians out of his revenues.

The Roseires Dam is located just upstream of the town.

== Climate ==
El Roseires features a Tropical Savanna Climate (Aw)

Climate data for Ar Rusayris
Month	Jan	Feb	Mar	Apr	May	Jun	Jul	Aug	Sep	Oct	Nov	Dec	Year
Mean daily maximum °C (°F)	36 (97)	37 (99)	39 (102)	40 (104)	38 (100)	35 (95)	32 (90)	31 (88)	32 (90)	36 (97)	37 (99)	36 (97)	36 (97)
Daily mean °C (°F)	26 (79)	27 (81)	29 (84)	31 (88)	31 (88)	28 (82)	26 (79)	26 (79)	26 (79)	28 (82)	27 (81)	26 (79)	28 (82)
Mean daily minimum °C (°F)	15 (59)	17 (63)	19 (66)	22 (72)	23 (73)	22 (72)	21 (70)	20 (68)	20 (68)	20 (68)	23.8 (74.8)	20.8 (69.4)	20.3 (68.6)
Average precipitation mm (inches)	0 (0)	0 (0)	1 (0.0)	13 (0.5)	51 (2.0)	126 (5.0)	167 (6.6)	203 (8.0)	139 (5.5)	34 (1.3)	4 (0.2)	0 (0)	738 (29.1)
Source: Weatherbase
