= Koman languages =

Family of languages used along the Sudan–Ethiopia border

Koman
- Geographic distribution: Ethiopia–Sudan border region
- Native speakers: (undated figure of 50,000)
- Linguistic classification: Nilo-Saharan?: Komuz?; Koman
- Proto-language: Proto-Koman
- Subdivisions: Uduk; Kwama; Komo; Opo; Dana; Gule?

Language codes
- Glottolog: koma1264
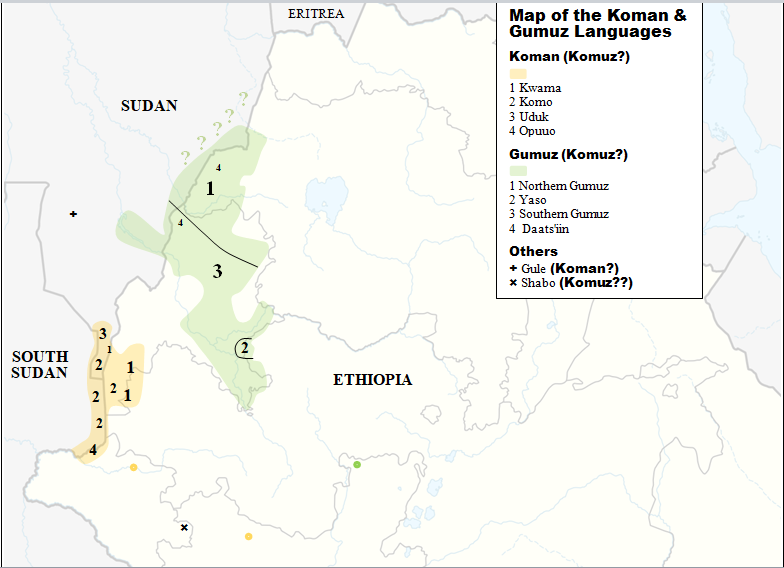

The Koman languages are a small, close-knit family of languages located along the Ethiopia–Sudan border with about 50,000 speakers. They are conventionally classified as part of the Nilo-Saharan family. However, due to the paucity of evidence, many scholars treat it as an independent language family. Among scholars who do accept its inclusion within Nilo-Saharan, opinions vary as to their position within it.

Koman languages in Ethiopia are in close contact with the Omotic Mao languages. In Ethiopia, some Koman-speaking groups also consider themselves to be ethnically Mao.

== Internal classification ==
The Koman languages are:

- Koman
  - Uduk, or T’wampa, (formerly in South Sudan) — about 20,000 speakers, most at a large refugee camp at Bonga, near Gambela
  - Kwama (Ethiopia) — about 15,000 speakers, mainly in Benishangul-Gumuz
  - Komo (Sudan) — about 12,000 speakers mainly in An Nil al Azraq
  - Opuuo (Opo), or Shita (Ethiopia) — spoken in 5 villages north of the Nuer by about 5,000 people
  - Dana, a newly discovered language located near Opo
  - ?Gule (Sudan) — extinct

The poorly known Shabo language (600 speakers) shows strong Koman influence, and it has been suggested (on little evidence) that it may be a Koman language. Gule is sometimes classified as Koman, but this is disputed.

=== Otero (2019) ===
Otero's (2019: 28) internal classification of Koman:

- Koman
  - Gwama
    - Highland Gwama
    - Lowland Gwama
  - Central
    - Komo–Uduk
      - Komo
      - Uduk
        - Chali
        - Yabus
    - Dana–Opo
      - Dana
      - Opo
        - [clade]
          - Bilugu
          - Modin
        - [clade]
          - Pame
          - Kigile

== External classification ==
Dimmendaal (2008) notes that mounting grammatical evidence has made the Nilo-Saharan proposal as a whole more sound since Greenberg proposed it in 1963 but that such evidence has not been forthcoming for Songhay, Gumuz, and Koman: "very few of the more widespread nominal and verbal morphological markers of Nilo-Saharan are attested in the Coman languages plus Gumuz ... Their genetic status remains debatable, mainly due to lack of more extensive data." (2008:843) And later, "In summarizing the current state of knowledge, ... the following language families or phyla can be identified: ... Mande, Songhai, Ubangian, Kadu, and the Coman languages plus Gumuz." (2008:844) However, Ahland (2010) reports that with better attestation, both Koman and Gumuz do appear to be Nilo-Saharan, and perhaps closest to each other.

== Reconstruction ==
Proto-Koman has been reconstructed by Lionel Bender (1983) and Otero (2019).

== Numerals ==
Comparison of numerals in individual languages:

Language	1	2	3	4	5	6	7	8	9	10
Komo (1)	ɗɛ́	sʊ	dìʃ	dɔɡɔ̀n	bùsʼ	káná ɡɪ ɗɛ́ (? + 1)	káná á sʊ (? + 2)	káná á dìʃ (? + 3)	káná á dɔɡɔ̀n (? + 4)	kʼɔ́ʃ kʼɔ̀lɔ̀
Komo (2)	ɗe(d) / ɗɛʔ (SIL)	suʔin / sʊʔ (SIL)	dícin / dǐʃǐn (SIL)	dōɡɔne(n) / dɔ̄ɣɔ́n (SIL)	busín / bʊ̀sʼín (SIL)	kɛnɡɪɗe / kàːnaɡǐɗɛ́ (SIL)	kɛnnɛsɔ / kàːnàsʊʔ (SIL)	kɛnnɛdiʃ / kàːnàdɪʃ (SIL)	kɛnnɛdɔɡɔn / káːndɔ̀ɡɔ̀n (SIL)	kɔʃinkwolo / kʼɔ́ʃkʼɔ̀lɔ̀ (SIL)
Gwama (Kwama) (1)	sóndò /sɛ́ːnɛ́ /sɛ́ːsʼkìn	sùjá	twásɛ̀n	béːsʼìn	kúːmùtʼ	kúbà-sèːn ('takes/lends/brings one')	kúbá-sùjá ('takes/lends/brings two')	kúbà-twásɛ̄n ('takes/lends/br. three')	kúb-béːsʼín ('takes/lends/brings four')	kʼúːzí (lit: 'fingers')
Gwama (Kwama) (2)	sɛ́ɛ́kʼín	swíjá	twàsɛ́n	béésʼín	kómòtʼ	kúpà-sɛ́n (litː ? + 1)	kúpà-swíjá (litː ? + 2)	kúpà-twàsɛ̄n (litː ? + 3)	kúpà-béésʼín (litː ? + 4)	kʼoosʼi
Kwama (Asosa) (3)	seːko ~ se:ndo / ʔāˈsɛ́n~ ʔāsɛ́l (SIL)	siːya / ˈsíjá (SIL)	twazan ~ twasan / ˈtʷāsán (SIL)	mbisiːna ~ beːsen / bēːsīn (SIL)	kʷʊmbut ~ kombɔt / ˈkʰūːmùt (SIL)	kʊmpasɛnde / ˈkōbāsín (SIL)	kʊmpa-siːya / kōbə̄ˈsìa (SIL)	kʊmpa-twasən / kōbə̄ˈtʷàsɪn (SIL)	kʊmpa-n-beːsina / kōˈbeːéːsīn (SIL)	kʊʃʊmbiːt ~kwuːzia / ˈkūːzi (SIL)
Opuuo (Tʼapo) (3)	ɗɛ̄n~dɛ̄ (contraction)	sʊ̄kʼá	tùsù	ʍàn	mùtá-kʼʊ̄j (litː 'be.full-hand')	kān-ɪ́-ɗɛ̄, contraction, (lit: five-ASC-one / five-ASC-one)	kān-ɪ́-sʊ̄kʼá (litː' five-ASC-two')	kān-ɪ́-tùsù (litː' five-ASC-three')	kān-ɪ́-ʍàn (litː' five-ASC-four')	kʼʊ̄j-ā-sʊ̄kʼ-ɛ́n (litː 'hand-LOC-two- 3N.POSS')
Opuuo (Shita) (4)	ɗán / ɗíán	sùkʼá	tùsú	hwán	mùtá-kʼʷèj (litː 'one hand')	kánè-ɗéé	kánè-sùkʼá	kánè-tùsú	kánè-hʷán	mútá-kʼʷùjá-sùkʼén ('two hands')
Opuuo (Shita) (5)	diʃeɗe	ʃuka / cuka	tuʃu / tusu	hwan / ŋwan	mutaːkwei (one hand) ?	kane-ɗe	kane-ʃuka	kane-tūʃū	kane-hwān	muta-kweya-ʃuka-yen (two hands) ?
Uduk (Twampa) (1)	ɗéʔ	súʔ	kʷārā	dòŋ(ɡ)òn	múd̻èɗ (lit: 'hand closed')	múd̻èɗ pé ɗéʔ (5+ 1)	múd̻èɗ pé súʔ (5+ 2)	múd̻èɗ pé(ŋ) kʷārā (5+ 3)	múd̻èɗ pé dòŋ(ɡ)òn (5+ 4)	ʼkúmèɗ
Uduk (2)	ɗe	suʔ	kwara	doŋon	mudheɗ (lit: hand closed)	(mudheɗ) peɗe (5+ 1)	(mudheɗ) pesuʔ (5+ 2)	(mudheɗ) pekwara (5+ 3)	(mudheɗ) pedoŋon (5+ 4)	kumeɗ

== See also ==
- List of Proto-Koman reconstructions (Wiktionary)
