= Komuz languages =

Komuz
- Geographic distribution: Sudan–Ethiopia border region
- Linguistic classification: Nilo-Saharan?: Komuz
- Subdivisions: Koman; Bʼaga (Gumuz); ? Shabo

Language codes
- Glottolog: None

The Komuz languages are a proposed branch of the Nilo-Saharan language family which would include the Koman languages, the Gumuz languages and the Shabo language, all spoken in south-eastern Sudan and western Ethiopia.

== History ==
Nilo-Saharan specialists have vacillated on a genealogical relationship between the Koman and Gumuz languages, a relationship called Komuz. Greenberg (1963) had included Gumuz in the Koman language family. Bender (1989, 1991) classified them together in a distant relationship he called Komuz, but by 1996 he had reversed himself, though he kept both groups in core Nilo-Saharan. Dimmendaal (2008) kept them together, though expressed doubts over whether they belonged in Nilo-Saharan, later referring to Gumuz as an isolate (2011). Ahland (2010, 2012), on the basis of new Gumuz data, resurrected the hypothesis. Blench (2010) independently came to the same conclusion and suggested that the Shabo language might be a third, outlying branch. The classification of Shabo is difficult because of a strong Koman influence on the language that is independent of any genealogical relationship between them. Schnoebelen (2009), moreover, sees Shabo as a likely isolate.

== Languages ==
Shabo is included per Blench (2010).

- Komuz
    - Koman
    - Gumuz
  - Shabo
