= Kafa Biosphere Reserve =

Biosphere reserve in Ethiopia

- Location within Ethiopia
- Location: Keffa Zone, South West Ethiopia Peoples' Region, Ethiopia
- Nearest city: Bonga
- Coordinates: 7°30′13.1″N 35°47′42.8″E
- Area: 2,193.25 km^{2} (846.82 sq mi)
- Designation: UNESCO-MAB Biosphere Reserve
- Designated: 2010
- Governing body: Ethiopian Biodiversity Institute (EBI)

The Kafa Biosphere Reserve is located in the Kafa Zone of Ethiopia approximately 460 km southwest of Addis Ababa. The Bonga National Forest Priority Area partly forms the southern boundary of the Biosphere Reserve, whilst the eastern boundary follows the Adiyo Woreda with the Gojeb River and Gewata-Yeba (Boginda) National Forest Priority Area forming the northern boundary.

It was declared in 2010 and has a surface area of 760,114.1 hectares. It has a population of 608 227 people. It is administered by Kafa Zone Administration, in association with Adiyo Woreda, Bita Woreda, Chena Woreda, Cheta Woreda, Decha Woreda, Gesha Woreda, Gewata Woreda, Gimbo Woreda, Sayilem Woreda, Telo Woreda, and Bonga Town Administration.

== Ecological characteristics ==
The Kafa Biosphere Reserve is located in the Kafa Zone of Ethiopia approximately 460 km southwest of Addis Ababa.

The Bonga National Forest Priority Area partly forms the southern boundary of the Biosphere Reserve, whilst the eastern boundary follows the Adiyo Woredawith the Gojeb River and Gewata-Yeba (Boginda) National Forest Priority Area forms the northern boundary.

The Saylem Woreda forms the northern part of the Biosphere Reserve and the western boundary constitutes the Gesha National Forest Priority Area. The Kafa Zone contains more than 50% of the remaining montane forests in Ethiopia and it is the center of origin and genetic diversity of wild Coffea arabica.

=== Flora ===
Kafa Biosphere Reserve contains 244 plant species that are vascular plants such as trees, shrubs, and wild coffees. Some plant species that are recorded as 110 are commonly endemic throughout the forested area. The vegetation of the reserve is covered with bamboo forests, cloud forests, floodplain forests, riverine wetlands, and Afromontane forests. The Afromontane forests are more species-diverse while the floodplains and wetlands feature a higher diversity of plant species. Coffea arabica, Phoenix reclinata, and Dracaena afromontana are the most common plant species known in Kafa Biosphere Reserve. Along with other plant life, Aframomum corrorima, Bothriocline schimperi, Clematis longicaudata, Erythrina brucei, Millettia ferruginea, Tiliacora troupinii, and Vepris dainellii are recorded as endemic species of Ethiopian Highlands.

== Wildlife ==
=== Mammals ===
Kafa Biosphere Reserve is home to 300 species of mammals consisting of bats, rodents, carnivorans, monkeys, and even-toed ungulates. Herbivores that are recorded from the biome includes hippo, Cape buffalo, bohor reedbuck, Harvey's duiker, crested porcupine, grey duiker, warthog, giant forest hog, bushpig, and waterbuck. Lion is considered one of the most enigmatic species found within the reserve. Other carnivores such as leopard, spotted hyena, slender mongoose, white-tailed mongoose, Egyptian mongoose, marsh mongoose, civet, common genet, black-backed jackal, honey badger, and common jackal are also recorded here. Guereza, Boutourlini's blue monkey, lesser galago, olive baboon, grivet, and De Brazza's monkey are six known primate species that are considered common and can be found in montane forests, bamboo forests, and cloud forests. Insectivores such as aardvark, and four-toed hedgehog are lived here within the biome.

Small mammals such as East African mole-rat (Tachyoryctes Splendens), brush-furred mouse (Lophuromys Flavopunctatus), African marsh rat (Dasymys cf. Incomtus), African clawless otter (Aonyx Capensis), African giant shrew (Crocidura Olivieri), Yellow-spotted rock hyrax (Heterohyrax Brucei), Rock hyrax (Procavia capensis), and Gambian sun squirrel (Heliosciurus Gambianus) are found in wetlands and forest habitats. Along with other small mammals, Mahomet mouse (Mus Mahomet), Ethiopian hare (Lepus cf. Fagani), Ethiopian white-footed mouse (Stenocephalemys Albipes), and Ethiopian vlei rat (Otomys cf. Typus) are four endemic rodent species found in biosphere reserve. 29 bat species are also recorded within caves of the reserve that are listed from Horseshoe bats, Fruit bats, Long-fingered bats, and Mouse-eared bats. Scott's mouse-eared bat, Ethiopian big-eared bat, Ejeta's house bat, and Ethiopian woolly bat are rare endemic bat species recorded in the reserve and are considered endangered for their population.

=== Avifauna ===
Kafa Biosphere Reserve is also home to 178 species of birds that are endemic, endangered, near-threatened, or restricted. Some bird species are restricted to 27 species from the Afro-tropical highlands and the Somali-Masai biome. Yellow-fronted Parrot, Abyssinian Longclaw, and Abyssinian Catbird are three endemic species found in the Kaffa reserve. Wattled Ibis, Rouget's rail, Black-winged Lovebird, White-cheeked Turaco, Banded Barbet, Abyssinian Slaty Flycatcher, and Thick-billed Raven are near-endemic within the reserve. Along with endemic bird species, the Kafa Biosphere reserve provides a home for diverse species of birds such as African Crowned eagle, Black crowned crane, Red-billed oxpecker, Sharpe's starling, Half-collared Kingfisher, Silvery-cheeked Hornbill, Rüppell's robin-chat, and Wattled crane.

=== Herpetofauna ===
17 species of Amphibians are recorded in the Kafa Biosphere Reserve along with 5 species of reptiles. The reptiles species such as Somali giant blind snake, Forest cobra, Wingate's skink, and speckle-lipped skink are found in the wetlands and forested areas of the reserve. Böhme's Ethiopian Mountain Snake (Pseudoboodon boehmei) is the only known endemic reptile found in the reserve. Most Amphibian species are considered vulnerable to habitat loss and deforestation. Frog species such as Clarke’s banana frog (Afrixalus Clarkeorum), Ragazzi's tree frog (Leptopelis Ragazzii), Vannutelli's tree frog (Leptopelis Vannutellii), Largen’s dwarf puddle frog (Phrynobatrachus Inexpectatus), Erlanger's Grassland frog (Ptychadena Erlangeri), and Beccari’s giant frog (Conraua Beccarii) are six endemic species found in Ethiopia.

== Human activities ==
The Biosphere Reserve includes the East Afromontane Biodiversity Hotspot and other endemic crops such as Ensete ventricosum and Eragrostis tef, and a cultural and linguistic identity quite distinct from the rest of Africa.

Furthermore, it includes a unique coffee culture that is deeply ingrained in the Ethiopian economy and history.

The area includes an array of rural settlements, traditional land-use patterns, and sites of cultural and natural significance, which are home to approximately 608 227 people.

Main economic activities in the area are dominated by agriculture which contributes approximately 41% to the GDP, 80% of exports, and 80% of the labor force. Other sectors include services and tourism, manufacturing, and trade. Agriculture forms the backbone of the economy with most of the other sectors (i.e. trade and tourism) being dependent on its strong backward and forward linkages.

The key management focal areas of the Biosphere Reserve include coordination of conservation initiatives with the focus on the protection of the endemic and global important genetic resources of Coffea arabica and its associated ecosystems, provision of a sustained flow of high-quality water to adjoining regions, and the promotion of sustainable development to alleviate poverty and inequality.

== Sources ==
This article incorporates text from a free content work. Licensed under CC BY-SA IGO 3.0 (license statement/permission). Text taken from UNESCO - MAB Biosphere Reserves Directory, UNESCO, UNESCO.
