= Isara Tocha =

Coordinates: 7°00′N 36°55′E

Isara Tocha was one of the 77 woredas in the Southern Nations, Nationalities, and Peoples' Region of Ethiopia. Part of the Dawro Zone, Isara Tocha was bordered on the south by the Omo River which separates this woreda from the Gamo Gofa Zone, on the west by the Konta special woreda, on the north by the Gojeb River which separates it from the Oromia Region, on the east by Mareka Gena, and on the southeast by Loma Bosa. Towns in Isara Tocha included Bale and Tocha. Isara Tocha was separated to Isara and Tocha woredas.

== Overview ==
Isara Tocha is part of a region characterized by hills, and is not suitable for grazing or cultivation, but farmers cultivate the sloping land, leading to erosion and reduced soil fertility. Important food crops in this woreda include enset, sweet potatoes, taro and beans, while important cash crops are maize, teff and pulses.

Isara Tocha was selected by the Ministry of Agriculture and Rural Development in 2004 as one of several woredas for voluntary resettlement for farmers from overpopulated areas, becoming the new home for a total of 6800 heads of households and 26,640 total family members.

== Demographics ==
Based on figures published by the Central Statistical Agency in 2005, this woreda has an estimated total population of 131,553, of whom 67,555 were men and 63,998 were women; 4,556 or 3.46% of its population are urban dwellers, which is less than the Zone average of 8.5%. With an estimated area of 1,838.60 square kilometers, Isara Tocha has an estimated population density of 71.6 people per square kilometer, which is less than the Zone average of 156.5.

The 1994 national census reported a total population for this woreda of 92,667 of whom 45,109 were males and 47,558 were females; 2,514 or 2.71% of its population were urban dwellers. The four largest ethnic groups reported in Isara Tocha were the Kullo (93.36%), the Konta (3.33%), the Kaffa (1.53%), and the Amhara (1.19%); all other ethnic groups made up 0.59% of the population. Kullo is spoken as a first language by 94.38%, 3.15% Konta, and 1.82% speak Kafa; the remaining 0.65% spoke all other primary languages reported.

Concerning religious beliefs, the 1994 census reported that 60.68% of the population said they observed traditional religions, 34.33% practiced Ethiopian Orthodox Christianity, and 4.55% were Protestants.
