= Menjiwo =

District in Ethiopia

Coordinates: 7°15′N 36°35′E

Menjiwo is a district in the South West Region of Ethiopia. The name Menjiwo is derived from the province Manjo of the Kingdom of Kaffa; however, the province of Manjo lay within the boundaries of neighboring Ginbo, while Menjiwo occupies the lands of the Gallo province of the former kingdom. Part of the Keffa Zone, Menjiwo is bordered on the south by Telo, on the southwest by Decha, on the west by Ginbo, on the north by the Gojeb River which separates it from the Oromia Region, and on the east by the Konta special district. The major town in Menjiwo is Adiya Kaka.

This district has been described as "one of the most isolated zones in the Region, with most kebeles inaccessible by road throughout the year." According to a 2004 report, Menjiwo had 56 kilometers of dry-weather roads, for an average road density of 53 kilometers per 1000 square kilometers. Despite the lack of all-weather roads, this district possesses "a largely self-contained economy, not wealthy, but economically secure. Major cash crops include corn, teff, wheat, and haricot beans. Other important sources of income include selling butter.

== Demographics ==
Based on the 2007 Census conducted by the CSA, this district has a total population of 107,731, of whom 52,405 are men and 55,326 women; 2,858 or 2.65% of its population are urban dwellers. The majority of the inhabitants practiced Ethiopian Orthodox Christianity, with 91.4% of the population reporting that belief, 3.86% were Protestants, and 3.21% practiced traditional beliefs.

In the 1994 national census Menjiwo had a population of 71,575, of whom 34,953 were men and 36,622 women; 1,145 or 1.6% of its population were urban dwellers. The four largest ethnic groups reported in this district were the Kafficho (91.24%), the Kullo (5.04%), the Amhara (1.27%), and the Konta (0.85%); all other ethnic groups made up 1.6% of the population. Kafa was spoken as a first language by 89.29% of the inhabitants, 7% spoke Kullo, 1.55% Konta, and 1.25% spoke Oromiffa; the remaining 0.91% spoke all other primary languages reported. Concerning education, 11.86% of the population were considered literate; 5.62% of children aged 7–12 were in primary school; 0.42% of the children aged 13–14 were in junior secondary school; and 0.14% of the inhabitants aged 15–18 were in senior secondary school. Concerning sanitary conditions, about 40.96% of the urban houses and 7.63% of all houses had access to safe drinking water at the time of the census, while about 33.58% of the urban and 7.84% of the total had toilet facilities.
