= Telo (district) =

District in Ethiopia

Coordinates: 7°00′N 36°20′E

Telo is a district in the South West Region of Ethiopia. The capital city is Oda. This district has its origins in the province Chetta of the former Kingdom of Kaffa. Part of the Keffa Zone, Telo is bordered on the south by Cheta, on the west by Decha, on the north by Menjiwo, and on the east by the Konta special district. Towns in Telo include Felege Selam. Cheta district was separated from Telo. In Telo district there are many tourism areas such as shinat ino, boreta valley (washa), shada earth ear (ye meret joro), the 18th Kafa cemetery (mekane mekabr). In Telo there are 24 kebele and one district administration.

== Demographics ==
Based on the 2007 census conducted by the CSA,, Telo had a population of 63,252, of whom 31,387 were men and 31,865 women; 3,509 or 5.55% of its population were urban dwellers. The majority of the inhabitants practiced Ethiopian Orthodox Christianity, with 91.7% of the population reporting that belief, 4.89% practiced traditional beliefs, and 2.2% were Protestants.

In the 1994 national census Telo had a population of 76,241, of whom 37,564 were men and 38,677 women; 1,942 or 2.55% of its population were urban dwellers. The four largest ethnic groups reported in this district were the Kafficho (95.28%), the Kullo (1.97%), the Chara (1.33%), and the Amhara (1.01%); all other ethnic groups made up 0.41% of the population. Kafa was spoken as a first language by 96.08% of the inhabitants, 1.91% spoke Kullo, 1.33% Chara, and 0.46% spoke Amharic; the remaining 0.22% spoke all other primary languages reported. Concerning education, 12.82% of the population were considered literate; 6.87% of children aged 7–12 were in primary school; 1.78% of the children aged 13–14 were in junior secondary school; and 0.44% of the inhabitants aged 15–18 were in senior secondary school. Concerning sanitary conditions, about 25.77% of the urban houses and 5.72% of all houses had access to safe drinking water at the time of the census, while about 71.16% of the urban and 6.80% of the total had toilet facilities.
