= Decha =

District in Ethiopia

Coordinates: 6°50′N 36°10′E

Decha is a district in the South West Region of Ethiopia. The name Decha comes from one of the provinces in the former Kingdom of Kaffa, which had approximately the same boundaries. Part of the Keffa Zone, Decha is bordered on the south by the Omo River which separates it from the Debub Omo Zone, on the west by the Bench Maji Zone, on the northwest by Chena, on the north by Ginbo, on the northeast by Menjiwo, on the west by Telo and Cheta, and on the southeast by the Denchya River which separates it from the Konta special district. The major town in Decha is Chiri.

According to a 2004 report, Decha had 47 kilometers of all-weather roads and 5 kilometers of dry-weather roads, for an average road density of 18 kilometers per 1000 square kilometers. The southern tip of Decha is included in the territory of the Omo National Park.

== Demographics ==
Based on the 2007 Census conducted by the CSA, this district has a total population of 128,887, of whom 64,438 are men and 64,449 women; 5,460 or 4.24% of its population are urban dwellers. Most inhabitants practiced Ethiopian Orthodox Christianity, with 63.9% of the population reporting that belief, 15.75% were Protestants, 14.3% practiced traditional beliefs, 3.51% embraced Catholicism, and 2.18% were Muslim.

In the 1994 national census, Decha had a population of 74,792, of whom 36,964 were men and 37,828 women; 1,655 or 2.21% of its population were urban dwellers. The five largest ethnic groups reported in this district were the Kafficho (78.23%), the Bench (7.69%), the Chara (5.57%), the Nao (5.13%), and the Me'en (1.81%); all other ethnic groups made up 1.57% of the population. Kafa was spoken as a first language by 78.67% of the inhabitants, 8.15% spoke Bench, 5.5% Chara, 4.62% Nayi, and 1.24% spoke Me'en; the remaining 1.82% spoke all other primary languages reported. Concerning education, 15.88% of the population were considered literate; 9.91% of children aged 7–12 were in primary school; 2.36% of the children aged 13–14 were in junior secondary school; and 0.73% of the inhabitants aged 15–18 were in senior secondary school. Concerning sanitary conditions, about 11.24% of the urban houses and 60.05% of all houses had access to safe drinking water at the time of the census. In comparison, about 9.83% of the urban and 73.45% of the total had toilet facilities.
