= Mareka Gena =

Coordinates: 7°10′N 37°10′E

Mareka Gena was one of the 77 woredas in the Southern Nations, Nationalities, and Peoples' Region of Ethiopia. Part of the Semien Omo Zone, Mareka Gena was a triangle-shaped area located south of the confluence of the Omo River and its east-flowing tributary the Gojeb River, bordered on the southeast by Loma Bosa, on the west by Isara Tocha, and on the north by the Oromia Region. Towns in Mareka Gena included Wacca and Weldehane. Mareka Gena was divided for Gena Bosa and Mareka woredas.

== Demographics ==
Based on figures published by the Central Statistical Agency in 2005, this woreda has an estimated total population of 125,532, of whom 63,723 were men and 61,809 were women; 8,405 or 6.70% of its population are urban dwellers, which is less than the Zone average of 8.5%. With an estimated area of 875.78 square kilometers, Mareka Gena has an estimated population density of 143.3 people per square kilometer, which is less than the Zone average of 156.5.

The 1994 national census reported a total population for this woreda of 87,786 of whom 43,234 were males and 44,552 were females; 4,639 or 5.28% of its population were urban dwellers. The two largest ethnic groups reported in Mareka Gena were the Kullo (96.57%), and the Amhara (1.12%); all other ethnic groups made up 2.31% of the population. Kullo was spoken as a first language by 97.42% of the inhabitants; the remaining 2.58% spoke all other primary languages reported. Concerning religious beliefs, the 1994 census reported that 41.85% of the population said they observed traditional religions, 37.95% practiced Ethiopian Orthodox Christianity, and 19.44% were Protestants.
