= Gesa =

Gesa is a given name. Notable people with the name include:

- Gesa Ederberg (born 1968), German rabbi
- Gesa Felicitas Krause (born 1992), German athlete
- Gesa Hansen (born 1981), German-Danish designer
- Gesa Weyhenmeyer (born 1969), Swedish limnologist

== See also ==
- Gese (disambiguation)
