= Ginbo =

Coordinates: 7°20′N 36°10′E

Ginbo (also spelled Gimbo) is a district in the South West Region of Ethiopia. The name Ginbo comes from one of the provinces in the former Kingdom of Kaffa. That province, as well as the Kafficho provinces Bonga and Manjo, became districts with the Ethiopian conquest in 1896, and these districts were later merged to form the modern district.

Part of the Keffa Zone, Ginbo is bordered on the south by Decha, on the west by Chena, on the northwest by Gewata, on the north by the Gojeb River which separates it from the Oromia Region, and on the east by Menjiwo. Towns in Ginbo include Diri, Gojeb, Ufa and Wushwush. Ginbo surrounds Bonga town. The western part of Ginbo was used to create Gewata district.

== Overview ==
The primary food crops include enset and maize; other staple foods include wheat and barley. A major cash crop in this district is tea; there is a large tea plantation at Wushwush. Notable landmarks include a Christian monastery 12 kilometers from Bonga which dates to 1550, and the Bonga Forest Reserve covering some 500 square kilometers of the surrounding hillsides.

Ginbo was selected by the Ministry of Agriculture and Rural Development in 2004 as one of several districts for voluntary resettlement for farmers from overpopulated areas, becoming the new home for a total of 7800 heads of households and 31,200 total family members.

== Demographics ==
Based on the 2007 Census conducted by the CSA, this district has a total population of 89,892, of whom 44,774 are men and 45,118 women; 9,611 or 10.69% of its population are urban dwellers. The majority of the inhabitants practiced Ethiopian Orthodox Christianity, with 87.17% of the population reporting that belief, 5.14% were Muslim, 4.01% were Protestants, and 3.14% embraced Catholicism.

In the 1994 national census Ginbo had a population of 99,847, of whom 49,364 were men and 50,483 women; 17,976 or 18% of its population were urban dwellers. The three largest ethnic groups reported in this district were the Kafficho (76.74%), the Amhara (15.19%), and the Oromo (4.25%); all other ethnic groups made up 3.82% of the population. Kafa was spoken as a first language by 76.49% of the inhabitants, 18% spoke Amharic, and 3.16% spoke Oromiffa; the remaining 2.35% spoke all other primary languages reported. Concerning education, 36.29% of the population were considered literate; 25.8% of children aged 7–12 were in primary school; 13.05% of the children aged 13–14 were in junior secondary school; and 7.81% of the inhabitants aged 15–18 were in senior secondary school. Concerning sanitary conditions, about 50.28% of the urban houses and 21.90% of all houses had access to safe drinking water at the time of the census, while about 67.08% of the urban and 24.95% of the total had toilet facilities.
