= Loma (woreda) =

- Woreda
- Izwe: Ethiopia

Population (2007)
  - Total: 109,192
- Time zone: UTC+3 (EAT)

Loma is one of the woredas in the South West Ethiopia Peoples' Region of Ethiopia. Part of the Dawro Zone, Loma is bordered on the south by the Gamo Gofa Zone, on the west by Isara, on the northwest by Mareka, on the north by Gena Bosa, and on the east by the Wolayita Zone. The eastern and southern border of Loma is marked by the Omo River. Towns in Loma include Loma Bale. Loma was part of former Loma Bosa woreda.

== Demographics ==
Based on the 2007 Census conducted by the CSA, this woreda has a total population of 109,192, of whom 55,214 are men and 53,978 women; 3,999 or 3.66% of its population are urban dwellers. The majority of the inhabitants were Protestants, with 64.35% of the population reporting that belief, 24.06% practiced Ethiopian Orthodox Christianity, 8.31% embraced Catholicism, and 2.35% practiced traditional beliefs.
