= Coralie Clément =

French singer (born 1978)

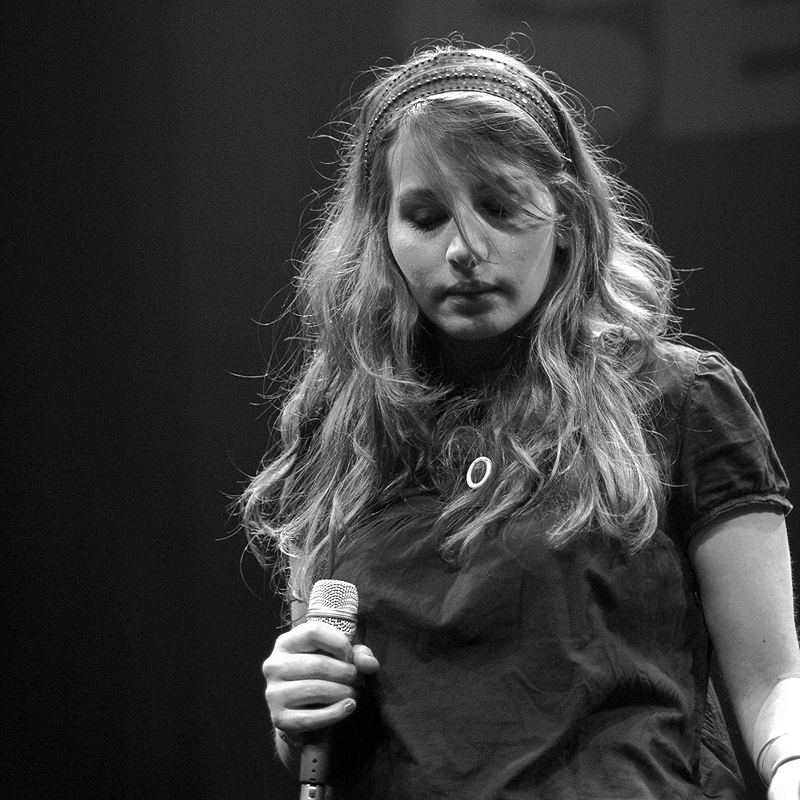
- Coralie Clément on stage in São Paulo, Brazil in June 2009

Background information
- Born: Coralie Biolay; 1 September 1978 (age 48)
- Origin: Villefranche-sur-Saône, Rhône, France
- Genres: French Pop; Chanson; Bossa Nova
- Years active: 2000–present
- Labels: Nettwerk; EMI

Coralie Clément (born Coralie Biolay; 1 September 1978 in Villefranche-sur-Saône, Rhône) is a French singer.

== Biography ==
Clément was born into a family of musicians, her father a clarinetist, and studied the violin from the age of six but later quit. Her brother, Benjamin Biolay, also a singer, has written for Henri Salvador and wrote for and produced her own debut, as well as its follow-up. Among her claimed inspirations are Serge Gainsbourg, Françoise Hardy, Jane Birkin. She recorded her first album while studying history at university.

Clément sang the song "Dorénavant," used as the theme of the film L'Idole by Samantha Lang, starring Leelee Sobieski. A song from her first album was used in the soundtrack of the movie Something's Gotta Give starring Diane Keaton and Jack Nicholson.

In 2001, she released her first album, Salle des Pas Perdus. This album is a collaborative effort between her and her brother, Benjamin Biolay, who wrote and arranged 10 of the 12 songs. Her second album, Bye bye beauté, was released in 2005 and features songs that are more pop and rock oriented than those of Salle des Pas Perdus, and was also produced by her brother.

== Discography ==
- Salle des pas perdus (2001)
- Bye bye beauté (2005)
- Toystore (2008)
- Iris a 3 ans (2013). Audio book for children, released under her birth name with designer Gesa Hansen
- La belle Affaire (2014)
