= Chena =

Chena may refer to:

- Chena (root), an Indian food
- Chena, Alaska
- Chena Hot Springs, Alaska
- Chena River, Alaska
- Chena, Ethiopia, a woreda or administrative government unit
- Huaca de Chena, sacred Inca place near Santiago de Chile
- Tropical forest or woodland subject to shifting cultivation
- Chenna massacre, civilian deaths during the Tigray War in Ethiopia in 2021
- Chhena, cheese curds on the Indian subcontinent
- Chena Black, Miss Continental 1983
