= Amaya, Ethiopia =

Town in Ethiopia

Amaya
- Town
- Location within Ethiopia
- Coordinates: 7°06′21″N 36°40′36″E
- Country: Ethiopia
- Region: South West Ethiopia Peoples' Region
- Zone: Konta Zone

Population
  - Total: 13,594
- Time zone: UTC+3 (East Africa Time)

Amaya or Ameya is town and separate district in southwestern Ethiopia. Amaya serves as the administrative seat of Konta Zone and Amaya Zuria district of Southwestern Ethiopia Regional State. Amaya is a home of Konta people and located in 467 km southwest from Addis Ababa.

== Infrastructures ==
Amaya has various infrastructures; such as pure drinking water, health institutions and electric service, public market services, hotels and restaurant services, banks and telecommunication services.
