= Waka, Ethiopia =

Wacca Waka
- Location within Ethiopia
- Coordinates: 7°4′N 37°10′E
- Country: Ethiopia
- Region: South West Ethiopia Peoples' Region
- Zone: Dawro
- Elevation: 2,220 m (7,280 ft)

Population (2005)
  - Total: 3,439
- Time zone: UTC+3 (EAT)

Wacca or Waka is a town in southwest Ethiopia. Located in the Dawro Zone of the South West Ethiopia Peoples' Region. This town has a latitude and longitude of 7°04′N 37°10′E with an elevation of 2220 meters above sea level. It is the largest town in Mareka woreda.

Wacca is reported as having a telephone station in the 1930s, but this service had vanished by 1994. Two roads connecting the town to the outside world, one to Chida 73 kilometers in length and the other to Sodo 75 kilometers long, were under construction by 1996. The contractor was the Italian firm of Salini Costruttori. These roads were completed in late 1998/early 1999. The town is also served by an airport (IATA: HAWC, ICAO: WAC).

== History ==
Arnold Weinholt Hodson visited Wacca when he was the British resident in southern Ethiopia (1914-1923), where he shared a meal with a local chief which he obviously did not enjoy:

I had to go through the ordeal of a meal with him for the sake of policy, and it is an ordeal. They cook very fat meat, and all their food is full of butter; they have also a very hot sauce. To add to this the servants tear the meat off in chunks for you to eat and hand it to you with their fingers. This is a special honour, and if you are not careful they put butter into your coffee, which is the nastiest drink one can possibly imagine. It is tiresome if one is a teetotaller, as they worry you to drink their liquor, tej by name, made out of honey.

The Sudan Interior Mission had a station at Wacca from 1952 until it was nationalized in 1988 and the buildings used as a school. Foreign travelers who came to the station in early 1965 found the original missionaries still in residence, and learned they were the first non-natives to visit the station in three years. A visitor in 1972 described Wacca as a town on top of a mountain, with a post office, a pharmacy, and an Ethiopian Orthodox church. Most buildings had iron sheet roofs and there were numerous eucalyptus trees. In 1995, the local school participated in an experimental curriculum to teach subjects in the Gamo-Gofa-Dawro language.

== Demographics ==
Based on figures from the Central Statistical Agency in 2005, Wacca has an estimated total population of 6,863 of whom 3,424 were men and 3,439 were women.

The 1994 census reported Wacca had a total population of 3,788 of whom 1,904 were men and 1,884 were women. The five largest ethnic groups reported for this town were the Kullo (79.7%), the Amhara (10.7%), the Oromo (2.19%), the Konta (1.32%), and the Gurage (1.32%); all other ethnic groups made up 4.77% of the population. Kullo is spoken as a first language by 89%, 6.47% Amharic, 0.98% spoke Konta, and 0.84% spoke Oromiffa; the remaining 2.81% spoke all other primary languages reported.
