= Vannutelli =

Vannutelli is an Italian surname. Notable people with the name include:

- Leonardo Vannutelli, Italian navy officer on Vittorio Bottego's second expedition to East Africa, after whom the Leptopelis vannutellii frog is named
- Luigi Vannutelli Rey (1880–1968), Italian diplomat
- Scipione Vannutelli (1831–1894), Italian painter
- Serafino Vannutelli (1834–1915), Italian Roman Catholic cardinal
- Vincenzo Vannutelli (1836–1930), Italian Roman Catholic cardinal
