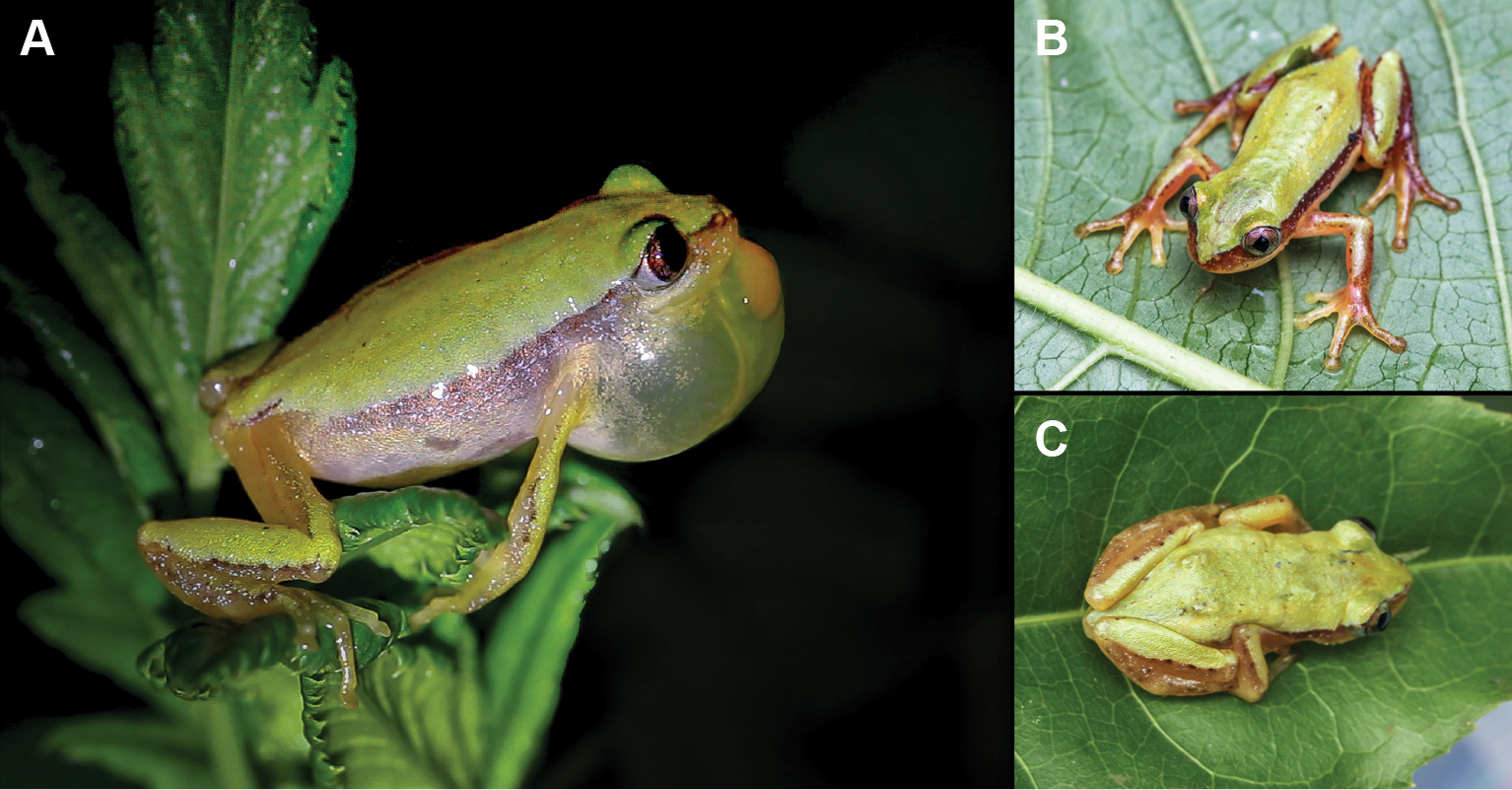

Conservation status
- Endangered (IUCN 3.1)

Scientific classification
- Kingdom: Animalia
- Phylum: Chordata
- Class: Amphibia
- Order: Anura
- Family: Hyperoliidae
- Genus: Afrixalus
- Species: A. clarkei

Binomial name
- Afrixalus clarkei Largen, 1974

Synonyms
- Afrixalus clarkeorum Largen, 1974 (unjustified emendation)

= Afrixalus clarkei =

Species of frog

Afrixalus clarkei is a species of frog in the family Hyperoliidae. It is endemic to southwestern Ethiopia and has been recorded from near Chira, Jimma, Bonga, and Bodare. The specific name clarkei honours Mr and Mrs R. O. S. Clarke (hence emendation to plural clarkeorum, but such change is nevertheless considered unjustified under the International Code of Zoological Nomenclature), who are acknowledged for their help and hospitality. Common name Clarke's banana frog has been coined for this species.

== Description ==
Adult males measure 20–23 mm (0.8–0.9 in) and adult females 23–24 mm (0.9–0.9 in) in snout–vent length. The head is broad with short snout. The tympanum ranges from completely hidden to somewhat noticeable. The fingers are unwebbed or have some webbing between the fingers III and IV. The toes are moderately webbed. Dorsal skin is smooth, but chest and abdomen may be rather coarsely granular. The dorsum is yellow-green to bright green, sometimes rarely olive to dark brown, with some scattered small white flecks and larger dark brown spots. There is a pair of dorsolateral lines or rows of dark brown spots, and broad brown lateral stripe running from the tip of the snout over the eye and reaching almost the groin. Males have yellow gular flap.

The male advertisement call consists of an initial creak, followed by a small number of metallic clicks.

== Habitat and conservation ==
Afrixalus clarkei is found in tropical deciduous forests and forest edges as well as in some moderately modified secondary habitats such as coffee plantations at elevations of 820–2,030 m (2,690–6,660 ft) above sea level. It has recently been recorded also in marshes and riverine floodplains in open disturbed landscapes. Afrixalus clarkei breeds in marshy pools with emergent vegetation. It is threatened by habitat loss caused by selective logging and encroachment of agriculture and human settlements. It is present in the Kafa Biosphere Reserve.
