= Keffa =

Keffa may refer to:

- Keffa Zone, Ethiopia
- Keffa Province, Ethiopia

== See also ==
- Keffiyeh
