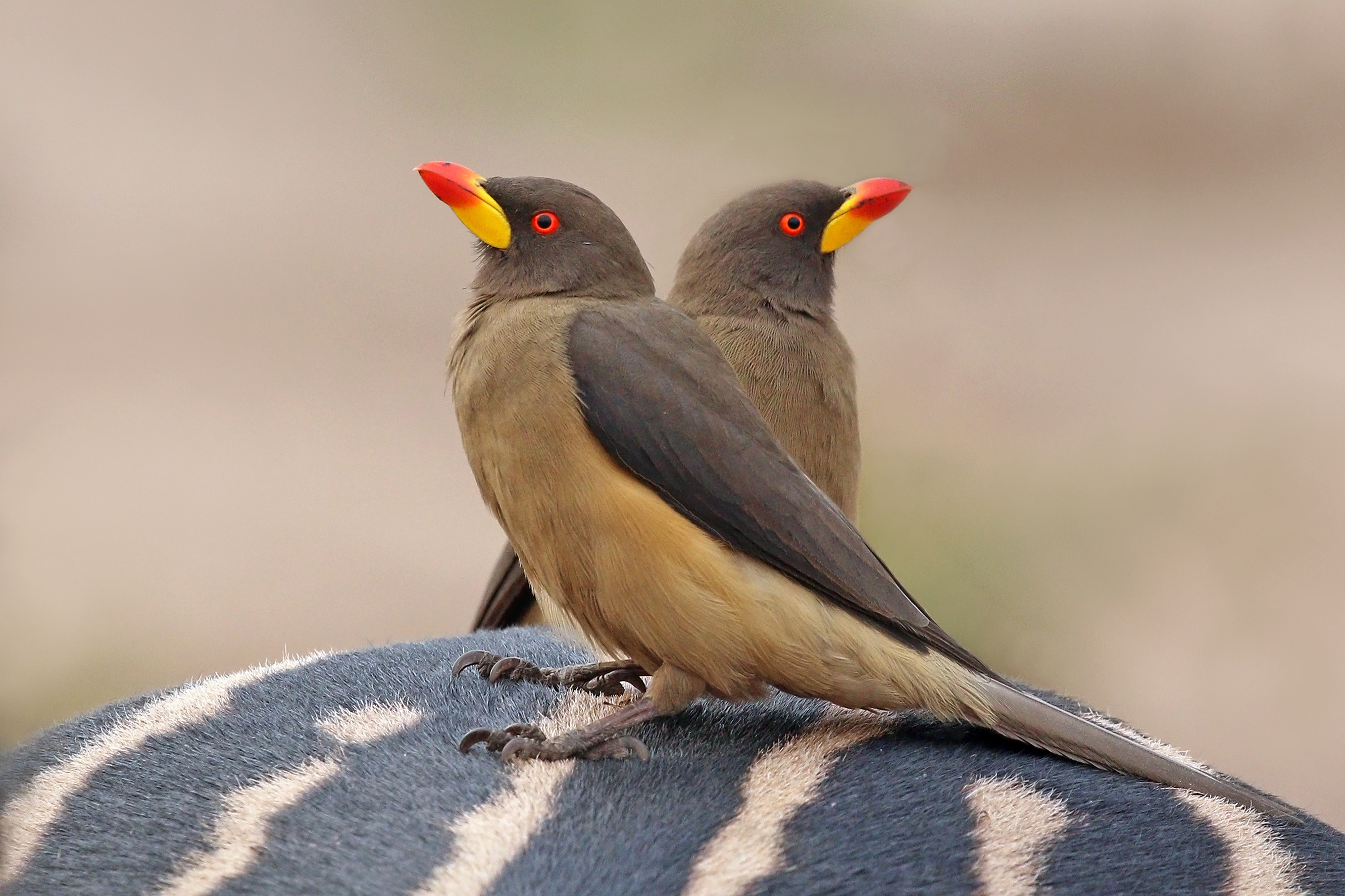
- Yellow-billed oxpeckers Buphagus africanus africanus on a zebra in Senegal

Scientific classification
- Kingdom: Animalia
- Phylum: Chordata
- Class: Aves
- Order: Passeriformes
- Superfamily: Muscicapoidea
- Family: Buphagidae; Lesson, 1828
- Genus: Buphagus; Brisson, 1760

Type species
- Buphaga africana Linnaeus, 1766

Species
- Buphagus africanus Buphagus erythrorhynchus

= Oxpecker =

Oxpeckers

Genus of birds

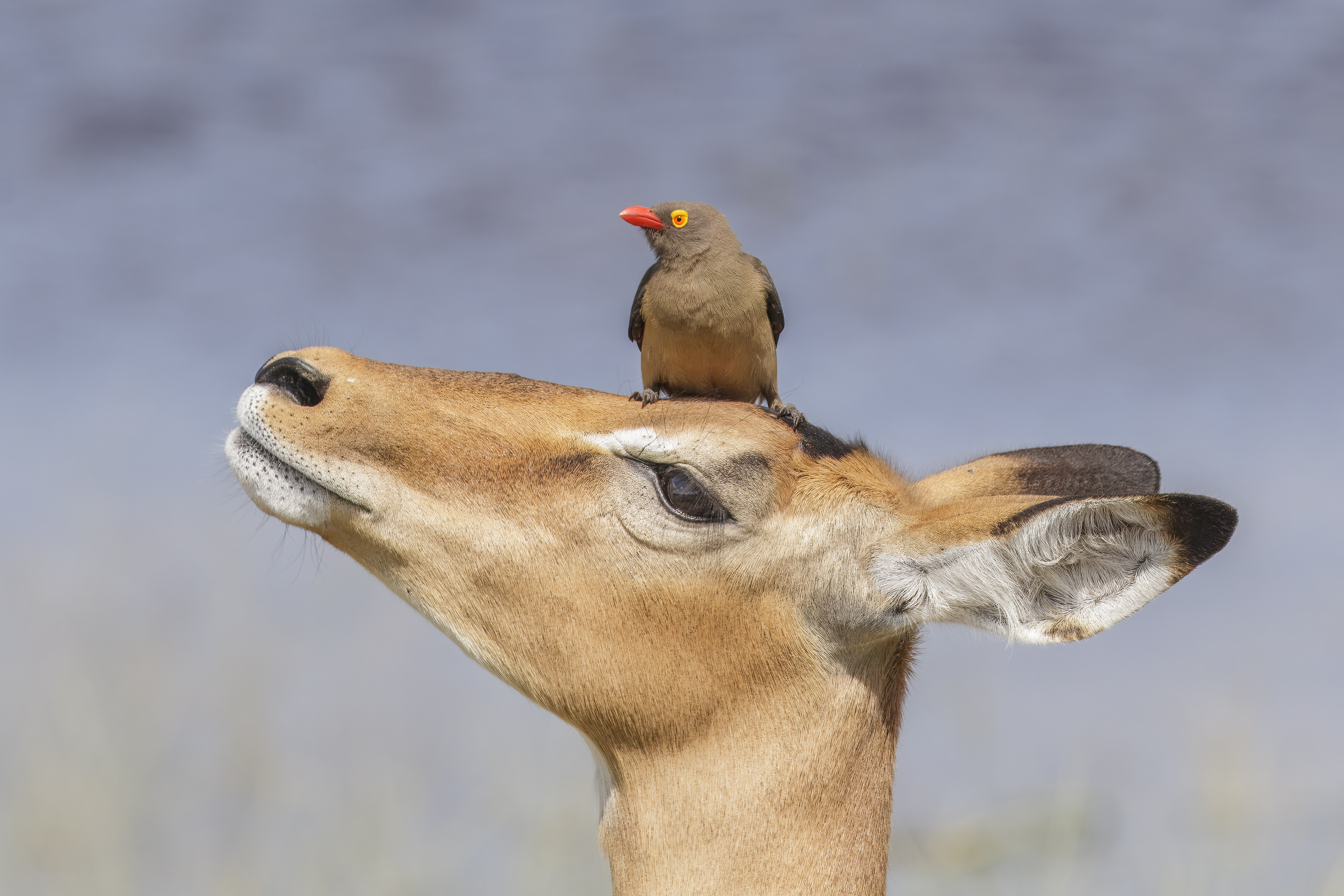
Buphagus erythrorhynchus on an impala

The oxpeckers are two species of bird which make up the genus Buphagus, from Ancient Greek βοῦς (boûs), meaning "ox", and φάγος (phágos), meaning "eater", and family Buphagidae. The oxpeckers were formerly usually treated as a subfamily, Buphaginae, within the starling family, Sturnidae, but molecular phylogenetic studies have consistently shown that they form a separate lineage that is basal to the sister clades containing the Sturnidae and the Mimidae (mockingbirds, thrashers, and allies). Oxpeckers are endemic to the savanna of Sub-Saharan Africa.

Both the English and scientific names arise from their habit of perching on large mammals (both wild and domesticated) such as cattle, zebras, impalas, hippopotamuses, rhinoceroses, and giraffes, eating ticks, small insects, botfly larvae, and other parasites, as well as the animals' blood. The behaviour of oxpeckers towards large mammals was thought to be exclusively mutual, though recent research suggests the relationship can be parasitic in nature as well.

The Swahili name for the red-billed oxpecker is Askari wa kifaru (the rhino's guard).

== Taxonomy ==
The genus Buphagus was introduced in 1760 by the French zoologist Mathurin Jacques Brisson with the yellow-billed oxpecker as the type species. The family name comes from Ancient Greek βοῦς (boûs), meaning "ox", and φάγος (phágos), meaning "eater".

According to the more recent studies of Muscicapoidea phylogeny, the oxpeckers are an ancient line related to Mimidae (mockingbirds and thrashers) and starlings but not particularly close to either. Considering the known biogeography of these groups, the most plausible explanation seems that the oxpecker lineage originated in Eastern or Southeastern Asia like the other two. This would make the two species of Buphagus something like living fossils, and demonstrates that such remnants of past evolution can possess striking and unique autapomorphic adaptations.

The genus contains two species:

Genus Buphagus – Brisson, 1760 – two species
Common name	Scientific name and subspecies	Range	Size and ecology	IUCN status and estimated population
Yellow-billed oxpecker	Buphagus africanus Linnaeus, 1766 Two subspecies: B. a. subsp. africanus Linnaeus, 1766; B. a. subsp. langi Chapin, 1921	most of sub-Saharan Africa	Size: Habitat: Diet:	LC
Red-billed oxpecker	Buphagus erythrorynchus (Stanley, 1814)	mainly east Africa	Size: Habitat: Diet:	LC

== Distribution and habitat ==
The oxpeckers are endemic to sub-Saharan Africa, where they occur in most open habitats. They are absent from the driest deserts and the rainforests. Their distribution is restricted by the presence of their preferred prey, specific species of ticks, and the animal hosts of those ticks. The two species of oxpecker are sympatric over much of East Africa and may even occur on the same host animal. The nature of the interactions between the two species is unknown.

== Behaviour ==
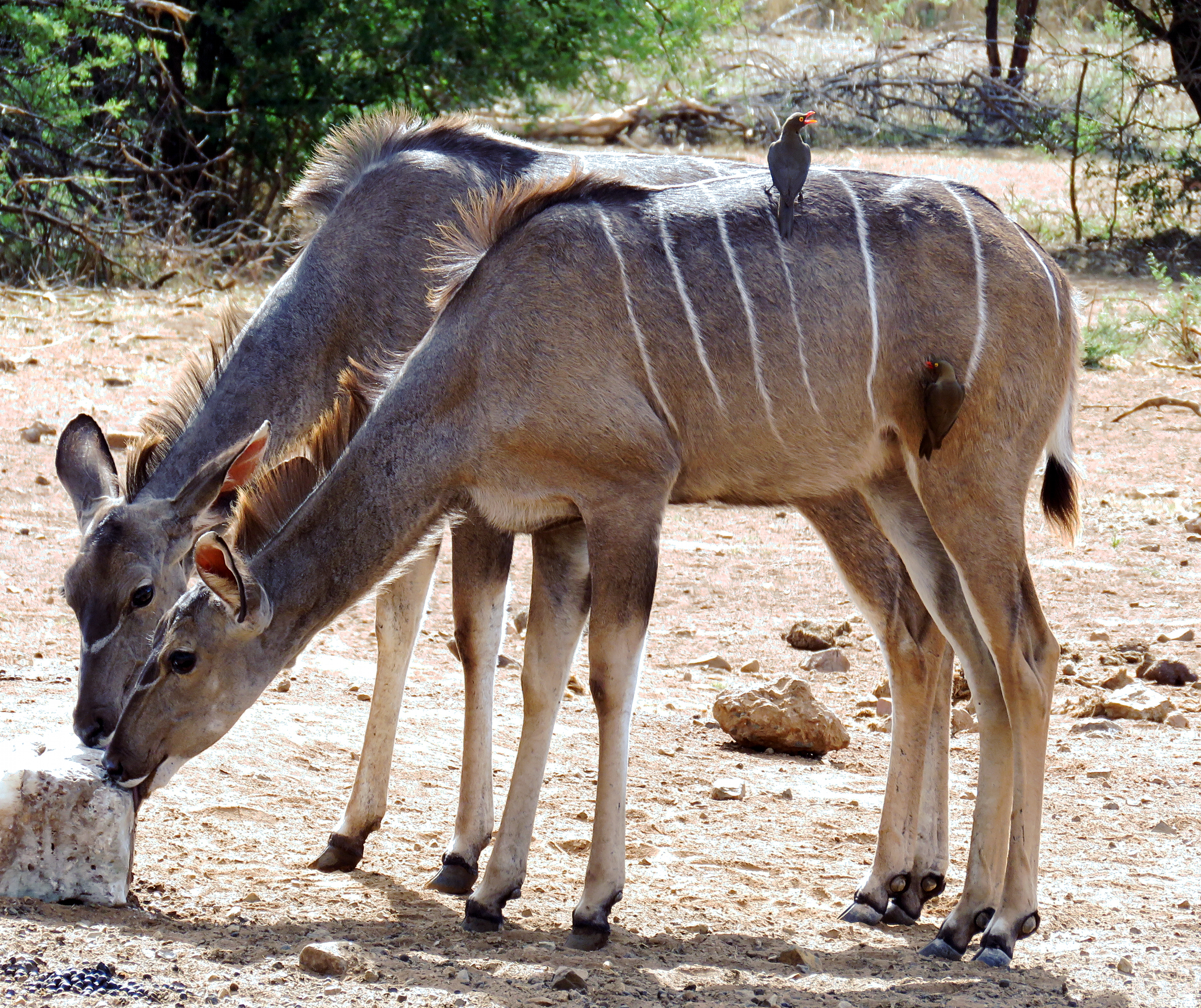
Red-billed oxpeckers on female greater kudu

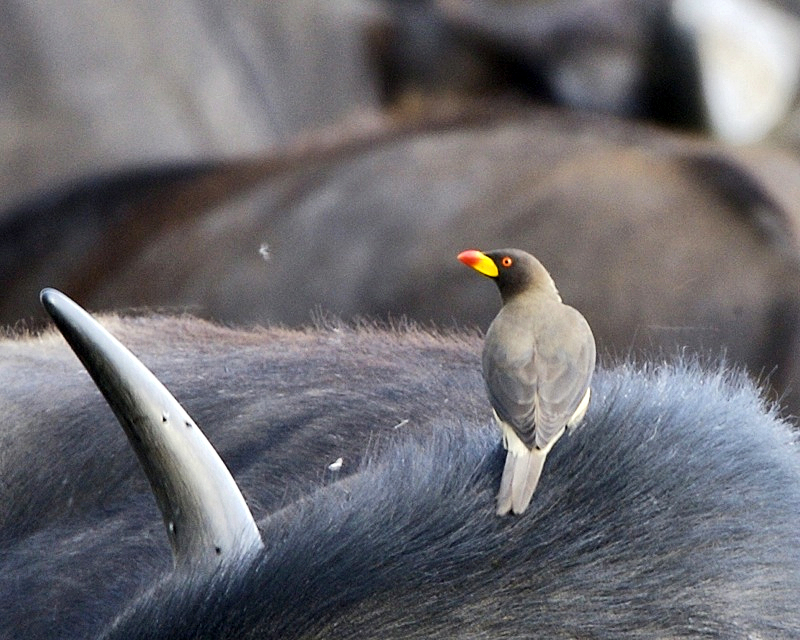
Yellow-billed oxpecker on a wildebeest

=== Diet and feeding ===
Oxpeckers graze exclusively on the bodies of large mammals. Certain species are seemingly preferred, whereas others, like the Lichtenstein's hartebeest or topi are generally avoided. Smaller antelope such as lechwe, duikers and reedbuck are also avoided; the smallest regularly used species is the impala, probably because of the heavy tick load and social nature of that species. In many parts of their range they now feed on cattle, but avoid camels. They feed on ectoparasites, particularly ticks, as well as insects infesting wounds and the flesh and blood of some wounds as well. They are sometimes classified as parasites, because they open wounds on the animals' backs.

Oxpecker/mammal interactions are the subject of some debate and ongoing research. They were originally thought to be an example of mutualism, but recent evidence suggests that oxpeckers may be parasites instead. Oxpeckers do eat ticks, but often the ticks have already fed on the ungulate host, and no statistically significant link has been shown between oxpecker presence and reduced ectoparasite load. Oxpeckers have been observed to open new wounds and enhance existing ones in order to drink the blood of their perches. Oxpeckers also feed on the earwax and dandruff of mammals; less is known about the possible benefits of this to the mammal, but it is suspected that this is also a parasitic behaviour. Some oxpeckers' hosts are intolerant of their presence. Elephants and some antelope will actively dislodge the oxpeckers when they land. However there have been noted instances of elephants allowing oxpeckers to eat parasites off of them. Other species tolerate oxpeckers while they search for ticks on their faces, which one author says "appears ... to be an uncomfortable and invasive process."

=== Breeding ===
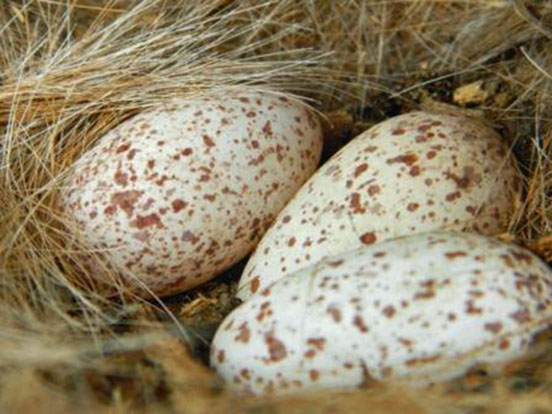
Clutch of red-billed oxpeckers in a nest lined with impala hair, Kenya

The breeding season of the oxpeckers, in at least one location, is linked to the rainy season, which affects the activity of their mammalian hosts and the tick loads of those hosts. Both courtship and copulation occur on their hosts as well. They nest in holes, usually in trees but sometimes in other types of cavity, including holes in walls. The nests are lined with grasses and often with hair plucked from their hosts and even livestock such as sheep which are not usually used. The typical clutch is between two and three eggs, but the red-billed oxpecker may lay up to five eggs.

== Roosting ==
Red-billed oxpeckers have been known to roost in reeds and trees. Studies of large savanna herbivores using cameras at night have shown that both species of oxpecker (but more often in yellow-billed oxpecker) may also roost on the bodies of herbivores, hanging under the insides of the thighs of giraffe and on top of impala and buffalo.
