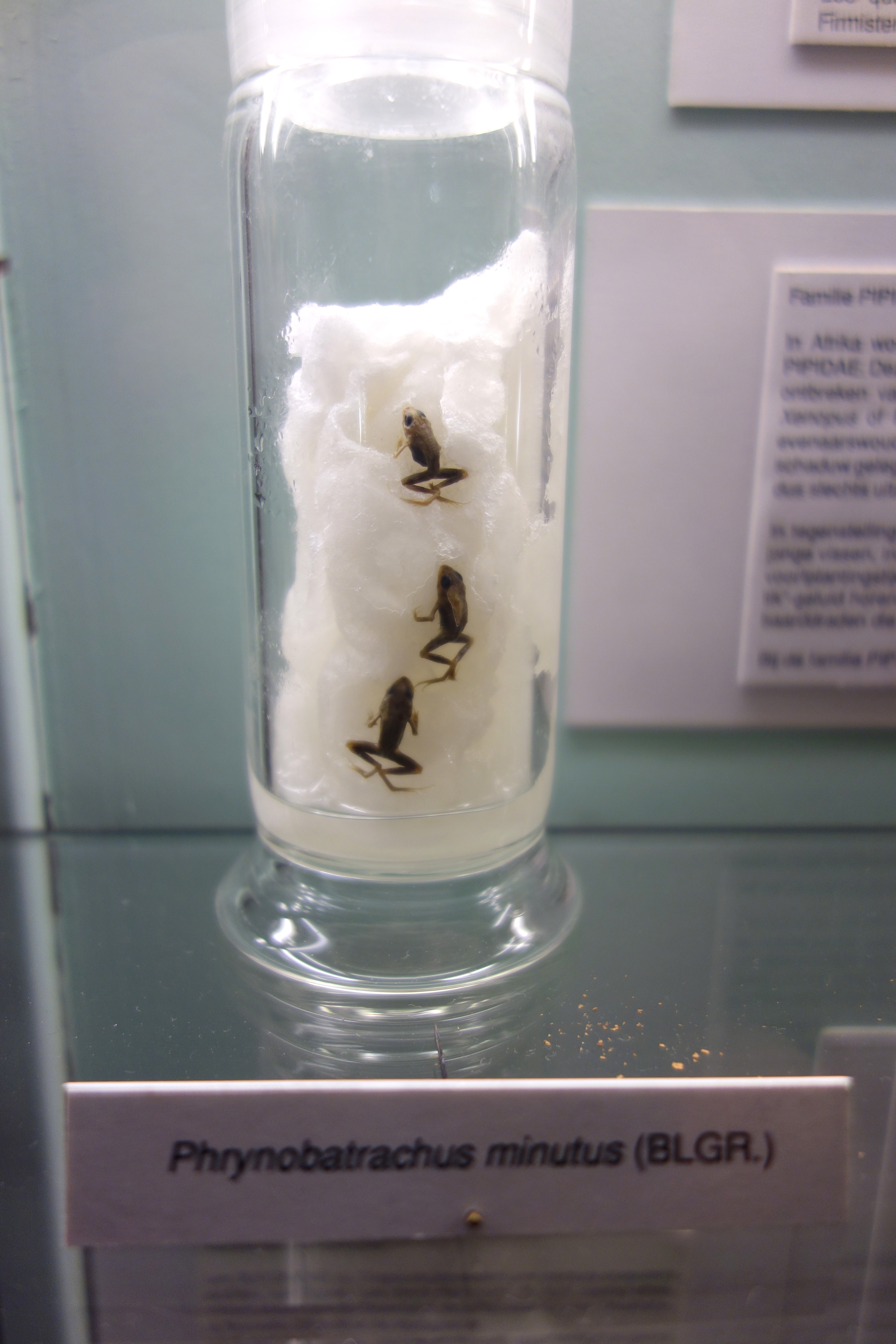

Conservation status
- Least Concern (IUCN 3.1)

Scientific classification
- Kingdom: Animalia
- Phylum: Chordata
- Class: Amphibia
- Order: Anura
- Family: Phrynobatrachidae
- Genus: Phrynobatrachus
- Species: P. minutus

Binomial name
- Phrynobatrachus minutus (Boulenger, 1895)

Synonyms
- Arthroleptis minutus Boulenger, 1895

= Phrynobatrachus minutus =

Species of frog

Phrynobatrachus minutus is a species of frog in the family Phrynobatrachidae. It is endemic to Ethiopia and occurs in the central and southern parts of the country on both sides of the Rift Valley; its range may extend south to Kenya, perhaps further. Some earlier records from Ethiopia represent Phrynobatrachus inexpectatus, described as a new species in 2001. The specific name minutus refers to the small size of this frog. Common names tiny river frog and Ethiopian dwarf puddle frog have been coined for it.

== Description ==
Adult males measure 15–20 mm (0.6–0.8 in) and adult females 18–23 mm (0.7–0.9 in) in snout–vent length. The tympanum is present but usually hidden, although it may sometimes just visible through the skin. The toes have feeble webbing and may have weakly developed discs. Dorsal skin is smooth or may have warts that can even be prominent, especially on the upper flanks, posterior back, and hind limbs. Alcohol-preserved specimens are dorsally pale to dark grey-brown or yellow-brown. In life, adult males have bright yellow throat.

== Habitat and conservation ==
Phrynobatrachus minutus occurs at the swampy margins of aquatic habitats (lakes, rivers, streams, and temporary pools) in moist grassland and forest clearings at elevations of 1,300–2,800 m (4,300–9,200 ft) above sea level, but perhaps as low as 800 m (2,600 ft). Breeding takes place in water. It is a quite common species where suitable habitat is present. Habitat degradation, caused in particular by agricultural expansion, human settlement, and overgrazing, is a threat to it. It is present in the Bale Mountains National Park, and probably in other protected areas as well.
