= Bita (district) =

District in Ethiopia

Bita is a district in the South West Ethiopia Peoples' Region of Ethiopia. Part of the Keffa Zone, Bita is bordered on the west by the Sheka Zone, on the north by Gesha, on the northeast by Gewata, and on the west by Chena. The major town in Bita is Bita Genet. Bita was formed from parts of Chena and Gesha districts.

== Demographics ==
Based on the 2007 Census conducted by the CSA, this district has a total population of 74,577, of whom 36,918 are men and 37,659 women; 2,746 or 3.68% of its population are urban dwellers. The most common religions were Protestants, with 44.24% of the population reporting that belief, and Ethiopian Orthodox Christianity, practiced by 44.12% of the inhabitants. 6.77% were Muslim, and 3.92% practiced traditional beliefs.
