= Gena Bosa =

Gena is one of the woredas in the South West Ethiopia Peoples' Region of Ethiopia. Part of the Dawro Zone, Gena Bosa is bordered on the south by Loma, on the west by Mareka, on the north by the Gojeb River which separates it from the Oromia Region, on the northeast by the Hadiya Zone and Kembata Tembaro Zone, and on the east by the Wolayita Zone. The eastern and northeastern border of Gena Bosa is marked by the Omo River. Towns in Gena Bosa include Weldehane. Gena Bosa was formed of parts of former Loma Bosa and Mareka Gena woredas.

== Demographics ==
Based on the 2007 Census conducted by the CSA, this woreda has a total population of 86,565, of whom 43,414 are men and 43,151 women; 1,413 or 1.63% of its population are urban dwellers. The majority of the inhabitants were Protestants, with 76.18% of the population reporting that belief, 14.46% practiced Ethiopian Orthodox Christianity, 5.36% embraced Catholicism, and 2.35% practiced traditional beliefs.
