= Tarcha =

Town in Ethiopia

- Town
- Location within Ethiopia
- Coordinates: 7°09′N 37°10′E
- Country: Ethiopia
- Region: South West Ethiopia Peoples' Region
- Zone: Dawro Zone

Government
  - Mayor: ASNAKE ABEBE

Population (2025)
  - Total: 75,000
- Time zone: UTC+3 (East Africa Time)

Tarcha is town and separate district in southwestern Ethiopia. Tarcha serves as the seat of Dawro Zone of Southwestern Ethiopia Regional State. Tarcha located in 507 km southwest from Addis Ababa, and also 169 km away from nearby city Wolaita Sodo.

== Infrastructures ==
Tarcha has 24 hours electricity, one government hospital, one polytechnic college and there is also higher education called Dawro Tarcha campus; one of the branches of Wolaita Sodo University.
