= Isara (woreda) =

Isara is one of the woredas in the South West Ethiopia Peoples' Region of Ethiopia. Part of the Dawro Zone, Isara is bordered on the south by the Omo River which separates this woreda from the Gamo Gofa Zone, on the west by the Konta zone, on the north by the Tocha, on the northeast by Mareka, and on the east by Loma Bosa. Towns in Isara include Bale. Isara was part of former Isara Tocha woreda.

Economy

The economy of Isara is mainly based on Agriculture and animal raising. Isara has fertile land, suitable for growing crops like maize, coffee, Teff, Wheat and others. Especially the coffee of Isara was approved as high quality level at national standard. This woreda also produces Enset and bamboo trees at large scale. Isara woreda has lot of tourist attractions sites, for example, Chebera churchura National Park, Chofore Lake. This woreda is part of Koysha Gebetta Lehager project which can make it to be important tourist destination in the near future.

== Demographics ==
Based on the 2007 Census conducted by the CSA, this woreda has a total population of 64,950, of whom 32,833 are men and 32,117 women; 4,030 or 6.21% of its population are urban dwellers. The majority of the inhabitants practiced Ethiopian Orthodox Christianity, with 47.27% of the population reporting that belief, 34.65% were Protestants, 13.97% practiced traditional beliefs, and 2.25% embraced Catholicism.
