= Gesha =

District of Ethiopia

Coordinates: 7°40′N 35°50′E

Gesha (Amharic: ጋሻ, romanized: gaša) is a district in the South West Region of Ethiopia. Part of the Keffa Zone, Gesha is bordered on the south by Bita, on the west by the Sheka Zone, on the north by the Oromia Region and Sayilem, and on the east by Gewata. Towns in Gesha include Deka. The northern part of Gesha was separated to create Sayilem district, the eastern part was added to Gewata district and the southern part to Bita district.

Major rivers in Gesha include the Gonogory, Datay, Yobateshe, Shewleche, Ginnay, Ocashy.

Gesha is home to the Gemadro Coffee Plantation, a property of the Ethio-Coffee and Tea Plantation and Marketing PLC, which is a division of MIDROC. According to the Gemadro website, 1,010 hectares (2,500 acres) of the plantation's 2,295 hectares (5,670 acres) is planted in coffee. The plantation and the neighboring village are named after the Gemadro River. The region is also the origin of the highly-sought Geisha coffee varietal, though most production now takes place in Panama.

== Demographics ==
Based on the 2007 Census conducted by the CSA, this district has a total population of 85,104, of whom 41,441 are men and 43,663 women; 3,433 or 4.03% of its population are urban dwellers. The majority of the inhabitants were Protestants, with 44.62% of the population reporting that belief, 41.02% practiced Ethiopian Orthodox Christianity, and 13.25% were Muslim.

In the 1994 national census, Gesha had a population of 117,121, of whom 56,929 were men and 60,192 women; 2,579 or 2.2% of its population were urban dwellers. The three largest ethnic groups reported in this district were the Kafficho (88.67%), the Oromo (10.08%), and the Amhara (0.75%); all other ethnic groups made up 0.5% of the population. Kafa was spoken as a first language by 88.72% of the inhabitants, 10.23% spoke Oromiffa, and 0.61% spoke Amharic; the remaining 0.44% spoke all other primary languages reported.

Concerning education, 15.73% of the population were considered literate; 10.98% of children aged 7–12 were in primary school; 2.44% of the children aged 13–14 were in junior secondary school; and 0.57% of the inhabitants aged 15–18 were in senior secondary school. Concerning sanitary conditions, about 7.72% of the urban houses and 9.6% of all houses had access to safe drinking water at the time of the census, while about 5.25% of the urban and 49.34% of the total had toilet facilities.
