= Cheta (district) =

District in the South West Region of Ethiopia

Cheta is a district in the South West Region of Ethiopia. This district has its origins in the province Chetta of the former Kingdom of Kaffa. Part of the Keffa Zone, Cheta is bordered on the west by Decha, on the north by Telo, and on the east by the Konta special district. Towns in Cheta include Shama. Cheta was separated from the Telo district.

== Demographics ==
Based on the 2007 Census conducted by the CSA, this district has a total population of 32,619, of whom 15,870 are men and 16,749 women; 1,467 or 4.5% of its population are urban dwellers. The majority of the inhabitants practiced Ethiopian Orthodox Christianity, with 77.37% of the population reporting that belief, 16.31% practiced traditional beliefs, 4.1% were Protestants, and were Muslim.
