= Bye bye beauté =

Studio album by Coralie Clément
- Released: February 15, 2005
- Length: 37:10
- Label: Diese
- Producer: Benjamin Biolay

Bye bye beauté is an album by Coralie Clément, released on February 15, 2005, through Diese.

== Background ==
Benjamin Biolay, the brother of Clément, contributed to the songwriting of ten songs on the album and produced eleven.

== Reception ==
PopMatters rated the album five out of ten, noting "Bye Bye Beauté‘s defining sound is Clément’s voice, a supernally girlish whisper floating so absurdly high up in the mix you can hear her gums smacking together."

== Track listing ==
No.	Title	Length
1.	"Indécise"	2:42
2.	"Gloria"	2:37
3.	"L'enfer"	3:15
4.	"Avec Ou Sans Moi"	2:09
5.	"Un Beau Jour Pour Mourir"	3:57
6.	"Beau Fixe"	2:41
7.	"Kids (Jeu Du Foulard)"	3:05
8.	"L'impasse"	3:24
9.	"Mais Pourtant" (duo avec Daniel Lorca)	2:51
10.	"Ta Révérence"	2:49
11.	"Bye Bye Beauté"	3:51
12.	"Épilogue"	3:49
Total length:		39:50
