= Sayilem =

Sayilem ስያይ ለም
- Location within Ethiopia
- Coordinates: 7°54′50″N 35°51′12″E
- Country: Ethiopia
- Region: SWEPR
- Zone: Keffa

Population (2007)
  - Total: 40,874
- Time zone: UTC+3 (EAT)

Sayilem is a district in the South West Region of Ethiopia. Part of the Keffa Zone, Sayilem is bordered on the south by Gesha, on the west, north and east by the Oromia Region, and on the southeast by Gewata. Towns in Sayilem include Yadota. Originally part of the Gesha region, Sayilem was later separated from it.

== Demographics ==
Based on the 2007 Census conducted by the CSA, this district has a total population of 40,874, of whom 19,895 are men and 20,979 women; 2,025 or 4.95% of its population are urban dwellers. The majority of the inhabitants were Protestants, with 57.26% of the population reporting that belief, 21.71% practiced Ethiopian Orthodox Christianity, and 20.79% were Muslim.
