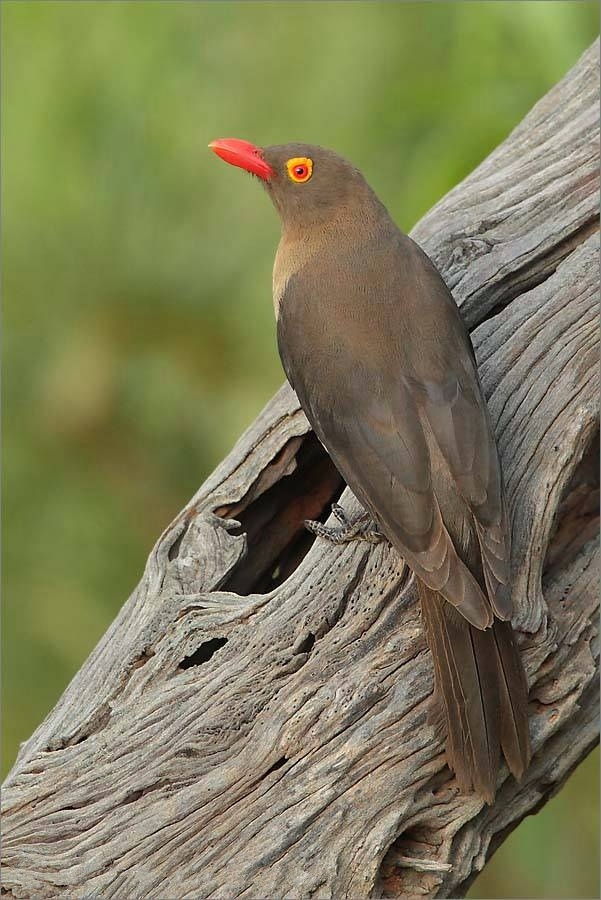
- Adult at nest entrance

Conservation status
- Least Concern (IUCN 3.1)

Scientific classification
- Kingdom: Animalia
- Phylum: Chordata
- Class: Aves
- Order: Passeriformes
- Family: Buphagidae
- Genus: Buphagus
- Species: B. erythroryncha

Binomial name
- Buphagus erythroryncha (Stanley, 1814)
- Range

Synonyms
- Buphagus erythrorhynchus

= Red-billed oxpecker =

Species of bird

The red-billed oxpecker (Buphagus erythroryncha) is a passerine bird in the oxpecker family, Buphagidae. It is native to the eastern savannah of sub-Saharan Africa, from the Central African Republic east to South Sudan and south to northern and eastern South Africa. It is more widespread than the yellow-billed oxpecker in Southern Africa, where their ranges overlap.

== Taxonomy ==
The scientific name comes from Ancient Greek βοῦς (boûs), meaning "ox", and φάγος (phágos), meaning "eater". The specific name comes from ἐρυθρός (eruthrós), meaning "red", and ῥύγχος (rhúnkhos), meaning "snout".

== Distribution ==
The red-billed oxpecker is a native of the savanna of sub-Saharan Africa. It ranges across Ethiopia and Somalia through Kenya, Tanzania, Malawi, and Zambia to southern Africa, Botswana, Zimbabwe, southern Mozambique, and north-eastern South Africa.

== Description ==
A juvenile oxpecker is darker brown than its parents. Its bill is dark olive at first, but gradually takes on adult colouration after four months. Its flight is strong and direct, and their call is a hissy crackling trik-quisss.

== Behaviour ==
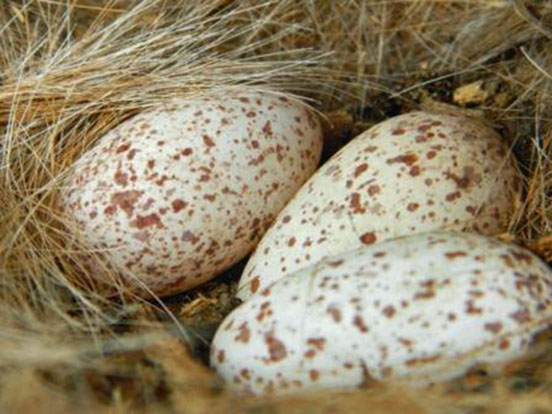
Clutch in a nest lined with impala hair, Kenya

The red-billed oxpecker nests in tree holes lined with hair plucked from livestock. It lays two to five eggs, with three being the average. Outside the breeding season it forms large, chattering flocks.

The preferred habitat is open country, and the red-billed oxpecker eats insects. Both the English and scientific names arise from this species' habit of perching on large wild and domesticated mammals such as cattle and eating ticks. This species's relationship with rhinoceros gives the Swahili name Askari wa kifaru meaning "the rhino's guard".

An adult will take nearly 100 blood-engorged female Rhipicephalus (Boophilus) decoloratus ticks, or more than 12,000 larvae in a day. However, their preferred food is blood, and while they may take ticks bloated with blood, they also feed on it directly, pecking at the mammal's wounds to keep them open.

Field observations in rhinoceros have shown oxpeckers warning the nearsighted rhinoceros of danger.

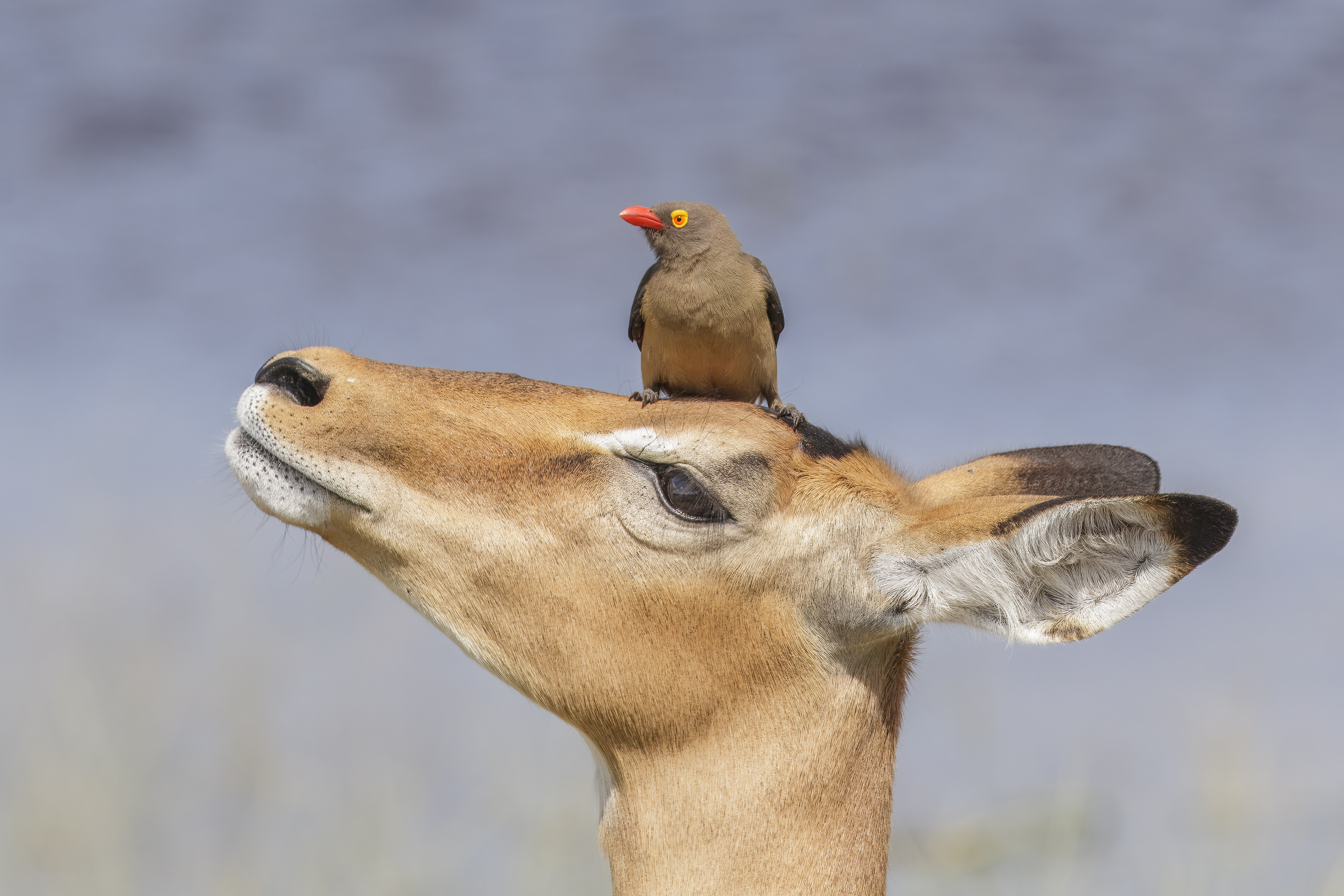
Perched on an impala ewe

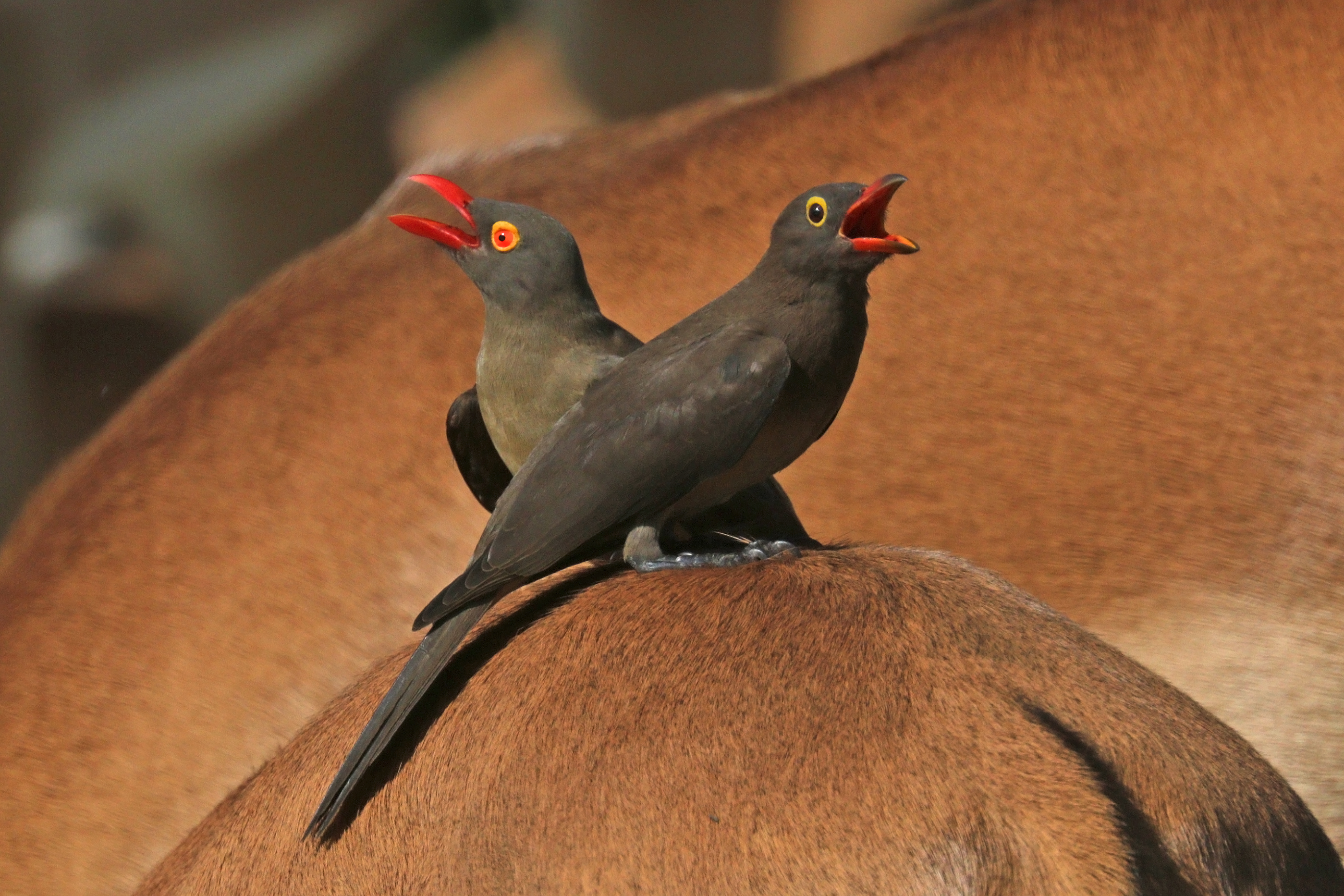
Adult (L) and sub-adult (R) on impala

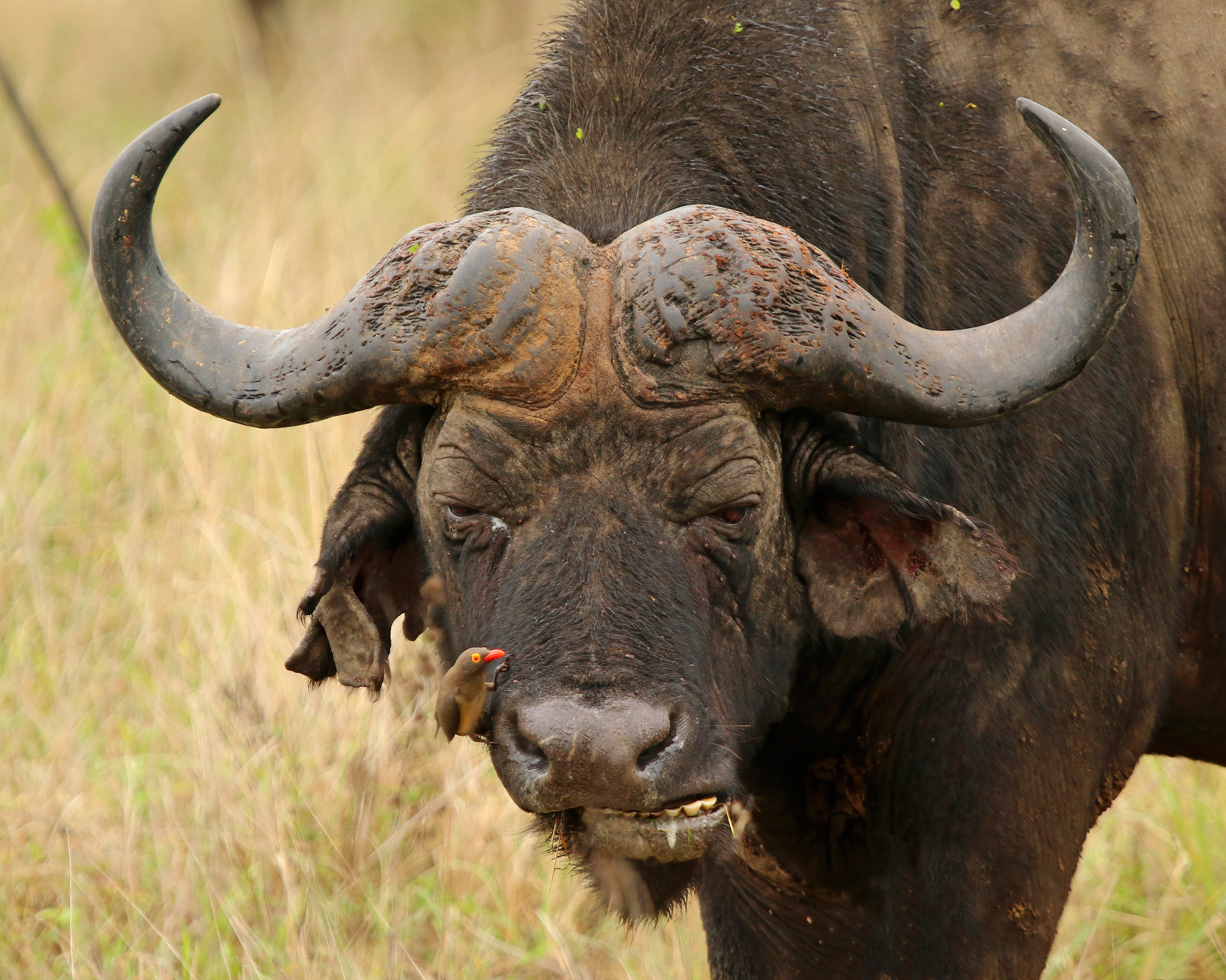
Perched on an African buffalo

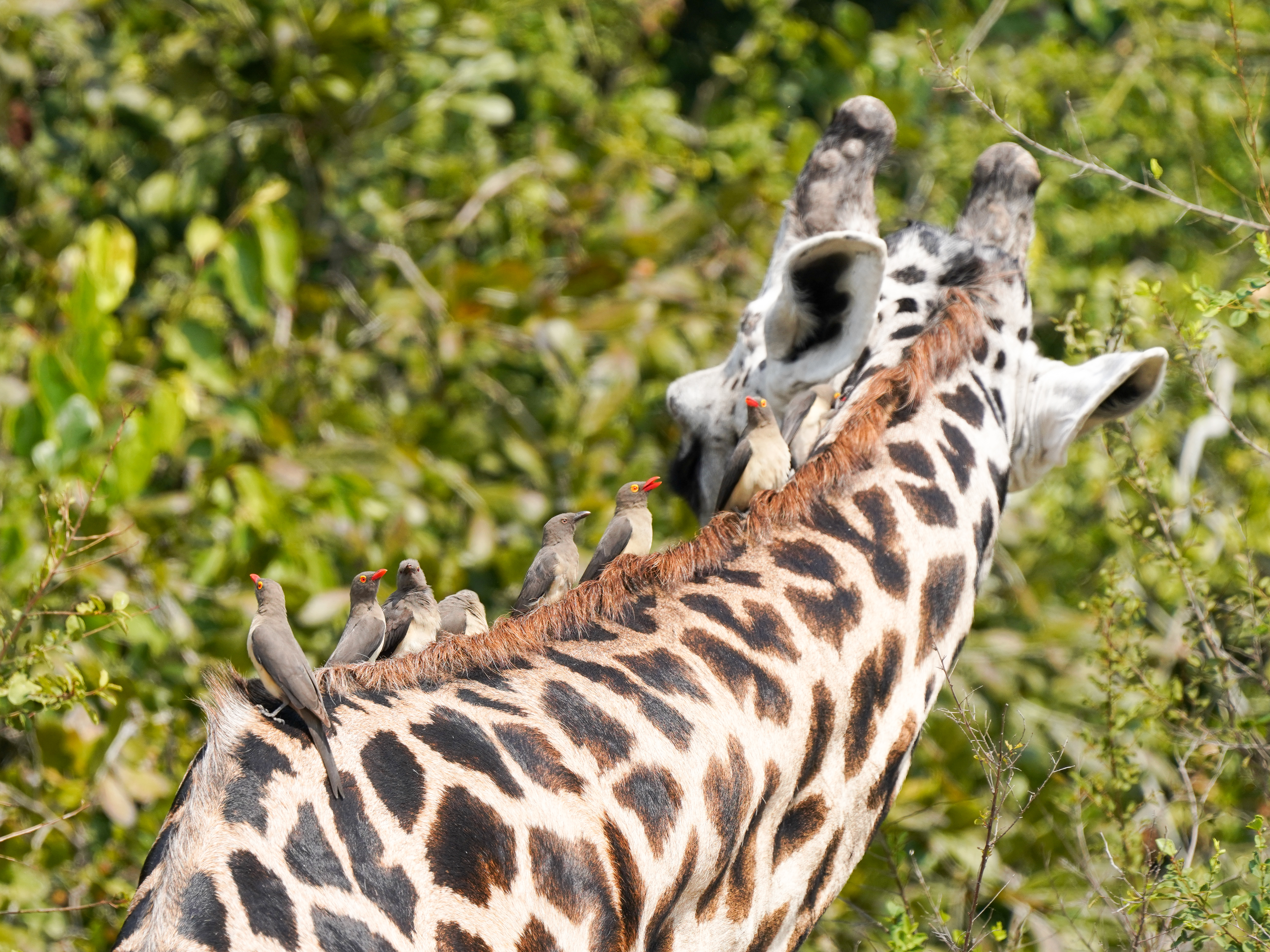
Row of red-billed oxpeckers on a Thornicroft's giraffe, Zambia

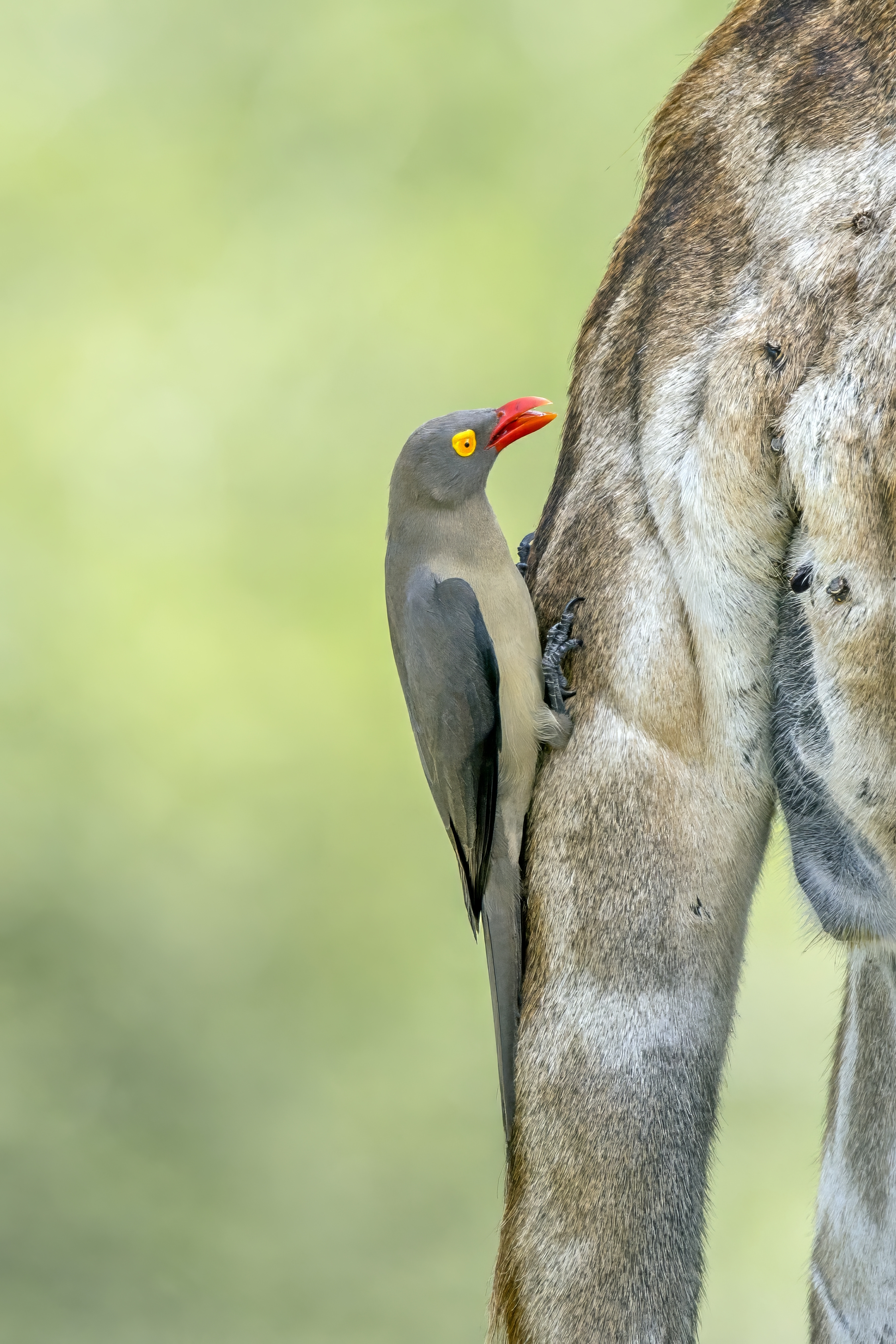
On tail of a giraffe
