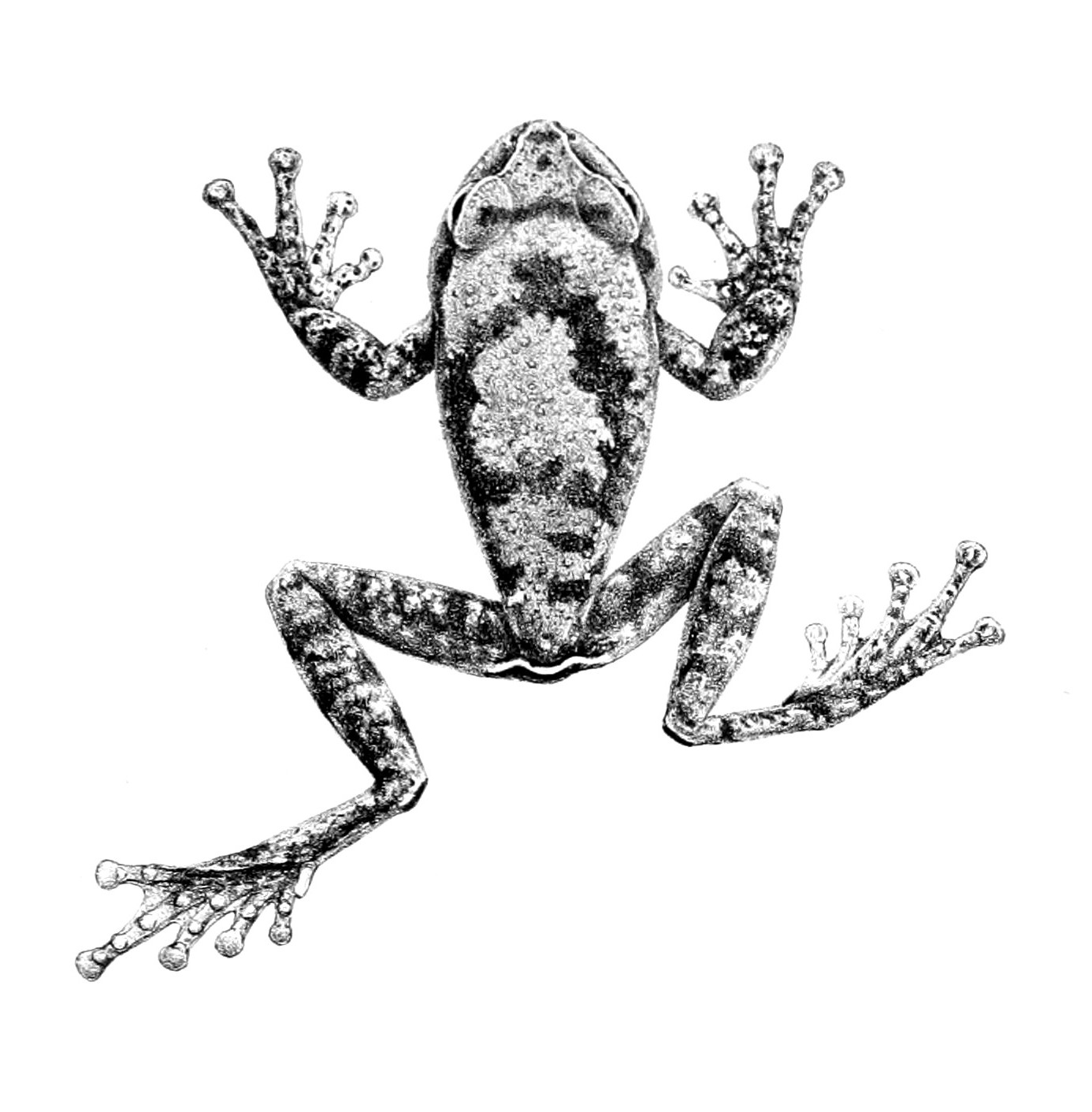

Conservation status
- Least Concern (IUCN 3.1)

Scientific classification
- Kingdom: Animalia
- Phylum: Chordata
- Class: Amphibia
- Order: Anura
- Family: Arthroleptidae
- Genus: Leptopelis
- Species: L. vannutellii

Binomial name
- Leptopelis vannutellii (Boulenger, 1898)

Synonyms
- Hylambates vannutellii Boulenger, 1898

= Leptopelis vannutellii =

Species of amphibian

Leptopelis vannutellii is a species of frog in the family Arthroleptidae. It is endemic to the highlands of southwestern Ethiopia. Common names Vannutelli's tree frog and Dime forest treefrog have been coined for it. It is named after Leonardo Vannutelli, Italian navy officer who joined Vittorio Bottego's second expedition to East Africa.

== Description ==
Adult males measure 27–39 mm (1.1–1.5 in) and adult females 40–46 mm (1.6–1.8 in) in snout–vent length. The dorsum is grey to brown and has darker markings that sometimes are just discernible. The pattern involves a broad interorbital bar, a series of dark blotches in the shoulder region that usually form a forward-pointing triangle, and irregular blotches in the sacral region. Often both back and limbs have irregularly scattered white spots. Toes, underside of limbs, tongue, and lips are translucent blue-green.

Leptopelis vannutellii is similar to Leptopelis ragazzii but can be distinguished from that species by its blue-green ventral colours and the different habitat.

== Habitat and conservation ==
Leptopelis vannutellii lives in dense, tropical deciduous forests at elevations of 1,500–2,200 m (4,900–7,200 ft) above sea level. It is an arboreal species. The eggs are laid in nests on land, near water, and the tadpoles develop in pools and small streams, both permanent and temporary. It tolerates some habitat disturbance and is locally common at suitable sites. Habitat loss caused by forest clearance, human settlement, and agricultural encroachment is a threat to it. It occurs in the Kafa Biosphere Reserve. Chytrid fungus has been detected in this species, although its impact remains unknown.
