= Phrynobatrachus inexpectatus =

Conservation status
- Data Deficient (IUCN 3.1)

Scientific classification
- Kingdom: Animalia
- Phylum: Chordata
- Class: Amphibia
- Order: Anura
- Family: Phrynobatrachidae
- Genus: Phrynobatrachus
- Species: P. inexpectatus

Binomial name
- Phrynobatrachus inexpectatus Largen, 2001

Species of frog

Phrynobatrachus inexpectatus is a species of frog in the family Phrynobatrachidae. It is endemic to southern Ethiopia. It is known with confidence from only three localities, but it may be more widely distributed in the Ethiopian Highlands. The specific name inexpectatus refers to the unexpected discovery of this species among museum specimens assigned to Phrynobatrachus minutus. Common names unexpected puddle frog and Largen's dwarf puddle frog have been coined for it.

== Description ==
Adult males measure 13–16 mm (0.5–0.6 in) and adult females 15–17 mm (0.6–0.7 in) in snout–vent length. The tympanum is present but almost or completely hidden under the skin. The toes have feeble webbing and lack terminal discs. Dorsal skin is sometimes smooth but usually has warts in varying degree of number and prominence, most evidently on the upper flanks, posterior back, and hind limbs. Alcohol-preserved specimens are dorsally grey-brown; a paler vertebral line, stripe, or broad mid-dorsal band may be present. Dorsal pattern usually consists of very obscure blotching, spotting, and freckling. Adult males have strongly darkened throat, whereas throat of females is more or less profusely sprinkled with melanophores, either uniformly or clustered to form mottling or vermiculation.

== Habitat and conservation ==
Phrynobatrachus inexpectatus at elevations of 1,900–2,650 m (6,230–8,690 ft) above sea level. It has been found amongst herbaceous vegetation at the margins of pools in open areas inside forests, and in a heavily grazed marshy area of extensively cultivated habitat where only remnants of former forest cover remained; whether this indicates tolerance to habitat disturbance or residual persistence is unknown. Breeding takes place in pools and marshes. Habitat degradation is a likely threat to this species. It is present in the Bale Mountains National Park.
