= Gese =

Gese may refer to:

== People ==
- Bartholomäus Gesius (also: Göß, Gese) (c. 1562 – 1613), a German theologian
- Gese Wechel (died 1645), managing director of the Swedish Post Office

== Other uses ==
- Georgian Stock Exchange, or GeSE
- Germanium monoselenide, a chemical compound with the formula GeSe
- Graded Examinations in Spoken English (GESE), of the Trinity College London ESOL examinations board

== See also ==
- Goose, plural geese
