= Konta Zone =

Zone in South West Region, Ethiopia

Coordinates: 6°55′N 36°35′E

Map of the regions and zones of Ethiopia

Konta, previously called Ela, is a zone in the Southwest Region of Ethiopia. It is named after Konta people who speak the dialects called Kontatsuwa which is one of Omotic languages. Before joining to Southwest Ethiopia Regional State, Konta was special woreda. This zone is bordered on the southeast by the Omo River which separates it from Gofa Zone, on the south by Debub Omo Zone, on the west by the Keffa Zone, on the north by Jimma Zone, and on the east by the Dawro Zone; the Denchya River defines the southern part of the boundary with the Keficho Shekicho Zone. The administrative center of the zone is Amaya. Other town include Chida.

== Overview ==
According to a 2004 report, Konta had 51 kilometers of all-weather roads and 98 kilometers of dry-weather roads, for an average road density of 66 kilometers per 1000 square kilometers. This zone is part of a region characterized by hills, and is not suitable for grazing or cultivation, but farmers cultivate the sloping land, leading to erosion and reduced soil fertility. Important food crops include enset, sweet potatoes, taro and beans, while important cash crops are maize, teff and pulses.

Originally Konta was part of the Semien (North) Omo Zone, and the 1994 national census counted its inhabitants as part of that Zone. However friction between the various ethnic groups in this Zone and despite the efforts of the ruling party to emphasize the need to co-ordinate, consolidate, and unify the smaller ethnic units to achieve the "efficient use of scarce government resources", eventually led to the division of the Zone in 2000, and reorganizing Konta as a special woreda.

== Demographics ==
Based on the 2007 Census conducted by the Central Statistical Agency of Ethiopia (CSA), this zone has a total population of 90,846, of whom 44,686 are men and 46,160 women. With an area of 2,381.63 square kilometers, Konta has a population density of 38.14; 8,257 or 9.09% are urban inhabitants. A total of 21,854 households were counted in this woreda, which results in an average of 4.16 persons to a household, and 21,114 housing units. The five largest ethnic groups reported in Konta were the Konta (85.52%), the Chara (4.07%), the Wolayta (3.75%), the Kaffa (2.19%), and the Amhara (1.13%); all other ethnic groups made up 3.34% of the population. Konta is spoken as a first language by 83.39%, 4.21% Kafa, 4.07% Chara, 3.73% Wolaytta, and 1.12% speak Amharic; the remaining 3.48% spoke all other primary languages reported. 49.11% were Protestants, 43.7% of the population said they were Ethiopian Orthodox Christianity, and 4.72% practiced traditional beliefs.

The 1994 national census reported a total population for this zone of 52,321 of whom 25,284 were males and 27,037 were females; 2,787 or 5.33% of its population were urban dwellers. The three largest ethnic groups reported in Konta were the Konta (86.19%), the Kaffa (5.37%), and the Chara (3.25%); all other ethnic groups made up 5.19% of the population. Konta is spoken as a first language by 85.14%, 6.71% Kafa, and 3.28% speak Chara; the remaining 4.87% spoke all other primary languages reported. However, Ralph Siebert's local research in 1995 led him to believe that this zone was predominantly inhabited by the Dawro people. Concerning religious beliefs, the 1994 census reported that 44.55% of the population said they observed traditional religions, 43.19% practiced Ethiopian Orthodox Christianity, and 7.53% were Protestants.
