= Loma Bosa =

Coordinates: 6°55′N 37°20′E

Loma Bosa (also known as simply Loma) was one of the 77 woredas in the SWE Region of Ethiopia. Part of the Dawro Zone, Loma Bosa was bordered on the south by the Dissa Wereda, on the west by Mareka, on the northwest by Mareka Gena, on the north by the Zaba Gazo, and on the east by the Wolayita Zone; the Omo River defined Loma Bose's boundary on the northeast, east and south. The major town in Loma Bosa was Gessa town.

== Demographics ==
Based on figures published by the Central Statistical Agency in 2005, this woreda has an estimated total population of 131,160, of whom 67,184 were men and 63,976 were women; 1,364 or 1.04% of its population are urban dwellers, which is less than the Zone average of 8.5%. With an estimated area of 1,980.63 square kilometers, Loma Bosa has an estimated population density of 66.2 people per square kilometer, which is less than the Zone average of 156.5.

The 1994 national census reported a total population for this woreda of 92,893 of whom 45,334 were males and 47,559 were females; 753 or 0.81% of its population were urban dwellers. The two largest ethnic groups reported in Loma Bosa were the Kullo (97.29%), and the Amhara (1.15%); all other ethnic groups made up 1.56% of the population. Kullo was the dominant first language spoken by 99.66% of the inhabitants; the remaining 0.34% spoke all other primary languages reported. Concerning religious beliefs, the 1994 census reported that 43.03% of the population said they observed traditional religions, 29.39% practiced Ethiopian Orthodox Christianity, and 25.8% were Protestants.
