= Gesa Weyhenmeyer =

Swedish limnologist (born 1969)

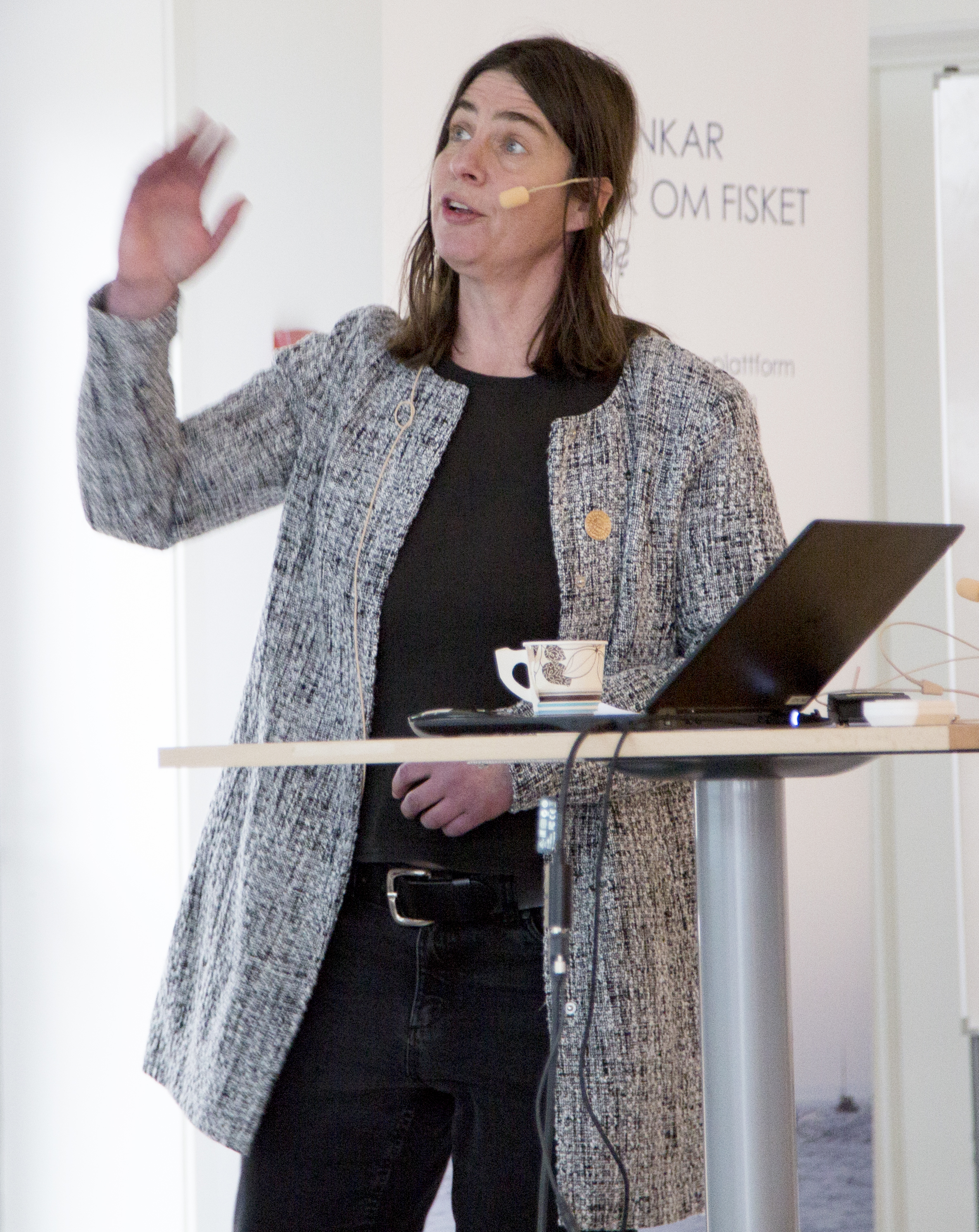
- Scientific presentation by Weyhenmeyer in 2017
- Born: 1969 (age 56–57)
- Education: Christan-Albrechts-Universität zu Kiel (Undergraduate studies, 1989-90); Albert-Ludwigs-Universität Freiburg (Vordiplom in Hydrology, 1991); Trent University (BSc - Dean's Honors List, 1992); Uppsala University (PhD, 1996); The University of Western Australia (Postdoc); Technische Universität Dresden (Postdoc); Swedish University of Agricultural Sciences (Docent, 2003)
- Children: 2
- Scientific career
- Fields: Limnology
- Workplaces: Uppsala University
- Website: https://weyhenmeyer.weebly.com/

Gesa A. Weyhenmeyer (born 1969) is a Swedish limnologist who explores how Earth's diverse and fascinating lake ecosystems respond to the accelerating pace of change in the world. She is working as a professor and distinguished teacher at Uppsala University in Sweden and member of the Royal Swedish Academy of Sciences. Internationally, she is renowned for her pioneering research on the functioning of lake ecosystems within the Earth System, exemplified by her contribution to a shift in scientific theory from viewing lakes as passive conduits of energy and matter in the global carbon cycle to recognizing them as quantitatively important and highly active transformers. Her research requires a holistic and global perspective, for which she collaborates with members of the Global Lake Ecological Observatory Network (GLEON). In addition to GLEON, Weyhenmeyer is actively engaged in the Intergovernmental Panel on Climate Change (IPCC), both as official reviewer and contributing author.

Apart from developing novel ideas and concepts in the field of global limnology, bridging together biology with geosciences, physics, chemistry, sensor technology and data science, Weyhenmeyer has a passion to communicate research to students, policy-makers, stakeholders and society in general. In 2016, she performed, for example, a citizen scientist project with the involvement of nearly 3,500 schoolchildren. The results of the project led to a new climate change related scientific discovery which was recognized by a large variety of national and international media. In December 2020, Weyhenmeyer and scientist Will Steffen were among the initiators of an open letter in the Guardian, calling for human civilization to prepare for the possibility of collapse within the 21st century in light of the impending failure to implement timely climate actions.
