= Chena (district) =

District in south west Ethiopia

Coordinates: 7°15′N 35°45′E

Chena is a district in the South West Region of Ethiopia. The name Chena comes from one of the provinces in the former Kingdom of Kaffa, whose administrative center had been at Wacha. Part of the Keffa Zone, Chena is bordered on the south by the Bench Maji Zone, on the west by Bita, on the north by Gewata, on the northeast by Ginbo, and on the east by Decha. Towns in Chena include Shishinda. Western kebeles of Chena were used to form Bita district.

== Demographics ==
Based on the 2007 Census conducted by the CSA, this district has a total population of 158,449, of whom 78,150 are men and 80,299 women; 11,629 or 7.34% of its population are urban dwellers. The majority of the inhabitants were Protestants, with 43.62% of the population reporting that belief, 40.84% practiced Ethiopian Orthodox Christianity, 7.95% practiced traditional beliefs, 3.9% were Muslim, and 3.09% embraced Catholicism.

In the 1994 national census Chena had a population of 153,646, of whom 75,745 were men and 77,901 women; 12,887 or 8.39% of its population were urban dwellers. The four largest ethnic groups reported in this district were the Kafficho (75.76%), the Bench (16.19%), the Oromo (3.5%), and the Amhara (2.73%); all other ethnic groups made up 1.82% of the population. Kafa was spoken as a first language by 75.43% of the inhabitants, 18.36% spoke Bench, 3.6% spoke Amharic, and 3.09% spoke Oromiffa; the remaining 5.6% spoke all other primary languages reported. Concerning education, 16.97% of the population were considered literate; 12.45% of children aged 7–12 were in primary school; 2.77% of the children aged 13–14 were in junior secondary school, and 2.13% of the inhabitants aged 15–18 were in senior secondary school. Concerning sanitary conditions, about 69% of the urban and 12% of the total had toilet facilities.
