= Gewata =

Region in SouthWestern Ethiopia

Gewata is a district in the South West Region of Ethiopia. Part of the Keffa Zone, Gewata is bordered on the south by Chena, on the west by Gesha, on the northwest by Sayilem, on the northeast by the Oromia Region, and on the southeast by Ginbo. Gewata was formed from parts of Ginbo and Gesha districts.

== Demographics ==
Based on the 2007 Census conducted by the CSA, this district has a total population of 72,473, of whom 35,764 are men and 36,709 women; 1,440 or 1.99% of its population are urban dwellers. The majority of the inhabitants practiced Ethiopian Orthodox Christianity, with 52.85% of the population reporting that belief, 28.93% were Protestants, and 17.49% were Muslim.
