= Tocha (woreda) =

Tocha is one of the woredas in the South West Ethiopia Peoples' Region of Ethiopia. Part of the Dawro Zone, Tocha is bordered on the south by Isara and Kechi woreda, on the west by the Kechi and Tarcha zuria woreda, on the north by Tarcha zuria woreda and on the east by Mareka. Towns in Tocha include Tocha. Tocha was disintegrated in to Kechi and Tarcha zuria woredas.

== Demographics ==
Based on the 2007 Census conducted by the CSA, this woreda has a total population of 102,848, of whom 52,481 are men and 50,367 women; 6,614 or 6.43% of its population are urban dwellers. The majority of the inhabitants practiced Ethiopian Orthodox Christianity, with 51.31% of the population reporting that belief, 44.35% were Protestants, and 3.71% practiced traditional beliefs.
