= Gesa Hansen =

German-Danish designer (born 1981)

Gesa Hansen (born June 1981 in Arnsberg) is a German-Danish designer.

== Education ==
Hansen graduated from the Bauhaus University (Germany) and from NZU, Nagoya University of Arts, (Japan).

== Career ==
Hansen enhanced her training in Paris working for Jean Nouvel Atelier and H5 but also in Japan at the Nippon Design Center.

Following a long family tradition of Danish designers, she founded her design studio in 2009: The Hansen Family.

Hansen's work was exhibited at DesignMai in Berlin (Germany), at 100% Design festival in Seoul (Korea), at Artlab in Brussels (Belgium), at Benetton Group's Fabrica research centre in Treviso and Bologna (Italy), at Salone del Mobile (Italy), at ICFF in New-York and at Meet My Project in Paris and in Milan.

Hansen's work was awarded by two Red Dot Design Awards and the Good Design Award.

== Works ==
- 2011. Remix Dining Table (manufactured by The Hansen Family).
- 2011. Remix Drunk (manufactured by The Hansen Family).
- 2010. Bee Coffee Table (manufactured by H+H, Hans Hansen Furniture).
- 2010. Black Remix - a Surface 2 Air collaboration (manufactured by The Hansen Family).
- 2010. Parisien Trunk, designed with Kistuné (manufactured by The Hansen Family).
- 2010. Remix Sideboard (manufactured by The Hansen Family). Award: Red Dot Design Award 2010
- 2009. Remix Trunk (manufactured by The Hansen Family).
- 2009. Remix Desk (manufactured by The Hansen Family). Awards: Red Dot Design Award 2010 and The Good Design Award 2010.
- 2009. Remix Coffee Table (manufactured by The Hansen Family).
- 2009. Origami Barstool (manufactured by H+H, Hans Hansen Furniture)
- 2008. Horizon Wardrobe (manufactured by H+H, Hans Hansen Furniture)

== Quotes ==
- "Minimalism hates ornements, but ornements love minimalism" - Gesa Hansen, at Imm Cologne, 2009.
