= Mareka =

Woreda in the South West Ethiopia Peoples' Region

Mareka is one of the woredas in the South West Ethiopia Peoples' Region of Ethiopia. Part of the Dawro Zone, Mareka is bordered on the southwest by Isara, on the west by Tocha, on the northeast by Gena Bosa, and on the southeast by Loma. Towns in Mareka include Wacca. Mareka was part of former Mareka Gena woreda.

== Demographics ==
Based on the 2007 Census conducted by the CSA, this woreda has a total population of 126,022, of whom 65,321 are men and 60,701 women; 18,988 or 15.07% of its population are urban dwellers. The majority of the inhabitants were Protestants, with 62.05% of the population reporting that belief, 26.76% practiced Ethiopian Orthodox Christianity, 5.57% embraced Catholicism, and 5.15% practiced traditional beliefs.
