= Bonga =

Capital of South West Ethiopia Peoples' Region, Ethiopia

- Town, woreda and capital city
- Location within Ethiopia
- Coordinates: 7°16′N 36°14′E
- Country: Ethiopia
- Region: South West Ethiopia Peoples' Region
- Zone: Keffa
- Elevation: 1,714 m (5,623 ft)

Population (2022)
  - Total: 56,045
- Time zone: UTC+3 (EAT)
- Climate: Am

Bonga is a town, woreda and one of the multicapital of the South West Ethiopia Peoples' Region in Ethiopia. Located in the Keffa Zone upon a hill in the upper Barta valley, it has a latitude and longitude of 7°16′N 36°14′E with an elevation of 1,714 meters above sea level. Not confused with another town named "Bonga", near Gambela Region.

== Overview ==
The neighboring area is known for hot springs, caves and waterfalls. There are fourteenth century ruins associated with the former Kingdom of Kaffa. As part of the extensive road-building program started before the Italian invasion, the Ethiopian Transport Company built a large steel bridge at Bonga. The all-weather road from Jimma south to Bonga was completed around 1962. The road to Mizan Teferi and Tepi was improved in 1966 by the Highway Authority. The Apostolic Prefecture of Jimma–Bonga is based in this town.

According to the SNNPR's Bureau of Finance and Economic Development, as of 2003 Bonga's amenities include digital telephone access, postal service, 24-hour electrical service, a bank and a hospital. The high school draws students from a broad area. The city is a center for the buying of honey, coffee and cardamom.

== History ==
Bonga is thought to be the oldest city in western Ethiopia.

The first European recorded to have visited the capital of the former Kingdom of Kaffa was Antoine Thomson d'Abbadie, who resided for 11 days in the marketplace reserved for Christian traders in 1843. The royal residence at Bonga was not as elegant as those in Gomma, Gera, and Limmu-Ennarea. Capuchin monks founded a mission there in 1845 and discovered some medieval churches which remained as evidence of the early infiltration of Christian influence before the invasion of the Oromo.

When Paul Soleillet visited Bonga in the 1880s, he described its trade as primarily slaves, coffee, civet cat oil, coriander and ivory, the turnover amounting between 200,000 and 300,000 dollars a year. Following the conquest of Kaffa by the generals of Menelik II in 1897, Bonga was deserted; governor Ras Wolde Giyorgis made neighboring Anderaccha his capital.

Bonga was occupied 13 December 1936 by the Italians under General Malta, who died there the next year on 30 May. He and his successor Colonel Corrado refounded Bonga as a local administrative and commercial center for the production of coffee, hides, wax, maize, tea, etc. By 1938, there were about 3,000 inhabitants in the town, of whom about 200 were Italians, and it was equipped with a post office, telegraph, hospital, pharmacy, and spacci. There were few remains of early constructions, but the new settlement was well built from brick and tufa, covered by clay tiles or corrugated iron. Generals Bortello and Tosti, commanders of the Italian forces south of the Didessa River acknowledged their weak position and along with 2,850 troops on 28 June 1941 surrendered to Lt. Col. McNab of the King's African Rifles.

Telephone service reached Bonga between 1954 and 1967. Around 1970, there lived in Bonga one Idebe Godo who was the chief priest of a spirit possession cult. The high priesthood was hereditary to the family of the former high priests to the King of Kaffa.

== Climate ==
Bonga has a tropical monsoon climate (Köppen Am) with a short dry season in December and January and a lengthy though not intense wet season covering the remainder of the year. Although afternoons are very warm to hot throughout the year, mornings are cool enough to be close to a subtropical highland climate (Cwb).

Climate data for Bonga, elevation 1,725 m (5,659 ft)
Month	Jan	Feb	Mar	Apr	May	Jun	Jul	Aug	Sep	Oct	Nov	Dec	Year
Average precipitation mm (inches)	41.0 (1.61)	78.0 (3.07)	146.0 (5.75)	199.0 (7.83)	204.0 (8.03)	218.0 (8.58)	182.0 (7.17)	194.0 (7.64)	197.0 (7.76)	150.0 (5.91)	102.0 (4.02)	88.0 (3.46)	1,799 (70.83)
Average relative humidity (%)	59	62	67	71	75	76	74	72	75	79	69	66	70
Source: FAO

== Demographics ==
Based on the 2007 Census conducted by the CSA, this town has a total population of 20,858, of whom 10,736 are men and 10,122 women. The majority of the inhabitants practiced Ethiopian Orthodox Christianity, with 72.53% of the population reporting that belief. 11.17% were Muslim, 9.85% were Protestants, and 6.18% were Catholics.

The 1994 census reported it had a total population of 10,851 of whom 5,032 were men and 5,819 women.

Bonga is also home to many Uduk refugees from South Sudan.

== Sightseeing ==
In 2009, constructions for a National Coffee Museum started. Next to the National Coffee Museum lies the Kafa Biosphere Reserve Information Center where visitors can learn about flora and fauna of the region. Kafa Biosphere Reserve is a UNESCO Biosphere Reserve since 2010. It is the birthplace of wild Arabica coffee and is very rich in biodiversity.
