= Dawro people =

Ethnic group in southwestern Ethiopia

Dawro
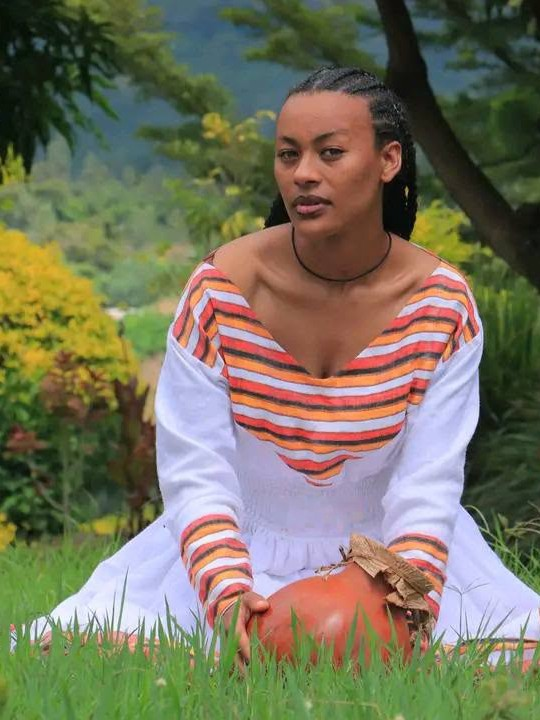

Total population
- 492,742 (2007)

Regions with significant populations
- Ethiopia

Languages
- Dawrotsuwa language

Religion
- Traditional religion, Christianity

Related ethnic groups
- Gamo, Gofa, Welayta, Kafficho

The Dawro are a people of south-western Ethiopia, also known as the Omete or Kullo. They speak the Dawrotsuwa language.

During the nineteenth century, the Dawro lived in an independent kingdom known as the Kingdom of Dawro. Today they live in the Dawro zone that consists of the woredas of Gena Bosa, Isara, Loma, Mareka and Tocha.

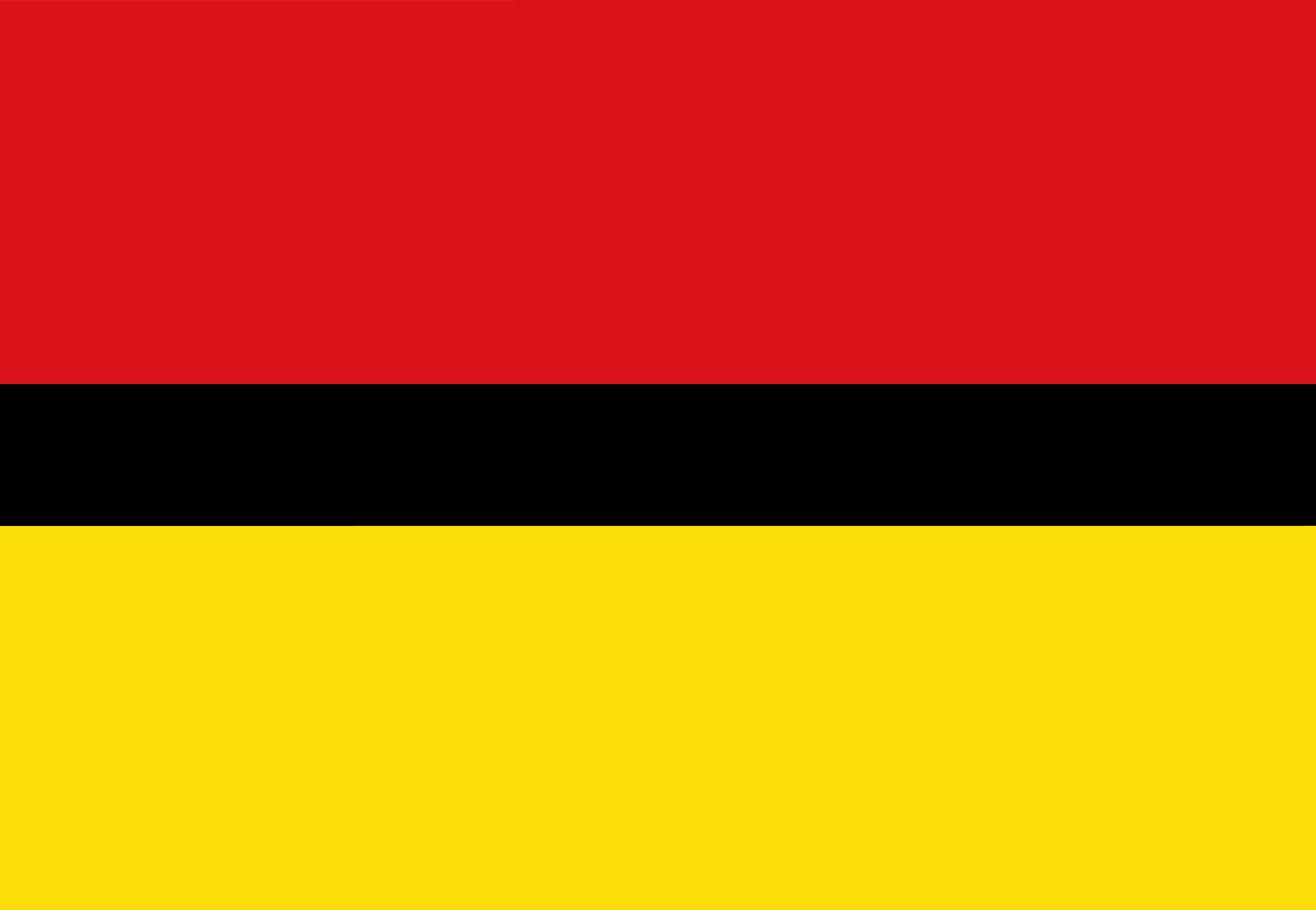
Traditional Dawro colors
