= Keffa Zone =

Zone in the South West Region of Ethiopia

Keffa or Kaffa is a zone in the South West Region of Ethiopia. The administrative center is Bonga.

== History ==
The Zone is named after the Kingdom of Kaffa. Kaffa was part of the Southern Nations, Nationalities, and Peoples' Region (SNNPR) until 2021 when a referendum was held. The result was to create a new region called the South West Ethiopia Peoples' Region and comprised the Kaffa Zone and five other nearby administrative areas of the SNNPR.

== Demographics ==
Based on the 2007 Census conducted by the CSA, this Zone has a total population of 2,151,716, of whom 1411,778 are men and 739,938 women; 152,036 or 7.44% are urban inhabitants. The four largest ethnic groups reported in this Zone were the Kafficho (82.72%), the Bench (5.05%), the Amhara (3.67%), and the Oromo (3.5%); all other ethnic groups made up 5.09% of the population. Kafa is spoken as a first language by 82.49%, 4.18% speak Amharic, 5.13% Bench, and 3.43% speak Oromiffa; the remaining 4.77% spoke all other primary languages reported. 61.42% of the population said they practiced Ethiopian Orthodox Christianity, 24.84% were Protestants, 6.2% were Muslim, 5.37% practiced traditional beliefs, and 1.73% embraced Catholicism.

== Economy and environment ==
Southern Ethiopia, including Sidamo, Kaffa, Arsi and Harar is the original home of coffee which grows wild here in the mountain rain forests in countless varieties. All plants of the species Coffea arabica around the world are descendants of plants from southern Ethiopia. The word coffee is coined after the zone.

Coffee has long been the main source of income, but due to the sharply declining world prices for coffee, the residents increasingly have to grow other crops. By turning rain forests into new agricultural land, the structure of the region is heavily damaged.

The rain forests that dominated the region of Kaffa earlier are reduced to only 3% of their original size, in the last 30 years 60% of the trees were lost.

For some years there is a large rain forest conservation project, which relies on the use of the last wild stocks of coffee growing in the rain forest. Currently, some 30 cooperatives are harvesting and marketing this specialty coffee and have helped over 40,000 people to get income.

In 2010, an area within the Kaffa province was recognised as a UNESCO Biosphere Reserve as part of the Man and the Biosphere Programme. Officially named the "Kafa Biosphere Reserve" it is one of the first two biosphere reserves in Ethiopia and aims to protect the natural environment and foster sustainable development in the region. Lions were photographed in the reserve in 2012, the first documenting of that species in montane rainforest.

== Woredas ==
Woredas and City administrations in Kaffa Zone
Number	Woredas	Seat
1	Adiyo	Kaka
2	Bita district	Bita Genet
3	Chena	Wacha*
4	Cheta	Shama
5	Decha	Awurada*
6	Gesha	Daka*
7	Gewata	Qonda
8	Ginbo	Ufa
9	Goba	Uda Dish
10	Menjiwo	Adiya Kaka
11	Sayilem	Yadota
12	Shisho Ende	Shishinda*
13	Telo	Oda

* Town administrations, which are considered as Woreda for all administrative purposes. Bonga which is administrative capital of the zone and Southwest Ethiopia Regional State is also one of town administration in this Zone.
