= Dawro Zone =

Zone in the South West Ethiopia Peoples' Region

Coordinates: 7°0′N 37°10′E

Map of the regions and zones of Ethiopia

Dawuro (or Dawro) is a zone in the Southwest Region of Ethiopia. The name "Dawuro" represents both the land and the people. It is located at about 500km southwest of Addis Ababa, the capital of Ethiopia, about 111 km west of Wolaita Sodo, the capital of South Ethiopia Regional State and 319 km of Hawassa the capital of the Sidama Region. Dawuro is bordered to the south by Gofa Zone, to the west by the Konta Zone to the north by the Jimma zone, to the northeast by Hadiya and Tembaro Special Woreda in Central Ethiopia Regional State, and to the east by Wolayita Zone.

The second-biggest hydroelectric power generation dam in Ethiopia, Gilgel Gibe III Dam, is being built on Omo river between Dawuro and Wolayita zones. Dawuro contains many tourist attractions. The newly built Halala Kela Luxury Resort is located at Gilgel Gibe III Dam in Loma (woreda) of Dawuro zone. The administrative center of Dawuro is Tarcha. Tarcha is situated at 70 14' north latitude and 370 5' east longitude and 1200m to approximately 1450m above sea level. Tarcha is 496 km from Addis Ababa through Jimma, and 489 km through Sodo. The second largest town in the Dawuro zone is Gesa.

Dawuro has 111 kilometers of all-weather roads and 123 kilometers of dry-weather roads, for an average road density of 53 kilometers per 1000 square kilometers. High points in this Zone include Atto, Issera, Umbuti, and Sadam among others.

Dawuro used to be part of the North Omo Zone, and the 1994 national census counted its inhabitants as part of that Zone. However friction between the various ethnic groups in North Omo zone, which was often blamed on the Wolayta people for "ethnic chauvinism" and despite the efforts of the ruling party to emphasize the need to coordinate, consolidate, and unify the smaller ethnic units to achieve the "efficient use of scarce government resources", led to the division of the zone in 2000, resulting with the creation of the Dawuro, Gamo Gofa, and Wolayita Zones, and two special districts.

== Demographics ==
1994
1. Dawro religion (48.5%)
2. Ethiopian Orthodox Christianity (33.9%)
3. Evangelical Protestantism (16.6%)
2007
1. Evangelical Protestantism (57.7%)
2. Ethiopian Orthodox Christianity (31.9%)
3. Dawro religion (4.90%)
4. Catholicism (4.61%)

Based on the 2007 Census conducted by the Central Statistical Agency of Ethiopia (CSA), this zone has a total population of 489,577, of whom 249,263 are men and 240,314 women; with an area of 4,814.52 square kilometers, Dawuro has a population density of 101.69. While 35,044 or 7.16% are urban inhabitants, a further 14 individuals are pastoralists. A total of 89,915 households were counted in this Zone, which results in an average of 5.44 persons to household, and 86,642 housing units. The two largest ethnic groups reported in this zone included the Dawro (97.32%), and the Hadiya (1.3%); all other ethnic groups made up 1.38% of the population. Dawurtsho is spoken as a first language by 97.44% of the inhabitants, and 1.3% speak Hadiya; the remaining 1.26% spoke all other primary languages reported. 57.71% of the population said they were Protestants, 31.86% practiced Ethiopian Orthodox Christianity, 4.9% observed traditional religions, and 4.61% embraced Catholicism.

Dawro is one of the ethnic groups in Ethiopia that uses its own character set of the Ethiopic syllabary.

== Woredas ==
Woredas and town administration districts in the Dawro Zone include:

- Disa
- Esera
- Gena Bosa
- Gesa Town Administration
- Kechi
- Loma
- Mareka
- Mari Mansa
- Tarcha Town administration
- Tarcha Zuria
- Tocha
- Waka Town administration
- Zaba Gazo
