= Chara people =

The Chara, also known as the Tsara are a people group of Ethiopia. They form a part of the Gimira peoples of Ethiopia and live in the Kaffa Highlands, and the Debub Omo area.

Their three main villages are Geba a meša, Buna Anta, and Kumba, Ethiopia and they practise subsistence farming and hold to a syncretic religion of Oriental Orthodox Christianity with tribal practices. The Chara people speak their own Chara language a member of the Omotic Language group, which is linguistically similar to Mela and the numerically much larger Wolaytta both of which many Chara also speak. (See Ethiopian language map).

The number of Chara have been decimated due to slavery and war and are estimated to number between 16,500 and 6,984 (1994 census) people.
