= Konta people =

Omotic-speaking ethnic group in southwest Ethiopia

Konta people are an Omotic-speaking ethnic group indigenous to southwestern Ethiopia. According to 2007 census there are 83,607 Konta people, which makes up 0.11% of Ethiopia's total population. The population is distributed through south of Jimma and the Gojeb River. Since the dissolution of North Omo Zone in 2000, most Konta now live in Konta special woreda in South West Ethiopia Peoples' Region, where they make up around 85% of the total population. Konta language is the ancestral language of the Konta people, closely related to or a dialect of Dawro / Kullo. Most Konta adhere to Protestantism or Ethiopian Orthodox Tewahedo Church. Konta economy is based on agriculture and people cultivate ensete, sweet potatoes, taro, beans, teff and maize. The Kingdom of Konta was founded by the Konta people.
