= Kafficho people =

Ethiopian ethnic group

Kafficho
Kafficho (Kafa)
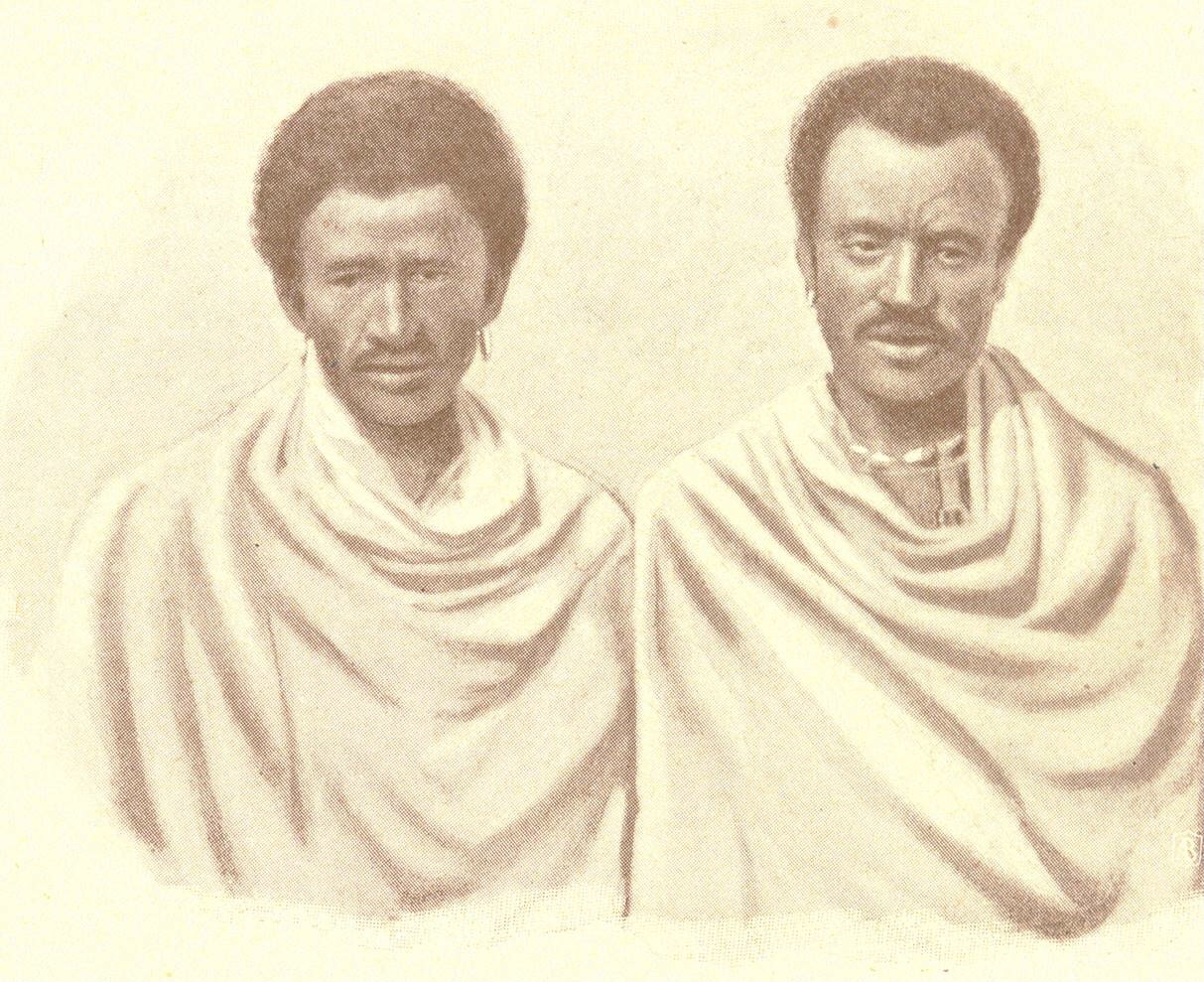
- Kafficho men, 1896

Total population
- 865,131 (2007)

Regions with significant populations
- Ethiopia

Languages
- Kafa

Religion
- Traditional religion, Christianity, Islam

Related ethnic groups
- Sheko, Shinasha, Dawro

- People: Kafficho
- Language: Kaffinono
- Country: Kaffa

The Kafficho people are an ethnic group hailing from Ethiopia. As of 2007, they accounted for only 1.2% of Ethiopia's population. Most of the Kafficho live in Ethiopia's Keffa, South West Ethiopia Peoples' Region region. Their traditional language, Kafa or Kaffinono, is still spoken among much of the population. Coffee may derive its name from the Kafa zone, where it was first cultivated, though this is considered unlikely.

The Kingdom of Kaffa was established in 1390 and lasted until 1897, when it was fully integrated into the Ethiopian Empire, of which it had previously been an intermittent tributary. While the Kingdom's economy had relied largely on the export of gold and slaves, the modern Kafficho are agriculturalists.

In September 2021, the Kaffa people held a referendum to create a new region, Ethiopia's 11th, called the South West and made up of Kaffa and five other nearby administrative areas.
