= List of Ethiopian regions by Human Development Index =

Regions of Ethiopia by Human Development Index in 2018 0.601 above 0.551 to 0.600 0.501 to 0.550 0.451 to 0.500 0.401 to 0.450

This is a list of Ethiopian regions and the chartered cities of Addis Ababa and Dire Dawa by Human Development Index as of 2025 with data for the year 2023.

Rank	Region	HDI (2023)
High human development
1	Addis Ababa	0.717
Medium human development
2	Dire Dawa	0.597
3	Harari Region	0.583
Low human development
4	Gambela Region	0.548
5	Tigray Region	0.530
–	Ethiopia	0.497
6	Benishangul-Gumuz Region	0.496
7	SNNP Region (including South West Region and Sidama Region)	0.494
8	Oromia Region	0.491
9	Amhara Region	0.481
10	Afar Region	0.471
11	Somali Region	0.433

== See also ==
- List of subnational entities by Human Development Index
