= List of subnational entities by Human Development Index =

World map of subnational regions categorized by Human Development Index (HDI) values, based on 2023 data (published in 2025): ≥0.800 0.700 – 0.799 0.550 – 0.699 <0.550

The following list shows the subnational entities and regions included in the Human Development Index report, sorted by their score. The HDI is a summary measure of human development that considers three dimensions: health, education, and standard of living. It is calculated by taking the geometric mean of three normalized indicators: life expectancy at birth, mean and expected years of schooling, and gross national income per capita. The HDI ranges from 0 to 1, with higher values indicating higher human development. The HDI itself was created by Pakistani economist Mahbub ul Haq in 1990 and was later used by the UNDP to measure countries' development in its annual Human Development Reports. The index was initially calculated at the country level. The Global Data Lab at Radboud University in the Netherlands launched a subnational HDI (SHDI) in 2018, which covers around 1,800 regions across more than 160 countries to reflect differences within countries better. Global Data Lab also provides the Subnational Human the Subnational Gender Development Index (SGDI) and data on income, years of education and life expectancy on the subnational level. The SHDI and SGDI are based on the UNDP's official HDI and GDI, but they use subnational data in addition to national data.

== List ==
Based on the Human Development Index report, as compiled by the United Nations Development Programme (UNDP), which does not include states with limited recognition who are non-UN Member States.

Note: The scores here are from the most recent HDI report as of February 3rd, 2026, which used 2023 country data to calculate them.

Rank	Region	Country	Continent	National HDI	National Rank	Regional HDI
Very high human development
1	Zurich	Switzerland	Europe	0.970	1	0.993
2	Australian Capital Territory	Australia	Asia/Pacific	0.958	1	0.988
3	Oslo og Akershus	Norway	Europe	0.970	1	0.982
4	London	United Kingdom	Europe	0.946	1	0.982
5	Berlin	Germany	Europe	0.959	1	0.977
6	Hamburg	Germany	Europe	0.959	2	0.977
7	Stockholm	Sweden	Europe	0.959	1	0.976
8	Lake Geneva region	Switzerland	Europe	0.970	2	0.976
9	Prague	Czech Republic	Europe	0.915	1	0.975
10	Vestlandet	Norway	Europe	0.970	2	0.974
11	Western Australia	Australia	Asia/Pacific	0.958	2	0.973
12	Baden-Wurttemberg	Germany	Europe	0.959	3	0.972
13	Trondelag	Norway	Europe	0.970	3	0.972
14	Hovedstaden	Denmark	Europe	0.962	1	0.971
15	Agder og Rogaland	Norway	Europe	0.970	4	0.970
16	Utrecht	Netherlands	Europe	0.955	1	0.969
17	Wellington	New Zealand	Asia/Pacific	0.938	1	0.968
18	Osrednjeslovenska	Slovenia	Europe	0.931	1	0.968
19	Helsinki-Uusimaa	Finland	Europe	0.948	1	0.967
20	Bayern	Germany	Europe	0.959	4	0.967
21	Auckland	New Zealand	Asia/Pacific	0.938	2	0.967
22	Bratislavsky kraj	Slovakia	Europe	0.880	1	0.967
23	Capital Region	South Korea	Asia/Pacific	0.937	1	0.967
24	Prov. Antwerpen	Belgium	Europe	0.951	1	0.966
25	Ticino	Switzerland	Europe	0.970	3	0.965
26	Noord-Holland	Netherlands	Europe	0.955	2	0.964
27	Northwestern Switzerland	Switzerland	Europe	0.970	4	0.964
28	Hessen	Germany	Europe	0.959	5	0.963
29	Espace Mittelland	Switzerland	Europe	0.970	5	0.963
30	Nord-Norge	Norway	Europe	0.970	5	0.962
31	Central Switzerland	Switzerland	Europe	0.970	6	0.962
32	Bruxelles - Brussel	Belgium	Europe	0.951	2	0.961
33	Bremen	Germany	Europe	0.959	6	0.961
34	Massachusetts	United States	America	0.938	1	0.961
35	New Hampshire	United States	America	0.938	2	0.961
36	South East	United Kingdom	Europe	0.946	2	0.960
37	Minnesota	United States	America	0.938	3	0.960
38	Midtjylland	Denmark	Europe	0.962	2	0.959
39	Ile de France	France	Europe	0.92	1	0.959
40	Sor-Ostlandet	Norway	Europe	0.970	6	0.959
41	New South Wales	Australia	Asia/Pacific	0.958	3	0.958
42	Hedmark og Oppland	Norway	Europe	0.970	7	0.958
43	Mazowieckie	Poland	Europe	0.906	1	0.958
44	Vastsverige	Sweden	Europe	0.959	2	0.958
45	Colorado	United States	America	0.938	4	0.958
46	Prov. Vlaams-Brabant	Belgium	Europe	0.951	3	0.957
47	Prov. Brabant Wallon	Belgium	Europe	0.951	4	0.957
48	Ovre Norrland	Sweden	Europe	0.959	3	0.957
49	Hawaii	United States	America	0.938	5	0.957
50	Washington	United States	America	0.938	6	0.957
51	Prov. Oost-Vlaanderen	Belgium	Europe	0.951	5	0.955
52	Nordrhein-Westfalen	Germany	Europe	0.959	7	0.955
53	Noord-Brabant	Netherlands	Europe	0.955	3	0.955
54	Eastern Switzerland	Switzerland	Europe	0.970	7	0.955
55	Connecticut	United States	America	0.938	7	0.955
56	Vermont	United States	America	0.938	8	0.955
57	Victoria	Australia	Asia/Pacific	0.958	4	0.954
58	City of Zagreb	Croatia	Europe	0.889	1	0.954
59	Zuid-Holland	Netherlands	Europe	0.955	4	0.954
60	Sachsen	Germany	Europe	0.959	8	0.953
61	Dublin	Ireland	Europe	0.949	1	0.953
62	Wien	Austria	Europe	0.930	1	0.952
63	Alberta	Canada	America	0.939	1	0.952
64	District of Columbia	United States	America	0.938	9	0.952
65	Southern-Kanto (Saitama, Chiba, Tokyo, Kanagawa, Yamanashi, Nagano)	Japan	Asia/Pacific	0.925	1	0.951
66	Groningen	Netherlands	Europe	0.955	5	0.951
67	Comunidad de Madrid	Spain	Europe	0.918	1	0.951
68	British Columbia	Canada	America	0.939	2	0.950
69	Kozep-Magyarorszag	Hungary	Europe	0.870	1	0.95
70	South-West	Ireland	Europe	0.949	2	0.949
71	Oregon	United States	America	0.938	10	0.949
72	Salzburg	Austria	Europe	0.930	2	0.948
73	Prov. West-Vlaanderen	Belgium	Europe	0.951	6	0.948
74	Syddanmark	Denmark	Europe	0.962	3	0.948
75	Rheinland-Pfalz	Germany	Europe	0.959	9	0.948
76	Ostra Mellansverige	Sweden	Europe	0.959	4	0.948
77	Smaland med oarna	Sweden	Europe	0.959	5	0.948
78	Sydsverige	Sweden	Europe	0.959	6	0.948
79	New Jersey	United States	America	0.938	11	0.948
80	Virginia	United States	America	0.938	12	0.948
81	Queensland	Australia	Asia/Pacific	0.958	5	0.947
82	Pohja-Eesti	Estonia	Europe	0.905	1	0.947
83	Riga region	Latvia	Europe	0.889	1	0.947
84	Pais Vasco	Spain	Europe	0.918	2	0.947
85	Maryland	United States	America	0.938	13	0.947
86	Prov. Limburg	Belgium	Europe	0.951	7	0.946
87	Ontario	Canada	America	0.939	3	0.946
88	Mellersta Norrland	Sweden	Europe	0.959	7	0.946
89	Aland	Finland	Europe	0.948	2	0.945
90	Niedersachsen	Germany	Europe	0.959	10	0.945
91	North Dakota	United States	America	0.938	14	0.945
92	Rhode Island	United States	America	0.938	15	0.945
93	South Australia	Australia	Asia/Pacific	0.958	6	0.944
94	Northern Territory	Australia	Asia/Pacific	0.958	7	0.944
95	Saarland	Germany	Europe	0.959	11	0.944
96	West	Ireland	Europe	0.949	3	0.944
97	Mid-East	Ireland	Europe	0.949	4	0.944
98	Provincia Autonoma di Trento	Italy	Europe	0.915	1	0.944
99	Gelderland	Netherlands	Europe	0.955	6	0.944
100	Limburg	Netherlands	Europe	0.955	7	0.944
101	Emilia-Romagna	Italy	Europe	0.915	2	0.943
102	Overijssel	Netherlands	Europe	0.955	8	0.942
103	South West	United Kingdom	Europe	0.946	3	0.942
104	New York	United States	America	0.938	16	0.942
105	Utah	United States	America	0.938	17	0.942
106	Tirol	Austria	Europe	0.930	3	0.941
107	Nordjylland	Denmark	Europe	0.962	4	0.941
108	Lansi-Suomi	Finland	Europe	0.948	3	0.941
109	Canterbury	New Zealand	Asia/Pacific	0.938	3	0.941
110	Norra Mellansverige	Sweden	Europe	0.959	8	0.941
111	Nebraska	United States	America	0.938	18	0.941
112	Wyoming	United States	America	0.938	19	0.941
113	Taranaki	New Zealand	Asia/Pacific	0.938	4	0.940
114	Alaska	United States	America	0.938	20	0.940
115	California	United States	America	0.938	21	0.940
116	Illinois	United States	America	0.938	22	0.940
117	Maine	United States	America	0.938	23	0.940
118	South Dakota	United States	America	0.938	24	0.940
119	Schleswig-Holstein	Germany	Europe	0.959	12	0.939
120	Mid-West	Ireland	Europe	0.949	5	0.939
121	Wisconsin	United States	America	0.938	25	0.939
122	Etela-Suomi	Finland	Europe	0.948	4	0.938
123	Lazio	Italy	Europe	0.915	3	0.938
124	Bucuresti	Romania	Europe	0.845	1	0.938
125	Pennsylvania	United States	America	0.938	26	0.938
126	Thuringen	Germany	Europe	0.959	13	0.937
127	Marlborough	New Zealand	Asia/Pacific	0.938	5	0.937
128	Scotland	United Kingdom	Europe	0.946	4	0.937
129	Brandenburg	Germany	Europe	0.959	14	0.936
130	Lombardia	Italy	Europe	0.915	4	0.936
131	Comunidad Foral de Navarra	Spain	Europe	0.918	3	0.936
132	Tasmania	Australia	Asia/Pacific	0.958	8	0.935
133	Pohjois-ja Ita-Suomi	Finland	Europe	0.948	5	0.935
134	Otago	New Zealand	Asia/Pacific	0.938	6	0.935
135	Florida	United States	America	0.938	27	0.935
136	Vilnius County	Lithuania	Europe	0.895	1	0.934
137	Gyeongnam Region	South Korea	Asia/Pacific	0.937	2	0.934
138	East of England	United Kingdom	Europe	0.946	5	0.934
139	Iowa	United States	America	0.938	28	0.934
140	Montana	United States	America	0.938	29	0.934
141	Prince Edward Island, Yukon Territory, Northwest Territories, Nunavut	Canada	America	0.939	4	0.933
142	Rhone-Alpes	France	Europe	0.920	2	0.933
143	Attiki	Greece	Europe	0.908	1	0.933
144	South-East	Ireland	Europe	0.949	6	0.933
145	Flevoland	Netherlands	Europe	0.955	9	0.933
146	Delaware	United States	America	0.938	30	0.933
147	Mecklenburg-Vorpommern	Germany	Europe	0.959	15	0.932
148	Obalno-kraska	Slovenia	Europe	0.931	2	0.932
149	North West	United Kingdom	Europe	0.946	6	0.932
150	Friesland	Netherlands	Europe	0.955	10	0.931
151	Waikato	New Zealand	Asia/Pacific	0.938	7	0.931
152	Tasman - Nelson	New Zealand	Asia/Pacific	0.938	8	0.931
153	East Midlands	United Kingdom	Europe	0.946	7	0.931
154	Kansas	United States	America	0.938	31	0.931
155	Quebec	Canada	America	0.939	5	0.930
156	Sachsen-Anhalt	Germany	Europe	0.959	16	0.930
157	Toscana	Italy	Europe	0.915	5	0.930
158	Zeeland	Netherlands	Europe	0.955	11	0.930
159	Bay of Plenty	New Zealand	Asia/Pacific	0.938	9	0.930
160	West Midlands	United Kingdom	Europe	0.946	8	0.930
161	Sjaelland	Denmark	Europe	0.962	5	0.929
162	Dolnoslaskie	Poland	Europe	0.906	2	0.929
163	Cataluna	Spain	Europe	0.918	4	0.929
164	Southland	New Zealand	Asia/Pacific	0.938	10	0.928
165	Kansai region (Shiga, Kyoto, Osaka, Hyogo, Nara, Wakayama)	Japan	Asia/Pacific	0.925	2	0.927
166	Idaho	United States	America	0.938	32	0.927
167	Steiermark	Austria	Europe	0.930	4	0.926
168	Provincia Autonoma di Bolzano	Italy	Europe	0.915	6	0.926
169	Friuli-Venezia Giulia	Italy	Europe	0.915	7	0.926
170	Drenthe	Netherlands	Europe	0.955	12	0.926
171	Yorkshire and The Humber	United Kingdom	Europe	0.946	9	0.926
172	County of Primorje-Gorski Kotar	Croatia	Europe	0.889	2	0.925
173	Toukai (Gifu, Shizuoka, Aichi, Mie)	Japan	Asia/Pacific	0.925	3	0.925
174	Saskatchewan	Canada	America	0.939	6	0.924
175	Jihovychod	Czech Republic	Europe	0.915	2	0.924
176	Malopolskie	Poland	Europe	0.906	3	0.924
177	Center (Riadh, Qassim)	Saudi Arabia	Asia/Pacific	0.900	1	0.928
178	Gorenjska	Slovenia	Europe	0.931	3	0.924
179	La Rioja	Spain	Europe	0.918	5	0.924
180	Marche	Italy	Europe	0.915	8	0.923
181	Aragon	Spain	Europe	0.918	6	0.923
182	Michigan	United States	America	0.938	33	0.923
183	Veneto	Italy	Europe	0.915	9	0.922
184	Oberosterreich	Austria	Europe	0.930	5	0.921
185	Provence-Alpes-Cote dAzur	France	Europe	0.920	3	0.921
186	Liguria	Italy	Europe	0.915	10	0.921
187	Chugoku (Tottori, Shimane, Okayama, Hiroshima, Yamaguchi)	Japan	Asia/Pacific	0.925	4	0.921
188	Nevada	United States	America	0.938	34	0.921
189	Vorarlberg	Austria	Europe	0.930	6	0.920
190	Prov. Namur	Belgium	Europe	0.951	8	0.920
191	Midi-Pyrenees	France	Europe	0.920	4	0.920
192	Piemonte	Italy	Europe	0.915	11	0.920
193	Hawkes Bay	New Zealand	Asia/Pacific	0.938	11	0.920
194	Chungcheong Region	South Korea	Asia/Pacific	0.937	3	0.920
195	Castilla y Leon	Spain	Europe	0.918	7	0.920
196	Wielkopolskie	Poland	Europe	0.906	4	0.919
197	Pomorskie	Poland	Europe	0.906	5	0.919
198	Ohio	United States	America	0.938	35	0.919
199	Midland	Ireland	Europe	0.949	7	0.918
200	West Coast	New Zealand	Asia/Pacific	0.938	12	0.918
201	Cantabria	Spain	Europe	0.918	8	0.918
202	North Carolina	United States	America	0.938	36	0.918
203	County of Istria	Croatia	Europe	0.889	3	0.917
204	Aquitaine	France	Europe	0.920	5	0.917
205	Umbria	Italy	Europe	0.915	12	0.917
206	Area Metropolitana de Lisboa	Portugal	Europe	0.890	1	0.917
207	Jeolla Region	South Korea	Asia/Pacific	0.937	4	0.917
208	Galicia	Spain	Europe	0.918	9	0.917
209	Arizona	United States	America	0.938	37	0.917
210	Texas	United States	America	0.938	38	0.917
211	Karnten	Austria	Europe	0.93	7	0.916
212	Prov. Liege	Belgium	Europe	0.951	9	0.916
213	Border	Ireland	Europe	0.949	8	0.916
214	Goriska	Slovenia	Europe	0.931	4	0.916
215	North East	United Kingdom	Europe	0.946	10	0.916
216	Pays de la Loire	France	Europe	0.920	6	0.915
217	Wales	United Kingdom	Europe	0.946	11	0.915
218	Georgia	United States	America	0.938	39	0.915
219	Missouri	United States	America	0.938	40	0.915
220	Alsace	France	Europe	0.920	7	0.914
221	Manawatu-Wanganui	New Zealand	Asia/Pacific	0.938	13	0.914
222	North (Northern Borders, Al Jawf, Hail)	Saudi Arabia	Asia/Pacific	0.9	2	0.914
223	Gangwon Region	South Korea	Asia/Pacific	0.937	5	0.914
224	Principado de Asturias	Spain	Europe	0.918	10	0.914
225	Nova Scotia	Canada	America	0.939	7	0.913
226	Bretagne	France	Europe	0.92	8	0.913
227	Northern-Kanto, Koshin [sic] (Ibaraki, Tochigi, Gunma)	Japan	Asia/Pacific	0.925	5	0.913
228	Northern Ireland	United Kingdom	Europe	0.946	12	0.913
229	Indiana	United States	America	0.938	41	0.913
230	Beijing	China	Asia/Pacific	0.797	1	0.912
231	Prov. Luxembourg	Belgium	Europe	0.951	10	0.911
232	Manitoba	Canada	America	0.939	8	0.911
233	County of Dubrovnik-Neretva	Croatia	Europe	0.889	4	0.911
234	Jeju	South Korea	Asia/Pacific	0.937	6	0.911
235	Slaskie	Poland	Europe	0.906	6	0.91
236	Abruzzo	Italy	Europe	0.915	13	0.909
237	Pieriga region	Latvia	Europe	0.889	2	0.909
238	Jugovzhodna Slovenija	Slovenia	Europe	0.931	5	0.909
239	New Brunswick	Canada	America	0.939	9	0.908
240	Region Metropolitana	Chile	America	0.878	1	0.908
241	Valle dAosta	Italy	Europe	0.915	14	0.908
242	Hokuriku (Niigata, Toyama, Ishikawa, Fukui)	Japan	Asia/Pacific	0.925	6	0.907
243	Savinjska	Slovenia	Europe	0.931	6	0.907
244	Yugozapaden	Bulgaria	Europe	0.845	1	0.905
245	Newfoundland and Labrador	Canada	America	0.939	10	0.905
246	Comunidad Valenciana	Spain	Europe	0.918	11	0.905
247	Tarapaca (incl Arica and Parinacota)	Chile	America	0.878	2	0.904
248	Kyushu (Fukuoka, Saga, Nagasaki, Kumamoto, Oita, Miyazaki, Kagoshima, Okinawa)	Japan	Asia/Pacific	0.925	7	0.904
249	South Carolina	United States	America	0.938	42	0.904
250	Tennessee	United States	America	0.938	43	0.904
251	Prov. Hainaut	Belgium	Europe	0.951	11	0.903
252	Languedoc-Roussillon	France	Europe	0.92	9	0.903
253	Shikoku (Tokushima, Kagawa, Ehime, Kochi)	Japan	Asia/Pacific	0.925	8	0.903
254	Podravska	Slovenia	Europe	0.931	7	0.902
255	Oklahoma	United States	America	0.938	44	0.902
256	Shanghai	China	Asia/Pacific	0.797	2	0.901
257	Stredni Morava	Czech Republic	Europe	0.915	3	0.901
258	Haute-Normandie	France	Europe	0.92	10	0.901
259	Poitou-Charentes	France	Europe	0.92	11	0.901
260	Kaunas County	Lithuania	Europe	0.895	2	0.901
261	Lodzkie	Poland	Europe	0.906	7	0.901
262	Antofagasta	Chile	America	0.878	3	0.9
263	Dytiki Makedonia	Greece	Europe	0.908	2	0.9
264	Auvergne	France	Europe	0.92	12	0.899
265	Northland	New Zealand	Asia/Pacific	0.938	14	0.899
266	Jihozapad	Czech Republic	Europe	0.915	4	0.898
267	Hokkaido	Japan	Asia/Pacific	0.925	9	0.898
268	Nord	France	Europe	0.92	13	0.897
269	Franche-Comte	France	Europe	0.92	14	0.897
270	Sterea Ellada	Greece	Europe	0.908	3	0.897
271	Koroska	Slovenia	Europe	0.931	8	0.897
272	Niederosterreich	Austria	Europe	0.93	8	0.896
273	Bourgogne	France	Europe	0.92	15	0.896
274	Limousin	France	Europe	0.92	16	0.896
275	Kriti	Greece	Europe	0.908	4	0.896
276	Gisborne	New Zealand	Asia/Pacific	0.938	15	0.896
277	Centre	France	Europe	0.92	17	0.895
278	Klaipeda County	Lithuania	Europe	0.895	3	0.895
279	West (Makka, Madinah, Tabuk)	Saudi Arabia	Asia/Pacific	0.9	3	0.895
280	New Mexico	United States	America	0.938	45	0.895
281	Burgenland	Austria	Europe	0.93	9	0.894
282	Valparaiso (former Aconcagua)	Chile	America	0.878	4	0.894
283	Thessalia	Greece	Europe	0.908	5	0.894
284	Molise	Italy	Europe	0.915	15	0.894
285	Champagne-Ardenne	France	Europe	0.92	18	0.893
286	Tohoku (Aomori, Iwate, Miyagi, Akita, Yamagata, Fukushima)	Japan	Asia/Pacific	0.925	10	0.893
287	Posavska	Slovenia	Europe	0.931	9	0.893
288	Region de Murcia	Spain	Europe	0.918	12	0.893
289	Magallanes and La Antartica Chilena	Chile	America	0.878	5	0.892
290	Ipeiros	Greece	Europe	0.908	6	0.892
291	Peloponnisos	Greece	Europe	0.908	7	0.892
292	Primorsko-notranjska	Slovenia	Europe	0.931	10	0.892
293	Louisiana	United States	America	0.938	46	0.892
294	County of Split-Dalmatia	Croatia	Europe	0.889	5	0.891
295	Severovychod	Czech Republic	Europe	0.915	5	0.891
296	Basse-Normandie	France	Europe	0.92	19	0.891
297	Kentriki Makedonia	Greece	Europe	0.908	8	0.891
298	Podlaskie	Poland	Europe	0.906	8	0.891
299	Notio Aigaio	Greece	Europe	0.908	9	0.89
300	Arkansas	United States	America	0.938	47	0.89
301	Kentucky	United States	America	0.938	48	0.89
302	Andalucia	Spain	Europe	0.918	13	0.889
303	Lorraine	France	Europe	0.92	20	0.888
304	Basilicata	Italy	Europe	0.915	16	0.888
305	Opolskie	Poland	Europe	0.906	9	0.888
306	Sardegna	Italy	Europe	0.915	17	0.887
307	Kujawsko-Pomorskie	Poland	Europe	0.906	10	0.887
308	Illes Balears	Spain	Europe	0.918	14	0.887
309	Alabama	United States	America	0.938	49	0.887
310	Ionia Nisia	Greece	Europe	0.908	10	0.886
311	Lubelskie	Poland	Europe	0.906	11	0.886
312	Eastern province	Saudi Arabia	Asia/Pacific	0.9	4	0.886
313	Istanbul	Turkey	Asia/Pacific	0.853	1	0.886
314	Zachodniopomorskie	Poland	Europe	0.906	12	0.884
315	Castilla-la Mancha	Spain	Europe	0.918	15	0.884
316	Extremadura	Spain	Europe	0.918	16	0.884
317	Canarias	Spain	Europe	0.918	17	0.884
318	Podkarpackie	Poland	Europe	0.906	13	0.883
319	Moravskoslezsko	Czech Republic	Europe	0.915	6	0.882
320	Voreio Aigaio	Greece	Europe	0.908	11	0.882
321	Atacama	Chile	America	0.878	6	0.881
322	County of Zadar	Croatia	Europe	0.889	6	0.881
323	Nyugat-Dunantul	Hungary	Europe	0.87	2	0.881
324	Centro	Portugal	Europe	0.89	2	0.881
325	Kurzeme region	Latvia	Europe	0.889	3	0.88
326	West Virginia	United States	America	0.938	50	0.88
327	Picardie	France	Europe	0.92	21	0.879
328	South (Bahah, Jizan, Asir, Najran)	Saudi Arabia	Asia/Pacific	0.9	5	0.879
329	Louna-Eesti	Estonia	Europe	0.905	2	0.878
330	Dytiki Ellada	Greece	Europe	0.908	12	0.878
331	Puglia	Italy	Europe	0.915	18	0.878
332	Vidzeme region	Latvia	Europe	0.889	4	0.878
333	Norte	Portugal	Europe	0.89	3	0.878
334	Montevideo and Metropolitan area	Uruguay	America	0.862	1	0.878
335	Swietokrzyskie	Poland	Europe	0.906	14	0.877
336	Tbilisi	Georgia	Asia/Pacific	0.844	1	0.876
337	Anatoliki Makedonia, Thraki	Greece	Europe	0.908	13	0.876
338	Campania	Italy	Europe	0.915	19	0.876
339	Kuala Lumpur Federal Territory	Malaysia	Asia/Pacific	0.819	1	0.876
340	Algarve	Portugal	Europe	0.89	4	0.875
341	Corse	France	Europe	0.92	22	0.874
342	Lubuskie	Poland	Europe	0.906	15	0.874
343	Ciudad Autonoma de Melilla	Spain	Europe	0.918	18	0.874
344	Gyeongbuk Region	South Korea	Asia/Pacific	0.937	7	0.873
345	Selangor	Malaysia	Asia/Pacific	0.819	2	0.872
346	Pomurska	Slovenia	Europe	0.931	11	0.872
347	Thimphu	Bhutan	Asia/Pacific	0.698	1	0.871
348	County of Zagreb	Croatia	Europe	0.889	7	0.871
349	County of Sibenik-Knin	Croatia	Europe	0.889	8	0.871
350	Zemgale region	Latvia	Europe	0.889	5	0.871
351	Centre	Montenegro	Europe	0.862	1	0.871
352	Panama	Panama	America	0.839	1	0.871
353	Zapadne Slovensko	Slovakia	Europe	0.88	2	0.871
354	Guadeloupe	France	Europe	0.92	23	0.87
355	Stredni Cechy	Czech Republic	Europe	0.915	7	0.869
356	West Anatolia (Ankara, Konya, Karaman)	Turkey	Asia/Pacific	0.853	2	0.869
357	Sicilia	Italy	Europe	0.915	20	0.868
358	Almaty city	Kazakhstan	Asia/Pacific	0.837	1	0.868
359	Siauliai County	Lithuania	Europe	0.895	4	0.868
360	Ciudad Autonoma de Ceuta	Spain	Europe	0.918	19	0.868
361	Mississippi	United States	America	0.938	51	0.868
362	NOA	Argentina	America	0.865	1	0.867
363	Tianjin	China	Asia/Pacific	0.797	3	0.867
364	County of Varazdin	Croatia	Europe	0.889	9	0.867
365	Kozep-Dunantul	Hungary	Europe	0.87	3	0.867
366	Del-Alfold	Hungary	Europe	0.87	4	0.867
367	Calabria	Italy	Europe	0.915	21	0.867
368	Gran Buenos Aires	Argentina	America	0.865	2	0.866
369	County of Medimurje	Croatia	Europe	0.889	10	0.866
370	Panevezys County	Lithuania	Europe	0.895	5	0.866
371	Cuyo	Argentina	America	0.865	3	0.865
372	Pampeana	Argentina	America	0.865	4	0.865
373	Telsiai County	Lithuania	Europe	0.895	6	0.865
374	Alentejo	Portugal	Europe	0.89	5	0.865
375	Patagonia	Argentina	America	0.865	5	0.864
376	Martinique	France	Europe	0.92	24	0.863
377	Belgrade	Serbia	Europe	0.833	1	0.863
378	Stredne Slovensko	Slovakia	Europe	0.88	3	0.863
379	Costa Este (Canelones, Maldonado and Rocha)	Uruguay	America	0.862	2	0.863
380	County of Osijek-Baranja	Croatia	Europe	0.889	11	0.862
381	Kirde-Eesti	Estonia	Europe	0.905	3	0.862
382	Warminsko-Mazurskie	Poland	Europe	0.906	16	0.862
383	East Marmara (Bilecik, Bolu, Bursa, Duzce, Eskiseh	Turkey	Asia/Pacific	0.853	3	0.862
384	Ahmadi	Kuwait	Asia/Pacific	0.852	1	0.861
385	Alytus County	Lithuania	Europe	0.895	7	0.861
386	Laane-Eesti	Estonia	Europe	0.905	4	0.86
387	Del-Dunantul	Hungary	Europe	0.87	5	0.86
388	County of Karlovac	Croatia	Europe	0.889	12	0.857
389	Reunion	France	Europe	0.92	25	0.857
390	Central region (Karagandinskaya)	Kazakhstan	Asia/Pacific	0.837	2	0.857
391	Coquimbo	Chile	America	0.878	7	0.856
392	County of Lika-Senj	Croatia	Europe	0.889	13	0.856
393	Latgale region	Latvia	Europe	0.889	6	0.856
394	North	Montenegro	Europe	0.862	2	0.856
395	West Marmara (Balikesir, Canakkale, Edirne, Kirkla	Turkey	Asia/Pacific	0.853	4	0.856
396	Severozapad	Czech Republic	Europe	0.915	8	0.854
397	Utena County	Lithuania	Europe	0.895	8	0.853
398	Pulau Pinang	Malaysia	Asia/Pacific	0.819	3	0.853
399	West (Ancash, Lima, Callao)	Peru	America	0.794	1	0.853
400	Zasavska	Slovenia	Europe	0.931	12	0.853
401	Aegean (Afyon, Aydin, Denizli, Izmir, Kutahya, Man	Turkey	Asia/Pacific	0.853	5	0.853
402	NEA	Argentina	America	0.865	6	0.852
403	Bio Bio	Chile	America	0.878	8	0.852
404	Chisinau	Moldova	Europe	0.785	1	0.852
405	Heredia	Costa Rica	America	0.833	1	0.851
406	Centro Sur (Flores, Florida and Lavalleja)	Uruguay	America	0.862	3	0.851
407	Eszak-Alfold	Hungary	Europe	0.87	6	0.85
408	North region (Akmolinskaya (incl Astana city), Kostnaiskaya, Pavlodarskaya, North-Kazakhstanskaya)	Kazakhstan	Asia/Pacific	0.837	3	0.85
409	Al Asimah, Hawalli, Al-Farwaniyah, Mubarak al-Sabah	Kuwait	Asia/Pacific	0.852	2	0.85
410	Marijampole County	Lithuania	Europe	0.895	9	0.85
411	San Jose	Costa Rica	America	0.833	2	0.849
412	Ajaria	Georgia	Asia/Pacific	0.844	2	0.849
413	Colon	Panama	America	0.839	2	0.849
414	Distrito Federal	Brazil	America	0.786	1	0.848
415	Vest	Romania	Europe	0.845	2	0.848
416	Nord-Vest	Romania	Europe	0.845	3	0.848
417	Yerevan	Armenia	Asia/Pacific	0.811	1	0.847
418	County of Koprivnica-Krizevc	Croatia	Europe	0.889	14	0.847
419	OHiggins	Chile	America	0.878	9	0.846
420	County of Sisak-Moslavina	Croatia	Europe	0.889	15	0.846
421	Distrito Federal	Mexico	America	0.789	1	0.845
422	South	Montenegro	Europe	0.862	3	0.844
423	Regiao Autonoma da Madeira	Portugal	Europe	0.89	6	0.844
424	Vychodne Slovensko	Slovakia	Europe	0.88	4	0.844
425	Kesk-Eesti	Estonia	Europe	0.905	5	0.843
426	Melaka	Malaysia	Asia/Pacific	0.819	4	0.842
427	Mediterranean (Adana, Antalya, Burdur, Hatay, Ispa	Turkey	Asia/Pacific	0.853	6	0.842
428	Imereti Racha-Lochkhumi Kvemo Svaneti	Georgia	Asia/Pacific	0.844	3	0.841
429	Al-Jahra	Kuwait	Asia/Pacific	0.852	3	0.841
430	Taurage County	Lithuania	Europe	0.895	10	0.84
431	Centru	Romania	Europe	0.845	4	0.84
432	Chiriqui	Panama	America	0.839	3	0.839
433	Herrera	Panama	America	0.839	4	0.838
434	Eszak-Magyarorszag	Hungary	Europe	0.87	7	0.837
435	Negeri Sembilan	Malaysia	Asia/Pacific	0.819	5	0.837
436	Tirana	Albania	Europe	0.81	1	0.836
437	Jiangsu	China	Asia/Pacific	0.797	4	0.836
438	County of Brod-Posavina	Croatia	Europe	0.889	16	0.836
439	Tehran and Alborz	Iran	Asia/Pacific	0.799	1	0.836
440	Minsk region	Belarus	Europe	0.824	1	0.835
441	Bogota D.C.	Colombia	America	0.788	1	0.835
442	County of Bjelovar-Bilogora	Croatia	Europe	0.889	17	0.835
443	County of Vukovar-Srijem	Croatia	Europe	0.889	18	0.835
444	Aisen	Chile	America	0.878	10	0.834
445	County of Krapina-Zagorje	Croatia	Europe	0.889	19	0.834
446	Centro (Durazno and Tacuarembo)	Uruguay	America	0.862	4	0.834
447	Johor	Malaysia	Asia/Pacific	0.819	6	0.833
448	Skopski	North Macedonia	Europe	0.815	1	0.833
449	Los Santos	Panama	America	0.839	5	0.833
450	The North West Federal District	Russia	Europe	0.832	1	0.833
451	The Urals Federal District	Russia	Europe	0.832	2	0.833
452	Bangkok	Thailand	Asia/Pacific	0.798	1	0.833
453	Cartago	Costa Rica	America	0.833	3	0.832
454	Central Anatolia (Kayseri, Kirsehir, Nevsehir, Nig	Turkey	Asia/Pacific	0.853	7	0.832
455	Esfahan	Iran	Asia/Pacific	0.799	2	0.831
456	Alajuela	Costa Rica	America	0.833	4	0.83
457	County of Pozega-Slavonia	Croatia	Europe	0.889	20	0.83
458	West region (Aktyubinskaya, Atyrauskaya, Mangistauskaya, West-Kazakhstanskaya)	Kazakhstan	Asia/Pacific	0.837	4	0.829
459	Regiao Autonoma dos Acores	Portugal	Europe	0.89	7	0.829
460	Mtskheta-Mtianeti	Georgia	Asia/Pacific	0.844	4	0.828
461	Norte (Artigas, Rivera, Cerro Largo and Trienta y Tres)	Uruguay	America	0.862	5	0.828
462	Western herzegovina	Bosnia and Herzegovina	Europe	0.804	1	0.827
463	Litoral Sur (Soriano, Colonia and San Jose)	Uruguay	America	0.862	6	0.827
464	The Central Federal District	Russia	Europe	0.832	3	0.826
465	Vojvodina	Serbia	Europe	0.833	2	0.826
466	East Black Sea (Artvin, Giresun, Gumushane, Ordu	Turkey	Asia/Pacific	0.853	8	0.826
467	Pelagoniski	North Macedonia	Europe	0.815	2	0.825
468	West Black Sea (Amasya, Cankiri, Corum, Kastamonu	Turkey	Asia/Pacific	0.853	9	0.825
469	St. James, St. George, and St. Thomas	Barbados	America	0.811	1	0.824
470	Gomel region	Belarus	Europe	0.824	2	0.824
471	Kvemo Kartli	Georgia	Asia/Pacific	0.844	5	0.824
472	Semnan	Iran	Asia/Pacific	0.799	3	0.824
473	Yazd	Iran	Asia/Pacific	0.799	4	0.824
474	South and East Serbia	Serbia	Europe	0.833	3	0.824
475	Zhejiang	China	Asia/Pacific	0.797	5	0.823
476	Guangdong	China	Asia/Pacific	0.797	6	0.823
477	Mazandaran	Iran	Asia/Pacific	0.799	5	0.823
478	East region (East-Kazakhstanskaya)	Kazakhstan	Asia/Pacific	0.837	5	0.823
479	Perak	Malaysia	Asia/Pacific	0.819	7	0.823
480	Sud-Vest Oltenia	Romania	Europe	0.845	5	0.823
481	Tashkent	Uzbekistan	Asia/Pacific	0.74	1	0.823
482	Baku	Azerbaijan	Asia/Pacific	0.789	1	0.822
483	Severoiztochen	Bulgaria	Europe	0.845	2	0.822
484	Port Said	Egypt	Africa	0.754	1	0.822
485	Sumadija and West Serbia	Serbia	Europe	0.833	4	0.822
486	Grodno region	Belarus	Europe	0.824	3	0.821
487	Los Lagos (incl Los Rios)	Chile	America	0.878	11	0.821
488	South region (Almatinskaya, Zhambylskaya, Kyzylordinskaya, South-Kazakhstanskaya)	Kazakhstan	Asia/Pacific	0.837	6	0.821
489	Guanacaste	Costa Rica	America	0.833	5	0.82
490	Shida Kartli	Georgia	Asia/Pacific	0.844	6	0.82
491	Ashgabat City	Turkmenistan	Asia/Pacific	0.764	1	0.82
492	Litoral Norte (Paysandu, Salto and Rio Negro)	Uruguay	America	0.862	7	0.82
493	Central	Trinidad and Tobago	America	0.807	1	0.819
494	Vlore	Albania	Europe	0.81	2	0.818
495	Kotayk	Armenia	Asia/Pacific	0.811	2	0.818
496	Christ Church and St. Philip	Barbados	America	0.811	2	0.818
497	Durres	Albania	Europe	0.81	3	0.817
498	Yuzhen tsentralen	Bulgaria	Europe	0.845	3	0.817
499	Maule	Chile	America	0.878	12	0.817
500	South West	North Macedonia	Europe	0.815	3	0.817
501	Brest region	Belarus	Europe	0.824	4	0.816
502	Vitebsk region	Belarus	Europe	0.824	5	0.816
503	County of Virovitica-Podravina	Croatia	Europe	0.889	21	0.816
504	Samtskhe-Javakheti	Georgia	Asia/Pacific	0.844	7	0.816
505	Kedah	Malaysia	Asia/Pacific	0.819	8	0.816
506	Rio de Janeiro	Brazil	America	0.786	2	0.815
507	Qom	Iran	Asia/Pacific	0.799	6	0.815
508	South (Grand Port, Savanne, Plaines Wilhems, Black River)	Mauritius	Africa	0.806	1	0.815
509	South (Tacna, Moquegua, Arequipa, Ica, Ayacucho)	Peru	America	0.794	2	0.815
510	Mogilev region	Belarus	Europe	0.824	6	0.814
511	Ilam	Iran	Asia/Pacific	0.799	7	0.814
512	Nuevo Leon	Mexico	America	0.789	2	0.814
513	Severen tsentralen	Bulgaria	Europe	0.845	4	0.813
514	Araucania	Chile	America	0.878	13	0.813
515	Perlis	Malaysia	Asia/Pacific	0.819	9	0.813
516	Baja California	Mexico	America	0.789	3	0.813
517	Sud-Est	Romania	Europe	0.845	6	0.813
518	South-East	Botswana	Africa	0.731	1	0.812
519	Sao Paulo	Brazil	America	0.786	3	0.812
520	Fujian	China	Asia/Pacific	0.797	7	0.812
521	Valle (incl Cali)	Colombia	America	0.788	2	0.812
522	Puntarenas	Costa Rica	America	0.833	6	0.812
523	Bushehr	Iran	Asia/Pacific	0.799	8	0.812
524	Pahang	Malaysia	Asia/Pacific	0.819	10	0.812
525	Cocle	Panama	America	0.839	6	0.812
526	San Andres	Colombia	America	0.788	3	0.811
527	Sonora	Mexico	America	0.789	4	0.811
528	Gjirokaster	Albania	Europe	0.81	4	0.81
529	Yugoiztochen	Bulgaria	Europe	0.845	5	0.81
530	Baja California Sur	Mexico	America	0.789	5	0.81
531	Vardarski	North Macedonia	Europe	0.815	4	0.81
532	Fars	Iran	Asia/Pacific	0.799	9	0.809
533	North West	Trinidad and Tobago	America	0.807	2	0.809
534	Red River Delta	Vietnam	Asia/Pacific	0.766	1	0.809
535	Shirak	Armenia	Asia/Pacific	0.811	3	0.808
536	Atlantico (incl Barranquilla)	Colombia	America	0.788	4	0.808
537	Suez	Egypt	Africa	0.754	2	0.808
538	Sinaloa	Mexico	America	0.789	6	0.808
539	Central	Thailand	Asia/Pacific	0.798	2	0.808
540	Vayots Dzor	Armenia	Asia/Pacific	0.811	4	0.807
541	Absheron	Azerbaijan	Asia/Pacific	0.789	2	0.807
542	Inner Mongolia	China	Asia/Pacific	0.797	8	0.807
543	Samegrelo-Zemo Svateni	Georgia	Asia/Pacific	0.844	8	0.807
544	Terengganu	Malaysia	Asia/Pacific	0.819	11	0.807
545	Poloski	North Macedonia	Europe	0.815	5	0.807
546	North East Anatolia (Agri, Erzincan, Erzurum, Kars	Turkey	Asia/Pacific	0.853	10	0.807
547	Korce	Albania	Europe	0.81	5	0.806
548	Central Bosnia	Bosnia and Herzegovina	Europe	0.804	2	0.806
549	Syunik	Armenia	Asia/Pacific	0.811	5	0.805
550	Quindio	Colombia	America	0.788	5	0.805
551	Alexandria	Egypt	Africa	0.754	3	0.805
552	Tobago	Trinidad and Tobago	America	0.807	3	0.805
553	St Michael	Barbados	America	0.811	3	0.804
554	Chongqing	China	Asia/Pacific	0.797	9	0.804
555	Male	Maldives	Asia/Pacific	0.766	1	0.804
556	South East Anatolia (Adiyaman, Diyarbakir, Gaziant	Turkey	Asia/Pacific	0.853	11	0.804
557	St. Lucy, St. Peter, St. Andrew, St. Joseph, and St. John	Barbados	America	0.811	4	0.803
558	Liaoning	China	Asia/Pacific	0.797	10	0.803
559	Hubei	China	Asia/Pacific	0.797	11	0.803
560	Cairo	Egypt	Africa	0.754	4	0.803
561	Upper Demerara-Berbice	Guyana	America	0.776	1	0.803
562	Gilan	Iran	Asia/Pacific	0.799	10	0.803
563	Sud	Romania	Europe	0.845	7	0.803
564	South West	Trinidad and Tobago	America	0.807	4	0.803
565	Shaanxi	China	Asia/Pacific	0.797	12	0.802
566	Khuzestan	Iran	Asia/Pacific	0.799	11	0.802
567	Nord-Est	Romania	Europe	0.845	8	0.802
568	Central East Anatolia (Bingol, Bitlis, Elazig, Hak	Turkey	Asia/Pacific	0.853	12	0.802
569	Republica Srpska	Bosnia and Herzegovina	Europe	0.804	3	0.801
570	Rio Grande do Sul	Brazil	America	0.786	4	0.801
571	Goa	India	Asia/Pacific	0.685	1	0.801
572	Coahuila	Mexico	America	0.789	7	0.801
573	Elbasan	Albania	Europe	0.81	6	0.8
574	Santa Catarina	Brazil	America	0.786	5	0.8
575	Shanxi	China	Asia/Pacific	0.797	13	0.8
576	C. Habana	Cuba	America	0.762	1	0.8
577	Guria	Georgia	Asia/Pacific	0.844	9	0.8
578	Kakheti	Georgia	Asia/Pacific	0.844	10	0.8
579	North (Port Louis, Pamplemousses, Riviere du Rempart, Flacq, Moka)	Mauritius	Africa	0.806	2	0.8
High human development
580	Shkoder	Albania	Europe	0.81	7	0.799
581	Santander	Colombia	America	0.788	6	0.799
582	French Guyana	France	Europe	0.92	26	0.799
583	Kerala	India	Asia/Pacific	0.685	2	0.799
584	Tavush	Armenia	Asia/Pacific	0.811	6	0.798
585	Western Bosnia	Bosnia and Herzegovina	Europe	0.804	4	0.798
586	Shandong	China	Asia/Pacific	0.797	14	0.798
587	Caldas	Colombia	America	0.788	7	0.798
588	Meta	Colombia	America	0.788	8	0.798
589	Berat	Albania	Europe	0.81	8	0.797
590	Northern Bosnia	Bosnia and Herzegovina	Europe	0.804	5	0.797
591	Aguascalientes	Mexico	America	0.789	8	0.797
592	Demerara-Mahaica	Guyana	America	0.776	2	0.796
593	Kermanshah	Iran	Asia/Pacific	0.799	12	0.796
594	Chihuahua	Mexico	America	0.789	9	0.796
595	Aragatsotn	Armenia	Asia/Pacific	0.811	7	0.795
596	Parana	Brazil	America	0.786	6	0.795
597	Chaharmahal and Bakhtiyari	Iran	Asia/Pacific	0.799	13	0.795
598	Qazvin	Iran	Asia/Pacific	0.799	14	0.795
599	Labuan Federal Territory	Malaysia	Asia/Pacific	0.819	12	0.795
600	Tamaulipas	Mexico	America	0.789	10	0.795
601	Cundinamarca	Colombia	America	0.788	9	0.794
602	Jalisco	Mexico	America	0.789	11	0.794
603	Antioquia (incl Medellin)	Colombia	America	0.788	10	0.793
604	Limon	Costa Rica	America	0.833	7	0.793
605	Region 0 (Distrito Nacional, Santo Domingo, Monte Plata)	Dominican Republic	America	0.776	1	0.793
606	Chandigarth	India	Asia/Pacific	0.685	3	0.793
607	East	North Macedonia	Europe	0.815	6	0.793
608	Central (Asuncion, Central)	Paraguay	America	0.756	1	0.793
609	Goias	Brazil	America	0.786	7	0.792
610	Markazi	Iran	Asia/Pacific	0.799	15	0.792
611	Kohgiluyeh and Boyerahmad	Iran	Asia/Pacific	0.799	16	0.792
612	Queretaro	Mexico	America	0.789	12	0.792
613	North East	North Macedonia	Europe	0.815	7	0.792
614	Santa Cruz	Bolivia	America	0.733	1	0.791
615	Lori	Armenia	Asia/Pacific	0.811	8	0.79
616	Hunan	China	Asia/Pacific	0.797	15	0.79
617	Hainan	China	Asia/Pacific	0.797	16	0.79
618	Sierra	Ecuador	America	0.777	1	0.79
619	Grand Tunis (Tunis, Ariana, Ben Arous, Manouba)	Tunisia	Africa	0.746	1	0.79
620	Ararat	Armenia	Asia/Pacific	0.811	9	0.789
621	Mayotte	France	Europe	0.92	27	0.789
622	Colima	Mexico	America	0.789	13	0.789
623	Mexico	Mexico	America	0.789	14	0.789
624	Quintana Roo	Mexico	America	0.789	15	0.789
625	The Privolzhsky (Volga) Federal District	Russia	Europe	0.832	4	0.789
626	Espirito Santo	Brazil	America	0.786	8	0.788
627	Mato Grosso do Sul	Brazil	America	0.786	9	0.788
628	Roraima	Brazil	America	0.786	10	0.787
629	Jilin	China	Asia/Pacific	0.797	17	0.787
630	East	Trinidad and Tobago	America	0.807	5	0.787
631	Severozapaden	Bulgaria	Europe	0.845	6	0.786
632	EastAzarbayejan	Iran	Asia/Pacific	0.799	17	0.786
633	Kelantan	Malaysia	Asia/Pacific	0.819	13	0.786
634	Ulaanbaatar	Mongolia	Asia/Pacific	0.747	1	0.786
635	South	Thailand	Asia/Pacific	0.798	3	0.786
636	Minas Gerais	Brazil	America	0.786	11	0.785
637	East	Ukraine	Europe	0.779	1	0.785
638	Lezhe	Albania	Europe	0.81	9	0.784
639	Nord Centre (Alger, Blida, Boumerdes, Tipaza, Bouira, Medea, Tizi-Ouzou, Bejaia, Chlef, Ain Defla)	Algeria	Africa	0.763	1	0.784
640	South	Ukraine	Europe	0.779	2	0.784
641	Fier	Albania	Europe	0.81	10	0.783
642	Ganja Gazakh	Azerbaijan	Asia/Pacific	0.789	3	0.783
643	Shaki Zaqatala	Azerbaijan	Asia/Pacific	0.789	4	0.783
644	DKI Jakarta	Indonesia	Asia/Pacific	0.728	1	0.783
645	Mato Grosso	Brazil	America	0.786	12	0.782
646	Isla	Cuba	America	0.762	2	0.782
647	Puducherry	India	Asia/Pacific	0.685	4	0.782
648	Khorasan-e-Razavi	Iran	Asia/Pacific	0.799	18	0.782
649	Morelos	Mexico	America	0.789	16	0.782
650	North	Thailand	Asia/Pacific	0.798	4	0.782
651	Risaralda	Colombia	America	0.788	11	0.781
652	Lorestan	Iran	Asia/Pacific	0.799	19	0.781
653	South East	North Macedonia	Europe	0.815	8	0.781
654	North	Ukraine	Europe	0.779	3	0.781
655	Boyaca	Colombia	America	0.788	12	0.78
656	Beqaa	Lebanon	Asia/Pacific	0.752	1	0.78
657	South	Moldova	Europe	0.785	2	0.78
658	The Far East Federal District	Russia	Europe	0.832	5	0.78
659	Armavir	Armenia	Asia/Pacific	0.811	10	0.779
660	Nakhchivan	Azerbaijan	Asia/Pacific	0.789	5	0.779
661	Damietta	Egypt	Africa	0.754	5	0.779
662	DI Yogyakarta	Indonesia	Asia/Pacific	0.728	2	0.779
663	Kerman	Iran	Asia/Pacific	0.799	20	0.779
664	The Siberian Federal District	Russia	Europe	0.832	6	0.779
665	Northeast	Thailand	Asia/Pacific	0.798	5	0.779
666	Heilongjiang	China	Asia/Pacific	0.797	18	0.778
667	Campeche	Mexico	America	0.789	17	0.778
668	Tabasco	Mexico	America	0.789	18	0.778
669	Veraguas	Panama	America	0.839	7	0.778
670	Western Cape	South Africa	Africa	0.741	1	0.778
671	Tongatapu	Tonga	Asia/Pacific	0.769	1	0.778
672	South East	Vietnam	Asia/Pacific	0.766	2	0.778
673	Jiangxi	China	Asia/Pacific	0.797	19	0.777
674	Bolivar (Sur and Norte)	Colombia	America	0.788	13	0.777
675	New Delhi	India	Asia/Pacific	0.685	5	0.777
676	Anhui	China	Asia/Pacific	0.797	20	0.776
677	Guaviare	Colombia	America	0.788	14	0.776
678	Golestan	Iran	Asia/Pacific	0.799	21	0.776
679	The South Federal District	Russia	Europe	0.832	7	0.776
680	Rio Grande do Norte	Brazil	America	0.786	13	0.775
681	Vichada	Colombia	America	0.788	15	0.775
682	Coste	Ecuador	America	0.777	2	0.775
683	Nayarit	Mexico	America	0.789	19	0.775
684	Balkan	Turkmenistan	Asia/Pacific	0.764	2	0.775
685	Tocantins	Brazil	America	0.786	14	0.774
686	Region VIII (La Vega, Monsenor Nouel, Sanchez Ramirez)	Dominican Republic	America	0.776	2	0.774
687	Menoufia	Egypt	Africa	0.754	6	0.774
688	Hamedan	Iran	Asia/Pacific	0.799	22	0.774
689	North Central Coast and South Central Coast	Vietnam	Asia/Pacific	0.766	3	0.774
690	Gegharkunik	Armenia	Asia/Pacific	0.811	11	0.773
691	Amapa	Brazil	America	0.786	15	0.773
692	Ningxia	China	Asia/Pacific	0.797	21	0.773
693	Yucatan	Mexico	America	0.789	20	0.773
694	Zanjan	Iran	Asia/Pacific	0.799	23	0.772
695	Zacatecas	Mexico	America	0.789	21	0.772
696	Sergipe	Brazil	America	0.786	16	0.771
697	Hebei	China	Asia/Pacific	0.797	22	0.771
698	Sichuan	China	Asia/Pacific	0.797	23	0.771
699	Xinjiang	China	Asia/Pacific	0.797	24	0.771
700	Cienfuegos	Cuba	America	0.762	3	0.771
701	Region I (Peravia, San Cristobal, San Jose de Ocoa, Azua)	Dominican Republic	America	0.776	3	0.771
702	Region III (Duarte, Maria Trinidad Sanchez, Salcedo, Samana)	Dominican Republic	America	0.776	4	0.771
703	Dakahlia	Egypt	Africa	0.754	7	0.771
704	Apia Urban Area	Samoa	Asia/Pacific	0.708	1	0.771
705	Central	Ukraine	Europe	0.779	4	0.771
706	Norte de Santander	Colombia	America	0.788	16	0.77
707	Casanare	Colombia	America	0.788	17	0.77
708	Prov. Habana	Cuba	America	0.762	4	0.77
709	Ismailia	Egypt	Africa	0.754	8	0.77
710	Mahaica-Berbice	Guyana	America	0.776	3	0.77
711	Lebap	Turkmenistan	Asia/Pacific	0.764	3	0.77
712	Diber	Albania	Europe	0.81	11	0.769
713	Henan	China	Asia/Pacific	0.797	25	0.769
714	Guantanamo	Cuba	America	0.762	5	0.769
715	Region II (Espaillat, Puerto Plata, Santiago)	Dominican Republic	America	0.776	5	0.769
716	Essequibo Islands-West Demerara	Guyana	America	0.776	4	0.769
717	Hormozgan	Iran	Asia/Pacific	0.799	24	0.769
718	Southern, Nabtieh	Lebanon	Asia/Pacific	0.752	2	0.769
719	Durango	Mexico	America	0.789	22	0.769
720	Tlaxcala	Mexico	America	0.789	23	0.769
721	Bocas del Toro	Panama	America	0.839	8	0.768
722	Paro	Bhutan	Asia/Pacific	0.698	2	0.767
723	Tolima	Colombia	America	0.788	18	0.767
724	Ciego de Avila	Cuba	America	0.762	6	0.767
725	Santiago de Cuba	Cuba	America	0.762	7	0.767
726	Gharbia	Egypt	Africa	0.754	9	0.767
727	East Berbice-Corentyne	Guyana	America	0.776	5	0.767
728	Hidalgo	Mexico	America	0.789	24	0.766
729	West	Ukraine	Europe	0.779	5	0.766
730	Kukes	Albania	Europe	0.81	12	0.765
731	Aran	Azerbaijan	Asia/Pacific	0.789	6	0.765
732	Amman	Jordan	Asia/Pacific	0.754	1	0.765
733	The North-Caucasian Federal District	Russia	Europe	0.832	8	0.765
734	Sucre	Colombia	America	0.788	19	0.764
735	North	Moldova	Europe	0.785	3	0.764
736	Region IV (Independencia, Bahoruco, Barahona, Pedernales)	Dominican Republic	America	0.776	6	0.763
737	Ardebil	Iran	Asia/Pacific	0.799	25	0.763
738	Gauteng	South Africa	Africa	0.741	2	0.763
739	Amazonas	Brazil	America	0.786	17	0.762
740	North (Tumbes, Piura, Lambayeque, Cajamarca, La Libertad)	Peru	America	0.794	3	0.762
741	Dakhlik Shirvan	Azerbaijan	Asia/Pacific	0.789	7	0.761
742	Pernambuco	Brazil	America	0.786	18	0.761
743	Arauca	Colombia	America	0.788	20	0.761
744	Frontier governorates (Red Sea, New Valley, Matroh, North Sainai, South Sainai)	Egypt	Africa	0.754	10	0.761
745	Annobon, Bioko	Equatorial Guinea	Africa	0.674	1	0.761
746	Guanajuato	Mexico	America	0.789	25	0.761
747	San Luis Potosi	Mexico	America	0.789	26	0.761
748	Nord Est (Annaba, Constantine, Skikda, Jijel, Mila, Souk Ahras, El Tarf, Guelma)	Algeria	Africa	0.763	2	0.76
749	Paraiba	Brazil	America	0.786	19	0.76
750	Bahia	Brazil	America	0.786	20	0.76
751	Guangxi	China	Asia/Pacific	0.797	26	0.76
752	Region V (El Seibo, La Altagracia, La Romana, San Pedro de Macoris, Hato Mayor)	Dominican Republic	America	0.776	7	0.76
753	Jammu and Kashmir	India	Asia/Pacific	0.685	6	0.76
754	WestAzarbayejan	Iran	Asia/Pacific	0.799	26	0.76
755	Balqa	Jordan	Asia/Pacific	0.754	2	0.76
756	Center	Moldova	Europe	0.785	4	0.76
757	Guba Khachmaz	Azerbaijan	Asia/Pacific	0.789	8	0.759
758	Matanzas	Cuba	America	0.762	8	0.759
759	Kalyubia	Egypt	Africa	0.754	11	0.759
760	Metropolitan	Guatemala	America	0.662	1	0.759
761	Central-East (Dzhizak, Syrdarya)	Uzbekistan	Asia/Pacific	0.74	2	0.759
762	Pando	Bolivia	America	0.733	2	0.758
763	Rondonia	Brazil	America	0.786	21	0.758
764	Aljoun	Jordan	Asia/Pacific	0.754	3	0.758
765	Duchanbe	Tajikistan	Asia/Pacific	0.691	1	0.758
766	Akhal	Turkmenistan	Asia/Pacific	0.764	4	0.758
767	Ceara	Brazil	America	0.786	22	0.757
768	Kafr El-Sheikh	Egypt	Africa	0.754	12	0.757
769	Libreville-Port Gentil	Gabon	Africa	0.733	1	0.757
770	Himachal Pradesh	India	Asia/Pacific	0.685	7	0.757
771	South Khorasan	Iran	Asia/Pacific	0.799	27	0.757
772	Bishkek	Kyrgyzstan	Asia/Pacific	0.72	1	0.757
773	Vava-u	Tonga	Asia/Pacific	0.769	2	0.757
774	Lankaran	Azerbaijan	Asia/Pacific	0.789	9	0.756
775	Giza	Egypt	Africa	0.754	13	0.756
776	Pacifico (Chinandega, Leon, Managua, Masaya, Granada, Carazo, Rivas)	Nicaragua	America	0.706	1	0.756
777	Sud (Bechar, Tindouf, Adrar, Ghardaia, Biskra, El Oued, Ouargla, Tamanrasset, Illizi)	Algeria	Africa	0.763	3	0.755
778	Khomas	Namibia	Africa	0.665	1	0.755
779	Nord Ouest (Oran, Tlemcen, Mostaganem, Ain Temouchent, Relizane, Sidi Bel Abbes, Mascara)	Algeria	Africa	0.763	4	0.754
780	Tarija	Bolivia	America	0.733	3	0.754
781	Bali	Indonesia	Asia/Pacific	0.728	3	0.754
782	Hauts Plateaux Est (Setif, Batna, Khenchela, Bordj Bou Arreridj, Oum El Bouaghi, Tebessa)	Algeria	Africa	0.763	5	0.753
783	Belize	Belize	America	0.721	1	0.753
784	Sharkia	Egypt	Africa	0.754	14	0.753
785	Sikkim	India	Asia/Pacific	0.685	8	0.753
786	National Capital Region	Philippines	Asia/Pacific	0.72	1	0.753
787	Federal District	Venezuela	America	0.709	1	0.753
788	Pinar del Rio	Cuba	America	0.762	9	0.752
789	West Sumatra	Indonesia	Asia/Pacific	0.728	4	0.752
790	Sarawak	Malaysia	Asia/Pacific	0.819	14	0.752
791	Cesar	Colombia	America	0.788	21	0.751
792	Mizoram	India	Asia/Pacific	0.685	9	0.751
793	Lakshadweep	India	Asia/Pacific	0.685	10	0.751
794	Tafiela	Jordan	Asia/Pacific	0.754	4	0.751
795	Mount Lebanon	Lebanon	Asia/Pacific	0.752	3	0.751
796	Villa Clara	Cuba	America	0.762	10	0.75
797	Region VII (Dajabon, Monte Cristi, Santiago Rodriguez, Valverde)	Dominican Republic	America	0.776	8	0.75
798	Estuaire	Gabon	Africa	0.733	2	0.75
799	North-East	Botswana	Africa	0.731	2	0.749
800	East Kalimantan	Indonesia	Asia/Pacific	0.728	5	0.749
801	Michoacan de Ocampo	Mexico	America	0.789	27	0.749
802	National Capital District	Papua New Guinea	Asia/Pacific	0.576	1	0.749
803	Central (Huancavelica, Huanuco, Junin, Pasco)	Peru	America	0.794	4	0.749
804	St Lucia rural	Saint Lucia	America	0.748	1	0.749
805	Hauts Plateaux Ouest (Tiaret, Saida, Tissemsilt, Naama, El Bayadh)	Algeria	Africa	0.763	6	0.748
806	Yukhari Karabakh	Azerbaijan	Asia/Pacific	0.789	10	0.748
807	Aswan	Egypt	Africa	0.754	15	0.748
808	Rewa	Fiji	Asia/Pacific	0.731	1	0.748
809	Jarash	Jordan	Asia/Pacific	0.754	5	0.748
810	Cordillera Admin Region	Philippines	Asia/Pacific	0.72	2	0.748
811	Magdalena	Colombia	America	0.788	22	0.747
812	Camaguey	Cuba	America	0.762	11	0.747
813	Kordestan	Iran	Asia/Pacific	0.799	28	0.747
814	North Khorasan	Iran	Asia/Pacific	0.799	29	0.747
815	Naitasiri	Fiji	Asia/Pacific	0.731	2	0.746
816	Andaman and Nicobar Islands	India	Asia/Pacific	0.685	11	0.746
817	Puebla	Mexico	America	0.789	28	0.746
818	Centre	Morocco	Africa	0.71	1	0.746
819	Dili	Timor-Leste	Asia/Pacific	0.634	1	0.746
820	Kgatleng	Botswana	Africa	0.731	3	0.745
821	Huila	Colombia	America	0.788	23	0.745
822	S.Spiritus	Cuba	America	0.762	12	0.745
823	Holguin	Cuba	America	0.762	13	0.745
824	Mary	Turkmenistan	Asia/Pacific	0.764	5	0.745
825	Para	Brazil	America	0.786	23	0.744
826	St Lucia urban	Saint Lucia	America	0.748	2	0.744
827	Centre Est (Sousse, Monastir, Mahdia, Sfax)	Tunisia	Africa	0.746	2	0.744
828	Sud Est (Gabes, Medinine, Tataouine)	Tunisia	Africa	0.746	3	0.744
829	Alagoas	Brazil	America	0.786	24	0.743
830	Region VI (San Juan, Elias Pina)	Dominican Republic	America	0.776	9	0.743
831	Zarqa	Jordan	Asia/Pacific	0.754	6	0.743
832	Karak	Jordan	Asia/Pacific	0.754	7	0.743
833	Maan	Jordan	Asia/Pacific	0.754	8	0.743
834	Veracruz	Mexico	America	0.789	29	0.743
835	South-East (Guaira, Misiones, Paraguari, Neembucu)	Paraguay	America	0.756	2	0.743
836	Eua	Tonga	Asia/Pacific	0.769	3	0.743
837	Haa	Bhutan	Asia/Pacific	0.698	3	0.742
838	Oruro	Bolivia	America	0.733	4	0.742
839	Narino	Colombia	America	0.788	24	0.742
840	North Sulawesi	Indonesia	Asia/Pacific	0.728	6	0.742
841	Aqaba	Jordan	Asia/Pacific	0.754	9	0.742
842	Paramaribo	Suriname	America	0.722	1	0.742
843	Dashoguz	Turkmenistan	Asia/Pacific	0.764	6	0.742
844	Dhaka	Bangladesh	Asia/Pacific	0.685	1	0.741
845	Oriente	Ecuador	America	0.777	3	0.741
846	Riau (incl. Riau islands)	Indonesia	Asia/Pacific	0.728	7	0.741
847	Madaba	Jordan	Asia/Pacific	0.754	10	0.741
848	Northern	Lebanon	Asia/Pacific	0.752	4	0.741
849	Free State	South Africa	Africa	0.741	3	0.741
850	Sud Ouest (Gafsa, Tozeur, Kebili)	Tunisia	Africa	0.746	4	0.741
851	Hauts Plateaux Centre (Djelfa, Laghouat, MSila)	Algeria	Africa	0.763	7	0.74
852	Acre	Brazil	America	0.786	25	0.74
853	Piaui	Brazil	America	0.786	26	0.74
854	Cauca	Colombia	America	0.788	25	0.74
855	Amazonas	Colombia	America	0.788	26	0.74
856	Irbid	Jordan	Asia/Pacific	0.754	11	0.74
857	Miranda	Venezuela	America	0.709	2	0.74
858	Beni	Bolivia	America	0.733	5	0.739
859	Putumayo	Colombia	America	0.788	27	0.739
860	Behera	Egypt	Africa	0.754	16	0.739
861	Bengkulu	Indonesia	Asia/Pacific	0.728	8	0.739
862	South-West (Caazapa, Itapua)	Paraguay	America	0.756	3	0.739
863	Northern Province	South Africa	Africa	0.741	4	0.739
864	West (Karakalpakstan, Khorezm)	Uzbekistan	Asia/Pacific	0.74	3	0.739
865	Las Tunas	Cuba	America	0.762	14	0.738
866	Punjab	India	Asia/Pacific	0.685	12	0.738
867	Chukha	Bhutan	Asia/Pacific	0.698	4	0.737
868	Yunnan	China	Asia/Pacific	0.797	27	0.737
869	Caqueta	Colombia	America	0.788	28	0.737
870	Cordoba	Colombia	America	0.788	29	0.737
871	Haryana	India	Asia/Pacific	0.685	13	0.737
872	South Central	Maldives	Asia/Pacific	0.766	2	0.737
873	Darien	Panama	America	0.839	9	0.737
874	Granma	Cuba	America	0.762	15	0.736
875	Ba	Fiji	Asia/Pacific	0.731	3	0.736
876	Maharashtra	India	Asia/Pacific	0.685	14	0.736
877	Vientiane Municipality	Laos	Asia/Pacific	0.617	1	0.736
878	South	Maldives	Asia/Pacific	0.766	3	0.736
879	Central (Dornogovi, Dundgovi, Umnugovi, Selenge, Tuv, Darkhan-Uul, Govisumber)	Mongolia	Asia/Pacific	0.747	2	0.736
880	Rest of Upolu	Samoa	Asia/Pacific	0.708	2	0.736
881	KwaZulu Natal	South Africa	Africa	0.741	5	0.736
882	La Paz	Bolivia	America	0.733	6	0.735
883	North Sumatra	Indonesia	Asia/Pacific	0.728	9	0.735
884	North-East (Caaguazu, Alto Parana, Canideyu)	Paraguay	America	0.756	4	0.735
885	Guizhou	China	Asia/Pacific	0.797	28	0.734
886	Macuata	Fiji	Asia/Pacific	0.731	4	0.734
887	DI Aceh	Indonesia	Asia/Pacific	0.728	10	0.734
888	North East (Amazonas, Loreto, San Martin, Ucayali)	Peru	America	0.794	5	0.734
889	III-Central Luzon	Philippines	Asia/Pacific	0.72	3	0.734
890	IVA-CALABARZON	Philippines	Asia/Pacific	0.72	4	0.734
891	Aragua	Venezuela	America	0.709	3	0.734
892	Luanda	Angola	Africa	0.616	1	0.733
893	St Ann, St Catherine	Jamaica	America	0.72	1	0.733
894	East (Madre de Dios, Cusco, Puno, Apurimac)	Peru	America	0.794	6	0.733
895	North West Upolu	Samoa	Asia/Pacific	0.708	3	0.733
896	Nord Est (Nabeul, Zaghouan, Bizerte)	Tunisia	Africa	0.746	5	0.733
897	Central (Navoi, Bukhara, Samarkand)	Uzbekistan	Asia/Pacific	0.74	4	0.733
898	Qena	Egypt	Africa	0.754	17	0.732
899	Tamil Nadu	India	Asia/Pacific	0.685	15	0.734
900	North	Maldives	Asia/Pacific	0.766	4	0.732
901	East (Namangan, Fergana, Andizhan)	Uzbekistan	Asia/Pacific	0.74	5	0.732
902	Stann Creek, Toledo	Belize	America	0.721	2	0.731
903	Gansu	China	Asia/Pacific	0.797	29	0.731
904	Pomeroon-Supenaam	Guyana	America	0.776	6	0.73
905	West Java	Indonesia	Asia/Pacific	0.728	11	0.73
906	North west	Morocco	Africa	0.71	2	0.73
907	North-West (Boqueron, Alto Paraguay, Presidente Hayes, Conception, Amambay, San pedro, Cordillera)	Paraguay	America	0.756	5	0.73
908	Sarpang	Bhutan	Asia/Pacific	0.698	5	0.729
909	Maranhao	Brazil	America	0.786	27	0.729
910	Banten	Indonesia	Asia/Pacific	0.728	12	0.729
911	North Central	Maldives	Asia/Pacific	0.766	5	0.729
912	Savaii	Samoa	Asia/Pacific	0.708	4	0.729
913	Carabobo	Venezuela	America	0.709	4	0.729
914	Kingston, St Andrew	Jamaica	America	0.72	2	0.728
915	Northern Cape	South Africa	Africa	0.741	6	0.728
916	Wanica and Para	Suriname	America	0.722	2	0.728
917	Ongo Niua	Tonga	Asia/Pacific	0.769	4	0.728
918	Nueva Esparta	Venezuela	America	0.709	5	0.728
919	Vargas	Venezuela	America	0.709	6	0.728
920	Qinghai	China	Asia/Pacific	0.797	30	0.727
921	II-Cagayan Valley	Philippines	Asia/Pacific	0.72	5	0.727
922	Tailevu	Fiji	Asia/Pacific	0.731	5	0.726
923	Central Java	Indonesia	Asia/Pacific	0.728	13	0.726
924	East Java	Indonesia	Asia/Pacific	0.728	14	0.726
925	Tripolitania	Libya	Africa	0.721	1	0.726
926	Manipur	India	Asia/Pacific	0.685	16	0.725
927	Chuy	Kyrgyzstan	Asia/Pacific	0.72	2	0.725
928	Ha-apai	Tonga	Asia/Pacific	0.769	5	0.725
929	North East, North West	Vietnam	Asia/Pacific	0.766	4	0.724
930	Mekong River Delta	Vietnam	Asia/Pacific	0.766	5	0.724
931	Cochabamba	Bolivia	America	0.733	7	0.723
932	Fayoum	Egypt	Africa	0.754	18	0.723
933	Rodrigues	Mauritius	Africa	0.806	3	0.723
934	Lagos	Nigeria	Africa	0.56	1	0.723
935	VI-Western Visayas	Philippines	Asia/Pacific	0.72	6	0.723
936	Central Highlands	Vietnam	Asia/Pacific	0.766	6	0.723
937	Cuyuni-Mazaruni	Guyana	America	0.776	7	0.722
938	Arunachal Pradesh	India	Asia/Pacific	0.685	17	0.722
939	Uttaranchal	India	Asia/Pacific	0.685	18	0.722
940	Jambi	Indonesia	Asia/Pacific	0.728	15	0.722
941	South Sulawesi (incl Sulawesi Barat)	Indonesia	Asia/Pacific	0.728	16	0.722
942	Central	Maldives	Asia/Pacific	0.766	6	0.722
943	South	Morocco	Africa	0.71	3	0.722
944	Nord Ouest (Beja, Jendouba, Kef, Siliana)	Tunisia	Africa	0.746	6	0.722
945	South Sumatra	Indonesia	Asia/Pacific	0.728	17	0.721
946	Southeast Sulawesi	Indonesia	Asia/Pacific	0.728	18	0.721
947	Beirut	Lebanon	Asia/Pacific	0.752	5	0.721
948	X-Northern Mindanao	Philippines	Asia/Pacific	0.72	7	0.721
949	Guajira	Colombia	America	0.788	30	0.72
950	Beni Suef	Egypt	Africa	0.754	19	0.72
951	Nagaland	India	Asia/Pacific	0.685	19	0.72
952	Fezzan	Libya	Africa	0.721	2	0.72
953	Tiris-Zemmour	Mauritania	Africa	0.563	1	0.72
954	I-Ilocos	Philippines	Asia/Pacific	0.72	8	0.72
955	Serua, Namosi	Fiji	Asia/Pacific	0.731	6	0.719
956	Upper Takutu-Upper Essequibo	Guyana	America	0.776	8	0.719
957	Issyk-Kul	Kyrgyzstan	Asia/Pacific	0.72	3	0.719
958	XIII-Caraga	Philippines	Asia/Pacific	0.72	9	0.719
959	Anzoategui	Venezuela	America	0.709	7	0.719
960	Bagerhat, Khulna, Satkhira	Bangladesh	Asia/Pacific	0.685	2	0.718
961	Choco	Colombia	America	0.788	31	0.718
962	Lampung	Indonesia	Asia/Pacific	0.728	19	0.718
963	Sabah	Malaysia	Asia/Pacific	0.819	15	0.718
964	Maluku	Indonesia	Asia/Pacific	0.728	20	0.717
965	Centre north	Morocco	Africa	0.71	4	0.717
966	Erongo	Namibia	Africa	0.665	2	0.717
967	XI-Davao	Philippines	Asia/Pacific	0.72	10	0.717
968	Nickerie, Coronie and Saramacca	Suriname	America	0.722	3	0.717
969	Central I	El Salvador	America	0.678	1	0.716
970	Bangka Belitung	Indonesia	Asia/Pacific	0.728	21	0.716
971	Manchester, Clarendon	Jamaica	America	0.72	3	0.716
972	Kweneng	Botswana	Africa	0.731	4	0.715
973	Suleimaniya	Iraq	Asia/Pacific	0.695	1	0.715
974	Southern	Botswana	Africa	0.731	5	0.714
975	South Kalimantan	Indonesia	Asia/Pacific	0.728	22	0.714
976	Ta-amem-Karkuk	Iraq	Asia/Pacific	0.695	2	0.714
977	Menya	Egypt	Africa	0.754	20	0.713
978	Karnataka	India	Asia/Pacific	0.685	20	0.713
979	Daman and Diu	India	Asia/Pacific	0.685	21	0.713
980	West Nusa Tenggara	Indonesia	Asia/Pacific	0.728	23	0.713
981	Erbil	Iraq	Asia/Pacific	0.695	3	0.712
982	St James, Hanover, Westmoreland	Jamaica	America	0.72	4	0.712
983	Cyrenaica	Libya	Africa	0.721	3	0.712
984	Bolivar	Venezuela	America	0.709	8	0.712
985	Cabinda	Angola	Africa	0.616	2	0.711
986	Hhohho	Eswatini	Africa	0.695	1	0.711
987	Dohouk	Iraq	Asia/Pacific	0.695	4	0.711
988	Guerrero	Mexico	America	0.789	30	0.711
989	Oaxaca	Mexico	America	0.789	31	0.711
990	Funafuti	Tuvalu	Asia/Pacific	0.689	1	0.711
991	Central Sulawesi	Indonesia	Asia/Pacific	0.728	24	0.71
992	Baghdad	Iraq	Asia/Pacific	0.695	5	0.71
993	Ebonyi	Nigeria	Africa	0.56	2	0.71
994	South (Kashkadarya, Surkhandarya)	Uzbekistan	Asia/Pacific	0.74	6	0.71
995	Souhag	Egypt	Africa	0.754	21	0.709
996	St Thomas, Portland, St Mary	Jamaica	America	0.72	5	0.709
997	Central	Botswana	Africa	0.731	6	0.708
998	Chobe	Botswana	Africa	0.731	7	0.708
999	Nadroga or Navosa	Fiji	Asia/Pacific	0.731	7	0.708
1000	Haut Ogooue	Gabon	Africa	0.733	3	0.708
1001	Mafraq	Jordan	Asia/Pacific	0.754	12	0.708
1002	Mpumalanga	South Africa	Africa	0.741	7	0.708
1003	Central Kalimantan	Indonesia	Asia/Pacific	0.728	25	0.706
1004	VIII-Eastern Visayas	Philippines	Asia/Pacific	0.72	11	0.706
1005	Tachira	Venezuela	America	0.709	9	0.706
1006	Brazzaville	Congo	Africa	0.649	1	0.705
1007	North West	South Africa	Africa	0.741	8	0.705
1008	Bumthang	Bhutan	Asia/Pacific	0.698	6	0.704
1009	Chuquisaca	Bolivia	America	0.733	8	0.704
1010	Diala	Iraq	Asia/Pacific	0.695	6	0.704
1011	Eastern (Dornod, Sukhbaatar, Khentii)	Mongolia	Asia/Pacific	0.747	3	0.704
1012	IVB-MIMAROPA	Philippines	Asia/Pacific	0.72	12	0.704
1013	VII-Central Visayas	Philippines	Asia/Pacific	0.72	13	0.704
1014	Commewijne and Marowijne	Suriname	America	0.722	4	0.704
1015	Jessore, Magura, Narail	Bangladesh	Asia/Pacific	0.685	3	0.703
1016	Santiago- Praia	Cape Verde	Africa	0.668	1	0.703
1017	Francisco Morazan	Honduras	America	0.645	1	0.703
1018	Nenava	Iraq	Asia/Pacific	0.695	7	0.703
1019	Naryn	Kyrgyzstan	Asia/Pacific	0.72	4	0.703
1020	Eastern Cape	South Africa	Africa	0.741	9	0.703
1021	Barisal, Jhalokati, Pirojpur	Bangladesh	Asia/Pacific	0.685	4	0.702
1022	Phnom Penh	Cambodia	Asia/Pacific	0.606	1	0.702
1023	Littoral (incl Douala)	Cameroon	Africa	0.588	1	0.702
1024	Gazipur, Narayanganj, Narsingdi	Bangladesh	Asia/Pacific	0.685	5	0.701
1025	Litoral	Equatorial Guinea	Africa	0.674	2	0.701
1026	West Kalimantan	Indonesia	Asia/Pacific	0.728	26	0.701
1027	Trelawny, St Elizabeth	Jamaica	America	0.72	6	0.701
1028	Naogaon, Nawabganj, Rajshahi	Bangladesh	Asia/Pacific	0.685	6	0.7
1029	Salaheldeen	Iraq	Asia/Pacific	0.695	8	0.7
1030	Nouadhibou	Mauritania	Africa	0.563	2	0.7
1031	GBAO	Tajikistan	Asia/Pacific	0.691	2	0.7
1032	Monagas	Venezuela	America	0.709	10	0.7
Medium human development
1033	Kgalagadi	Botswana	Africa	0.731	8	0.699
1034	Assuit	Egypt	Africa	0.754	22	0.699
1035	Ogooue Maritime	Gabon	Africa	0.733	4	0.699
1036	Telangana	India	Asia/Pacific	0.685	22	0.699
1037	Batken	Kyrgyzstan	Asia/Pacific	0.72	5	0.699
1038	Chiapas	Mexico	America	0.789	32	0.699
1039	Karas	Namibia	Africa	0.665	3	0.699
1040	Potaro-Siparuni	Guyana	America	0.776	9	0.698
1041	Osh	Kyrgyzstan	Asia/Pacific	0.72	6	0.698
1042	Falcon	Venezuela	America	0.709	11	0.698
1043	Merida	Venezuela	America	0.709	12	0.698
1044	Punakha	Bhutan	Asia/Pacific	0.698	7	0.697
1045	Greater Accra	Ghana	Africa	0.628	1	0.697
1046	Talas	Kyrgyzstan	Asia/Pacific	0.72	7	0.697
1047	Kampala	Uganda	Africa	0.582	1	0.697
1048	Bulawayo	Zimbabwe	Africa	0.598	1	0.697
1049	Natore, Pabna, Sirajganj	Bangladesh	Asia/Pacific	0.685	7	0.696
1050	North-West, Ngamiland	Botswana	Africa	0.731	9	0.696
1051	Addis	Ethiopia	Africa	0.497	1	0.696
1052	Jalal-Abad	Kyrgyzstan	Asia/Pacific	0.72	8	0.696
1053	Port Vila	Vanuatu	Asia/Pacific	0.621	1	0.696
1054	Chittagong	Bangladesh	Asia/Pacific	0.685	8	0.695
1055	Barima-Waini	Guyana	America	0.776	10	0.695
1056	Yangon	Myanmar	Asia/Pacific	0.609	1	0.695
1057	Sughd (formerly Leninabad)	Tajikistan	Asia/Pacific	0.691	3	0.695
1058	Zulia	Venezuela	America	0.709	13	0.695
1059	Chuadanga, Jhenaidah, Kushtia, Meherpur	Bangladesh	Asia/Pacific	0.685	9	0.694
1060	Kadavu, Lau, Lomaiviti, Rotuma	Fiji	Asia/Pacific	0.731	8	0.694
1061	Ra	Fiji	Asia/Pacific	0.731	9	0.694
1062	Nairobi	Kenya	Africa	0.628	1	0.694
1063	XII-SOCCSKSARGEN	Philippines	Asia/Pacific	0.72	14	0.694
1064	Cakaudrove, Bua	Fiji	Asia/Pacific	0.731	10	0.693
1065	Woleu Ntem	Gabon	Africa	0.733	5	0.693
1066	Thi-Qar	Iraq	Asia/Pacific	0.695	9	0.693
1067	Tensift	Morocco	Africa	0.71	5	0.693
1068	Amacuros Delta Federal Territory	Venezuela	America	0.709	14	0.693
1069	Corozal, Orange Walk	Belize	America	0.721	3	0.692
1070	S.Vicente	Cape Verde	Africa	0.668	2	0.692
1071	Pointe Noire	Congo	Africa	0.649	2	0.692
1072	Rajasthan	India	Asia/Pacific	0.685	23	0.692
1073	Khangai (Arkhangai, Bayankhongor, Bulgan, Uvurkhangai, Khuvsgul, Orkhon)	Mongolia	Asia/Pacific	0.747	4	0.692
1074	Amazonas Federal Territory	Venezuela	America	0.709	15	0.692
1075	Moyen Ogooue	Gabon	Africa	0.733	6	0.691
1076	Tulkarm	Palestine	Asia/Pacific	0.674	1	0.691
1077	Guainja	Colombia	America	0.788	32	0.69
1078	Lubombo	Eswatini	Africa	0.695	2	0.69
1079	Meghalaya	India	Asia/Pacific	0.685	24	0.69
1080	Imo	Nigeria	Africa	0.56	3	0.69
1081	Salfit	Palestine	Asia/Pacific	0.674	2	0.69
1082	V-Bicol	Philippines	Asia/Pacific	0.72	15	0.69
1083	Conakry	Guinea	Africa	0.5	1	0.689
1084	Gorontalo	Indonesia	Asia/Pacific	0.728	27	0.689
1085	Anbar	Iraq	Asia/Pacific	0.695	10	0.689
1086	Babylon	Iraq	Asia/Pacific	0.695	11	0.689
1087	Bethlehem	Palestine	Asia/Pacific	0.674	3	0.689
1088	Lara	Venezuela	America	0.709	16	0.689
1089	Shiselweni	Eswatini	Africa	0.695	3	0.688
1090	Sistanand Baluchestan	Iran	Asia/Pacific	0.799	30	0.688
1091	Qadisiya	Iraq	Asia/Pacific	0.695	12	0.688
1092	Cortes	Honduras	America	0.645	2	0.687
1093	Ramallah & Al-Bireh	Palestine	Asia/Pacific	0.674	4	0.686
1094	Cojedes	Venezuela	America	0.709	17	0.686
1095	Gopalganj, Madaripur, Munshiganj, Shariatpur	Bangladesh	Asia/Pacific	0.685	10	0.685
1096	Manzini	Eswatini	Africa	0.695	4	0.685
1097	Gujarat	India	Asia/Pacific	0.685	25	0.685
1098	Maekel	Eritrea	Africa	0.503	1	0.684
1099	IX-Zamboanga Peninsula	Philippines	Asia/Pacific	0.72	16	0.684
1100	DRS	Tajikistan	Asia/Pacific	0.691	4	0.684
1101	Oshana	Namibia	Africa	0.665	4	0.683
1102	Abuja FCT	Nigeria	Africa	0.56	4	0.683
1103	Jenin	Palestine	Asia/Pacific	0.674	5	0.683
1104	Centre Ouest (Kairouan, Kasserine, Sidi Bouzid)	Tunisia	Africa	0.746	7	0.683
1105	Western (Bayan-Ulgii, Govi-Altai, Zavkhan, Uvs, Khovd)	Mongolia	Asia/Pacific	0.747	5	0.682
1106	Ghanzi	Botswana	Africa	0.731	10	0.681
1107	Andhra Pradesh	India	Asia/Pacific	0.685	26	0.681
1108	Hardap	Namibia	Africa	0.665	5	0.681
1109	Qalqiliya	Palestine	Asia/Pacific	0.674	6	0.68
1110	Anambra	Nigeria	Africa	0.56	5	0.679
1111	Nablus	Palestine	Asia/Pacific	0.674	7	0.679
1112	Jerusalem	Palestine	Asia/Pacific	0.674	8	0.679
1113	Sucre	Venezuela	America	0.709	18	0.679
1114	Faridpur, Manikganj, Rajbari	Bangladesh	Asia/Pacific	0.685	11	0.678
1115	Bagmati province	Nepal	Asia/Pacific	0.622	1	0.678
1116	Trujillo	Venezuela	America	0.709	19	0.678
1117	Jamalpur, Sherpur, Tangail	Bangladesh	Asia/Pacific	0.685	12	0.677
1118	Barguna, Bhola, Patuakhali	Bangladesh	Asia/Pacific	0.685	13	0.676
1119	Sud Ouest	Cameroon	Africa	0.588	2	0.676
1120	Islas de la Bahia	Honduras	America	0.645	3	0.676
1121	Kerbela	Iraq	Asia/Pacific	0.695	13	0.676
1122	Khan Yunis	Palestine	Asia/Pacific	0.674	9	0.676
1123	Yaracuy	Venezuela	America	0.709	20	0.676
1124	Irian Jaya (Papua and Papua Barat)	Indonesia	Asia/Pacific	0.728	28	0.675
1125	Bogra, Gaibandha, Jaypurhat	Bangladesh	Asia/Pacific	0.685	14	0.674
1126	Fogo	Cape Verde	Africa	0.668	3	0.674
1127	Central	Guatemala	America	0.662	2	0.674
1128	West Bengal	India	Asia/Pacific	0.685	27	0.674
1129	Souyth Tarawa	Kiribati	Asia/Pacific	0.644	1	0.674
1130	Kurigram, Lalmonirhat, Rangpur	Bangladesh	Asia/Pacific	0.685	15	0.673
1131	East Nusa Tenggara	Indonesia	Asia/Pacific	0.728	29	0.673
1132	Basra	Iraq	Asia/Pacific	0.695	14	0.673
1133	Tubas	Palestine	Asia/Pacific	0.674	10	0.673
1134	Deir El-Balah	Palestine	Asia/Pacific	0.674	11	0.673
1135	Khatlon	Tajikistan	Asia/Pacific	0.691	5	0.673
1136	Brahmanbaria, Chandpur, Comilla	Bangladesh	Asia/Pacific	0.685	16	0.672
1137	Nyanga	Gabon	Africa	0.733	7	0.672
1138	Eastern	Morocco	Africa	0.71	6	0.672
1139	Enugu	Nigeria	Africa	0.56	6	0.672
1140	Zanzibar West	Tanzania	Africa	0.555	1	0.672
1141	Dinajpur, Nilphamari, Panchagarh, Thakurgaon	Bangladesh	Asia/Pacific	0.685	17	0.671
1142	Trarza incl Nouakchott	Mauritania	Africa	0.563	3	0.671
1143	City of Kigali	Rwanda	Africa	0.578	1	0.671
1144	Guarico	Venezuela	America	0.709	21	0.671
1145	Harare	Zimbabwe	Africa	0.598	2	0.671
1146	Luganville	Vanuatu	Asia/Pacific	0.621	2	0.668
1147	Lusaka	Zambia	Africa	0.595	1	0.668
1148	Tsirang	Bhutan	Asia/Pacific	0.698	8	0.667
1149	Centre (incl Yaounde)	Cameroon	Africa	0.588	3	0.667
1150	Ogooue Lolo	Gabon	Africa	0.733	8	0.667
1151	Sayabury	Laos	Asia/Pacific	0.617	2	0.667
1152	Hebron	Palestine	Asia/Pacific	0.674	12	0.667
1153	Chhattisgarh	India	Asia/Pacific	0.685	28	0.665
1154	Wasit	Iraq	Asia/Pacific	0.695	15	0.665
1155	Ngounie	Gabon	Africa	0.733	9	0.664
1156	Tripura	India	Asia/Pacific	0.685	29	0.664
1157	Centre south	Morocco	Africa	0.71	7	0.664
1158	Vaupis	Colombia	America	0.788	33	0.663
1159	Dadra and Nagar Haveli	India	Asia/Pacific	0.685	30	0.663
1160	Najaf	Iraq	Asia/Pacific	0.695	16	0.663
1161	Feni, Lakshmipur, Noakhali	Bangladesh	Asia/Pacific	0.685	18	0.661
1162	Kishoreganj, Mymensingh, Netrakona	Bangladesh	Asia/Pacific	0.685	19	0.661
1163	Maputo Cidade	Mozambique	Africa	0.493	1	0.661
1164	Jericho and Al Aghwar	Palestine	Asia/Pacific	0.674	13	0.661
1165	Gaza City	Palestine	Asia/Pacific	0.674	14	0.661
1166	Copperbelt	Zambia	Africa	0.595	2	0.661
1167	Central-Norte (Boaco, Chontales, Jinotega, Matagalpa, Esteli, Madriz, Nueva Segovia)	Nicaragua	America	0.706	2	0.66
1168	Rafah	Palestine	Asia/Pacific	0.674	15	0.66
1169	Samtse	Bhutan	Asia/Pacific	0.698	9	0.659
1170	Embera Wounaan	Panama	America	0.839	10	0.659
1171	North Gaza	Palestine	Asia/Pacific	0.674	16	0.658
1172	Gandaki province	Nepal	Asia/Pacific	0.622	2	0.657
1173	Portuguesa	Venezuela	America	0.709	22	0.657
1174	Tibet	China	Asia/Pacific	0.797	31	0.656
1175	Central	Kenya	Africa	0.628	2	0.656
1176	Islamabad (ICT)	Pakistan	Asia/Pacific	0.544	1	0.656
1177	Regiao Centro	São Tomé and Príncipe	Africa	0.637	1	0.656
1178	Barinas	Venezuela	America	0.709	23	0.656
1179	Trongsa	Bhutan	Asia/Pacific	0.698	10	0.655
1180	North-Oriental	Guatemala	America	0.662	3	0.655
1181	Assam	India	Asia/Pacific	0.685	31	0.655
1182	Otjozondjupa	Namibia	Africa	0.665	6	0.654
1183	Muthanna	Iraq	Asia/Pacific	0.695	17	0.653
1184	Atlantida	Honduras	America	0.645	4	0.652
1185	Borikhamxay	Laos	Asia/Pacific	0.617	3	0.652
1186	Samdrup jongkhar	Bhutan	Asia/Pacific	0.698	11	0.651
1187	Ashanti	Ghana	Africa	0.628	2	0.651
1188	Madhya Pradesh	India	Asia/Pacific	0.685	32	0.651
1189	Kachin	Myanmar	Asia/Pacific	0.609	2	0.651
1190	Maulvibazar, Sylhet	Bangladesh	Asia/Pacific	0.685	20	0.65
1191	Uttar Pradesh	India	Asia/Pacific	0.685	33	0.65
1192	Vaitupu, Nui, Nukufetau	Tuvalu	Asia/Pacific	0.689	2	0.65
1193	S.Antao	Cape Verde	Africa	0.668	4	0.649
1194	Orissa	India	Asia/Pacific	0.685	34	0.649
1195	Potosi	Bolivia	America	0.733	9	0.648
1196	Occidental	El Salvador	America	0.678	2	0.648
1197	South-Oriental	Guatemala	America	0.662	4	0.648
1198	Cayo	Belize	America	0.721	4	0.647
1199	Shefa	Vanuatu	Asia/Pacific	0.621	3	0.647
1200	Eastern	Ghana	Africa	0.628	3	0.646
1201	Zaire	Angola	Africa	0.616	3	0.645
1202	Central II	El Salvador	America	0.678	3	0.645
1203	Maysan	Iraq	Asia/Pacific	0.695	18	0.645
1204	Habiganj, Sunamganj	Bangladesh	Asia/Pacific	0.685	21	0.644
1205	Edo	Nigeria	Africa	0.56	7	0.644
1206	Xiengkhuang	Laos	Asia/Pacific	0.617	4	0.643
1207	Dar Es Salam	Tanzania	Africa	0.555	2	0.643
1208	Dagana	Bhutan	Asia/Pacific	0.698	12	0.642
1209	Banteay Mean Chey	Cambodia	Asia/Pacific	0.606	2	0.642
1210	Peten	Guatemala	America	0.662	5	0.642
1211	Lome	Togo	Africa	0.571	1	0.642
1212	South-Occidental	Guatemala	America	0.662	6	0.641
1213	Central 1 (Central South)	Uganda	Africa	0.582	2	0.641
1214	Pemagatshel	Bhutan	Asia/Pacific	0.698	13	0.64
1215	Regiao do Principe	São Tomé and Príncipe	Africa	0.637	2	0.64
1216	Wangdi	Bhutan	Asia/Pacific	0.698	14	0.639
1217	Jharkhand	India	Asia/Pacific	0.685	35	0.639
1218	ARMM	Philippines	Asia/Pacific	0.72	17	0.639
1219	Mongar	Bhutan	Asia/Pacific	0.698	15	0.638
1220	Liquica	Timor-Leste	Asia/Pacific	0.634	2	0.638
1221	Apure	Venezuela	America	0.709	24	0.638
1222	Zhemgang	Bhutan	Asia/Pacific	0.698	16	0.636
1223	Ogooue Ivindo	Gabon	Africa	0.733	10	0.636
1224	Takaev	Cambodia	Asia/Pacific	0.606	3	0.635
1225	Oriental	El Salvador	America	0.678	4	0.635
1226	Central	Ghana	Africa	0.628	4	0.635
1227	Kayah	Myanmar	Asia/Pacific	0.609	3	0.635
1228	Oshikoto	Namibia	Africa	0.665	7	0.634
1229	Yoro	Honduras	America	0.645	5	0.633
1230	Inchiri	Mauritania	Africa	0.563	4	0.633
1231	Maputo Provincia	Mozambique	Africa	0.493	2	0.633
1232	Mon	Myanmar	Asia/Pacific	0.609	4	0.633
1233	Kogi	Nigeria	Africa	0.56	8	0.633
1234	Lhuntse	Bhutan	Asia/Pacific	0.698	17	0.632
1235	Omusati	Namibia	Africa	0.665	8	0.632
1236	Manus	Papua New Guinea	Asia/Pacific	0.576	2	0.632
1237	Sud	Cameroon	Africa	0.588	4	0.631
1238	Abia	Nigeria	Africa	0.56	9	0.631
1239	Khagrachhari, Rangamati (Chattagram)	Bangladesh	Asia/Pacific	0.685	22	0.63
1240	Comayagua	Honduras	America	0.645	6	0.63
1241	Yamoussoukro	Ivory Coast	Africa	0.582	1	0.63
1242	Vientiane Province	Laos	Asia/Pacific	0.617	5	0.63
1243	Khartoum	Sudan	Africa	0.511	1	0.63
1244	Western	Ghana	Africa	0.628	5	0.629
1245	Kie Ntem	Equatorial Guinea	Africa	0.674	3	0.628
1246	Northern	Sudan	Africa	0.511	2	0.628
1247	Mandalay, NayPyitaw	Myanmar	Asia/Pacific	0.609	5	0.627
1248	Caprivi	Namibia	Africa	0.665	9	0.626
1249	Kuna Yala	Panama	America	0.839	11	0.626
1250	Nanumea, Nanumaga, Niutao	Tuvalu	Asia/Pacific	0.689	3	0.626
1251	Ouest	Cameroon	Africa	0.588	5	0.625
1252	Dakar	Senegal	Africa	0.53	1	0.625
1253	Manufahi	Timor-Leste	Asia/Pacific	0.634	3	0.625
1254	Grande Comore (Ngazidja)	Comoros	Africa	0.603	1	0.624
1255	Colon	Honduras	America	0.645	7	0.624
1256	Manatuto	Timor-Leste	Asia/Pacific	0.634	4	0.624
1257	Kampong Chhnang	Cambodia	Asia/Pacific	0.606	4	0.623
1258	Kinshasa	DRC	Africa	0.522	1	0.623
1259	Line and Phoenix Group	Kiribati	Asia/Pacific	0.644	2	0.623
1260	Trashiyangtse	Bhutan	Asia/Pacific	0.698	18	0.621
1261	Ekiti	Nigeria	Africa	0.56	10	0.621
1262	East New Britain	Papua New Guinea	Asia/Pacific	0.576	3	0.621
1263	Cova Lima	Timor-Leste	Asia/Pacific	0.634	5	0.621
1264	Moheli	Comoros	Africa	0.603	2	0.62
1265	Eastern	Kenya	Africa	0.628	3	0.62
1266	New Ireland	Papua New Guinea	Asia/Pacific	0.576	4	0.62
1267	Centro Sur	Equatorial Guinea	Africa	0.674	4	0.619
1268	Rift Valley	Kenya	Africa	0.628	4	0.619
1269	Ondo	Nigeria	Africa	0.56	11	0.619
1270	Aileu	Timor-Leste	Asia/Pacific	0.634	6	0.619
1271	La Paz	Honduras	America	0.645	8	0.618
1272	Chin	Myanmar	Asia/Pacific	0.609	6	0.618
1273	Koshi province	Nepal	Asia/Pacific	0.622	3	0.618
1274	Delta	Nigeria	Africa	0.56	12	0.618
1275	Bihar	India	Asia/Pacific	0.685	36	0.617
1276	Montagnes	Ivory Coast	Africa	0.582	2	0.617
1277	Cuvette	Congo	Africa	0.649	3	0.616
1278	Santa Barbara	Honduras	America	0.645	9	0.616
1279	Rivers	Nigeria	Africa	0.56	13	0.616
1280	Osun	Nigeria	Africa	0.56	14	0.615
1281	Zanzibar South	Tanzania	Africa	0.555	3	0.615
1282	Bandarban, Cox s Bazar	Bangladesh	Asia/Pacific	0.685	23	0.614
1283	Northern Gilbert	Kiribati	Asia/Pacific	0.644	3	0.614
1284	Lumbini province	Nepal	Asia/Pacific	0.622	4	0.614
1285	Morobe	Papua New Guinea	Asia/Pacific	0.576	5	0.614
1286	Autonomous Region of Bougainville	Papua New Guinea	Asia/Pacific	0.576	6	0.614
1287	Namibe	Angola	Africa	0.616	4	0.613
1288	Valle	Honduras	America	0.645	10	0.613
1289	Southern Gilbert	Kiribati	Asia/Pacific	0.644	4	0.613
1290	West New Britain	Papua New Guinea	Asia/Pacific	0.576	7	0.613
1291	Kilimanjaro	Tanzania	Africa	0.555	4	0.613
1292	Siem Reab-Otdar Mean Chey	Cambodia	Asia/Pacific	0.606	5	0.612
1293	Santiago-Interior	Cape Verde	Africa	0.668	5	0.612
1294	Volta	Ghana	Africa	0.628	6	0.612
1295	Bissau	Guinea-Bissau	Africa	0.514	1	0.612
1296	Ocotepeque	Honduras	America	0.645	11	0.612
1297	North-Western	Zambia	Africa	0.595	3	0.612
1298	Abidjan	Ivory Coast	Africa	0.582	3	0.611
1299	Magway	Myanmar	Asia/Pacific	0.609	7	0.611
1300	Akwa Ibom	Nigeria	Africa	0.56	15	0.611
1301	Oyo	Nigeria	Africa	0.56	16	0.611
1302	Lautem	Timor-Leste	Asia/Pacific	0.634	7	0.611
1303	Viqueque	Timor-Leste	Asia/Pacific	0.634	8	0.611
1304	Trashigang	Bhutan	Asia/Pacific	0.698	19	0.61
1305	Western	Kenya	Africa	0.628	5	0.61
1306	Baucau	Timor-Leste	Asia/Pacific	0.634	9	0.61
1307	Prey Veaeng	Cambodia	Asia/Pacific	0.606	6	0.609
1308	El Paraiso	Honduras	America	0.645	12	0.609
1309	Champasack	Laos	Asia/Pacific	0.617	6	0.609
1310	Omaheke	Namibia	Africa	0.665	10	0.609
1311	Svay Rieng	Cambodia	Asia/Pacific	0.606	7	0.608
1312	Taninthayi	Myanmar	Asia/Pacific	0.609	8	0.608
1313	Bobonaro	Timor-Leste	Asia/Pacific	0.634	10	0.608
1314	Malampa	Vanuatu	Asia/Pacific	0.621	4	0.608
1315	Lunda Sul	Angola	Africa	0.616	5	0.607
1316	Brong Ahafo	Ghana	Africa	0.628	7	0.607
1317	Choluteca	Honduras	America	0.645	13	0.607
1318	Coast	Kenya	Africa	0.628	6	0.607
1319	Ngobe Bugle	Panama	America	0.839	12	0.607
1320	Regiao Norte	São Tomé and Príncipe	Africa	0.637	3	0.607
1321	Western Highlands	Papua New Guinea	Asia/Pacific	0.576	8	0.606
1322	Regiao Sul	São Tomé and Príncipe	Africa	0.637	4	0.606
1323	Ziguinchor	Senegal	Africa	0.53	2	0.606
1324	Kandal	Cambodia	Asia/Pacific	0.606	8	0.605
1325	Nyanza	Kenya	Africa	0.628	7	0.604
1326	Kwara	Nigeria	Africa	0.56	17	0.604
1327	Nahr El Nil	Sudan	Africa	0.511	3	0.604
1328	Bengo	Angola	Africa	0.616	6	0.603
1329	Niari	Congo	Africa	0.649	4	0.603
1330	Bas Sassandra	Ivory Coast	Africa	0.582	4	0.603
1331	Bago	Myanmar	Asia/Pacific	0.609	9	0.603
1332	Bat Dambang-Krong Pailin	Cambodia	Asia/Pacific	0.606	9	0.601
1333	Olancho	Honduras	America	0.645	14	0.601
1334	Sudurpashchim province	Nepal	Asia/Pacific	0.622	5	0.601
1335	Wele Nzas	Equatorial Guinea	Africa	0.674	5	0.6
1336	Luangprabang	Laos	Asia/Pacific	0.617	7	0.6
1337	Khammuane	Laos	Asia/Pacific	0.617	8	0.6
1338	Sagaing	Myanmar	Asia/Pacific	0.609	10	0.599
1339	Pemba South	Tanzania	Africa	0.555	5	0.599
1340	Dire Dawa	Ethiopia	Africa	0.497	2	0.597
1341	Karnali province	Nepal	Asia/Pacific	0.622	6	0.597
1342	Central Gibert	Kiribati	Asia/Pacific	0.644	5	0.596
1343	Copan	Honduras	America	0.645	15	0.595
1344	Intibuca	Honduras	America	0.645	16	0.595
1345	Attapeu	Laos	Asia/Pacific	0.617	9	0.595
1346	Central 2 (Central North)	Uganda	Africa	0.582	3	0.595
1347	Midlands	Zimbabwe	Africa	0.598	3	0.595
1348	Pemba North	Tanzania	Africa	0.555	6	0.594
1349	Malange	Angola	Africa	0.616	7	0.593
1350	Atlantico (Rio San Juan, Atlantico Norte (Raan), Atlantico Sur (Raas))	Nicaragua	America	0.706	3	0.593
1351	Southern	Zambia	Africa	0.595	4	0.593
1352	Chimbu, Simbu	Papua New Guinea	Asia/Pacific	0.576	9	0.592
1353	Benue	Nigeria	Africa	0.56	18	0.591
1354	AJK	Pakistan	Asia/Pacific	0.544	2	0.591
1355	Brokopondo and Sipaliwini	Suriname	America	0.722	5	0.591
1356	Zanzibar North	Tanzania	Africa	0.555	7	0.591
1357	Masvingo	Zimbabwe	Africa	0.598	4	0.591
1358	Bokeo	Laos	Asia/Pacific	0.617	10	0.59
1359	Ohangwena	Namibia	Africa	0.665	11	0.59
1360	Ogun	Nigeria	Africa	0.56	19	0.59
1361	North	Guatemala	America	0.662	7	0.589
1362	Central	Papua New Guinea	Asia/Pacific	0.576	10	0.589
1363	Central	Zambia	Africa	0.595	5	0.589
1364	Huaphanh	Laos	Asia/Pacific	0.617	11	0.588
1365	Kunene	Namibia	Africa	0.665	12	0.588
1366	Manicaland	Zimbabwe	Africa	0.598	5	0.588
1367	North-Occidental	Guatemala	America	0.662	8	0.587
1368	Maseru	Lesotho	Africa	0.55	1	0.587
1369	Adrar	Mauritania	Africa	0.563	5	0.587
1370	Cross River	Nigeria	Africa	0.56	20	0.587
1371	Bayelsa	Nigeria	Africa	0.56	21	0.587
1372	Matebeleland South	Zimbabwe	Africa	0.598	6	0.587
1373	Sekong	Laos	Asia/Pacific	0.617	12	0.586
1374	Gilgit Baltistan	Pakistan	Asia/Pacific	0.544	3	0.586
1375	Western Urban	Sierra Leone	Africa	0.467	1	0.586
1376	Ayeyarwaddy	Myanmar	Asia/Pacific	0.609	11	0.585
1377	East Central (Busoga)	Uganda	Africa	0.582	4	0.585
1378	Mashonaland East	Zimbabwe	Africa	0.598	7	0.585
1379	West (incl Metropolitain area)	Haiti	America	0.554	1	0.584
1380	Blantyre	Malawi	Africa	0.517	1	0.584
1381	Harari	Ethiopia	Africa	0.497	3	0.583
1382	Luangnamtha	Laos	Asia/Pacific	0.617	13	0.583
1383	Western	Papua New Guinea	Asia/Pacific	0.576	11	0.583
1384	Upper East	Ghana	Africa	0.628	8	0.582
1385	Analamanga	Madagascar	Africa	0.487	1	0.582
1386	Bamako	Mali	Africa	0.419	1	0.582
1387	Kayin	Myanmar	Asia/Pacific	0.609	12	0.581
1388	Eastern (Bukedi, Bugishu, Teso)	Uganda	Africa	0.582	5	0.581
1389	Tafea	Vanuatu	Asia/Pacific	0.621	5	0.581
1390	Sanma	Vanuatu	Asia/Pacific	0.621	6	0.581
1391	Kampot-Krong Kaeb-Krong Preah Sihanouk	Cambodia	Asia/Pacific	0.606	10	0.58
1392	Montserrado	Liberia	Africa	0.51	1	0.58
1393	Milne Bay	Papua New Guinea	Asia/Pacific	0.576	12	0.58
1394	Preah Vihear-Stueng Traeng-Kracheh	Cambodia	Asia/Pacific	0.606	11	0.579
1395	Oudomxay	Laos	Asia/Pacific	0.617	14	0.579
1396	Anjouan (Ndzouani)	Comoros	Africa	0.603	3	0.578
1397	Kanifing	Gambia	Africa	0.524	1	0.578
1398	Madang	Papua New Guinea	Asia/Pacific	0.576	13	0.578
1399	Plateaux	Congo	Africa	0.649	5	0.577
1400	Gracias a Dios	Honduras	America	0.645	17	0.577
1401	Berea	Lesotho	Africa	0.55	2	0.577
1402	Gasa	Bhutan	Asia/Pacific	0.698	20	0.576
1403	Savannakhet	Laos	Asia/Pacific	0.617	15	0.575
1404	Northern, Oro	Papua New Guinea	Asia/Pacific	0.576	14	0.575
1405	Kavango	Namibia	Africa	0.665	13	0.574
1406	Plateau	Nigeria	Africa	0.56	22	0.574
1407	Atlantique (incl Littoral (Cotonou))	Benin	Africa	0.515	1	0.573
1408	Jiwaka	Papua New Guinea	Asia/Pacific	0.576	15	0.573
1409	Iringa, Njombe	Tanzania	Africa	0.555	8	0.572
1410	Southwest (Ankole, Kigezi)	Uganda	Africa	0.582	6	0.572
1411	Banjul	Gambia	Africa	0.524	2	0.571
1412	East Sepik	Papua New Guinea	Asia/Pacific	0.576	16	0.571
1413	Kuanza Norte	Angola	Africa	0.616	8	0.57
1414	Centre (incl Ouagadougou)	Burkina Faso	Africa	0.459	1	0.57
1415	East	Rwanda	Africa	0.578	2	0.57
1416	Ainaro	Timor-Leste	Asia/Pacific	0.634	11	0.57
1417	Uige	Angola	Africa	0.616	9	0.569
1418	Upper West	Ghana	Africa	0.628	9	0.569
1419	North	Haiti	America	0.554	2	0.569
1420	Madhesh province	Nepal	Asia/Pacific	0.622	7	0.569
1421	Central (Kabul Wardak Kapisa Logar Parwan Panjsher)	Afghanistan	Asia/Pacific	0.496	1	0.568
1422	Rakhine	Myanmar	Asia/Pacific	0.609	13	0.568
1423	Mara	Tanzania	Africa	0.555	9	0.568
1424	Oecussi	Timor-Leste	Asia/Pacific	0.634	12	0.568
1425	Lempira	Honduras	America	0.645	18	0.567
1426	Sassandra-Marahoue	Ivory Coast	Africa	0.582	5	0.567
1427	Mashonaland West	Zimbabwe	Africa	0.598	8	0.567
1428	Singida	Tanzania	Africa	0.555	10	0.566
1429	Ermera	Timor-Leste	Asia/Pacific	0.634	13	0.566
1430	Bouenza	Congo	Africa	0.649	6	0.565
1431	West	Rwanda	Africa	0.578	3	0.565
1432	Dodoma	Tanzania	Africa	0.555	11	0.565
1433	Huambo	Angola	Africa	0.616	10	0.564
1434	Arusha, Manyara	Tanzania	Africa	0.555	12	0.564
1435	Pwani	Tanzania	Africa	0.555	13	0.564
1436	Penama	Vanuatu	Asia/Pacific	0.621	7	0.564
1437	Likouala	Congo	Africa	0.649	7	0.563
1438	Benguela	Angola	Africa	0.616	11	0.562
1439	Kampong Thum	Cambodia	Asia/Pacific	0.606	12	0.562
1440	Nord Ouest	Cameroon	Africa	0.588	6	0.561
1441	Kaduna	Nigeria	Africa	0.56	23	0.56
1442	Thies	Senegal	Africa	0.53	3	0.56
1443	Comoe	Ivory Coast	Africa	0.582	6	0.559
1444	Nassarawa	Nigeria	Africa	0.56	24	0.559
1445	Other northern (Chitipa, Karonga, Rumphi, Nkhata Bay)	Malawi	Africa	0.517	2	0.558
1446	Plateaux	Togo	Africa	0.571	2	0.558
1447	Centrale	Togo	Africa	0.571	3	0.558
1448	Sangha	Congo	Africa	0.649	8	0.556
1449	South	Rwanda	Africa	0.578	4	0.556
1450	North	Rwanda	Africa	0.578	5	0.555
1451	Kaoh Kong	Cambodia	Asia/Pacific	0.606	13	0.554
1452	Brikama	Gambia	Africa	0.524	3	0.554
1453	Phongsaly	Laos	Asia/Pacific	0.617	16	0.554
1454	Mzimba	Malawi	Africa	0.517	3	0.554
1455	Zone 1 (N'Djamena)	Chad	Africa	0.416	1	0.553
1456	Al Gezira	Sudan	Africa	0.511	4	0.553
1457	Mwanza, Geita	Tanzania	Africa	0.555	14	0.553
1458	Bangui	Central African Republic	Africa	0.414	1	0.552
1459	Tanga	Tanzania	Africa	0.555	15	0.552
1460	Maritime	Togo	Africa	0.571	4	0.552
1461	Kampong Cham (incl Tboung Khmum)	Cambodia	Asia/Pacific	0.606	14	0.551
1462	Western (Bunyoro, Tooro)	Uganda	Africa	0.582	7	0.551
1463	Punjab	Pakistan	Asia/Pacific	0.544	4	0.55
1464	West Sepik, Sandaun	Papua New Guinea	Asia/Pacific	0.576	17	0.55
1465	Mbeya	Tanzania	Africa	0.555	16	0.55
Low human development
1466	Diana	Madagascar	Africa	0.487	2	0.549
1467	Torba	Vanuatu	Asia/Pacific	0.621	8	0.549
1468	Northern	Zambia	Africa	0.595	6	0.549
1469	Cuvette Ouest	Congo	Africa	0.649	9	0.548
1470	Gambela	Ethiopia	Africa	0.497	4	0.548
1471	Adamawa	Nigeria	Africa	0.56	25	0.548
1472	Lunda Norte	Angola	Africa	0.616	12	0.547
1473	Est	Cameroon	Africa	0.588	7	0.547
1474	Huila	Angola	Africa	0.616	13	0.546
1475	North-West	Haiti	America	0.554	3	0.546
1476	Butha-Buthe	Lesotho	Africa	0.55	3	0.545
1477	Leribe	Lesotho	Africa	0.55	4	0.545
1478	Lindi	Tanzania	Africa	0.555	17	0.545
1479	Western	Zambia	Africa	0.595	7	0.545
1480	Cunene	Angola	Africa	0.616	14	0.544
1481	North-East	Haiti	America	0.554	4	0.544
1482	Eastern Highlands	Papua New Guinea	Asia/Pacific	0.576	18	0.544
1483	Ruvuma	Tanzania	Africa	0.555	18	0.544
1484	Matebeleland North	Zimbabwe	Africa	0.598	9	0.544
1485	Nord-Kivu	DRC	Africa	0.522	2	0.543
1486	Mtwara	Tanzania	Africa	0.555	19	0.542
1487	Mashonaland Central	Zimbabwe	Africa	0.598	10	0.542
1488	Kasungu	Malawi	Africa	0.517	4	0.541
1489	Gulf	Papua New Guinea	Asia/Pacific	0.576	19	0.541
1490	South	Haiti	America	0.554	5	0.54
1491	Lagunes	Ivory Coast	Africa	0.582	7	0.54
1492	Mafeteng	Lesotho	Africa	0.55	5	0.54
1493	Kara	Togo	Africa	0.571	5	0.54
1494	Mondol Kiri-Rotanak Kiri	Cambodia	Asia/Pacific	0.606	15	0.539
1495	West Nile	Uganda	Africa	0.582	8	0.539
1496	Kagera	Tanzania	Africa	0.555	20	0.538
1497	Taraba	Nigeria	Africa	0.56	26	0.537
1498	Brakna	Mauritania	Africa	0.563	6	0.536
1499	Eastern	Zambia	Africa	0.595	8	0.536
1500	Lekoumou	Congo	Africa	0.649	10	0.535
1501	Cacheu	Guinea-Bissau	Africa	0.514	2	0.535
1502	Moxico	Angola	Africa	0.616	15	0.534
1503	Pousat	Cambodia	Asia/Pacific	0.606	16	0.534
1504	Kouilou	Congo	Africa	0.649	11	0.534
1505	Goh-Djiboua	Ivory Coast	Africa	0.582	8	0.534
1506	Saravane	Laos	Asia/Pacific	0.617	17	0.534
1507	Queme (incl Plateau)	Benin	Africa	0.515	2	0.533
1508	South-East	Haiti	America	0.554	6	0.533
1509	Fatick	Senegal	Africa	0.53	4	0.533
1510	Kuando Kubango	Angola	Africa	0.616	16	0.532
1511	Sud-Kivu	DRC	Africa	0.522	3	0.532
1512	Shan	Myanmar	Asia/Pacific	0.609	14	0.531
1513	Tigray	Ethiopia	Africa	0.497	5	0.53
1514	Tagant	Mauritania	Africa	0.563	7	0.53
1515	Gaza	Mozambique	Africa	0.493	3	0.53
1516	Niger	Nigeria	Africa	0.56	27	0.53
1517	Morogoro	Tanzania	Africa	0.555	21	0.529
1518	North (Karamoja, Lango, Acholi)	Uganda	Africa	0.582	9	0.527
1519	Bie	Angola	Africa	0.616	17	0.526
1520	Northern	Ghana	Africa	0.628	10	0.526
1521	Mohale s Hoek	Lesotho	Africa	0.55	6	0.526
1522	Lilongwe	Malawi	Africa	0.517	5	0.526
1523	Red Sea	Sudan	Africa	0.511	5	0.526
1524	Grande-Anse, Nippes	Haiti	America	0.554	7	0.525
1525	Zomba	Malawi	Africa	0.517	6	0.525
1526	Luapula	Zambia	Africa	0.595	9	0.524
1527	Inhambane	Mozambique	Africa	0.493	4	0.522
1528	Djibouti	Djibouti	Africa	0.513	1	0.521
1529	Bas-Congo	DRC	Africa	0.522	4	0.521
1530	Artibonite	Haiti	America	0.554	8	0.521
1531	Qasha s Nek	Lesotho	Africa	0.55	7	0.521
1532	Pool	Congo	Africa	0.649	12	0.519
1533	Abyan, Aden (town and countryside), Lahej, Ad Dali (Al Dhalih)	Yemen	Asia/Pacific	0.47	1	0.519
1534	Zou (incl Collines)	Benin	Africa	0.515	3	0.518
1535	Sindh	Pakistan	Asia/Pacific	0.544	5	0.518
1536	Shinyanga, Simiyu	Tanzania	Africa	0.555	22	0.518
1537	North (Samangan Sar-e-Pul Balkh Jawzjan Faryab)	Afghanistan	Asia/Pacific	0.496	2	0.517
1538	Biombo	Guinea-Bissau	Africa	0.514	3	0.517
1539	Sofala	Mozambique	Africa	0.493	5	0.516
1540	Denguele	Ivory Coast	Africa	0.582	9	0.515
1541	Khyber Pakhtunkhwa (NWFrontier)	Pakistan	Asia/Pacific	0.544	6	0.515
1542	Quthing	Lesotho	Africa	0.55	8	0.512
1543	Mulanje	Malawi	Africa	0.517	7	0.512
1544	Tillabery (incl Niamey)	Niger	Africa	0.419	1	0.512
1545	Manica	Mozambique	Africa	0.493	6	0.511
1546	Southern Highlands	Papua New Guinea	Asia/Pacific	0.576	20	0.511
1547	Enga	Papua New Guinea	Asia/Pacific	0.576	21	0.511
1548	Jawf, Hadramet, Shabda (Shabwah), Marib, Mohra (Al Mahrah)	Yemen	Asia/Pacific	0.47	2	0.51
1549	Orientale	DRC	Africa	0.522	5	0.508
1550	Agadez	Niger	Africa	0.419	2	0.508
1551	Katanga	DRC	Africa	0.522	6	0.507
1552	Debubawi Keih Bahri	Eritrea	Africa	0.503	2	0.507
1553	Bolama	Guinea-Bissau	Africa	0.514	4	0.507
1554	Sava	Madagascar	Africa	0.487	3	0.507
1555	Centre	Haiti	America	0.554	9	0.506
1556	Alaotra Mangoro	Madagascar	Africa	0.487	4	0.506
1557	Western Rural	Sierra Leone	Africa	0.467	2	0.506
1558	Kampong Spueu	Cambodia	Asia/Pacific	0.606	17	0.505
1559	Quinara	Guinea-Bissau	Africa	0.514	5	0.505
1560	Analanjirofo	Madagascar	Africa	0.487	5	0.505
1561	Other southern (Balaka, Mwanza, Phalombe, Chiradzulu, Chikwawa, Nsanje, neno)	Malawi	Africa	0.517	8	0.504
1562	Adamaoua	Cameroon	Africa	0.588	8	0.502
1563	Rukwa, Katavi	Tanzania	Africa	0.555	23	0.501
1564	River Gee	Liberia	Africa	0.51	2	0.5
1565	Mono (incl Couffo)	Benin	Africa	0.515	4	0.499
1566	Bandundu	DRC	Africa	0.522	7	0.499
1567	Maryland	Liberia	Africa	0.51	3	0.499
1568	Boeny	Madagascar	Africa	0.487	6	0.499
1569	Sinnar	Sudan	Africa	0.511	6	0.499
1570	Taiz	Yemen	Asia/Pacific	0.47	3	0.499
1571	Equateur	DRC	Africa	0.522	8	0.498
1572	Tombali	Guinea-Bissau	Africa	0.514	6	0.498
1573	White Nile	Sudan	Africa	0.511	7	0.498
1574	Haute Matsiatra	Madagascar	Africa	0.487	7	0.497
1575	Atsinanana	Madagascar	Africa	0.487	8	0.497
1576	Kano	Nigeria	Africa	0.56	28	0.497
1577	Ben-Gumz	Ethiopia	Africa	0.497	6	0.496
1578	Assaba	Mauritania	Africa	0.563	8	0.496
1579	Central Highlands (Bamyan Daikundi)	Afghanistan	Asia/Pacific	0.496	3	0.495
1580	South East (Ghazni Paktya Paktika Khost)	Afghanistan	Asia/Pacific	0.496	4	0.495
1581	SNNP	Ethiopia	Africa	0.497	7	0.494
1582	Kindia	Guinea	Africa	0.5	2	0.494
1583	Grand Gedeh	Liberia	Africa	0.51	4	0.494
1584	Other central (Nkhota Kota, Mchinji, Dowa, Ntchisi, Dedza, Ntcheu)	Malawi	Africa	0.517	9	0.494
1585	Margibi	Liberia	Africa	0.51	5	0.493
1586	Kasai Oriental	DRC	Africa	0.522	9	0.492
1587	Nimba	Liberia	Africa	0.51	6	0.492
1588	Machinga	Malawi	Africa	0.517	10	0.492
1589	Savanes	Togo	Africa	0.571	6	0.492
1590	Oromiya	Ethiopia	Africa	0.497	8	0.491
1591	Kigoma	Tanzania	Africa	0.555	24	0.491
1592	Bafata	Guinea-Bissau	Africa	0.514	7	0.49
1593	Salima	Malawi	Africa	0.517	11	0.49
1594	West (Bubanza, Buja Rural, Cibitoke, Mairie de Bujumbura)	Burundi	Africa	0.439	1	0.489
1595	Thyolo	Malawi	Africa	0.517	12	0.489
1596	Hauts Bassins	Burkina Faso	Africa	0.459	2	0.487
1597	North Eastern	Kenya	Africa	0.628	8	0.487
1598	Bomi	Liberia	Africa	0.51	7	0.487
1599	Vakinankaratra	Madagascar	Africa	0.487	9	0.487
1600	Itasy	Madagascar	Africa	0.487	10	0.486
1601	N Zerekore	Guinea	Africa	0.5	3	0.485
1602	Mokhotlong	Lesotho	Africa	0.55	9	0.485
1603	Zone 6 (Mayo-Kebbi Est and Ouest)	Chad	Africa	0.416	2	0.484
1604	Saint Louis	Senegal	Africa	0.53	5	0.482
1605	Amhara	Ethiopia	Africa	0.497	9	0.481
1606	Gorgol	Mauritania	Africa	0.563	9	0.48
1607	Hela	Papua New Guinea	Asia/Pacific	0.576	22	0.48
1608	Debub	Eritrea	Africa	0.503	3	0.479
1609	Kuanza Sul	Angola	Africa	0.616	18	0.478
1610	Tabora	Tanzania	Africa	0.555	25	0.478
1611	East (Nangarhar Kunar Laghman Nooristan)	Afghanistan	Asia/Pacific	0.496	5	0.477
1612	Anamoroni Mania	Madagascar	Africa	0.487	11	0.477
1613	Gombe	Nigeria	Africa	0.56	29	0.476
1614	Boke	Guinea	Africa	0.5	4	0.475
1615	Borno	Nigeria	Africa	0.56	30	0.475
1616	Tete	Mozambique	Africa	0.493	7	0.473
1617	Maniema	DRC	Africa	0.522	10	0.472
1618	Kerewan	Gambia	Africa	0.524	4	0.472
1619	Affar	Ethiopia	Africa	0.497	10	0.471
1620	Hodh Gharbi	Mauritania	Africa	0.563	10	0.471
1621	North Darfur	Sudan	Africa	0.511	8	0.471
1622	South (Bururi, Makamba)	Burundi	Africa	0.439	2	0.47
1623	Extreme Nord	Cameroon	Africa	0.588	9	0.47
1624	Lacs	Ivory Coast	Africa	0.582	10	0.47
1625	Bong	Liberia	Africa	0.51	8	0.47
1626	Ibb	Yemen	Asia/Pacific	0.47	4	0.47
1627	Atacora (incl Donga)	Benin	Africa	0.515	5	0.469
1628	Sofia	Madagascar	Africa	0.487	12	0.468
1629	Kaolack	Senegal	Africa	0.53	6	0.468
1630	Central Equatoria	South Sudan	Africa	0.388	1	0.468
1631	North Kordofan	Sudan	Africa	0.511	9	0.468
1632	Mansakonko	Gambia	Africa	0.524	5	0.467
1633	Grand Kru	Liberia	Africa	0.51	9	0.467
1634	Mangochi	Malawi	Africa	0.517	13	0.467
1635	Kolda	Senegal	Africa	0.53	7	0.467
1636	Bombali	Sierra Leone	Africa	0.467	3	0.467
1637	West (Ghor Herat Badghis Farah)	Afghanistan	Asia/Pacific	0.496	6	0.466
1638	Louga	Senegal	Africa	0.53	8	0.466
1639	Nord	Cameroon	Africa	0.588	10	0.465
1640	Sinoe	Liberia	Africa	0.51	10	0.465
1641	North East (Baghlan Takhar Badakhshan Kunduz)	Afghanistan	Asia/Pacific	0.496	7	0.464
1642	Cascades	Burkina Faso	Africa	0.459	3	0.464
1643	Balochistan	Pakistan	Asia/Pacific	0.544	7	0.464
1644	Other Districts	Djibouti	Africa	0.513	2	0.463
1645	Mamou	Guinea	Africa	0.5	5	0.463
1646	Oio	Guinea-Bissau	Africa	0.514	8	0.461
1647	Bongolava	Madagascar	Africa	0.487	13	0.46
1648	Banadir	Somalia	Africa	0.361	1	0.46
1649	Kassala	Sudan	Africa	0.511	10	0.46
1650	Zone 8 (Mandoul, Moyen-Chari, Bahr Koh, Lac Iro)	Chad	Africa	0.416	3	0.459
1651	Thaba-Tseka	Lesotho	Africa	0.55	10	0.459
1652	Al Gedarif	Sudan	Africa	0.511	11	0.458
1653	Guidimagha	Mauritania	Africa	0.563	11	0.457
1654	Centre-Ouest	Burkina Faso	Africa	0.459	4	0.456
1655	Anseba	Eritrea	Africa	0.503	4	0.456
1656	Bo	Sierra Leone	Africa	0.467	4	0.456
1657	Borgou (incl Alibori)	Benin	Africa	0.515	6	0.455
1658	FATA	Pakistan	Asia/Pacific	0.544	8	0.455
1659	W Galbeed	Somalia	Africa	0.361	2	0.455
1660	River Cess	Liberia	Africa	0.51	11	0.454
1661	Kono	Sierra Leone	Africa	0.467	5	0.451
1662	Tambacounda	Senegal	Africa	0.53	9	0.45
1663	Ihorombe	Madagascar	Africa	0.487	14	0.449
1664	Nampula	Mozambique	Africa	0.493	8	0.449
1665	West Darfur	Sudan	Africa	0.511	12	0.449
1666	Lofa	Liberia	Africa	0.51	12	0.447
1667	Yobe	Nigeria	Africa	0.56	31	0.447
1668	Kasai Occidental	DRC	Africa	0.522	11	0.446
1669	Basse	Gambia	Africa	0.524	6	0.446
1670	Atsimo Andrefana	Madagascar	Africa	0.487	15	0.446
1671	Cabo delgado	Mozambique	Africa	0.493	9	0.446
1672	Zambezia	Mozambique	Africa	0.493	10	0.446
1673	Kailahun	Sierra Leone	Africa	0.467	6	0.446
1674	Katsina	Nigeria	Africa	0.56	32	0.445
1675	South Darfur	Sudan	Africa	0.511	13	0.445
1676	Kenema	Sierra Leone	Africa	0.467	7	0.444
1677	Vatovavy Fitovinany	Madagascar	Africa	0.487	16	0.443
1678	Niassa	Mozambique	Africa	0.493	11	0.443
1679	Plateau Central	Burkina Faso	Africa	0.459	5	0.442
1680	Sanaag	Somalia	Africa	0.361	3	0.442
1681	Centre-Sud	Burkina Faso	Africa	0.459	6	0.441
1682	Nord	Burkina Faso	Africa	0.459	7	0.441
1683	Middle (Gitega, Karuzi, Muramvya, Mwaro)	Burundi	Africa	0.439	3	0.441
1684	Zone 7 (Logone Occidental & Oriental, Monts de Lam, Tandjile Est & Ouest)	Chad	Africa	0.416	4	0.441
1685	Grand Bassa	Liberia	Africa	0.51	13	0.441
1686	Bonthe	Sierra Leone	Africa	0.467	8	0.441
1687	South Kordofan	Sudan	Africa	0.511	14	0.44
1688	Faranah	Guinea	Africa	0.5	6	0.437
1689	Diourbel	Senegal	Africa	0.53	10	0.437
1690	Tonkolili	Sierra Leone	Africa	0.467	9	0.435
1691	Western Equatoria	South Sudan	Africa	0.388	2	0.435
1692	Somali	Ethiopia	Africa	0.497	11	0.433
1693	Kambia	Sierra Leone	Africa	0.467	10	0.433
1694	Melaky	Madagascar	Africa	0.487	17	0.432
1695	Labe	Guinea	Africa	0.5	7	0.431
1696	Upper Nile	South Sudan	Africa	0.388	3	0.428
1697	Blue Nile	Sudan	Africa	0.511	15	0.428
1698	Betsiboka	Madagascar	Africa	0.487	18	0.426
1699	Koinadugu	Sierra Leone	Africa	0.467	11	0.426
1700	Bari	Somalia	Africa	0.361	4	0.426
1701	Moyamba	Sierra Leone	Africa	0.467	12	0.425
1702	Port Loko	Sierra Leone	Africa	0.467	13	0.424
1703	South (Uruzgan Helmand Zabul Nimroz Kandahar)	Afghanistan	Asia/Pacific	0.496	8	0.423
1704	Kankan	Guinea	Africa	0.5	8	0.423
1705	Grand Cape Mount	Liberia	Africa	0.51	14	0.423
1706	Hodh Charghi	Mauritania	Africa	0.563	12	0.423
1707	Boucle de Mouhoun	Burkina Faso	Africa	0.459	8	0.422
1708	East (Cankuzo, Rutana, Ruyigi )	Burundi	Africa	0.439	4	0.422
1709	Koulikoro	Mali	Africa	0.419	2	0.422
1710	Hodeida (Al Hudaydah), Mahweit (Al Mahwit)	Yemen	Asia/Pacific	0.47	5	0.422
1711	Western Bahr El Ghazal	South Sudan	Africa	0.388	4	0.42
1712	Beida (Al Bayda), Dhamar, Raimah	Yemen	Asia/Pacific	0.47	6	0.42
1713	Centre-Est	Burkina Faso	Africa	0.459	9	0.419
1714	Gabu	Guinea-Bissau	Africa	0.514	9	0.418
1715	Gbarpolu	Liberia	Africa	0.51	15	0.414
1716	Pujehun	Sierra Leone	Africa	0.467	14	0.414
1717	Hajja, Sada, Amran (Omran)	Yemen	Asia/Pacific	0.47	7	0.413
1718	RS I (Ombella Mpoko, Lobaye, Kemo, Nana Grebizi, Ouaka)	Central African Republic	Africa	0.414	2	0.412
1719	Janjabureh	Gambia	Africa	0.524	7	0.412
1720	Androy	Madagascar	Africa	0.487	19	0.412
1721	Semenawi Keih Bahri	Eritrea	Africa	0.503	5	0.411
1722	Atsimo Atsinanana	Madagascar	Africa	0.487	20	0.411
1723	Sokoto	Nigeria	Africa	0.56	33	0.411
1724	Centre-Nord	Burkina Faso	Africa	0.459	10	0.409
1725	Maradi	Niger	Africa	0.419	3	0.403
1726	Zamfora	Nigeria	Africa	0.56	34	0.403
1727	Sikasso	Mali	Africa	0.419	3	0.401
1728	Dosso	Niger	Africa	0.419	4	0.401
1729	RS IV (Haute-Kotto, Baminigui Bangoran, Vakaga)	Central African Republic	Africa	0.414	3	0.395
1730	Est	Burkina Faso	Africa	0.459	11	0.394
1731	Awdal	Somalia	Africa	0.361	5	0.393
1732	North (Kayanza, Kirundo, Muyinga, Ngozi)	Burundi	Africa	0.439	5	0.392
1733	RS II (Mambera Kadei, Nana Mambere, Sangha Mbaere)	Central African Republic	Africa	0.414	4	0.392
1734	Kayes	Mali	Africa	0.419	4	0.388
1735	Diffa	Niger	Africa	0.419	5	0.386
1736	Jigawa	Nigeria	Africa	0.56	35	0.385
1737	Zinder	Niger	Africa	0.419	6	0.384
1738	Bauchi	Nigeria	Africa	0.56	36	0.384
1739	Anosy	Madagascar	Africa	0.487	21	0.383
1740	Menabe	Madagascar	Africa	0.487	22	0.383
1741	Gao and Kidal	Mali	Africa	0.419	5	0.382
1742	Kebbi	Nigeria	Africa	0.56	37	0.379
1743	Gash-Barka	Eritrea	Africa	0.503	6	0.378
1744	Nugal	Somalia	Africa	0.361	6	0.376
1745	Eastern Equatoria	South Sudan	Africa	0.388	5	0.376
1746	Segou	Mali	Africa	0.419	6	0.374
1747	Tahoua	Niger	Africa	0.419	7	0.372
1748	Mudug	Somalia	Africa	0.361	7	0.372
1749	RS III (Ouham Pende, Ouham)	Central African Republic	Africa	0.414	5	0.371
1750	Sud-Ouest	Burkina Faso	Africa	0.459	12	0.364
1751	Kuntaur	Gambia	Africa	0.524	8	0.362
1752	Zone 3 (Guera, Batha, Salamat)	Chad	Africa	0.416	5	0.353
1753	RS V (Basse Kotto, Mbornou, Houte Mbormou)	Central African Republic	Africa	0.414	6	0.351
1754	Mopti	Mali	Africa	0.419	7	0.35
1755	Lakes	South Sudan	Africa	0.388	6	0.349
1756	Unity	South Sudan	Africa	0.388	7	0.343
1757	Sool	Somalia	Africa	0.361	8	0.336
1758	Jonglei	South Sudan	Africa	0.388	8	0.335
1759	Gedo	Somalia	Africa	0.361	9	0.329
1760	Tombouctou	Mali	Africa	0.419	8	0.328
1761	Lower Shabelle	Somalia	Africa	0.361	10	0.326
1762	Togdhere	Somalia	Africa	0.361	11	0.324
1763	Warrap	South Sudan	Africa	0.388	9	0.315
1764	Middle Shabelle	Somalia	Africa	0.361	12	0.314
1765	Northern Bahr El Ghazal	South Sudan	Africa	0.388	10	0.313
1766	Sahel	Burkina Faso	Africa	0.459	13	0.308
1767	Zone 4 (Ouaddai, Assongha, Sila, Biltine - Wadi Fira)	Chad	Africa	0.416	6	0.306
1768	Zone 5 (Chari-Baguimi, Dababa, Baguirmi, Hadjer Lamis)	Chad	Africa	0.416	7	0.303
1769	Lower Juba	Somalia	Africa	0.361	13	0.302
1770	Bakool	Somalia	Africa	0.361	14	0.296
1771	Bay	Somalia	Africa	0.361	15	0.296
1772	Hiran	Somalia	Africa	0.361	16	0.285
1773	Zone 2 (Borkou, Ennedi, Tibesti, Kanem, Barh El Gazal, Lac)	Chad	Africa	0.416	8	0.284
1774	Galguduud	Somalia	Africa	0.361	17	0.279
1775	Middle Juba	Somalia	Africa	0.361	18	0.23

== See also ==
- List of subnational entities with the highest and lowest Human Development Index
