= List of zones of Ethiopia =

A map of the regions and zones of Ethiopia

The regions of Ethiopia are administratively divided into 62 zones (Amharic: ዞን zonə, Oromo: Godina). The exact number of zones is unclear, as the names and number of zones given in documents by Ethiopia's Central Statistical Agency differ between 2005 and 2007. Various maps give different zone names and boundaries.

Zones are a 2nd level subdivision of Ethiopia, below regions and above woredas, or districts. The zones are listed below, by region.

== Addis Ababa ==
- Addis Ketema
- Akaky Kaliti
- Arada
- Bole
- Gullele
- Kirkos
- Kolfe Keranio
- Lemi Kura
- Lideta
- Nifas Silk-Lafto
- Yeka

== Afar Region ==
- Awsi Rasu
- Kilbet Rasu
- Gabi Rasu
- Fanti Rasu
- Hari Rasu
- Mahi Rasu (New Zone)
- Argobba (special woreda)

== Amhara Region ==
- Agew Awi Zone
- Bahir Dar Special Zone
- Central Gondar Zone
- East Gojjam Zone
- North Gojjam Zone
- North Gondar Zone
- North Shewa Zone
- North Wollo Zone
- Oromia Zone
- South Gondar Zone
- South Wollo Zone
- Wag Hemra Zone
- West Gondar Zone
- West Gojjam Zone

== Benishangul-Gumuz Region ==
- Asosa
- Kamashi
- Metekel

== Central Ethiopia Region ==
This region was created in 2023 from parts of the Southern Nations, Nationalities, and Peoples' Region.

- East Gurage Zone
- Gurage Zone
- Halaba Zone
- Hadiya Zone
- Kebena Special Woreda
- Kembata Zone
- Mareko Special Woreda
- Silt'e Zone
- Tembaro Special Woreda
- Yem Zone

== Dire Dawa ==
- Oromiyaa

== Gambela Region ==
- Anywaa
- Majang
- Nuer

=== Former zones ===
- Administrative Zone 1 (Gambela)
- Administrative Zone 2 (Gambela)
- Administrative Zone 3 (Gambela)
- Godere (woreda) (1991–1994: the only woreda in Administrative Zone 4; 1994–2001: part of Administrative Zone 2; 2007–present: part of Mezhenger Zone)

== Harari Region ==
- Amir-Nur Woreda
- Abadir Woreda
- Shenkor Woreda
- Jin'Eala Woreda
- Aboker Woreda
- Hakim Woreda
- Sofi Woreda
- Erer Woreda
- Dire-Teyara Woreda

== Oromia Region ==
Central Oromia Zone

- East Shewa
- North Shewa
- Southwest Shewa
- West Shewa
- Shaggar City

East Oromia Zone

- East Hararghe
- West Hararghe

Southeast Oromia Zone

- Arsi
- West Arsi
- East Bale
- Bale

South Oromia Zone

- East Borana
- Borana
- East Guji
- West Guji

Southwest Oromia Zone

- Illubabor
- Buno Bedele
- Jimma

West Oromia Zone

- East Welega
- Horo Guduru Welega
- Kelam Welega
- West Welega

== Sidama Region ==
Sidama Region's state council passed decision to form four zones. In this regard, four zones and one autonomous city administration formed on 2nd anniversary of the region.

- Central Sidama Zone
- Eastern Sidama Zone
- Northern Sidama Zone
- Southern Sidama Zone

== Somali Region ==
- Sitti Zone
- Fafan Zone
- Jarar Zone
- Erer Zone
- Nogob Zone
- Dollo Zone
- Korahe Zone
- Shabelle Zone
- Afder Zone
- Liben Zone
- Dhawa Zone
- Jigjiga Special Zone
- Tog Wajale Special Zone
- Degehabur Special Zone
- Gode Special Zone
- Kebri Beyah Special Zone
- Kebri Dahar Special Zone

== South Ethiopia Region ==
This region was created in 2023 from parts of the Southern Nations, Nationalities, and Peoples' Region.^{,}

- Ale Zone
- Ari Zone
- Basketo Zone
- Burji Zone
- Gamo Zone
- Gardula
- Gedeo Zone
- Gofa Zone
- Konso Zone
- Koore Zone
- South Omo Zone
- Wolayita Zone

== Southwest Ethiopia Peoples' Region ==
- Bench Sheko Zone
- Dawro Zone
- Keffa Zone
- Sheka Zone
- Konta Zone
- West Omo Zone

=== Former zones ===
- North Omo – abolished in 2000
- Keficho Shekicho – abolished in 2007

== Tigray Region ==
- Central Tigray
- East Tigray
- North West Tigray
- West Tigray
- South Tigray
- South East Tigray
- Mekele (special zone)

== See also ==
- Regions of Ethiopia
