= Meinit =

Coordinates: 6°30′N 35°45′E

Meinit was one of the 77 woredas in the Southern Nations, Nationalities, and Peoples' Region of Ethiopia. Part of the Bench Maji Zone, Meinit was bordered on the south by Dizi, on the west by Sheko, on the north by Bench, on the east by the Keficho Shekicho Zone, and on the southeast by the Omo River which separated it from the Debub Omo Zone. Towns in Meinit included Bachuma, and Jemu. Meinit was separated for Meinit Goldiya and Meinit Shasha woredas.

The part of this woreda which lied within 15 kilometers of the Omo was included in the Omo National Park.

Meinit was selected by the Ministry of Agriculture and Rural Development in 2004 as one of several woredas for voluntary resettlement for farmers from overpopulated areas, becoming the new home for a total of 6610 heads of households and 26,440 total family members.

== Demographics ==
Based on figures published by the Central Statistical Agency in 2005, this woreda has an estimated total population of 51,213, of whom 25,561 are men and 25,652 women; 5,162 or 10.08% of its population are urban dwellers, which is greater than the Zone average of 9.1%. With an estimated area of 4,333.69 square kilometers, Meinit has an estimated population density of 11.8 people per square kilometer, which is less than the Zone average of 20.

In the 1994 national census this woreda had a population of 35,541, of whom 17,824 were men and 17,717 women; 2,848 or 8.01% of its population were urban dwellers. The four largest ethnic groups reported in Meinit were the Me'en (87.97%), the Bench (3.77%), the Amhara (3.14%), and the Dizi (3.08%); all other ethnic groups made up 2.04% of the population. Me'en was spoken as a first language by 87.82% of the inhabitants, 5.21% spoke Amharic, 3.51% spoke Bench, and 2.91% spoke Dizin; the remaining 0.55% spoke all other primary languages reported. Concerning education, 6.18% of the population were considered literate; 4.33% of children aged 7–12 were in primary school; 2.14% of the children aged 13–14 were in junior secondary school, and 0.69% of the inhabitants aged 15–18 were in senior secondary school. Concerning sanitary conditions, about 48% of the urban and 5% of the total had toilet facilities.
