= Bench (woreda) =

Former administrative division of Ethiopia

Coordinates: 6°55′N 35°10′E

Bench was one of the 77 woredas in the Southern Nations, Nationalities, and Peoples' Region of Ethiopia. It was named for the Bench people, whose homeland lies in the northern part of the woreda. Part of the Bench Sheko

Bench was bordered on the south and east by Meinit, on the west by Sheko, and on the north by the Keficho Shekicho Zone. Towns in Bench included Aman and Mizan Teferi. Bench was divided into Debub Bench, Semien Bench, and She Bench, Gidi Bench woredas and Mizan Aman town; the southern part of Bench was added to Meinit Goldiya.

Rivers in Bench include the Akobo, which has its source in this woreda.

== Demographics ==
Based on figures published by the Central Statistical Agency in 2005, this woreda has an estimated total population of 299,151, of whom 150,827 are men and 148,324 women; 25,483 or 8.52% of its population are urban dwellers, which is less than the Zone average of 9.1%. With an estimated area of 2,128.91 square kilometers, Bench has an estimated population density of 140.5 people per square kilometer, which is greater than the Zone average of 20.

In the 1994 national census Bench had a population of 208,339, of whom 103,257 were men and 105,082 women; 14,067 or 6.75% of its population were urban dwellers. The five largest ethnic groups reported in this woreda were the Bench (62.21%), the Kafficho (9.42%), the Me'en (8.09%), the Amhara (6.27%), and the She (5.79%); all other ethnic groups made up 8.22% of the population. Bench was spoken as a first language by 62.49% of the inhabitants, 11.06% spoke Amharic, 8.1% spoke Me'en, 6.93% spoke Kafa, and 5.82% spoke She; the remaining 5.6% spoke all other primary languages reported. Concerning education, 19.95% of the population were considered literate; 13.18% of children aged 7–12 were in primary school; 6.08% of the children aged 13–14 were in junior secondary school, and 3.25% of the inhabitants aged 15–18 were in senior secondary school. Concerning sanitary conditions, about 81% of the urban and 22% of the total had toilet facilities.
