= Keficho Shekicho Zone =

Zone in the Southern Nations, Nationalities, and Peoples' Region of Ethiopia

Coordinates: 7°15′N 36°00′E

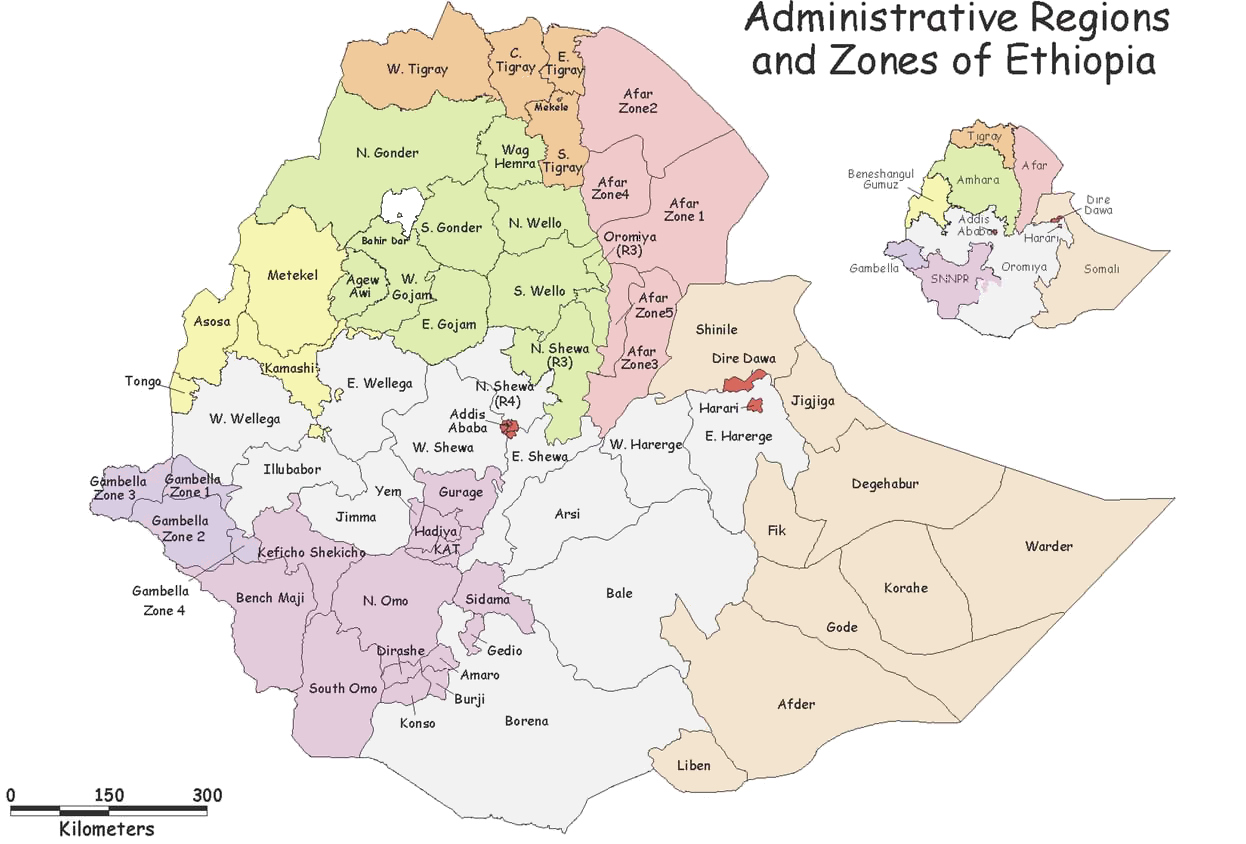
A 2000 map of the regions and zones of Ethiopia showing Keficho Shekicho in the SNNPR

A map of the regions and zones of Ethiopia showing the current SNNPR zones

Keficho Shekicho was a zone in the Southern Nations, Nationalities, and Peoples' Region of Ethiopia. A 1997 Situation Report by the United Nations Development Programme/Emergencies Unit for Ethiopia states that originally Kaffa and Sheka were separate zones, but were combined in early 1996. Keficho Shekicho was later separated for Keffa and Sheka Zones.

Keficho Shekicho was bordered on the south by Debub Omo, on the southwest by Bench Maji, on the west and north by the Oromia Region, and on the east by Semien Omo. The administrative center of Keficho Shekicho was Bonga; other towns included Tepi.

The CSA reported that 10,352 tons of coffee were produced in Keficho Shekicho in the year ending in 2005, based on inspection records from the Ethiopian Coffee and Tea authority. This represents 10.3% of the SNNPR's output and 4.6% of Ethiopia's total output.

== Demographics ==
Based on figures from the CSA, in 2005 this zone has an estimated total population of 1,044,033, of which 514,498 are men and 529,535 women; 101,639 or 9.7% of its population are urban dwellers. With an estimated area of 12,739.25 square kilometers, Keficho Shekicho has an estimated population density of 81.95 people per square kilometer.

In the 1994 Census, Keficho Shekicho had a population of 725,086 in 163,973 households, of whom 357,737 were men and 367,349 women; 56,090 or 7.74% of its population were urban dwellers. The five largest ethnic groups reported in this Zone were the Kafficho (71.77%), the Amhara (6.86%), the Mocha (6.36%), the Bench (5.11%), and the Oromo (4.85%); all other ethnic groups made up 5.05% of the population. Kafa is spoken as a first language by 71.34%, 7.63% speak Amharic, 6.62% Mocha, 5.13% Bench, and 4.55% speak Oromiffa; the remaining 4.73% spoke all other primary languages reported.

According to a May 24, 2004 World Bank memorandum, 2% of the inhabitants of Keficho Shekicho have access to electricity, this zone has a road density of 38.4 kilometers per 1000 square kilometers (compared to the national average of 30 kilometers), the average rural household has 0.7 hectare of land (compared to the national average of 1.01 hectare of land and an average of 0.89 for the SNNPR) the equivalent of 0.4 heads of livestock. 17.1% of the population is in non-farm related jobs, compared to the national average of 25% and a Regional average of 32%. 72% of all eligible children are enrolled in primary school, and 13% in secondary schools. 34% of the zone is exposed to malaria, and 58% to Tsetse fly. The memorandum gave this zone a drought risk rating of 324.

== Woredas ==
- Keffa Sub-Zone
  - Chena (woreda)
  - Decha
  - Gesha
  - Ginbo
  - Menjiwo
  - Telo
- Sheka Sub-Zone
  - Masha Anderacha
  - Yeki
