= Yeki =

District in Southern Nations, Nationalities, and Peoples' Region, Ethiopia

Coordinates: 7°15′N 35°25′E

Yeki is a woreda in South West Ethiopia Peoples' Region, Ethiopia. Part of the Sheka Zone, Yeki is bordered on the south by the Bench Maji Zone, on the west by the Gambela Region, on the north by Amderacha, and on the east by the Keffa Zone.The name 'Yeki' is named after the name of Sheko chief. The major town in Yeki is Tepi. Tepi is also named after the name of Majang man who live in the center of the current Tepi town.

The highest point in Yeki is Mount Teppi (2728 meters), a dormant volcano. Major rivers include the Beko and Shiy. Two varieties of subsistence agriculture are practiced in this woreda: one, in the northwestern corner, is based on growing cereals and enset; the other, in the rest of the woreda, is based on coffee and spices. Important cash crops in the first part include corn, teff, wheat, pulses, and enset; while in the second they are corn, sorghum, coffee, ginger and turmeric. Other important non-agricultural sources of income include selling milk. According to a 2004 report, Yeki had 76 kilometers of all-weather roads, for an average road density of 126 kilometers per 1000 square kilometers.

A 2002 United Nations Emergency Unit for Ethiopia assessment report mentions increasing conflict between the Majang and Sheko, which spilled over into neighboring Godere of the Gambela Region. The Majang and Sheko people claimed the ownership of the Yeki Woreda and they demanded to be granted political self-administration.

== Demographics ==
Based on the 2007 Census conducted by the CSA, this woreda has a total population of 134,519, of whom 68,895 are men and 65,624 women; 24,829 or 18.46% of its population are urban dwellers. The majority of the inhabitants practiced Ethiopian Orthodox Christianity, with 44.85% of the population reporting that belief, 29.8% were Protestants, 21.66% were Muslim, and 1.99% practiced traditional beliefs.

In the 1994 national census Yeki had a population of 85,699, of whom 44,004 were men and 41,695 women; 10,616 or 12.39% of its population were urban dwellers. The six largest ethnic groups reported in this woreda were the Kafficho (29.78%), the Amhara (29.48%), the Oromo (11.67%), the Shekkacho (7.45%), the Bench (7.33%), Sheko (7.26%) and the Majang(6.1%); all other ethnic groups made up 1.54% of the population. Amharic was spoken as a first language by 32.91% of the inhabitants, 28.48% spoke Kafa, 11.36% Oromiffa, 7.55% Sheki-noono, 7.17% Sheko, and 6.84% spoke Bench; the remaining 5.69% spoke all other primary languages reported. Concerning education, 41.40% of the population were considered literate; 32.09% of children aged 7–12 were in primary school; 11.17% of the children aged 13–14 were in junior secondary school; and 6.78% of the inhabitants aged 15–18 were in senior secondary school. Concerning sanitary conditions, about 78.87% of the urban houses and 27.95% of all houses had access to safe drinking water at the time of the census, while about 77.26% of the urban and 38.24% of the total had toilet facilities.
