= Dizi =

Dizi may refer to:

- Dizi (instrument), a Chinese transverse flute
- Dizi (woreda), a district of Ethiopia
- Dizi people, an ethnic group in southern Ethiopia
  - Dizi language
- Dizi, Iran
- Abgoosht, a Persian dish
- Turkish television drama series (dizi meaning 'series' in Turkish)

== See also ==
- Dizhi (disambiguation)
- Dizy (disambiguation)
- Dizzy (disambiguation)
