= Sheka Zone =

Zone in the South West Region of Ethiopia

Sheka is a zone in the Southwest Ethiopia Regional State of Ethiopia. Sheka is bordered on the south by Bench Maji, on the west by the Gambela Region, on the north by the Oromia Region, and on the east by Keffa. The administrative center of Sheka is Tepi Sheka is the western part of former Keficho Shekicho Zone.

== Demographics ==
Based on the 2007 Census conducted by the CSA, this Zone has a total population of 199,314, of whom 101,059 are men and 98,255 women; 34,227 or 17.17% are urban inhabitants. The seven largest ethnic groups reported in this Zone were the Shakacho (32.41%), the Amhara (22.17%), the Kafficho (20.16%), the Oromo (7.39%), the Bench (5.23%), the Sheko (4.24%), and the Majang (1.73%); all other ethnic groups made up 6.67% of the population. Shakacho is spoken as a first language by 33.44%, 26.98% speak Amharic, 20.15% Kafa, 6.54% speak Oromo, 5.24% Bench, and 4.35% Sheko; the remaining 3.3% spoke all other primary languages reported. 39.93% were Protestants, 39.39% of the population said they practiced Ethiopian Orthodox Christianity, 15.09% were Muslim, and 3.51% practiced traditional beliefs.

== Woredas ==
Woredas of Sheka Zone include:

- Anderacha
- Masha
- Masha (town)
- Tepi (town)
- Yeki

Former woredas include:

- Masha Anderacha
