= Nayi language =

Omotic language spoken in Ethiopia

Nayi
- Native to: Ethiopia
- Native speakers: 7,200 (2007 census)
- Language family: Afro-Asiatic: Omotic; North; Dizoid; Nayi

Language codes
- ISO 639-3: noz
- Glottolog: nayi1243
- ELP: Nayi

Nayi (also known as "Nao") is an Omotic language of the Afro-Asiatic language family spoken in western Ethiopia. Most of the speakers of the language live in two separated areas. The largest grouping live in Decha woreda of the Keffa Zone. The nearest city to their region is Bonga. A few in Dulkuma village of the Shoa Bench woreda, some in Sheko woreda having moved there in 1976-1977 as a result of conflicts between local feudal lords and the military government (Aklilu 2002:4). In Decha, young people no longer speak the language.

The language is notable for its retroflex consonants (Aklilu Yilma 1988), a striking feature shared with closely related Dizi, Sheko and nearby (but not closely related) Bench. The language has 5 vowels that can be long or short. The question of the status of a short mid central vowel is still unresolved. There are three phonemic tones and syllabic nasal consonants. There are ejective stops and affricates, but no implosives (Aklilu 2002:6,7).

Nayi, together with the Dizi and Sheko languages, is part of a cluster of languages variously called "Maji" or "Dizoid"

Andualem Adal Tessema said that according to Aklilu (1990), Naayì has twenty nine consonant phonemes and two Syllabic nasals n and m which carry tone. It is also indicated that consonant gemination is phonemic in Naayì and the language has three tonemes: high, mid and low. Regarding the vowel phonemes, Naayì has six short vowel phonemes i, e, ä, a, u, o and five long vowel phonemes i:, e:, a:, u:, o:. He remarks that the status of the short vowel ä in Naayì needs further investigations; and its long counterpart is not found in the language.
