= Gimira =

Gimira may refer to:

- Gimira people, an Omotic-speaking people in southwestern Ethiopia
- Gimira language, Omotic language spoken by the Gimira people
