= Bero (woreda) =

Bero is one of the districts in the South West Ethiopia Peoples' Region of Ethiopia. It is a part of the Bench Maji Zone. The district is bordered on the south by Surma, on the west by the Gambela Region, on the north by Guraferda, on the northeast by Meinit Shasha, and on the east by Maji. Bero was separated from Maji woreda. The seat of Bero district is Jeba town.

== Demographics ==
Based on the 2007 Census conducted by the CSA, this woreda has a total population of 12,256, of whom 6,679 are men and 5,577 women; 1,858 or 15.16% of its population are urban dwellers. The majority of the inhabitants practiced traditional beliefs, with 48.87% of the population reporting that belief, 38.73% practiced Ethiopian Orthodox Christianity, 8.81% were Muslim, and 2.28% were Protestants.
