= Maji, Ethiopia =

Maji ማጂ
- Location within Ethiopia
- Coordinates: 6°12′N 35°35′E
- Country: Ethiopia
- Region: South West Ethiopia Peoples' Region
- Zone: West Omo Zone
- Woreda: Maji (woreda)

Population (2005)
  - Total: 2,930
- Time zone: UTC+3 (EAT)
  - Summer (DST): UTC+3 (not observed)
- Climate: Cfb

Maji (Amharic: ማጂ) (also Machi) is a town in south western Ethiopia. It is located on the Boma Plateau, lying in the West Omo Zone of the South West Ethiopia Peoples' Region, and has a longitude and latitude of 6°12′N 35°35′E with an elevation variously given as 2,104, 2,258 and 2,430 meters above sea level. The town is the administrative center for the Maji woreda.

Postal service in Maji started at some time between 1923 and 1932. From the 1930s the town had a customs post and a telephone station. The town is served by Tum Airport (ICAO code HAMJ).

== History ==
In the territory of the Dizi Chiefdoms, Maji was founded around 1897 when Ras Welde Giyorgis stationed a garrison outpost of Ethiopian soldiers near the lands of the ture, a personage Garretson describes as "the most powerful and respected religious figure in the area." Garretson explains how an administrative center for the region soon followed: "Built on a commanding hill were a fortified encampment of gibbi (the personal headquarters of the governor), a church and a market. All were carefully observed and guarded by the governor and his retinue of soldiers." Richard Pankhurst records that its governor, Dejazmach Taye, amazed by the growing trade at Gambela to the west of him, during the 1920s attempted to develop exports of coffee, rubber, hides and ivory through the port town.

Prior to the Italian occupation, the British had a consulate in Maji. The town was occupied by the Italians 18 March 1937, and liberated from them by May 1941. During this period, the occupiers built roads so that vehicles could be driven to Maji and a Catholic Mission operated there which ran at least one school. An American Mission was established in 1948 near Maji, and provided education and medical care until it was closed in 1977.

When the Maji Zone was created in the mid-1990s, Maji became its administrative center.

== Demographics ==
Based on figures from the Central Statistical Agency, in 2005 Maji has an estimated total population of 2,930 of whom 1,302 were males and 1,628 were females. The 1994 national census reported this town had a total population of 1,617 of whom 721 were males and 896 were females.
