= Tsegaye Mamo =

Ethiopian politician

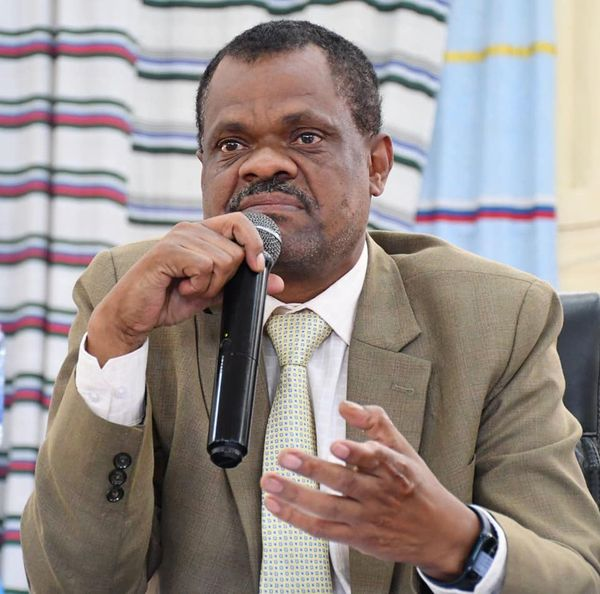
- Mamo in 2022
- Born: Mizan Teferi, Ethiopia
- Occupation: Prosperity Party of South West Ethiopia Peoples' Region

Tsegaye Mamo (English: Tsegaye Mamo, Amharic: ፀጋዬ ማሞ) is an Ethiopian politician who has been serving as Prosperity Party of South West Ethiopia Peoples' Region 2021.

Mamo served in the House of Federation in 2011.
