= Meinit Shasha =

Meinit Shasha is one of the woredas in the South West Ethiopia Peoples' Region of Ethiopia. Part of the Bench Maji Zone, Meinit Shasha is bordered on the south by Maji, on the southwest by Bero, on the west by Guraferda, on the north by Debub Bench and Meinit Goldiya, on the east by the Keffa Zone, and on the southeast by the Omo River which separates it from the Debub Omo Zone. Towns in Meinit Shasha include Jemu. Meinit Shasha was part of former Meinit woreda.

The part of this woreda which lies within 15 kilometers of the Omo is included in the Omo National Park.

== Demographics ==
Based on the 2007 Census conducted by the CSA, this woreda has a total population of 43,305, of whom 21,730 are men and 21,575 women; 2,779 or 2.42% of its population are urban dwellers. The majority of the inhabitants practiced traditional beliefs, with 71.4% of the population reporting that belief, 21.83% were Protestants, and 5.13% practiced Ethiopian Orthodox Christianity. It is the homeland of Me'en people.
