= Tum, Ethiopia =

Tum
- Location within Ethiopia
- Country: Ethiopia
- Region: South West Ethiopia Peoples' Region
- Zone: West Omo Zone
- Woreda: Maji
- Time zone: UTC+3 (EAT)
  - Summer (DST): UTC+3 (not observed)
- Climate: Cfb

Tum is a village in southwestern Ethiopia.

It was the former administrative centre for the Maji region and contains a small airport with a grass runway which is an important transport link for the area. In 2000, the population was estimated at 1,200.

== See also ==
- Tum Airport
