= Semien Bench =

District in South West Ethiopia People's Region, Ethiopia

Semien Bench is a woreda in South West Ethiopia Peoples' Region, Ethiopia. It is named for the Bench people. Part of the Bench Maji Zone, Semien Bench is bordered on the southwest by Debub Bench, on the west by Sheko, on the northwest by the Sheka Zone, on the east by the Keffa Zone, and on the southeast by She Bench. Semien Bench is part of former Bench woreda.

== Demographics ==
Based on the 2007 Census conducted by the CSA, this woreda has a total population of 106,490, of whom 51,993 are men and 54,497 women; 5,331 or 5.01% of its population are urban dwellers. The majority of the inhabitants were Protestants, with 64.28% of the population reporting that belief, 19.29% practiced traditional beliefs, and 6.58% practiced Ethiopian Orthodox Christianity.
