= Sheko =

Sheko may refer to:

- Sheko language, Omotic language spoken by the Sheko people
- Sheko (woreda), Southern Nations, Nationalities and Peoples' Region, Ethiopia
- Shek O, village in Southern District, Hong Kong
