= Masha (woreda) =

Woreda in the Sheka Zone in Ethiopia

Coordinates: 7.75000°N 35.46667°E

Masha is one of the woredas in the South West Ethiopia Peoples' Region of Ethiopia. Part of the Sheka Zone, Masha is bordered on the south by Anderacha, on the west and north by the Oromia Region, and on the east by the Keffa Zone. Towns in Masha include Masha. Masha was part of former Masha Anderacha woreda.

== Demographics ==
Based on the 2007 Census conducted by the CSA, this woreda has a total population of 40,810, of whom 20,116 are men and 20,694 women; 6,787 or 16.63% of its population are urban dwellers. The majority of the inhabitants were Protestants, with 56.5% of the population reporting that belief, 32.82% practiced Ethiopian Orthodox Christianity, 7.15% practiced traditional beliefs, and 1.56% were Muslim.
