= Ralph de Diceto =

12th-century English clergyman and chronicler

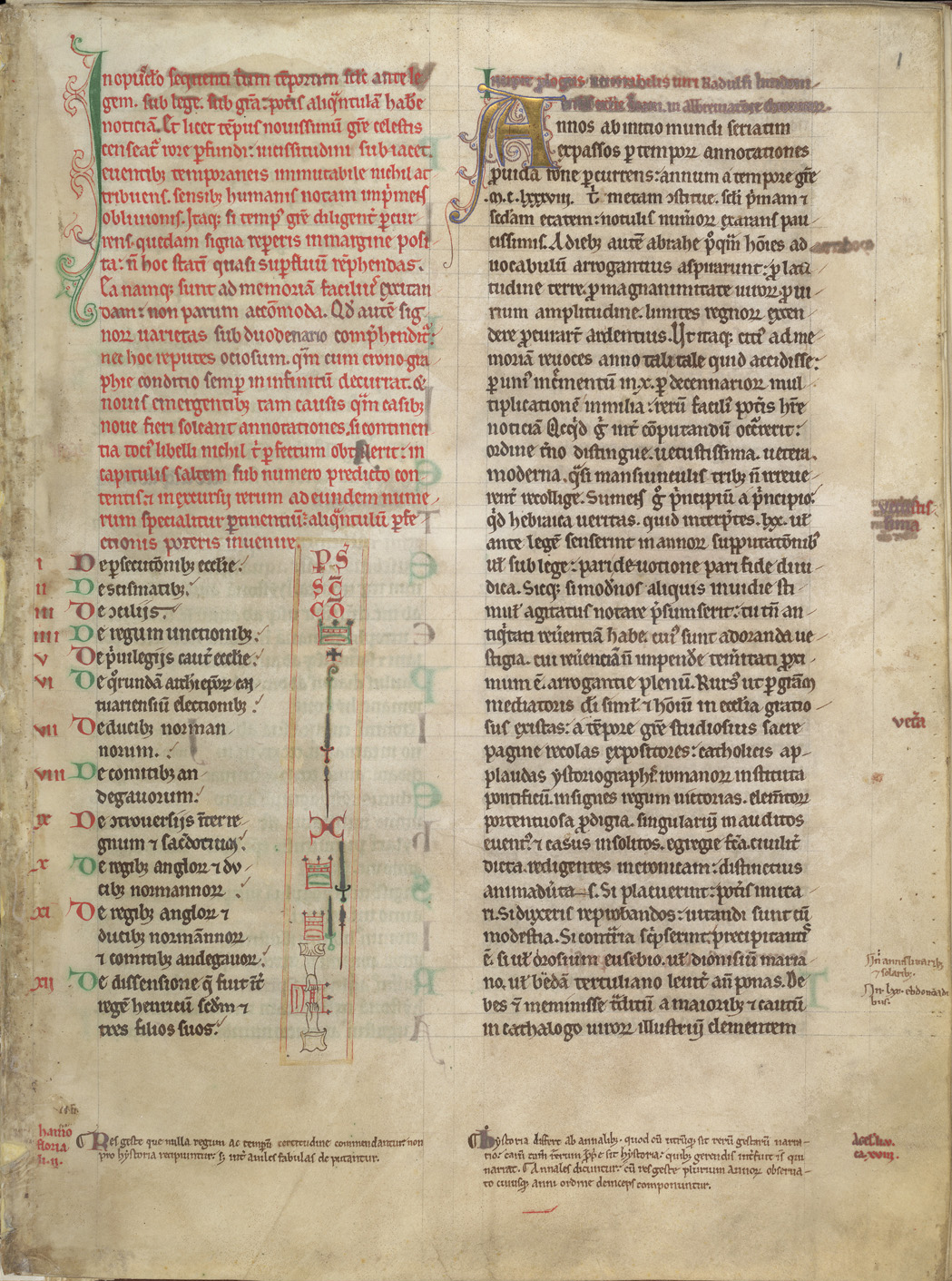
Opening page from the St Alban's Abbey copy of Ralph's Abbreviationes Chronicorum and Ymagines Historiarum, featuring a table of the innovative marginal signs he introduced to help index his work

Ralph de Diceto or Ralph of Diss (Latin: Radulfus de Diceto; c. 1120 – c. 1202) was archdeacon of Middlesex, dean of St Paul's Cathedral (from c. 1180), and the author of a major chronicle divided into two parts—often treated as separate works—the Abbreviationes Chronicorum (Latin for "Abbreviations of Chronicles") from the birth of Jesus to the 1140s and the Imagines or Ymagines Historiarum ("Images of Histories") from that point until 1202.

== Life ==
Ralph is first mentioned in 1152, when he received the archdeaconry of Middlesex in London. He was probably born between 1120 and 1130. Of his parentage and nationality, we know nothing. The common statement that he derived his surname from Diss in Norfolk is a mere conjecture. Dicetum may equally well be a Latinized form of Dissay, Dicy, or Dizy, place names in Maine, Picardy, Burgundy, and Champagne.

In 1152, Ralph was already a Master of Arts and, presumably, had studied at Paris. His reputation for learning and integrity stood high. He was regarded with respect and favour by Arnulf of Lisieux and Gilbert Foliot, two of the most eminent bishops of their time. Quite naturally, the archdeacon assumed the same side on the Becket controversy—that of King Henry II—as did his friends.

By 1164, Ralph had acquired the livings of Aynho in Northamptonshire and Finchingfield in Essex, serving them both by vicars.

Although Ralph's narrative is colourless and although he was one of those who showed some sympathy for Becket at the Council of Northampton in 1164, his correspondence shows that he regarded the archbishop's conduct as ill-considered and that he gave advice to those whom Becket regarded as his chief enemies.

The natural impartiality of his intellect was accentuated by a certain timidity, which is apparent in his writings no less than in his life. Apart from his selection in 1166 as the envoy of the English bishops when they protested against the excommunications launched by Becket, which he characteristically neglects to record, he remained in the background.

About 1180, Ralph became dean of St Paul's. In this office, he distinguished himself by carefully managing its estates, by restoring the discipline of its chapter, and by building a deanery house at his own expense. A scholar and a man of considerable erudition, he evinced a strong preference for historical studies. About the time he was preferred to the deanery, he began to collect materials for the history of his own times.

Ralph's friendships with Richard FitzNeal, who succeeded Gilbert Foliot in the see of London; with William Longchamp, the chancellor of King Richard I; and with Walter de Coutances, the archbishop of Rouen in Normandy, gave him excellent opportunities of collecting information.

== Works ==
Ralph of Diceto's Chronicle covers the history of the world from the birth of Jesus to the year 1202. It is divided into two parts, often treated as separate works: the Abbreviationes Chronicorum ("Abbreviations of Chronicles") up to around 1147 and the Imagines or Ymagines Historiarum ("Images of Histories") from then until 1202.

The former is a work of learning and industry but is almost entirely based upon extant sources. The latter, beginning as a compilation from Robert de Monte and the letters of Bishop Foliot, becomes an original authority c. 1172 and a contemporary record c. 1181. In precision and fullness of detail, however, the Ymagines are inferior to the chronicles of Roger of Howden. (Note: Roger's two Gesta were formerly attributed to Benedictus Abbas.) Ralph is careless in his chronology. The documents which he incorporates, while often important, are selected on no overarching principle. He has little sense of style but displays considerable insight when he ventures to discuss a political situation. For this reason and on account of the details with which they supplement the more important chronicles of the period, the Ymagines are a valuable (though secondary) source.

== Editions ==
- Stubbs, William, ed. (1876), Radulfi de Diceto Decani Lundoniensis Opera Historica [The Historical Works of Master Ralph de Diceto, Dean of London], Rolls Series, Vol. 68 (in Latin). The first volume (Google Books) contains an introduction, the Abbreviationes, the Capitula Ymaginum Historiarum ("Summary of the Images of History"), and the first part of the Ymagines itself. The second volume (Internet Archive) contains the Ymagines from 1180–1202 and minor works, compendia of facts taken from well-known sources.
- Hale, William Hale Hale, ed. (1858), The Domesday of St Pauls, Camden Society, pp. 109 ff. This covers Diceto's fragmentary domesday of the deanery's estates.
