= Bench Sheko =

Zone in the South West Ethiopia Region

Coordinates: 6°15′N 35°10′E

Map of the regions and zones of Ethiopia

Bench Sheko (previously known as Bench Maji) is a zone in the South West Ethiopia Peoples' Region of Ethiopia. Bench Sheko is bordered on the south and southeast by West Omo, on the west by the Gambela Region on the north by Sheka, and on the east by Keffa. The administrative center of Bench Sheko is Mizan Teferi.

== Overview ==
Bench Sheko has 142 kilometers of dry-weather roads, for an average road density of 22 kilometers per 1000 square kilometers. The highest point in this Zone is Mount Guraferda (2494 meters). The Omo National Park is located on the western bank of the Omo River.

The main food crops in this Zone include maize, godere (taro root), and enset, while sorghum, teff, wheat and barley are cultivated to a significant extent. Although cattle, shoats and poultry are produced in limited numbers, meat and milk are very much appreciated. Cash crops include fruits (bananas, pineapples, oranges) and spices (e.g. coriander and ginger); honey is also an important local source of income. However, coffee is the primary cash crop. The Central Statistical Agency (CSA) reported that 10,097 tons of coffee were produced in Bench Sheko in the year ending in 2005, based on inspection records from the Ethiopian Coffee and Tea authority. This represents 10.6% of the SNNPR's output and 4.4% of Ethiopia's total output.

== Demographics ==
Based on the 2007 Census conducted by the CSA, this Zone has a total population of 652,531, of whom 323,348 are men and 329,183 women; with an area of 19,252.00 square kilometers, Bench Sheko has a population density of 33.89. While 75,241 or 11.53% are urban inhabitants, a further 398 or 0.06% are pastoralists. A total of 157,598 households were counted in this Zone, which results in an average of 4.14 persons to a household, and 151,940 housing units. The seven largest ethnic groups reported in this Zone were the Bench (55.11%), the Me'en (21.36%), the Amhara (5.23%), the Kafficho (2.55%), the Dizi (5.17%), the Sheko (4.21%), and the Suri (3.88%); all other ethnic groups made up 5.49% of the population. Bench is spoken as a first language by 54.54%, 21.36% spoke Me'en, 12.5% Amharic, 5.09% Dizin, 5.03% spoke Kafa, 4.31% spoke Sheko, and 3.88% Suri; the remaining 3.29% spoke all other primary languages reported. 49.27% were Protestants, 18.12% of the population said they practiced Ethiopian Orthodox Christianity, 26.34% practiced traditional beliefs, and 3.47% were Muslim.

In the 1994 Census, Bench Sheko had a population of 325,878 in 85,236 households, of whom 163,339 were men and 162,539 women; 23,502 or 7.21% of its population were urban dwellers. (This total also includes an estimate for the inhabitants of 7 rural kebeles, which were not counted; they were estimated to have 3,458 inhabitants, of whom 2,582 were men and 876 women.) The six largest ethnic groups reported in this Zone were the Bench (42.04%), the Me'en (15.6%), the Kafficho (7.92%), the Amhara (6.95%), the Dizi (6.46%), and the Suri (6%); all other ethnic groups made up 15.03% of the population. Bench is spoken as a first language by 42.1%, 15.55% spoke Me'en, 11.52% Amharic, 6.3% Dizin, 6% Suri, and 5.93% spoke Kafa; the remaining 12.6% spoke all other primary languages reported.

According to a May 24, 2004 World Bank memorandum, 7% of the inhabitants of Bench Sheko have access to electricity, this zone has a road density of 15.5 kilometers per 1000 square kilometers (compared to the national average of 30 kilometers), the average rural household has 0.3 hectare of land (compared to the national average of 1.01 hectare of land and an average of 0.89 for the SNNPR) the equivalent of 0.5 heads of livestock. 15.7% of the population is in non-farm related jobs, compared to the national average of 25% and a Regional average of 32%. 81% of all eligible children are enrolled in primary school, and 12% in secondary schools. 44% of the zone is exposed to malaria, and 54% to tsetse fly. The memorandum gave this zone a drought risk rating of 303.

== Woredas ==
Current woredas of Bench Shako Zone are:

- Bero
- Debub Bench
- Guraferda
- Meinit Goldiya
- Meinit Shasha
- Mizan Aman Town
- Semien Bench
- She Bench
- Sheko

Former woredas are:

- Bench
- Meinit
