= She Bench =

Ethiopian woreda

SheyBench is one of the woredas in the South West Ethiopia Peoples' Region of Ethiopia. It is named after the subgroup of Bench people. Part of the Bench Maji Zone, She Bench is bordered on the east and south by Meinit Goldiya, on the west by Debub Bench, on the northwest by Semien Bench, and on the north by the Keffa Zone. Shey Bench is part of former Bench woreda. The capital town of Shey Bench woreda is Siz town.

== Demographics ==
Based on the 2007 Census conducted by the CSA, this woreda has a total population of 118,282, of whom 56,541 are men and 61,741 women; 4,415 or 3.73% of its population are urban dwellers. The majority of the inhabitants were Protestants, with 58.75% of the population reporting that belief, 31.1% practiced traditional beliefs, and 8.36% practiced Ethiopian Orthodox Christianity.
