= Debub Bench =

Coordinates: 6°50′N 35°30′E

Debub Bench is one of the woredas in the South West Ethiopia Peoples' Region of Ethiopia. It is named for the Bench people. Part of the Bench Maji Zone, Debub Bench is bordered on the south by Meinit Shasha, on the west by Guraferda, on the north by Sheko, on the northeast by Semien Bench, on the east by She Bench, and on the southeast by Meinit Goldiya. Town of Mizan Aman is surrounded by Debub Bench. Debub Bench is part of former Bench woreda.

Rivers in Debub Bench include the Akobo, which has its source in this woreda.

== Demographics ==
Based on the 2007 Census conducted by the CSA, this woreda has a total population of 108,299, of whom 53,149 are men and 55,150 women; 8,662 or 8% of its population are urban dwellers. The majority of the inhabitants were Protestants, with 58.07% of the population reporting that belief, 19.01% practiced Ethiopian Orthodox Christianity, 15.94% practiced traditional beliefs, and 4.12% were Muslim.
