= Jemu =

Town in Ethiopia

- Town
- Location within Ethiopia
- Coordinates: 6°38′24″N 35°46′58″E
- Country: Ethiopia
- Region: South West Ethiopia Peoples' Region
- Zone: West Omo Zone

Government
  - Mayor: Ashenafi Tesfaye
- Elevation: 1,500 m (4,900 ft)
- Time zone: UTC+3 (East Africa Time)

Jemu is town and separate district in southwestern Ethiopia. Jemu serves as the administrative seat of West Omo Zone and Meinit Shasha district of Southwestern Ethiopia Regional State. The town is located at 6° 38′ 24″ N, 35° 46′ 58″ E, and its altitude is 1,500 meters above sea level.Jemu is a home of Me'en people and located in 662 km southwest from Addis Ababa.

== Infrastructures ==
Jemu has infrastructures as paved roads and electric service, public market services, hotels and restaurant services, banks and telecommunication services.
