= Guraferda =

Woredas in the South West Ethiopia People's Region of Ethiopia

Guraferda is one of the woredas in the South West Ethiopia Peoples' Region of Ethiopia. Part of the Bench Maji Zone, Guraferda is bordered on the south by Bero, on the west and north by the Gambela Region, on the northeast by Sheko, on the east by Debub Bench, and on the southeast by Meinit Shasha. Towns in Guraferda include Guraferda. Guraferda was separated from Sheko woreda.

== Demographics ==
Based on the 2007 Census conducted by the CSA, this woreda has a total population of 35,271, of whom 19,410 are men and 15,861 women; 4,991 or 14.15% of its population are urban dwellers. The majority of the inhabitants practiced Ethiopian Orthodox Christianity, with 53.23% of the population reporting that belief, 28.82% were Protestants, 13.87% were Muslim, and 2.9% practiced traditional beliefs.
