= Vijay Kumar Roy =

- Born: Bihar, India
- Occupation: Academic

Vijay Kumar Roy is an academic, poet and editor from Bihar, India. Presently, he is working as an assistant professor of English at Northern Border University, Saudi Arabia

== Bio ==
He earned his doctorate degree in English from Lalit Narayan Mithila University (LNMU), Darbhanga, Bihar, India.

== Career ==
He started his career in 2008 as an Assistant Professor of English at SRM Institute of Science and Technology. Before working at Northern Border University, Arar, Kingdom of Saudi Arabia, he taught at Mizan–Tepi University, Ethiopia, and Shri Venkateshwara University.

== Published books ==
- Women’s Voice in Indian Fiction in English. New Delhi: Adhyayan Publishers, 2011. (ISBN 978-81-8435-275-7)
- Comparative Literature: Critical Responses. New Delhi: Alfa Publications, 2014. (ISBN 978-93-83292-41-7)
- Contemporary Indian Spiritual Poetry in English: Critical Explorations. New Delhi: Alfa Publications, 2012. (ISBN 978-93-81465-69-1)
- Teaching of English: New Dimensions. New Delhi: Alfa Publications, 2012. (ISBN 978-93-81465-52-3)
- Indian Poetry in English: A Comprehensive Study. New Delhi: Adhyayan Publishers, 2011. (ISBN 978-81-8435-277-1)
- Realm of Beauty and Truth: A Collection of Poems. New Delhi: Authorspress, 2016. (ISBN 978-93-5207-250-7)
- Aesthetic of John Keats: An Indian Approach. New Delhi: Adhyayan Publishers, 2010. (ISBN 978-81-8435-202-3)
- Value Education and Professional Ethics: An Anthology. New Delhi: Jnanada Prakashan, 2013. (ISBN 978-81-7139-555-2)
- Humanities and Social Sciences: The Quintessence of Education. New Delhi: Arise Publishers, 2012. (ISBN 978-93-81031-98-8)
- K. Sekhar’s Hindi - Speak with the Hearts of Indians. Addis Ababa, Ethiopia: Littmann Book, 2013. (ISBN 978-99944-880-4-9)
- English Language Teaching: New Approaches and Methods. New Delhi: APH Publishing Corporation, 2013. (ISBN 978-93-313-1998-2)
- The Melodies of Immortality (An Anthology of Poetry). New Delhi: Alfa Publications, 2012. (ISBN 978-93-81465-78-3)
- Spiritual Poetry of India in English Translation. New Delhi: Alfa Publications, 2012. (ISBN 978-93-8146-577-6)
- Premanjali. New Delhi: Adhyayan Publishers, 2009 (2nd ed. 2012). (ISBN 978-81-8435-141-5)
- The Social, Cultural and Spiritual Dimensions of Modern Indian Poetry in English. Newcastle, United Kingdom: Cambridge Scholars Publishing, 2017. (ISBN 978-1-4438-7968-2)
- Post-Independence Indian Poetry in English: New Experimentation. New Delhi: Alfa Publications, 2015. (ISBN 978-93-83292-36-3)
- Contemporary Indian Fiction in English: Critical Studies. New Delhi: Alfa Publications, 2013. (ISBN 978-93-82302-98-8)
