= Meinit Goldiya =

Meinit Goldiya is one of the woredas in the South West Ethiopia Peoples' Region of Ethiopia. Part of the Bench Maji Zone, Meinit Goldiya is bordered on the south by Meinit Shasha, on the west by Debub Bench, on the northwest by She Bench, and on the north and east by the Keffa Zone. Towns in Meinit Goldiya include Bachuma. Meinit Goldiya was part of former Meinit woreda, southern part of Bench woreda was added to Meinit Goldiya.

== Demographics ==
Based on the 2007 Census conducted by the CSA, this woreda has a total population of 88,863, of whom 43,594 are men and 45,269 women; 2,547 or 2.87% of its population are urban dwellers. The majority of the inhabitants were Protestants, with 65.08% of the population reporting that belief, 27.41% practiced traditional beliefs, and 6.37% practiced Ethiopian Orthodox Christianity. It is the homeland of Me'en people.
