= Tum Airport =

Airport in Tum, Ethiopia

Tum Airport Maji Airport
- IATA: TUJ; ICAO: HAMJ

Summary
- Airport type: Public
- Operator: Ethiopian Civil Aviation Authority
- Serves: Maji, Ethiopia
- Location: Tum
- Elevation AMSL: 4,650 ft / 1,417 m
- Coordinates: 6°15′35″N 35°31′10″E

Map
- Location of the airport in Ethiopia

Runways
Direction	Length		Surface
Direction	m	ft	Surface
12/30	930	3,051	Grass
- Source: Google Maps SkyVector

Tum Airport (IATA: TUJ, ICAO: HAMJ) is a public airport in southwestern Ethiopia. Located at an elevation of 4,650 feet above sea level, the airport serves the villages of Tum and Maji, the administrative center of the Maji District. The airport was formerly served by Ethiopian Airlines.

Maji sits atop a ridge on the Boma Plateau, more than 3,000 feet (910 m) above the airport at Tum. The plateau runs west through southeast of the airport. The runway slopes uphill to the southeast.

== Airlines and destinations ==
As of March 2025, there are no airlines that serve this airport. Ethiopian Airlines served this airport for an unknown time.

== See also ==
- Transport in Ethiopia
- List of airports in Ethiopia
