= Wondimu Kurta =

Ethiopian politician

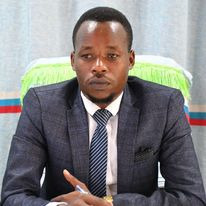
- Born: Sheko, Ethiopia
- Occupation: Politician
- Title: Speaker of South West Ethiopia Peoples' Region

Wondimu Kurta (Amharic: ወንድሙ ኩርታ) is an Ethiopian politician who has been serving as speaker of South West Ethiopia Peoples' Region since 2021.
