= Anderacha (woreda) =

Coordinates: 7°34′N 35°24′E

Anderacha is one of the woredas in the South West Ethiopia Peoples' Region of Ethiopia. Part of the Sheka Zone, Anderacha is bordered on the south by Yeki, on the southwest by the Gambela Region, on the northwest by the Oromia Region, on the north by Masha, and on the east by the Keffa Zone. Towns in Anderacha include Gecha. Anderacha was part of former Masha Anderacha woreda.

== Demographics ==
Based on the 2007 Census conducted by the CSA, this woreda has a total population of 23,985, of whom 12,048 are men and 11,937 women; 2,611 or 10.89% of its population are urban dwellers. The majority of the inhabitants were Protestants, with 68.55% of the population reporting that belief, 19.96% practiced Ethiopian Orthodox Christianity, 5.83% practiced traditional beliefs, and 1.21% were Muslim.
