= Masha Anderacha =

Town in Ethiopia

Coordinates: 7°35′N 35°25′E

Masha Anderacha was one of the 77 woredas in the Southern Nations, Nationalities, and Peoples' Region of Ethiopia. Part of the Keficho Shekicho Zone, Masha Anderacha was bordered on the south by Yeki, on the west and north by the Oromia Region, and on the east by Gesha. Towns in Masha Anderacha included Gecha and Masha. Masha Anderacha was separated for Anderacha and Masha woredas.

This woreda is notable for its relatively high forest cover as compared to other parts of Ethiopia, accounting in 2001 for about 56% of the country's total forested area; this woodland is primarily governed by a form of tenure known as Kobo, which promotes the existence of woodland for hunting and beekeeping. However this resource is threatened by the growth of tea and coffee plantations. Important cash crops include corn, teff, wheat, pulses and enset.

== History ==
In September 2003, cadres of the Ethiopian People's Revolutionary Democratic Front (EPRDF) threatened to take away the land in the woreda occupied by eight farmers, who were supporters of the United Ethiopia Democratic Party (UEDP). The EPRDF cadres told the farmers that opposition party members were not entitled to land and demanded that they cease their support for the UEDP. When the farmers refused to comply with this demand, they were evicted from their land. The following month, two teachers were fired for being members of UEDP.

Masha Anderacha was selected by the Ministry of Agriculture and Rural Development in 2004 as one of several woredas for voluntary resettlement for farmers from overpopulated areas, becoming the new home for a total of 512 heads of households and 2048 total family members.

== Demographics ==
Based on figures published by the Central Statistical Agency in 2005, this woreda has an estimated total population of 67,972, of whom 35,276 are men and 32,696 are women; 13,210 or 19.43% of its population are urban dwellers, which is greater than the Zone average of 9.7%. With an estimated area of 1,524.69 square kilometers, Masha Anderacha has an estimated population density of 44.6 people per square kilometer, which is less than the Zone average of 81.9.

In the 1994 national census Masha Anderacha had a population of 46,165, of whom 22,214 were men and 23,951 women; 7,290 or 15.79% of its population were urban dwellers. The five largest ethnic groups reported in this woreda were the Mocha (85.3%), the Oromo (5.63%), the Amhara (3.78%), the Kafficho (3.37%), and the Sheko (0.93%); all other ethnic groups made up 0.99% of the population. Mocha was spoken as a first language by 89.24% of the inhabitants, 5.2% spoke Oromo, 2.68% Amharic, 1.51% Kafa, and 0.93% spoke Sheko; the remaining 0.44% spoke all other primary languages reported. Concerning education, 43.65% of the population were considered literate; 33.59% of children aged 7–12 were in primary school; 15.31% of the children aged 13–14 were in junior secondary school; and 12.50% of the inhabitants aged 15–18 were in senior secondary school. Concerning sanitary conditions, about 40.96% of the urban houses and 7.63% of all houses had access to safe drinking water at the time of the census, while about 33.58% of the urban and 7.84% of the total had toilet facilities.
