= Dizzy (nickname) =

Dizzy is a nickname, Notable people with the nickname include:

- Hubert Raymond Allen (1919–1987), British Second World War Royal Air Force pilot and writer
- Dizzy Dean (1910–1974), Major League Baseball pitcher
- Dizzy Dismukes (1890–1961), American pitcher and manager in Negro league baseball and during the pre-Negro league years
- Benjamin Disraeli (1804–1881), British Prime Minister
- Dizzy Gillespie (1917–1993), American jazz trumpet player and composer
- Jason Gillespie (born 1975), Australian former cricketer
- Johnny Moore (trumpeter) (1938–2008), Jamaican trumpet player
- Dizzy Nutter (1893–1958), American baseball player
- Dizzy Reece (born 1931), jazz trumpeter
- Dizzy Reed (born 1963), Guns N' Roses keyboardist
- Dizzy Trout (1915–1972), Major League Baseball pitcher

== See also ==
- Dizzy (disambiguation)
- Dizzee Rascal, British rapper
