= Dizi Chiefdoms =

Socio-political chieftainships in Ethiopia

The Dizi Chiefdoms were a socio-political and spiritual division of 19 independent, hierarchically organized chiefdoms historically occupied by the Dizi people in the mountainous Maji district of what is now southwestern Ethiopia. Each chiefdom was ruled by its own hereditary chief, and no single king or paramount ruler held authority over the Dizi as a whole.

== Division ==
According to the German ethnologist Eugen Haberland, as recorded by the anthropologist Akira Deguchi, the Dizi were "divided into over 20 chiefdoms, with shifting boundaries and allegiances," distributed from southeast to northwest as follows: Kolu, Adi, Muy, Tsiski, Maji (Kyerts, Gelkamo, Kuri), Wor, Say, Mash, Gobi, Aro, Duku, Dami, Kanta, Ezkolu, Kasi, Beru, Gay, Garo, Jabba, and Bay. Following the incorporation of the Dizi into the Ethiopian Empire under Menelik II in 1898, effective political and economic control of the area passed to the imperial administration, and the authority of the individual Dizi chiefs was reduced to a largely ceremonial and ritual role.

== Structure ==
Traditional Dizi political organization consisted of numerous small, territorially defined chiefdoms, each headed by a hereditary chief (rendered in Dizi as ''-iyasu'' or ''-kyam'' depending on the chiefdom). Some chiefdoms held independent ritual authority to control rainfall through sacrifice; others depended on the chief of a neighbouring, more senior chiefdom to perform this rite on their behalf. The table below, compiled from the fieldwork of Akira Deguchi, lists the chiefdoms recorded in the late twentieth century together with their chiefs and ritual standing.

Chiefdom	Chief	Independent rainfall-ritual power	Officiant when power was lacking
Kolu	Koluburzi	Yes	
Adikas	Adikiyasu	No	Chiskiyasu
Chiski	Chiskiyasu	Yes	
Gaaru (Keltskumbit)	Gaaruburzi	No	Chisukiyasu
Meshi	Meshikiyasu	Yes	
Meshi	Zenkiyasu	No	Meshikiyasu
Sai	Saikiyasu	Yes	
Dui	Duikiyasu	No	Saikiyasu
Gelkamo	Duuruna (a non-hereditary ruler who held the area by force of arms)	No	Woruburzi
Gelkamo	Dagburzi	No	Woruburzi
Gelkamo	Chobikiyasu	No	Woruburzi
Woru	Woruburzi	Yes	
Kelt	Keltkyam	No	Woruburzi
Gobi	Gobitiyaar	Yes	
Meru (of Gobi)	Merutiyaar	No	Gobitiyaar
Maji	Majigaju	No	Woruburzi
Kurit	Majikuri	No	Woruburzi
Kaaltsu	Kaaltsukyam	No	Woruburzi and Gobitiyaar
Aaro	Aaroburzi	Yes	
Dami	Damiburzi (Daamikaar)	Yes	
Duku (of Dami)	Dukuburzi	No	Damiburzi
Kanta	Kantaburzi	No	Damiburzi
Osklu	Oskluburzi	No	Damiburzi
Jaba	Jababurzi	Yes	
Kaishi (of Jaba)	Kaishiburzi	No	Jababurzi
Bay	Bayburzi	Yes	
Byero	Byeroburzi	Yes	
Mui	Muikyam (Muigajyu)	Not recorded	

== History ==
Archaeological evidence and oral history suggest Maji was an imperial garrison and province of the Ethiopian Empire in medieval times.
