= Dizoid languages =

Afro-Asiatic language group of Ethiopia

Dizoid
- Maji, Majoid
- Geographic distribution: Ethiopia
- Linguistic classification: Afro-Asiatic: Omotic; North?; Dizoid
- Proto-language: Proto-Maji
- Subdivisions: Dizi; Sheko; Nayi

Language codes
- Glottolog: dizo1235

The Dizoid or Maji (Majoid) languages consist of three languages spoken in southwestern Ethiopia:

- Dizi
- Sheko
- Nayi (Na'o)

Dizi differs from the rest of the languages somewhat more (Aklilu 2003), although Glottolog considers similarities between Sheko and Nayi to be due to retentions rather than evidence of subgrouping.

Güldemann (2018) accepts that Dizoid is more likely to be related to Ta-Ne ("North Omotic") than Mao and Aroid are, and observes loanword influence on Maji languages from the Gimira subgroup of Ta-Ne.

== Numerals ==
Comparison of numerals in individual languages:

Language	1	2	3	4	5	6	7	8	9	10
Dizi (Dizin)	kʼo᷆ːj	tʼàːɡŋ̩̄	kàːdū	kʼùbm̄	út͡ʃū	jàkū	tùːsū	ze᷆ːd	sāɡŋ̀	támū
Nayi (Na'o)	jísn̩	tʼaːɡn̩	kädú	kubḿ̩	útʃːú	jãkù	tuːsu	zìét	sáɡn̩	támmù
Sheko (1)	kʼòy	tʼaaɡn̩	kàdu	kúbm̩	ùtʃú	yakù	tubsu	zeed	saɡn̩	təɓi
Sheko (2)	kʼōy	tʼáaɡŋ́	káddú	kúbḿ	ʔűtʂű	yákú	túbsú	zēed	sāɡŋ̀	ta̋mű

== See also ==
- List of Proto-Maji reconstructions (Wiktionary)
