= Harari People's Democratic Party =

Political party in Ethiopia

The Harari People's Democratic Party (Amharic: የሐረሪ ሕዝብ ዴሞክራሲያዊ ፓረቲ) is a political party in the Harari Region, Ethiopia.
