= Aboker Muti =

Aboker Muti (Harari: አቦከር ሙጢ) is a kebele, a small town, in Harari Region, Ethiopia. It is a few km (2 or 3) from the city of Harar. As of the May 2007 Population and Housing Census, there were 6,268 people and 1,275 households in the town.

The road to Kombolcha, Oromia passes through Aboker Muti. The town is named after a mountain adjacent to the town. The town has elementary school to middle school running from grade 1 to grade 8.
