= Surma (woreda) =

District in South West Ethiopia People's Region, Ethiopia

Coordinates: 6°00′N 35°15′E

Suri woreda is a woreda found in Western Omo Zone, in the South Western Ethiopia Peoples' Regional state of Ethiopia. It is named for the Suri people, whose homeland lies largely in this woreda. Suri woreda is bordered on the south and west by South Sudan, on the northwest by the Gambela Region dimma woreda, on the north by Bero woreda, on the east by Maji woreda and on the southern part with the new pastoral zone South Omo Nyangatom woreda. A portion of the Omo National Park extends into the southern part of this woreda.

== Overview ==
The average elevation in this woreda is 2088 meters above sea level. Rivers include the Negi, Koka, tulge river, a tributary of the Akobo, which has its origins in this woreda. High points include Mt shologoy or (shulgara)(2560 meters) on the Ethiopian-South Sudanese border. According to a 2004 report, Suri woreda had 26 kilometers of dry-weather roads, for an average road density of 5 kilometers per 1000 square kilometers. This lack of roads means remote locations are accessible only by air. Only recently radio communication lines were made available in this woreda. As of 2008, about 30% of the total population of Suri has no access to drinking water and others social infrastructures .

== Demographics ==
The three largest ethnic groups reported in 1994 in the Suri woreda were the Suri people (93.79%), the Dizi (3.09%), and the Amhara (1.71%); others made up 1.41% of the population. The Suri language was spoken as a first language by 94.02% of the inhabitants; 2.9% spoke Dizin, and 2.01% spoke Amharic; the remaining 1.07% spoke other primary languages reported. Concerning education, 43.65% of the population were considered literate; 33.59% of children aged 7–12 were in primary school; 15.31% of the children aged 13–14 were in junior secondary school, and 12.5% of the inhabitants aged 15–18 were in senior secondary school. Concerning sanitary conditions, about 70% of the urban and 16% of the total had toilet facilities. Based on the (most recent) 2007 Population Census conducted by the CSA, the woreda had a total population of 24,598, of whom 11,794 were men and 12,804 women; 914 or 3.72% of its population were 'urban dwellers' (i.e., living in the small towns in the area. The majority of the inhabitants practice traditional beliefs, with 96.25% of the population reporting that belief, 1.63% practiced Ethiopian Orthodox Christianity, and 1.59% were Protestants. In recent years the number of converts to Protestant-Evangelical faiths has increased.
