= Dizhi =

Dizhi or Di Zhi may refer to:

- Earthly Branches, twelve traditional Chinese (later East Asian) signs, usually combined with the ten Heavenly Stems to form the Sexagenary cycle
- Emperor Zhi, a mythological emperor of ancient China
- Dizhi Subdistrict (地直街道), a subdistrict in Tiexi District, Siping, Jilin, China

== See also ==
- Dizi (disambiguation)
