= Mizan–Tepi University =

Tertiary higher education institution in South West Ethiopia Peoples' Region, Ethiopia

- Motto: Light of The Green Valley
- Type: Tertiary institution
- Established: 2006
- Accreditation: Ministry of Education
- Budget: 1.1 billion birr (2019)
- President: Mebratu G. Kallo
- Total staff: 200
- Students: +500
- Location: Mizan Teferi, South West Ethiopia Peoples' Region, Ethiopia; 7.196700°N 35.428899°E
- Language: English
- Website: mtu.mizantepiuniversity.net
- Location in Ethiopia

Mizan–Tepi University is a teritiary higher education institution situated in Mizan Teferi and Tepi in southwest Ethiopia. It is one of the new public universities in the country.

== Overview ==
Mizan–Tepi University was inaugurated in May 2006, when Mizan Teferi Agricultural TVET College became the founding center of the university. It has over 5,00 students and more than 200 lecturers. The university landed on 52 hectares on each both campuses. The university is surrounded by vegetation and natural resources.

A facility named Mizan–Tepi University Teaching Hospital was inaugurated in 1934, which initially served for leprosarium established by the Sudan Interior Mission (SIM). Emperor Haile Selassie pay homage to the hospital by renaming after his daughter Princess Zenebework Memorial Hospital. The name then changed to ALERT facility on 11 December 1965.

== Organization ==
The university consists of four faculties:

- Faculty of Sciences, consisting of the departments of Mathematics, Biology, Chemistry, and Physics;
- Faculty of Business and Economics, consisting of the departments of Accounting, Economics, Business Management, and Cooperatives;
- Faculty of Agriculture, consisting of the departments of Agricultural Engineering, Horticulture, and Plant Science;
- Faculty of Social Science, consisting of the departments of Geography and Sociology;Ethiopian Language(s)and Literature-Amharic
- Faculty of Engineering and Technology, consisting of the departments of Construction Technology and Management, Surveying Engineering and Computational Science

The University has recently added one faculty, the Faculty of Health Science with courses in subjects including Health science.

Facilities include libraries, computer laboratories, internet access and modern laboratories with the latest equipment. The university upgraded its computer facilities based on campus-wide local area networks, with enhanced internet and email access.

== Location ==
Mizan–Tepi University is located in relaxed surroundings on the edge of two cities Mizan Teferi and Tepi; the Science Faculty campus is found at Tepi, while the Education faculty is at the southern end of the town Mizan Teferi. Staff accommodation and student dorms are provided on each campus. Mizan tepi university is known live in Southern part of Ethiopia.

== See also ==
- List of universities and colleges in Ethiopia
- Education in Ethiopia
