= Negash Wagesho =

Ethiopian politician

Negash Wagesho Amencho
- Born: Dawuro
- Occupation: President of South West Ethiopia Peoples' Region

Negash Wagesho (English: Negash Wagesho Amencho, Amharic: ነጋሽ ዋጌሾ አሜንቾ) is an Ethiopian politician who has been serving as President of South West Ethiopia Peoples' Region since December, 2021. Before his assignment as President of the Region, he has served as State Minister for Ministry of Water, Irrigation and Electricity of Ethiopia.
