= Maji (woreda) =

District in South West Ethiopia People's Region, Ethiopia

Coordinates: 5°55′N 35°40′E

Maji (also known as Dizi) is a woreda in South West Ethiopia Peoples' Region, Ethiopia. Part of the West Omo zone, Maji is bordered on the south by the Kibish River which separates it from South Sudan, on the west by Surma, on the northwest by Bero, on the north by Meinit Shasha, and on the east by the Omo River which separates it from the Debub Omo Zone. Towns in Maji include Tum and Maji. The western part of Maji was separated to create Bero woreda and some southern kebeles were added to Nyangatom woreda.

Rivers in this woreda include the Netube and the Mui. High points include Mount Tiyaki and Mount Siski. A major portion of Maji is included in the Omo National Park. Maji suffers from a lack of roads and means of transport; remote locations are accessible only by air.

In May 2009, a Malaysian investor with over 3.7 billion Birr in capital was granted a lease to over 31,000 hectares of land to develop palm oil tree plantation on. The Zonal authorities also granted him an additional 10,000 hectares to cultivate rubber trees on.

== Demographics ==
Based on the 2007 Census conducted by the CSA, this woreda has a total population of 31,088, of whom 15,072 are men and 16,016 women; 4,838 or 15.56% of its population are urban dwellers. The majority of the inhabitants practiced Ethiopian Orthodox Christianity, with 62.23% of the population reporting that belief, 18.44% practiced traditional beliefs, 16.66% were Protestants, and 1.16% were Muslim.

In the 1994 national census Dizi had a population of 22,346, of whom 10,738 were men and 11,608 women; 4,316 or 19.31% of its population were urban dwellers. The three largest ethnic groups reported in this woreda were the Dizi (84.89%), the Amhara (9.41%), and the Oromo (3.07%); all other ethnic groups made up 2.63% of the population. Dizin was spoken as a first language by 83.42% of the inhabitants, and 15.3% spoke Amharic; the remaining 1.28% spoke all other primary languages reported. Concerning education, 24.74% of the population were considered literate; 15.67% of children aged 7–12 were in primary school; 7.85% of the children aged 13–14 were in junior secondary school, and 5.41% of the inhabitants aged 15–18 were in senior secondary school. Concerning sanitary conditions, about 57% of the urban and 14% of the total had toilet facilities.
