= HAMT =

HAMT may stand for:

- The ICAO code for Mizan Teferi Airport
- Hash array mapped trie, a functional data-structure
- Hodkinson abbreviated mental test score for dementia
- Human-aided machine translation
