= Sheko (woreda) =

District in South West Ethiopia Peoples' Region, Ethiopia

Coordinates: 6°50′N 35°00′E

Sheko is a woreda in South West Ethiopia Peoples' Region, Ethiopia. It is named for the Sheko people, whose homeland lies in this woreda. Part of the Bench Maji Zone, Sheko is bordered on the south by Debub Bench, on the west by Guraferda, on the northwest by the Gambela Region, on the north by the Sheka Zone, and on the east by Semien Bench. Towns in Sheko include Sheko.

== Overview ==
The most important rivers in this woreda include the Bergi, Gacheb, Onja, Dama, Beko, and Kashu. One of the few remaining extensive natural forest areas in the country is found in Sheko, with tropical species covering lowland and low midland elevations. High points in this woreda include Mount Bokol (2160 meters) and Mount Guraferda (2494 meters).

Sheko suffers from a lack of roads and means of transport; remote locations are accessible only by air. Most of the inhabitants live a sedentary life, except in the pastoral area around Guraferda. Major cash crops in this woreda include wheat, peppers, barley and pulses. Another source of income is honey production, which along with some cash crops find their way via traders to the administrative center of the Zone, Mizan Teferi, and from there as far as Jimma.

Four opposition parties, the Council of Alternative Forces for Peace and Democracy in Ethiopia, the All-Amhara People's Organization, the Southern Ethiopia Peoples' Democratic Coalition and the Oromo National Congress reported that 1,760 people were killed and thousands more wounded in Sheko woreda in late March and early April 2002 while protesting what they believed were elections irregularities.

== Demographics ==
Based on the 2007 Census conducted by the CSA, this woreda has a total population of 49,999, of whom 25,248 are men and 24,751 women; 4,826 or 9.65% of its population are urban dwellers. The majority of the inhabitants were Protestants, with 51.76% of the population reporting that belief, 27.94% practiced Ethiopian Orthodox Christianity, 10.47% practiced traditional beliefs, and 7.4% were Muslim.

In the 1994 national census Sheko had a population of 35,878, of whom 18,594 were men and 17,284 women; 2,271 or 6.33% of its population were urban dwellers. (This total also includes an estimate for the inhabitants of 2 rural kebeles, which were not counted; they were estimated to have 256 inhabitants, of whom 143 were men and 113 women.) The five largest ethnic groups reported in this woreda were the Sheko people (33.64%), the Amhara (16.09%), the Kafficho (15.26%), the Bench (12.7%), and the Me'en (5.76%); all other ethnic groups made up 16.55% of the population. Sheko was spoken as a first language by 33.88% of the inhabitants, 23.48% spoke Amharic, 12.56% spoke Kafa, 12.02% spoke Bench, and 5.5% spoke Me'en; the remaining 13.56% spoke all other primary languages reported.

The Sheko largely speak a language within the Omotic family, and have had patrilineally inherited chief positions known as kaibab. Some individuals practice a degree of agriculture, notably transplanting yams in more remote areas, while adopting sorghum and other crops in more centrally located regions. Concerning education, 15.88% of the population were considered literate; 9.91% of children aged 7–12 were in primary school; 2.36% of the children aged 13–14 were in junior secondary school, and 0.73% of the inhabitants aged 15–18 were in senior secondary school. Concerning sanitary conditions, about 73% of the urban and 10% of the total had toilet facilities.
