= Dizzy (disambiguation) =

Dizzy is the experiencing of dizziness, the state of being off balance.

Dizzy may also refer to:

== Fictional characters ==
- Dizzy Devil, a character from Tiny Toon Adventures
- Dizzy Flores, from the Robert Heinlein book Starship Troopers
- Dizzy Gillespie Harrison, the protagonist in the 2002 teen film The New Guy
- Dizzy Tremaine, from the Disney Descendants franchise
- Dizzy Wallin, from the Gears of War video game series
- Dizzy (Guilty Gear), a character from the Guilty Gear video game series
- Dizzy, a cement mixer character from Bob the Builder
- Dizzy, a character from Dark Oracle
- Dizzy, a character from Pinky Malinky

== Music ==
- Dizzy (band), a Canadian dream-pop band
- "Dizzy" (Goo Goo Dolls song)
- "Dizzy" (Olly Alexander song)
- "Dizzy" (Tommy Roe song), a song that later became a hit in the UK for Vic Reeves and the Wonder Stuff
- "Dizzy", a 2024 song by Cloud Wan
- "Dizzy", a song by Shonen Knife from Sweet Candy Power
- Dizzy, Japanese musician and former vocalist of the band D'erlanger
- Dizzy DROS, Moroccan rapper and producer

== Other uses ==
- Dizzy (nickname), a list of people with the nickname
- Dizzy (series), a European video game series, or its lead character
  - Dizzy – The Ultimate Cartoon Adventure
- 5831 Dizzy, an asteroid

== See also ==
- Dizi (disambiguation)
- Dizy (disambiguation)
- Dizzee Rascal (b. 1984), British rapper
