= Abadir (woreda) =

Abadir is one of the woredas in the Harari Region of Ethiopia.
