= Harari Region =

Regional state in eastern Ethiopia

Coordinates: 9°18′40″N 42°07′26″E

Harari Region: ሀረሪ ሑስኒ (Harari) ሐረሪ ክልል (Amharic); Naannoo Hararii (Oromo)
- Regional state
- Harari People's National Regional State
- Flag Seal
- Nickname: City of Saints
- Motto(s): City of Peace, Tolerance and Solidarity
- Map of Ethiopia showing Harari Region
- Country: Ethiopia
- Established: 1991
- Capital: Harar

Government
  - Chief Administrator: Ordin Bedri (Prosperity Party)

Area
  - Total: 334 km^{2} (129 sq mi)
  - Rank: 11

Population (2025)
  - Total: 312,000
  - Rank: 11
  - Density: 934/km^{2} (2,420/sq mi)
- ISO 3166 code: ET-HA
- HDI (2019): 0.588 medium · 2nd of 11

The Harari Region (Harari: ሀረሪ ሑስኒ; Amharic: ሐረሪ ክልል; Oromo: Naannoo Hararii), officially the Harari People's National Regional State (Harari: ዚሀረሪ ኡምመት ሑስኒ ሑኩማ; Amharic: የሐረሪ ሕዝብ ብሔራዊ ክልላዊ መንግሥት; Oromo: Mootummaa Naannoo Ummata Hararii), is a regional state in eastern Ethiopia, covering the homeland of the Harari people. Formerly named Region 13, its capital is Harar, and the region covers the city and its immediate surroundings. Harari Region is the smallest regional state in Ethiopia in both land area and population. Harari and Oromo are the two official languages of the region. The region was created by splitting the Hundane woreda from East Hararghe Zone. As a result, Harari Region is enclaved by Oromia.

== Demographics ==
Ethnic groups of Harari region (2007 Census)
1. Oromo (56.4%)
2. Amhara (22.8%)
3. Harari (8.65%)
4. Gurage (4.34%)
5. Somali (3.87%)
6. Tigray (1.53%)
7. Argobba (1.26%)
8. Other (1.17%)

Based on the 2007 Census conducted by the Central Statistical Agency of Ethiopia (CSA), Harari has a total population of 183,415, of whom 92,316 were men and 91,099 women. This region is the only one in Ethiopia where the majority of its population lives in an urban area: 99,368 or 54.18% of the population are urban inhabitants. With an estimated area of 311.25 square kilometers, this region has an estimated density of 589.05 people per square kilometer. For the entire region 46,169 households were counted, which results in an average for the region of 3.9 persons to a household, with urban households having on average 3.4 and rural households 4.6 people. Ethnic groups in the region include the Oromo (56.41%), Amhara (22.77%), Harari (8.65%), Gurage (4.34%), Somali (3.87%), Tigray (1.53%), and Argobba (1.26%). Languages spoken include Oromo (56.84%), Amharic (27.53%), Harari (7.33%), Somali (3.70%), and Gurage (2.91%).

In the previous census, conducted in 1994, the region's population was reported to be 131,139, of whom 65,550 were men and 65,589 women. At the time of that census, 76,378 or 58.24% of the population lived in urban areas. Ethnic groups in the region recorded in the earlier census included the Oromo (66.84%), Amhara (10.7%), Harari (7.1%), Gurage (3.2%), Tigray (2.71%), and Somali (1.68%). Languages recorded included Oromiffa (72.79%), Amharic (22.97%), Harari (7.61%), Gurage (1.13%) and Tigrinya (1.13%)

According to the CSA, as of 2004, 73.28% of the total population had access to safe drinking water, of whom 39.83% were rural inhabitants and 95.28% were urban. Values for other reported common indicators of the standard of living for the Harari region as of 2005 include the following: 5.7% of the inhabitants fall into the lowest wealth quintile; adult literacy for men is 78.4% and for women 54.9%; and the regional infant mortality rate is 66 infant deaths per 1,000 live births, which is less than the nationwide average of 77; at least half of these deaths occurred in the infants’ first month of life.

=== Religion ===
Religion in Harari Region (2007)
1. Muslim (69.0%)
2. Ethiopian Orthodox (27.1%)
3. P'ent'ay (3.40%)
4. Traditional faiths (0.10%)
5. Catholic (0.30%)
6. Other (0.10%)

The religion with the most believers in the region is Islam with 68.99%, 27.1% are Ethiopian Orthodox, 3.4% Protestant, 0.3% Catholic, and 0.2% followers of other religions. The population was projected to be 246,000 as of 2017. The religious composition of the population of the region indicated that 60.28% were Muslim, 38.09% Ethiopian Orthodox, 0.94% Protestant, and 0.46% Catholic in 1994.

=== Subdivisions ===
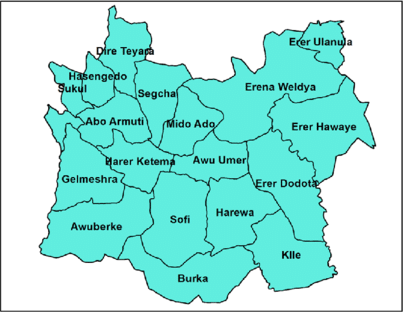
Kebeles in Harari Region (Harar and its urban kebeles are shown as one unit, Harer Ketema, and the unlabeled territory on the centre-left is part of the urban area. Some maps show a thin strip of land connecting it to the remaining area)

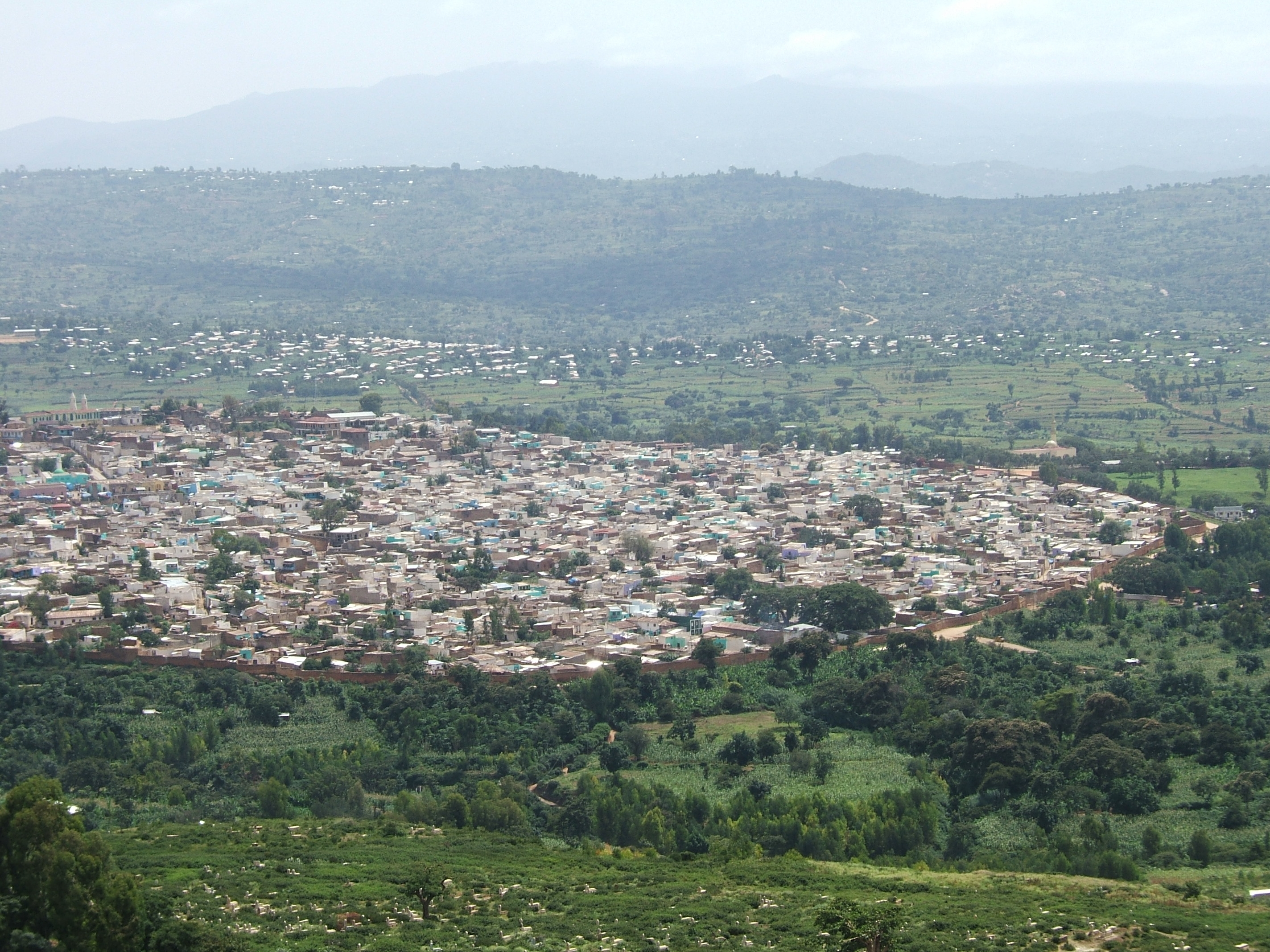
Aerial photo of the region.

There are 9 numbered woredas in Harari region. Under the woreda there are 19 city kebeles and 17 rural kebeles. The woredas are:

==== Urban ====
- Amir-Nur Woreda
- Abadir Woreda
- Shenkor Woreda
- Jin'Eala Woreda
- Aboker Woreda
- Hakim Woreda

City/urban kebeles are numbered from one to nineteen.

==== Rural ====
- Sofi Woreda
- Erer Woreda
- Dire-Teyara Woreda

Rural kebeles are:

- Suqul (Dire-Teyara Woreda)
- Hasen-Gey (Dire-Teyara Woreda)
- Dire Teyara (Dire-Teyara Woreda)
- Aboker Muti (Dire-Teyara Woreda)
- Sigicha (Dire-Teyara Woreda)
- Miyay (Dire-Teyara Woreda)
- Erer Weldya (Erer Woreda)
- Erer Ulanula (Erer Woreda)
- Erer Hawaye (Erer Woreda)
- Erer Dodota (Erer Woreda)
- Aw Umer (Sofi Woreda)
- Gelmashira (Sofi Woreda)
- Aw Berkhedle (Sofi Woreda)
- Sofi (Sofi Woreda)
- Harewae (Sofi Woreda)
- Qile (Sofi Woreda)
- Burqa (Sofi Woreda)

== Economy ==
The CSA of Ethiopia estimated in 2005 that farmers in Harari had a total of 31,730 head of cattle (representing less than 0.1% of Ethiopia's total cattle), 3,440 sheep (less than 0.1%), 26,910 goats (0.21%), 6,320 asses (0.25%), 31,430 poultry of all species (0.1%), and 670 beehives (less than 0.1%).

== List of Chief Administrators of Harari Region ==
According to worldstatesmen.org, the history of Chief Administrators of the Harari Region is:

- Ali Abdullahi Gutu, 1992 - August 1995
- Abdulahi Idris Ibrahim, September 1995 – September 1999
- Ghazali Mohammed, September 1999 – September 2000
- Nuria Abdulahi, (female president) September – October 2000
- Fuad Ibrahim (HNL), October 2000 – 3 October 2005
- Murad Abdulhadi (HNL), 3 October 2005 – November 2018
- Ordin Bedri (Prosperity Party), November 2018 – present

== See also ==
- East Hararghe Zone
- Harari People's Democratic Party
- Sultanate of Harar
- Emirate of Harar
- Adal Sultanate
- Harar
- Harari National League
- Harari Qurans
