= Dizy =

Dizy may refer to:

- Dizy, Switzerland, a municipality in the canton of Vaud
- in France
  - Dizy, Marne
  - Dizy-le-Gros in the Aisne department

== See also ==
- Dizzy (disambiguation)
- Dizi (disambiguation)
