= Mui River =

River in southern Ethiopia

The Mui is a river of southern Ethiopia. Located inside Omo National Park, it is a tributary of the Omo River on the right side, merging with the larger stream at 5°51′27″N 35°58′9″E.

== See also ==
- List of rivers of Ethiopia
