= Sofi Woreda =

Ethiopian administrative area

Sofi (Harari: ሶፊ) is one of the woredas in the Harari Region of Ethiopia.
