= Tepi, Ethiopia =

Tepi ቴፒ
- Location within Ethiopia
- Coordinates: 7°12′N 35°25′E
- Country: Ethiopia
- Region: South West Ethiopia Region
- Zone: Sheka
- Elevation: 1,097 m (3,599 ft)

Population (2005)
  - Total: 19,231
- Time zone: UTC+3 (EAT)

Tepi (Amharic: ቴፒ) (also transliterated Teppi and Tippi) is a town in southern Ethiopia. The vowels in the name are pronounced as in the English words tape and pea. Located in the Sheka Zone of the South West Ethiopia Region, this town has a latitude and longitude of 7°12′N 35°27′E with a mean elevation of 1,097 meters above sea level. The town is said to be named after a Majangir man who once had a bee hive in the large tree that stood in the marketplace.

== Overview ==
Tepi hosts an airport (ICAO code TIE; IATA code HATP) with a long, smooth but unpaved runway, the destination of scheduled flights by Ethiopian Airlines since the 1960s. Since 1966, the town has had a medical clinic and the same year the road to Tepi was improved. Electricity became available in 1984. The town also has postal service. This town has long been a market and commercial center for the area. Construction of all-weather roads were begun in the late 1970s, and by 1988 they extended from Tepi in three directions: south to Mizan Teferi (built with Cuban help), southeast to Shishinda (toward Bonga), and north to Gore. An elementary school was begun in Tepi about the time the Italians left, and the town has had a high school since about 1980. In 2009 Mizan Tepi University opened its Faculty of Engineering and Science in Tepi

Near the city is the Tepi Coffee Plantation Project, which is the second-largest coffee plantation in Ethiopia covering 6,205 hectares. Run by the state, it produces over 2,500 tonnes of raw arabica beans each year. The surrounding area is very hilly and was densely forested. The area claims to be Ethiopia’s center for turmeric, and also exports cardamom, ginger, corn, honey, beeswax, timber, sugar cane, bananas, mangoes, and other fruit. Due to the fly-borne disease trypanosomiasis, cattle do poorly in the area, so none are used for plowing. The disease also prevents equines (horses, donkeys, and mules) from being raised there.

The town has Ethiopian Orthodox churches, a mosque, and Protestant churches. There is also a strong following of a local spirit cult following Bulafo and Ginabo. Northeast of the town is an inactive shield volcano 2728 meters in height, which volcanologists call Tepi.

== History ==
People report that there had been a small Italian military presence there during World War II. The countryside around Tepi has long been multiethnic, including significant numbers of Majangir, Shekkacho, Sheko, Kafficho, and Oromo. Most of the city's residents (or their parents) are from other parts of Ethiopia, adding even more ethnic groups to the mix. In the 1980s, because of famine, many people from other provinces were resettled nearby. These acts have led to conflicts under ethnic federalism, since no ethnic group comprises a majority.

There has been occasional armed conflict in the area since 1991, involving people from the surrounding area dividing along ethnic lines.

In March 2002 between 600 and 800 persons were killed during clashes between the Majangir, Sheko, and Bench-Maji in and around the town of Tepi. Government officials reported 128 deaths; however, the Southern Ethiopia People's Democratic Coalition reported more than 1,700 deaths. More than 2,000 homes were destroyed and 5,800 persons were displaced as a result of the violence. The clashes involved local officials and members of each of these communities, and resulted from the dissatisfaction of many Sheko and Majangir who had wanted autonomy following an unsuccessful attempt in 1993 to move the Shekecho Zone from the SNNPR to the Gambela Region. While the Federal Government claimed to have arrested 41 policemen, 39 militia members, and 11 administrative officials for their participation in the clashes, it refused to allow an independent investigation of the incident and put the Federal Police in charge of the government's internal investigation.

One campus of the Mizan - Tepi University is located in Tepi.

== Demographics ==
The population of the immediate area has greatly increased since the 1970s and, based on 2005 figures from the Central Statistical Agency, this town has an estimated total population of 19,231, of whom 10,113 were males and 9,118 were females. Tepi is the largest settlement in Yeki woreda.

== Relevant literature ==
- Legesse, Mengistu, Fekede Balcha, and Berhanu Erko. "Status of onchocerciasis in Teppi area, Southwestern Ethiopia, after four years of annual community-directed treatment with ivermectin." Ethiopian Journal of Health Development 24, no. 1 (2010):51-56.
- Simeon, James. 2019. The Teppi Outbreak: An Introduction to Smallpox. In James Skelton, Alan Schnur, Gene L. Bartley, John Scott Porterfield, eds. 101-114. Eradicating Smallpox in Ethiopia: Peace Corps Volunteers' Accounts of Their Adventures, Challenges and Achievements. Peace Corps Writers.
