= Erer (Harari woreda) =

1 of the Districts of Ethiopia

Erer is one of the Districts of Ethiopia, which is in the Harari Region of Ethiopia.
