= Hakim (woreda) =

District in Harari Region, Ethiopia

Hakim is one of the woredas in the Harari Region of Ethiopia.
