= Dire-Teyara (woreda) =

Dire-Teyara is one of the woredas in the Harari Region of Ethiopia.
