= Shenkor (woreda) =

Shenkor is one of the woredas in the Harari Region of Ethiopia.
