= Aboker (woreda) =

Aboker is one of the woredas in the Harari Region of Ethiopia.
