= Jin'eala (woreda) =

Jin'Eala is one of the woredas in the Harari Region of Ethiopia.
