= Masha (town) =

Town in Southern Nations, Nationalities, and Peoples' Region, Ethiopia

Masha is a town in south-western Ethiopia. Located in the Sheka Zone in the Southern Nations, Nationalities, and Peoples Region (SNNPR), this town has a latitude and longitude of 7°44′50″N 35°28′30″E with an elevation of 2223 meters above sea level. Masha had been the administrative center of the Sheka Zone until 1996 when that Zone was combined with the Keffa Zone to create the Kaficho Shekacho Zone, when it was demoted to the administrative center of only the Masha Anderacha woreda. When the two former Zones were re-created towards the end of 2000, Masha once again became the capital of the restored Sheka Zone.

According to the SNNPR's Bureau of Finance and Economic Development, as of 2003 Masha's amenities include electrical service provided by a diesel generator, a bank, and a branch of one of the local microfinance organizations. In 2004, the Ministry of Agriculture proposed the Masha Anderacha woreda as part of a voluntary resettlement program, which led to the local settlement of over 2,000 people from other areas.

== Demographics ==
Based on figures from the Central Statistical Agency in 2005, Masha has an estimated total population of 11,122 of whom 5,393 are men and 5,729 are women. The 1994 national census reported this town had a total population of 6,138 of whom 2,986 were men and 3,152 were women.
