= East Borana Zone =

Zone of Oromia Region, Ethiopia

East Borana Zone is one of the zones of the Oromia Region of Ethiopia. Located in southern Oromia. East Borana Zone is bordered on the south by Kenya, on the west by the South Ethiopia Regional State, on the north by the West Guji Zone and on the east by the Borena Zone. East Borana Zone was created by restructuring the districts from Guji Zone, Bale Zone and Borena Zone. Its administrative center is Negele Borana.

In the beginning, the zonal restructuring was opposed by the local community. The main source of opposition was Negele Borana, which was the capital of Guji zone was made to be the capital of this zone.
