= Amir-Nur (woreda) =

District in Ethiopia

Amir-Nur is one of the woredas in the Harari Region of Ethiopia.
