= Sheko language =

Omotic language of Ethiopia

Sheko
- Native to: Ethiopia
- Region: Bench Maji Zone, Kafa region
- Native speakers: 39,000 (2007 census)
- Language family: Afro-Asiatic: Omotic; North; Dizoid; Sheko

Language codes
- ISO 639-3: she
- Glottolog: shek1245
- ELP: Sheko

Sheko is an Omotic language of the Afro-Asiatic language family spoken in the area between Tepi and Mizan Teferi in western Ethiopia, in the Sheko district in the Bench Maji Zone. The 2007 census lists 38,911 speakers; the 1998 census listed 23,785 speakers, with 13,611 identified as monolinguals.

Sheko, together with the Dizi and Nayi languages, is part of a cluster of languages variously called "Maji" or "Dizoid".

The language is notable for its retroflex consonants (Aklilu Yilma 1988), a striking feature shared with closely related Dizi and nearby (but not closely related) Bench (Breeze 1988).

== Phonology ==
Apart from the above-mentioned retroflex consonants, the phonology of Sheko is characterized by a total 28 consonant phonemes, five long vowels and six short vowels, plus four phonemic tone levels.

=== Consonants ===
Hellenthal (2010, p. 45) lists the following consonant phonemes of Sheko:

		Labial	Alveolar	Post- alveolar	Retroflex	Velar	Glottal
Plosive	Ejective	pʼ	tʼ			kʼ	
Plosive	Voiceless		t			k	ʔ
Plosive	Voiced	b	d			ɡ	
Affricate	Ejective		tsʼ	tʃʼ	tʂʼ		
Affricate	Voiceless		ts	tʃ	tʂ		
Fricative	Voiceless	f	s	ʃ	ʂ		h
Fricative	Voiced		z	ʒ	ʐ		
Nasal		m	n				
tap			r [ɾ]				
Approximant		w		j			

Unlike other Dizoid languages, Sheko has no contrast between /r/ and /l/. Consonants are rarely geminated, and there is a syllabic nasal /n̩/.

=== Vowels ===
Hellenthal (2010, p. 56) lists the following long and short vowels of Sheko: /i/, /iː/, /e/, /eː/ /ə/, /a/, /aː/, /u/, /uː/, /o/, /oː/.

=== Tones ===
Sheko is one of very few languages in Africa that have four distinct phonemic tone levels. Tone distinguishes meaning both in the lexicon and in the grammar, particularly to distinguish persons in the pronominal system.

== Grammar ==
Ethnologue lists the following morphosyntactic features: "SOV; postpositions; genitives, articles, adjectives, numerals, relatives after noun heads; question word initial; 1 prefix, 5 suffixes; word order distinguishes subjects, objects, indirect objects; affixes indicate case of noun phrases; verb affixes mark person, number, gender of subject; passives, causatives, comparatives."
