= Dizi people =

Omotic-speaking ethnic group in southern Ethiopia

Dizi
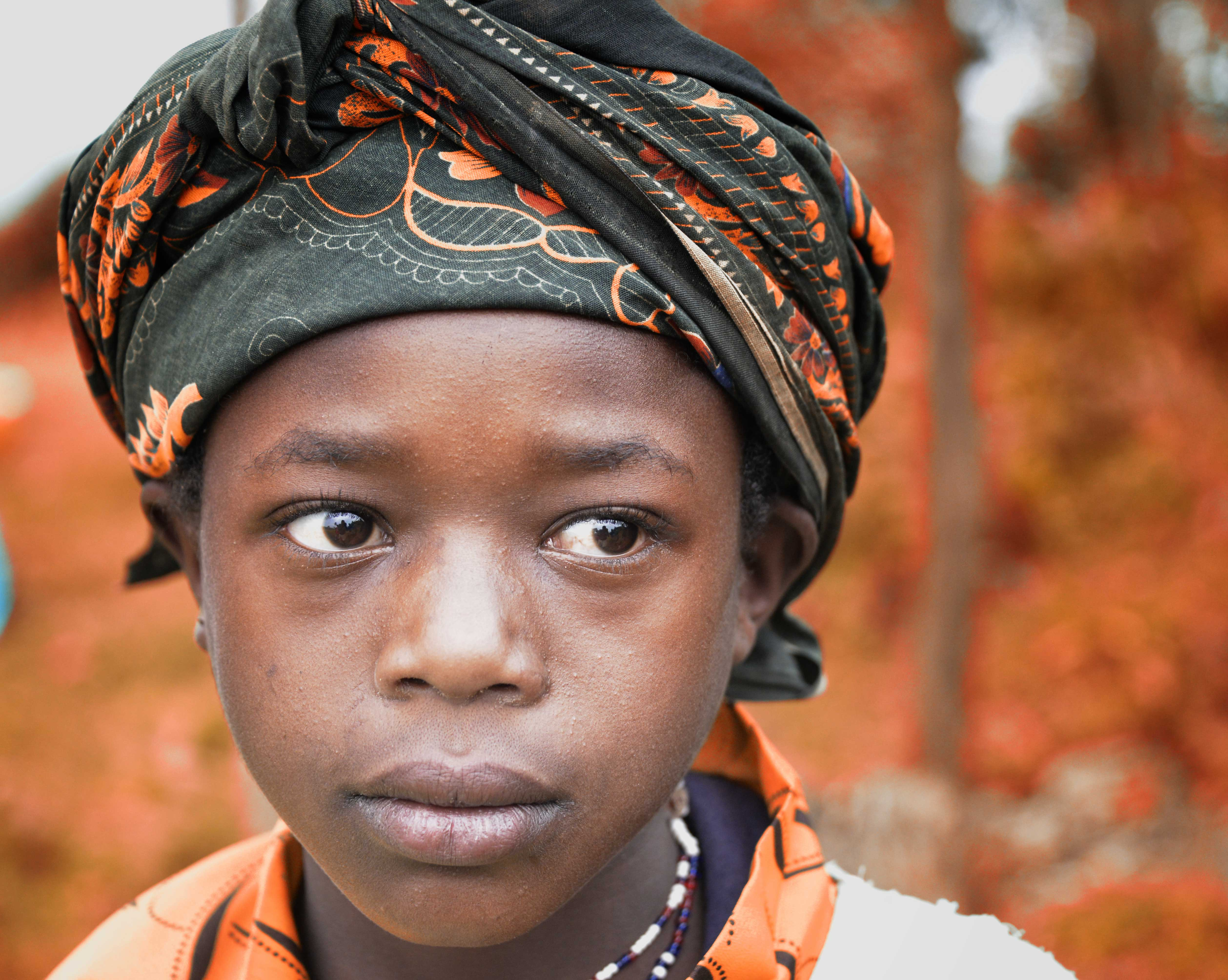
- A Dizi girl

Total population
- 36,380 (2007, census)

Regions with significant populations
- Ethiopia

Languages
- Dizin

Religion
- Animism

Dizi (also known as the Maji) is the name of an ethnic group living in southern Ethiopia. They share a number of somatic similarities with certain culturally (but not always linguistically) related peoples of south-western Ethiopia, which include the Sheko and Nao, the Gimira (She, Bench, Mere), the Tsara, the Dime, the Aari and certain sub-groups of the Basketo people. A. E. Jensen has gathered these groups under the label of the "ancient peoples of southern Ethiopia". They speak the Dizin language (part of the Omotic languages).

Before their forced incorporation into the Ethiopian Empire in the 1890s, based on their own statements and the evidence of numerous abandoned terraced hillsides, the Dizi are estimated to have numbered between 50,000 and 100,000. However, as Haberland observes, the imposition of an outside authority and its misrule led to a massive depopulation due to the abuses of the gebbar system, slave-raiding, "famine, disease and a growing sense of hopelessness and resignation, engendered by a total absence of justice. These things not only caused the number of Dizi to shrink (in 1974 there were probably scarcely more than 20,000) but shook their whole culture to its roots."

== History ==
The Dizi people were divided into many independent chiefdoms prior to Menelik II's conquests.

== Demographics ==
The 2007 Ethiopian national census reported that 36,380 people (or 0.05% of the population) identified themselves as Dizi, of whom 4,968 were urban inhabitants. The Southern Nations, Nationalities, and People's Region is home to 98.9% of this people. They are the majority of the inhabitants of the Maji woreda, and have notable minorities in the neighboring Meinit and Surma woredas.
