= Dizin language =

Omotic language spoken in southern Ethiopia

Dizin
- Native to: Ethiopia
- Region: Mirab Omo
- Ethnicity: Dizi
- Native speakers: 34,000 (2007 census)
- Language family: Afro-Asiatic: Omotic; North; Dizoid; Dizin

Language codes
- ISO 639-3: mdx
- Glottolog: dizi1235

Dizin (often called “Dizi” or “Maji” in the literature) is an Omotic language of the Afro-Asiatic language family spoken by the Dizi people, primarily in the Maji woreda of the Southern Nations, Nationalities and Peoples Region, located in southwestern Ethiopia. The 2007 census listed 33,927 speakers. A population of 17,583 was identified as monolinguals in 1994.

The language has basic SOV (subject–object–verb) word order, tones, and is largely suffixing. Phonologically, "Features of the Dizin sound system include glottalized consonants, syllabic nasals, lengthened vowels, three phonemic tone levels and contour tones. Western Dizin has phonemic retroflex consonants. The glottal stop is analyzed as phonemic word initially before nasals, but not phonemic elsewhere". (Beachy 2005:iv)

Dizin, together with the Sheko and Nayi languages, is part of a cluster of languages variously called "Maji" or "Dizoid".
