= Omo National Park =

National park in South Ethiopia Regional State, Ethiopia

- IUCN category II (national park)
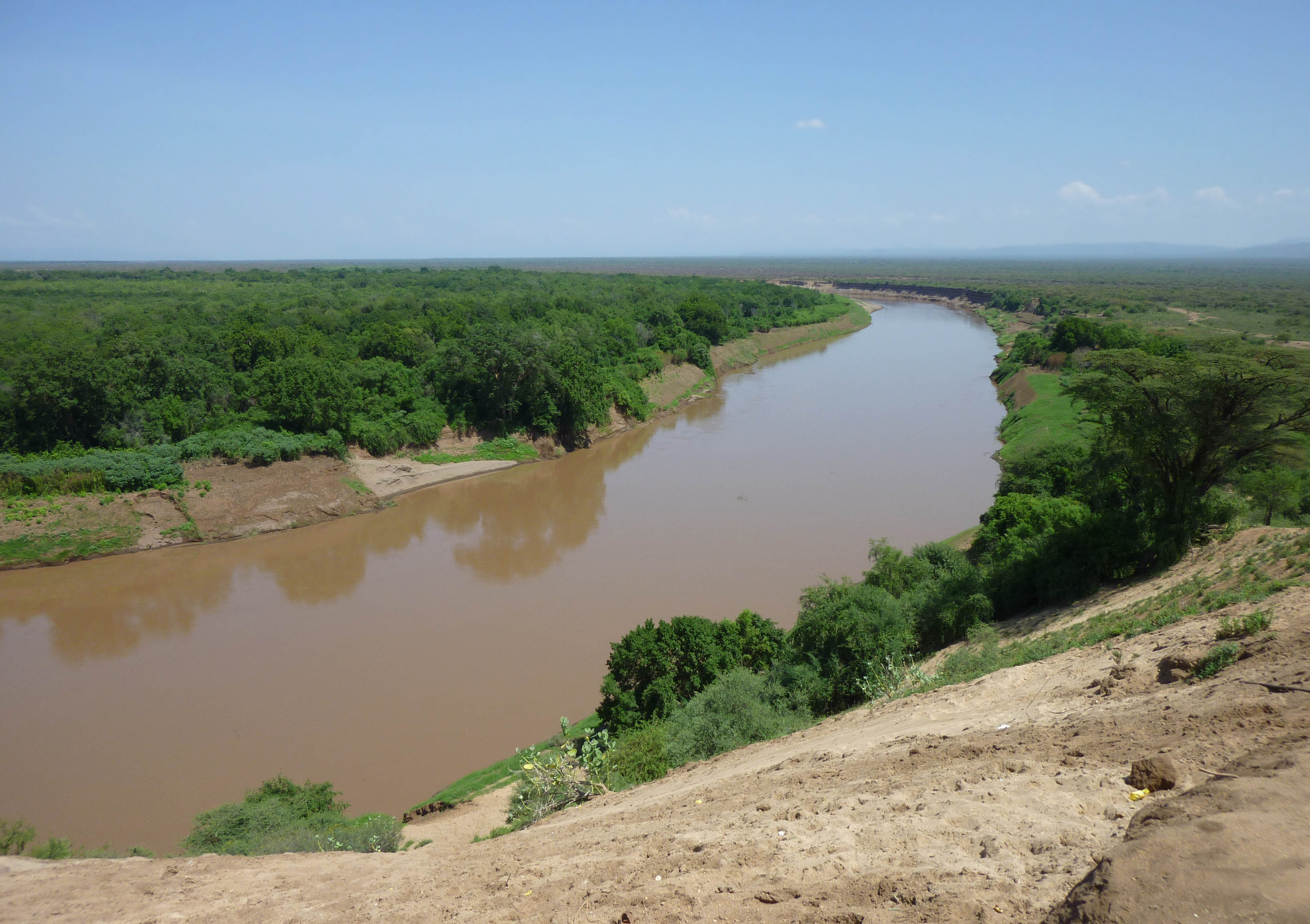
- Omo River located in the eastern part of Omo National Park

- Location within Ethiopia
- Location: South Ethiopia Regional State, Ethiopia
- Nearest city: Jinka
- Coordinates: 6°0′N 35°50′E
- Area: 4,068 km^{2} (1,571 sq mi)
- Established: 1980
- Governing body: Ethiopian Wildlife Conservation Authority

Omo National Park is a national park in Ethiopia founded in 1980. Located in the South Ethiopia Regional State on the west bank of the Omo River, the park covers approximately 4,068 square kilometers, about 870 kilometers southwest of Addis Ababa; across the Omo is the Mago National Park and the Tama Wildlife Reserve. Although an airstrip was recently built near the park headquarters on the Mui River, this park is not easily reachable; the Lonely Planet guide Ethiopia and Eritrea describes Omo National Park as "Ethiopia's most remote park".

== Geography ==
Omo National Park is located on the west bank of the Omo River in the lower Omo Valley. The park is 140 km long, stretching from the Neruze River in the south to the Sharum plain in the north, and up to 60 km wide where the Park Headquarters are situated. Major land features include the Omo River on the east, the Maji Mountains, the Sharum, and Sai plains to the north and west, and the Illibai plains and Dirga Hills to the south. There are three hot springs, and the park is crossed by some rivers, all of which drain into the Omo. The Mui River crosses the middle of the park before joining the Omo River. Much of the park is at 800m but the southern part by the Neruze River drops to 450 m. The highest peak of Maji Mountains which is located within the park is 1,541 m above sea level.

== Flora ==
The vegetation of Omo National Park is mostly open savannah, thickets, and riverine woodland that lies near the western banks of the Omo River. Species include Ficus sycomorus, Tapura fischeri, Melanodiscus oblongus, Celtis integrifolia, Trichilia roka, Cordia sinensis, Acacia mellifera, and Ziziphus mauritiana.

== Fauna ==
The park offers excellent opportunities to view wildlife with 73 species of mammals and 312 species of birds.

=== Mammal ===
Omo National Park is home to large herds of buffalos, zebras, elands, beisa oryxes, tiangs, Lelwel hartebeests, dik-diks, bushbucks, reedbucks, and Grant's gazelles. Other mammals that are elusively rare to find include elephants, lions, leopards, cheetahs, bushpigs, African wild dogs, giraffes, oribis, klipspringers, greater kudus, hyenas, black rhinoceros, hippopotamuses, and warthogs. Primates such as the Mantled guerezas, Olive baboons, and De Brazza monkeys also live within forested areas.

=== Avifauna ===
Bird species of this park consist of ostriches, eagles, egrets, herons, barbets, honeyguides, kingfishers, Secretary birds, woodpeckers, parrots, shrikes, and weavers also thrived here.

=== Herpetofauna ===
Omo national park is also home to nile crocodiles, Black mambas, African spurred tortoises, Black-necked spitting cobras, Rhombic Night Adder, puff adders, and rock pythons that are common here.

== Geology ==
The lower reaches of the Omo river were declared a UNESCO World Heritage Site in 1980, after the discovery (in the Omo Kibish Formation) of the earliest known fossil fragments of Homo sapiens, which have been dated circa 195,000 years old.

== Conservation ==
=== Visitors accommodation ===
There is virtually no tourist infrastructure within the park and little support for travelers. It was reported in 1999 that none of the tourist agencies within or outside Ethiopia would arrange tours in the park. The Walta Information Center announced on 3 October 2006 that US$1 million had been allocated to construct "roads and recreational centers as well as various communication facilities" with the intent to attract more visitors.

=== Park management issues ===
The Mursi, Suri, Nyangatom, Dizi, and Me'en are reported in danger of displacement and/or denial of access to their traditional grazing and agricultural land. This follows the demarcation of the Park boundaries in November 2005, and the recent management takeover of the park by African Parks. This process threatens to make the Omo people illegal squatters on their land.

There are reports that these tribal peoples have been coerced into signing documents they could not read by Park officials.

In October 2008, African Parks announced they were giving up the management of the Omo National Park and leaving Ethiopia. AP stated that sustainable management of the Ethiopian parks is incompatible with 'the irresponsible way of living of some of the ethnic groups. The organization has trouble dealing with the indigenous population trying to continue its traditional way of life within the park borders.
