= West Omo Zone =

Zone in the South West Ethiopia Region

The regions and zones of Ethiopia

West Omo or Mirab Omo is a Zone in the Ethiopian South West Ethiopia Peoples' Region. West Omo is located at Ethiopia's southern margin, where Maji and Surma woredas are bordering Kenya, encompassing the area to the west of the Omo River. The area is dominantly inhabited by the Dizi, Suri and Me'enit communities.

West Omo Zone has seven districts and 116 kebeles (112 rural and 4 urban).

== Demographics ==
The West Omo Zone has a population of 272,943 people, accounting for 12% of South West Ethiopia Peoples' Region, and comprises 49.5% male and 50.5% female in 55,703 households. 60% were pastoral.
