= Mizan Teferi =

Town in South West Ethiopia Peoples' Region, Ethiopia

Mizan-Aman
- Town
- Location within Ethiopia
- Coordinates: 7°0′N 35°35′E
- Country: Ethiopia
- Region: South West Ethiopia Peoples' Region
- Zone: Bench Sheko

Population (2022)
  - Total: 91,437
- Time zone: UTC+3 (EAT)
- Area code: 47
- Climate: Aw

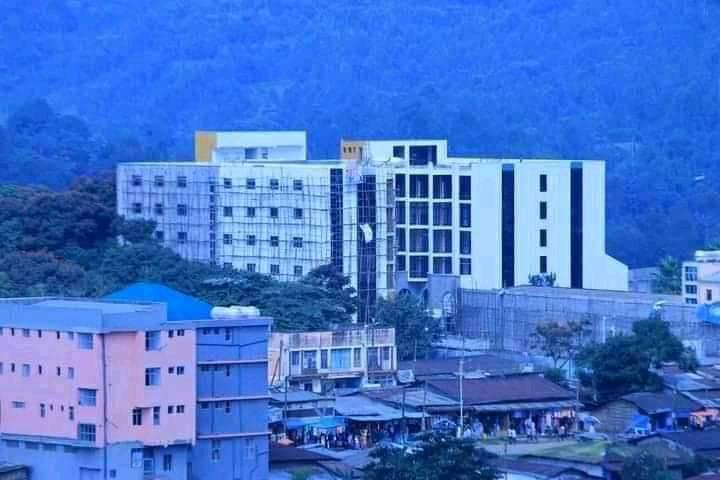

Mizan Teferi (Amharic: ሚዛን ተፈሪ) (also called Mizan-Aman or simply Mizan) is the largest town in South West Ethiopia Peoples' Region and one of four Capital cities of the region. Mizan is also the administrative centre, of the Bench Sheko Zone in the South West Ethiopia Peoples' Region of Ethiopia. Located about 160 kilometers southwest of Jimma, Mizan Tefere has a latitude and longitude of 7°0′N 35°35′E and an elevation of 1451 meters. Mizan Teferi, together with the neighbouring town of Aman, forms a separate woreda called Mizan Aman. This is surrounded by Debub Bench woreda.

== Overview ==
Mizan Teferi is served by an airport (ICAO code HAMT, IATA MTF) with an unpaved runway. Until 1966, the town was connected by only a dry weather road to Gore; that year the roads to Bonga and Tepi were improved by the Highway Authority. Further proposed improvements were promised on 13 December 2006, when the Ethiopian government announced that it had secured a loan of US$98 million from the African Development Bank to pave the 227 kilometers of highway between Jimma and Mizan Teferi to the southwest. The loan would cover 64% of the 1270.97 million Birr budgeted for this project.

By 1996 there was 24-hour electricity, and access to potable water.

According to the SNNPR's Bureau of Finance and Economic Development, as of 2003 Mizan Teferi's amenities also include digital telephone access, postal service, and a bank and a hospital. Near the town is the Bebeka coffee plantation. It is also the location of two institutions of higher education, Aman Health Science College and Mizan - Tepi University.

Records at the Nordic Africa Institute website provide details of the primary and secondary school in 1968, and a 70-bed hospital built in 1989. During the existence of the Bench Zone (created in the mid-1990s) Mizan Teferi was its administrative center.

== Demographics ==
Based on the 2007 Census conducted by the CSA, woreda of Mizan Aman has a total population of 34,080, of whom 18,138 are men and 15,942 women. The majority of the inhabitants practiced Ethiopian Orthodox Christianity, with 45.97% of the population reporting that belief, 33.8% were Protestants, 17.71% were Muslim, and 1.05% practiced traditional beliefs.

The 1994 national census reported this town had a total population of 10,652 of whom 5,612 were males and 5,040 were females.

== Origins of the name Mizan Teferi ==
The name Mizan Teferi derives from the Amharic word mizan, meaning scale or weight and reflects the town's history as a trade hub. In the early 20th century, the area served as a point where agricultural produce collected was sold to merchants. Local farmers, believing they were being shortchanged due to inaccurate weights used by buyers, sought intervention from the then-regent of Ethiopia, Lij Teferi Mekonnen. Lij Teferi, who later became Emperor Haile Selassie, responded by sending an official scale to the area to ensure fairness in trade. This scale became a central feature of the trade post, and the site was named Mizan Teferi, combining mizan (scale) with Teferi to indicate the correctness of the scale that was being used. Over time, the trade post grew into a major town, now simply shortened to Mizan.

== Notes ==
https://www.press.et/?p=78500
