= Bench people =

Ethnic group in southwestern Ethiopia

Mer Bench

Total population
- 680,000

Languages
- Bench

Religion
- Christianism (P'ent'ay)

Related ethnic groups
- Kafficho

The Bench people (Bench: Mer Bench) are an Omotic-speaking people indigenous to southwestern Ethiopia. According to the 2007 census, there are 353,526 Bench people in Ethiopia, making up 0.48% of the country's total population. Bench are among the major ethnic groups inhabiting the Bench Maji Zone in the Southern Nations, Nationalities and Peoples' Region (SNNPR), and the majority live in the former district of Bench, which was divided into Debub Bench, Semien Bench, and She Bench districts. The Bench language is the ancestral language of Bench people and belongs to the Northern Omotic languages.

== Economy ==
Bench people are subsistence farmers who cultivate maize, sorghum, and root crops such as taro and yam as their major staple crops, though coffee and Ethiopian cardamom are also cultivated as the main cash crops. In some highland areas, Bench people cultivate barley, wheat, beans, peas and teff. According to the Bench District Administration Office, Bench also raise cattle, sheep, goats, equine and poultry.
