= Bench language =

Northern Omotic language of Ethiopia

Bench
- Bencnon
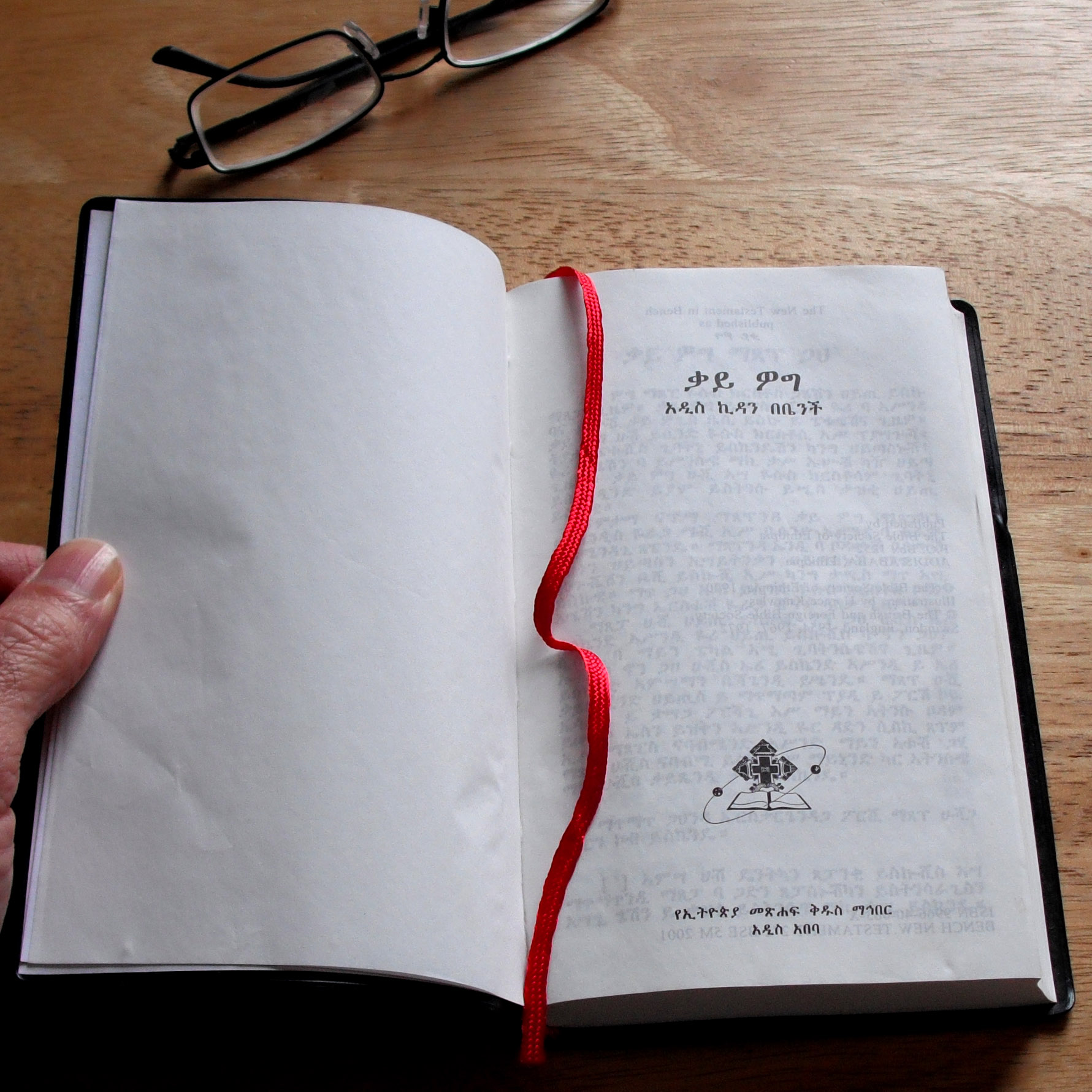
- The New Testament in Bench, written in the Ge'ez script
- Pronunciation: [bentʂnon]
- Native to: Ethiopia
- Region: Bench Maji Zone
- Ethnicity: Bench
- Native speakers: 348,000 Bench Non, 8,000 Mer, 490 She (2007)
- Language family: Afro-Asiatic: Omotic; North; Bench
- Dialects: Benc Non (Benesho); Mer (Mieru); She (Kaba)
- Writing system: Latin; Geʽez script

Language codes
- ISO 639-3: bcq
- Glottolog: benc1235
- ELP: Shé
- Linguasphere: 16-BBA-a

Bench (Bencnon, Shenon or Mernon, formerly called Gimira) is a Northern Omotic language of the "Gimojan" subgroup, spoken by about 174,000 people (in 1998) in the Bench Maji Zone of the South West Ethiopia Peoples' Region, in southern Ethiopia, around the towns of Mizan Teferi and Shewa Gimira. In a 2006 dissertation, Christian Rapold described three varieties of Bench (Benchnon, Shenon, and Mernon) as "...mutually intelligible...varieties of one and the same language". Bench is the ancestral language of the Bench people.

In unusual variance from most of the other languages in Africa, Bench has retroflex consonant phonemes. The language is also noteworthy in that it has been claimed to have six phonemic pitch levels in its tone system, one of only a handful of languages in the world that have this many, though it has since been reanalyzed with five levels. Bench has a whistled form used primarily by male speakers, which permits communication over greater distances than spoken Bench. The whistle can be created using the lips or made from a hollow created with both hands. Additionally, this form of the language may be communicated via the 5-stringed krar.

== Phonology ==
The phonemic vowels of Bench are /i e a o u/.

There are six phonemic tones: five level tones (numbered 1 to 5 in the literature, with 1 being the lowest) and one rising tone 23 /˨˧/. The top tone is sometimes realized as a high rising 45 [˦˥]. On the vowel o, they are /ő ó ō ò ȍ ǒ/

The consonants are:

		Bilabial	Coronal	Palato- alveolar	Retroflex	Velar	Glottal
Nasal		m	n				
Plosive	Voiceless	p	t			k	ʔ
Plosive	Voiced	b	d			ɡ	
Plosive	Ejective	pʼ	tʼ			kʼ	
Affricate	Voiceless		ts	tʃ	tʂ		
Affricate	Ejective		tsʼ	tʃʼ	tʂʼ		
Fricative	Voiceless		s	ʃ	ʂ		h
Fricative	Voiced		z	ʒ	ʐ		
Trill			r				
Approximant			l	j			

All of these can occur palatalized, but only before /a/, suggesting an alternate analysis of a sixth phonemic vowel /ja/. Labialized consonants are reported for [p, b, s, ɡ,] and [ʔ], but their phonemic status is unclear; they only occur after /i/.

For the phoneme /p/ the realizations of [pʰ] and [f] are in free variation; /j/ has the allophone [w] before back vowels.

The syllable structure is (C)V(C)(C)(C) + tone or (C) N (C), where C represents any consonant, V any vowel, N any nasal, and brackets an optional element. CC clusters consist of a continuant followed by a plosive, fricative, or affricate; in CCC clusters, the first consonant must be one of /r/ /j/ /m/ /p/ or /pʼ/, the second either /n/ or a voiceless fricative, and the third /t/ or /k/.

== Grammar ==
=== Nouns ===
Plurals may optionally be formed by adding the suffix [-n̄d]; however, these are rarely used except with definite nouns. E.g.: [wű īŋɡn̄d] "her relatives"; [ātsn̄dī bá ka̋ŋɡ] "all the people".

=== Pronouns ===
==== Personal pronouns ====
English	oblique	subject	locative	vocative
I	[tá]	[tān]	[tȁtʼn̄]	
you (sg.)	[ní]	[nēn]	[nȉtʼn̄]	[wȍ] (m.), [hȁ] (f.)
you (hon.)	[jìnt]	[jìnt]	[jìnt]	
he	[jı̋]	[jīs]	_	
he (hon.)	[ı̋ts]	[ı̋ts]	[ı̋ts]	
she	[wű]	[wūs]	_	
she (hon.)	[ɡēn]	[ɡēn]	[ɡēn]	
himself/herself	[bá]	[bān]	[bȁtʼn̄]	
we (excl.)	[nú]	[nūn]	[nȕtʼn̄]	
we (incl.)	[nı̋]	[nīn]	[nȉtʼn̄]	
you (pl.)	[jìntȁjkʼn̄]	[jìntȁjkʼn̄]	[jìntȁjkʼn̄]	
they	[ı̋tsȁjkʼn̄]	[ı̋tsȁjkʼn̄]	[ı̋tsȁjkʼn̄]	

The word [bá] goes slightly beyond being a reflexive pronoun; it can mark any third person that refers to the subject of the sentence, e.g.:

[jȉsī bá dōr ɡȍtùē]
he.SUBJ own sheep sell.he.FIN
"he sold his (own) sheep"

[bȍdám hāŋkʼá bājístāɡùʂn̄ pāntsʼà ěz]
road.ABL go.self self.be.STAT.DET.when leopard-NPMk {big see.he.FIN}
"when he was going along the road, he saw a big leopard"

The oblique form is basic, and serves as object, possessive, and adverbial. The subject form has three variants: normal (given above), emphatic - used when the subject is particularly prominent in the sentence, especially sentence-initially - and reduced, used as part of a verb phrase. The "locative" term means "to, at, or for one's own place or house", e.g.:

[kȁrtá tȁtʼn̄ tā hāŋkʼùē]
return.I to.my.house I go.I.FIN
"I went home"

==== Determiners ====
The main determiners are "that, the" (masc. [ùʂ], fem. [èn], pl. [ènd]) and "this" (masc. [hàʂ], fem. [hàn], pl. [hànd]). As suffixes on a verb or an ablative or locative phrase, they indicate a relative clause. E.g.:

[ātsn̄dà hàndīs hǎrám bād átsn̄dȁ?]
person.PL.NPMk these.OBJ what.ABL separate make.FUT.INTL
"how can I separate these people?"

[átsín kétn̋ jískèn]
woman house.LOC be.that
"the woman who is in the house"

=== Demonstratives ===
The demonstratives include [háŋ] "here", [ēk] "there (nearby)", [jìŋk] "there (far away)", [nēɡ] "down there", [nèk] "up there". Alone, or with the determiner suffixes [ùʂ] or [àʂ] added, these function as demonstrative pronouns "this person", "that person", etc. With the noun phrase marker [-à], they become demonstrative adjectives. E.g.:

[hàŋ nás dȁdn̄ àtāɡùʂn̄]
here man near reach.STAT.DET.when
"when he came near to the man..."

[njāʔà nēɡà hàndī]
boy.NPMk down.there.NPMk DET.SUBJ
"these boys down there"

=== Numbers ===
The numbers are:

1	[mātʼ]
2	[nám]
3	[káz]
4	[ód]
5	[ùtʂ]
6	[sàpm̄]
7	[nàpm̄]
8	[njàrtn̄]
9	[ìrstn̄]
10	[ta̋m]
100	[bǎl]
1000	[wňm]

20, 30, etc. are formed by adding [tàm] "ten" (with tone change) to the unit. In compound numbers, [-á] is added to each 'figure, thus:

13 [ta̋má kázá]
236 [nám bǎlá kāztàmá sàpm̄á]

When a cardinal number functions as an adjective, the suffix [-ās] can be added (e.g. [njāʔà kázās] "three children"). Ordinal numbers are formed by suffixing [-nás] to the cardinal, e.g.: [ódnás] "fourth".

=== Adjectives ===
Adjectives are sometimes intensified by changing the tone to top; e.g. [ěz] "big" → [e̋z] "very big".

=== Verbs ===
Verbs with monosyllabic roots can have three different forms of their active stems: the singular imperative, which is just the root; the past stem, usually identical to the root but sometimes formed by adding -k (with changes to the preceding consonant); and the future stem, usually identical to the root but sometimes formed by changing the tone from mid 3 to high 4 or from bottom 1 to top 5. Some have causative (formed by adding [-ās] or [-̏s], and changing mid tone to high) and passive (formed by adding [-n̄], [-t], or [-̏k] to the causative) forms. Verbal nouns are formed from the stem, sometimes with tone change or addition or [-t].

Verbs with polysyllabic roots have at least two forms, one with an intransitive or passive meaning and one with a transitive or causative meaning; the former ends in [-n̄], the latter in [-ās]. A passive may be formed by ending in [-āsn̄]. Verbal nouns are formed by taking the bare stem without [-n̄] or [-ās].

Compound verbs are formed with [màk] "say" or [màs] "cause to say", a formation common among Ethiopian languages.

The primary tenses are simple past (formed from the past stem), future (future stem plus [-n̄s-]), present perfect (from present participle stem); negative (future stem plus [-árɡ-].) E.g.: [hām] → [hāŋkʼùē] "he went"; [hámsm̄sùē] "he will go"; [hāŋkʼńsùē] "he has gone".

There are four corresponding participles: past (formed from the past stem), present perfect (formed from the past stem with the suffix [-ńs-], [-ńɡ], or [-áŋkʼ-]), imperfect (formed from the future stem with the stative suffix [-āɡ-]), and negative (formed from the future stem with the negative suffix [-árɡ-] or [-ù-] or a person/number marker.) The order of affixes is: root-(tense)-(negative)-(foc. pn.)-person/number-marker.

== Orthography and literature ==
A Latin-based orthography was adopted in 2008. Previously, the New Testament had been published in the Bench language using an orthography based on the Ethiopian syllabary. Tones were not indicated. Retroflex consonants were indicated by such techniques as using extra symbols from the syllabary (the "nigus s") and forming new symbols (the addition of an extra arm on the left side for "t").
