= South West Ethiopia Peoples' Region =

Regional state in southwestern Ethiopia

Southwest Ethiopia Peoples' Region: የደቡብ ምዕራብ ኢትዮጵያ ሕዝቦች ክልል (Amharic)
- Regional state
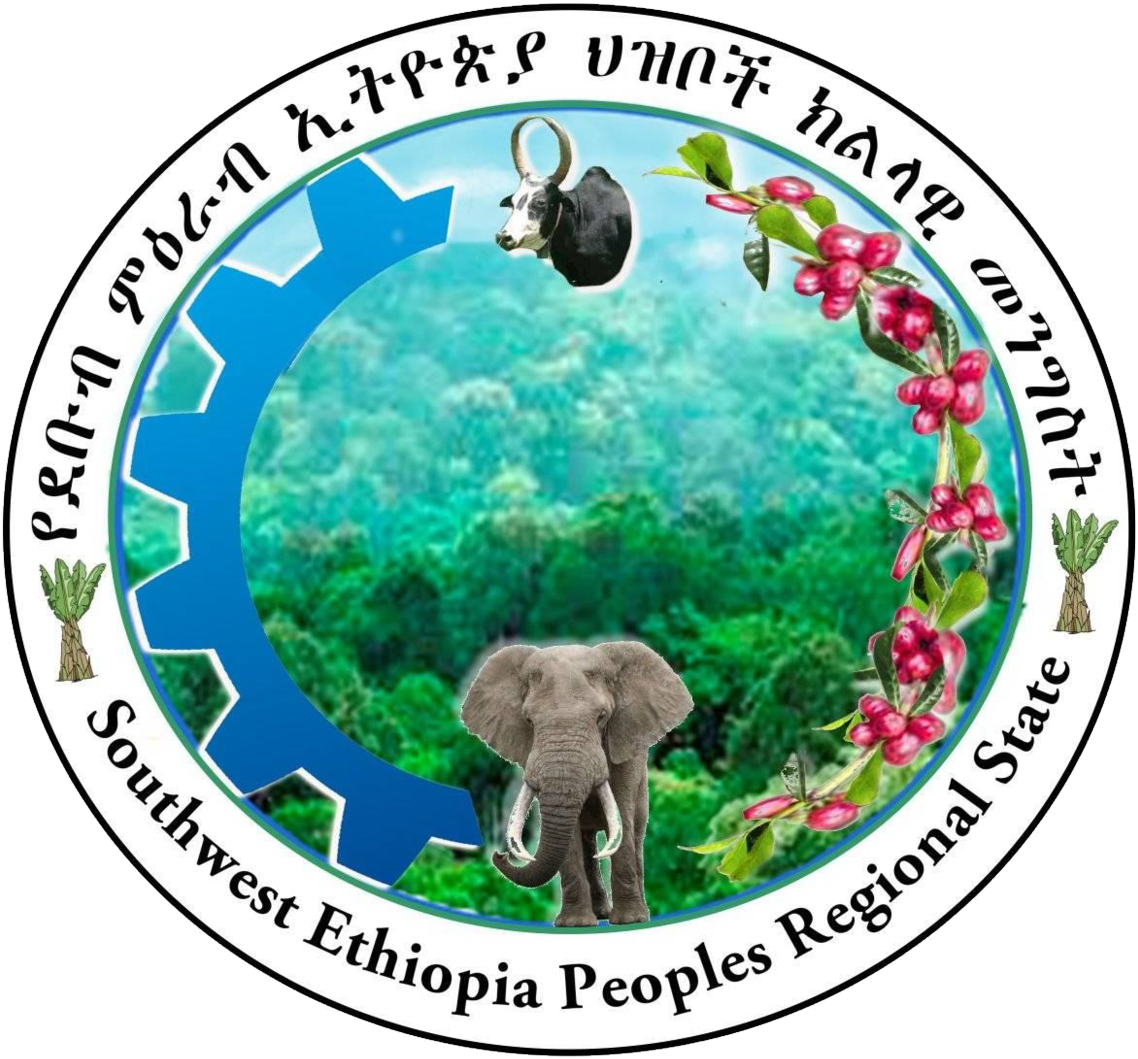
- Flag Seal

- Map of Ethiopia showing the South West Region
- Country: Ethiopia
- Capital: Bonga

Government
  - Chief Administrator: Fikire Aman
  - House Speaker: Wondimu Kurta

Area
  - Total: 39,400 km^{2} (15,200 sq mi)
  - Rank: 8th

Population (2025)
  - Total: 2,473,000
  - Rank: 7th
  - Density: 62.8/km^{2} (163/sq mi)
- ISO 3166 code: ET-SW

The Southwest Ethiopia Region, officially the Southwest Ethiopia Peoples' Regional State (Amharic: የደቡብ ምዕራብ ኢትዮጵያ ሕዝቦች ክልል, romanized: Yedebubi Mi‘irabi Ītiyop’iya Hizibochi Kilili) is a regional state in southwestern Ethiopia. It was split off from the Southern Nations, Nationalities, and Peoples' Region (SNNPR) on 23 November 2021 after a successful referendum.

It consists of the Keffa, Sheka, Bench Sheko, Dawro, West Omo Zones, and Konta Zone. The working language of the region is Amharic.

== Chief administrator ==
- Negash Wagesho (chief administrator) 2021–present

== Administrative zones ==
The following table shows administrative zones and special woredas, (an administrative subdivision which is similar to an autonomous area), is based on information from the 2007 census; the list of second administrative level bodies maintained by the United Nations Geographic Information Working Group dates from 2002,

Zones and special woredas in the Southwest Ethiopia Peoples's Regional State
Number/haddoo	Zone/Guudo	Seat/koto
1	Bench Sheko	Mizan Aman
2	Dawro Zone	Tarcha
3	Keffa Zone	Bonga
4	Sheka Zone	Tepi
5	West Omo Zone	Jemu
6	Konta Zone	Amaya
