= Hamero (woreda) =

Administrative subdivision of Ethiopia

Coordinates: 7°35′N 42°20′E

Hamero is one of the woredas in the Somali Region of Ethiopia, named after its major town, Hamero. Part of the Fiq Zone, Hamero is bordered on the south by Dihun, on the west by the Erer and Shebelle Rivers which separate it from Salahad and Lagahida, on the north by Fiq, and on the east by Segeg.

Hamero was one of three locations in the Somali Region on 12 November 2009, where about 200 Ogaden National Liberation Front fighters were killed in a clash with the Somali Regional New Police. Other reported locations were Higlaley in the Degehabur Zone and Riga in the Korahe Zone.

== Demographics ==
Based on the 2007 Census conducted by the Central Statistical Agency of Ethiopia (CSA), this woreda has a total population of 100,477, of whom 54,000 are men and 46,477 women. While 1,217 or 2.10% are urban inhabitants, a further 31,490 or 52.07% are pastoralists. 100% of the population said they were Muslim. This woreda is primarily inhabited by the Gadabursi clan and Ogaden clan of the Somali people.

The 1997 national census reported a total population for this woreda of 42,034, of whom 24,756 were men and 17,278 were women; 2,390 or 5.69% of its population were urban dwellers. The largest ethnic group reported in Hamero was the Somali (100%).

== Climate ==
Climate data for Hamero, elevation 750 m (2,460 ft), (1971–2000)
Month	Jan	Feb	Mar	Apr	May	Jun	Jul	Aug	Sep	Oct	Nov	Dec	Year
Mean daily maximum °C (°F)	34.3 (93.7)	35.1 (95.2)	35.4 (95.7)	34.3 (93.7)	32.6 (90.7)	32.4 (90.3)	32.2 (90.0)	32.2 (90.0)	34.4 (93.9)	33.9 (93.0)	33.7 (92.7)	33.9 (93.0)	33.7 (92.7)
Mean daily minimum °C (°F)	17.4 (63.3)	19.0 (66.2)	20.9 (69.6)	21.4 (70.5)	21.1 (70.0)	20.2 (68.4)	22.1 (71.8)	21.8 (71.2)	22.8 (73.0)	20.2 (68.4)	18.1 (64.6)	16.1 (61.0)	20.1 (68.2)
Average precipitation mm (inches)	6.0 (0.24)	9.0 (0.35)	23.0 (0.91)	80.0 (3.15)	102.0 (4.02)	12.0 (0.47)	1.0 (0.04)	2.0 (0.08)	26.0 (1.02)	37.0 (1.46)	10.0 (0.39)	2.0 (0.08)	310 (12.21)
Source: FAO
