= Kebri Beyah (woreda) =

City in Somali Region, Ethiopia

Kebri Beyah Qabri Bayax
- City
- Nickname: KB
- Location Ethiopia
- Coordinates: 9°21′N 42°48′E
- Country: Ethiopia
- Region: Somali
- Established: l

Government
  - Type: City Administration Mayor = Khalid Mohamed
- Elevation: 1,609 m (5,279 ft)

Population (2023)
  - Total: 543,272
- Time zone: UTC+3 (EAT)
- Postal Code: 3050
- Area code: +251
- Website: https://unhabitat.org/kebribeyah-settlement-profile-somali-region-ethiopia

Kebri Beyah (Somali: Qabribayax) is a city and woreda in Somali Region, Ethiopia. Part of the Kebri Beyah is bordered on the south by the Degehabur Zone, on the southwest by the Fiq Zone, on the northwest by Gursum, on the north by Jijiga and Awbare, on the northeast by Somaliland, and on the east by Harshin. The City administrative center is Kebri Beyah City.

The average elevation in this woreda is 1530 meters above sea level. The only perennial rivers in Kebri Beyah are the Fafen and the Jerer. As of 2008, Kebri Beyah has 55 kilometers of asphalt road, 48 of all-weather gravel road and 2642 kilometers of community roads; about 13.1% of the total population has access to drinking water.

The Ethiopian De-mining Office reported in November 2008 that it had cleared land mines planted in Kebri Beyah as part of the four million square meters of land the office had cleared in the Somali Region.

== Demographics ==
Based on the 2007 Census conducted by the Central Statistical Agency of Ethiopia (CSA), this woreda has a total population of 165,518, of whom 89,703 are men and 75,815 women. While 25,493 or 15.4% are urban inhabitants, a further 19,806 or 11.97% are pastoralists. 98.77% of the population said they were Muslim.

There are 16,353 refugees from Somalia living at Kebri Beyah refugee camp.

The 1997 national census reported a total population for this woreda of 162,474, of whom 85,974 were men and 76,500 women; 23,725 or 14.6% of its population were urban dwellers. As it's reported in 2023 the largest ethnic group reported in Kebri Beyah was the Somali people with 540,456 or 99.0% of the total population being of Somali origin.

== Refugee camp ==
Kebri Beyah has been the site of a refugee camp since 1989. The camp originally housed about 10,000 refugees and returnees from Somalia, It was the only camp in the Somali Region to remain open while the United Nations High Commissioner for Refugees (UNHCR) was able to close down the other camps in the region between 1997 and 2005. By 2005, the UNHCR expected to close the Kebri Beyah camp soon as well. However, the greater influx of refugees from south-central Somalia led to the growth of the camp up to 16,000 or 17,000 inhabitants. In 2007, 4,000 refugees were relocated from Kebri Beyah to Teferi Ber where a former camp was partially re-opened.

== Agriculture ==
A sample enumeration performed by the CSA in 2001 interviewed 17,209 farmers in this woreda, who held an average of 1.15 hectares of land. Of the 19.8 square kilometers of private land surveyed, 75.11% was under cultivation, 11.21% pasture, 12.4% fallow, and 1.29% was devoted to other uses; the area in woodland is missing. For the land surveyed in this woreda, 61.29% was planted in cereals like teff, sorghum and maize, and 0.53% in pulses; the area planted in root crops and vegetables is missing. Permanent crops included 2539 hectares planted in khat, and 41.84 in fruit trees. 88.59% of the farmers both raised crops and livestock, while 4.29% only grew crops and 7.11% only raised livestock. Land tenure in this woreda was distributed amongst 98.02% owning their land, 0.94% renting, and the remaining 1.04% holding their land under other forms of tenure.
