= Jijiga (woreda) =

District in Somali Region, Ethiopia

Coordinates: 9°20′N 42°50′E

Jijiga (Somali: Jigjiga) is one of the woredas in the Somali Region of Ethiopia. Part of the Jijiga Zone, Jijiga is bordered on the south by Kebri Beyah, on the southwest by Gursum, on the southeast by Ajersagora, on the northwest by the Sitti Zone, and on the north by Awbare. Towns and cities in this woreda include Jijiga.

The average elevation in this woreda is 1803 meters above sea level. The only perennial rivers in this woreda are the Fafen and the Jerer. As of 2008, Jijiga has 80 kilometers of asphalt road and 60 kilometers of all-weather gravel road; about 34.1% of the total population has access to drinking water. The Karamara mountain to the west of the city of Jijiga were thoroughly mined during the Ogaden War, and there are still dangerous areas which have been marked off limits.

Prior to the 2004 October referendum, which established the disputed boundary between the Oromia and Somali Regions, a large section in the north of this woreda became the Chinaksen woreda, which was transferred to the Oromia Region.

== Demographics ==
Based on the 2007 Census conducted by the Central Statistical Agency of Ethiopia (CSA), this woreda has a total population of 277,560, of whom 149,292 are men and 128,268 women. While 125,876 or 45.35% are urban inhabitants, a further 6,956 or 2.51% are pastoralists. 91.41% of the population said they were Muslim, and 6.97% were Orthodox Christian. This diverse woreda is primarily inhabited by the Somali the Gadabuursi, Ogaden, Abaskuul, Bartire and Yabare subclans of the Jidwaq, Geri Koombe, Habr Awal and Garhajis of the Isaaq and Sheekhaal. The 1997 national census reported a total population for this woreda of 269,096, of whom 138,483 were men and 130,613 were women; 73,548 or 27.33% of its population were urban dwellers. The largest ethnic group reported in Jijiga was the Somali 138,483 (99.9%).

== Agriculture ==
A sample enumeration performed by the CSA in 2001 interviewed 37,413 farmers in this woreda, who held an average of 1.05 hectares of land. Of the 39.37 square kilometers of private land surveyed, 81.21% was under cultivation, 10.6% pasture, 3.72% fallow, and 1.8% was devoted to other uses; the percentage in woodland is missing. For the land under cultivation in Jijiga, 66.08% is planted in cereals like teff, sorghum and maize, 1.61% in pulses, 1.61% in root crops, and 0.07% in vegetables. Permanent crops included 4108 hectares planted in khat, 1 in enset, and 14.55 in fruit trees. 78.33% of the farmers both raise crops and livestock, while 19.88% only grow crops and 1.79% only raise livestock. Land tenure in this woreda is distributed amongst 94.28% owned their land, 1.29% rented, and the remaining 4.43% held their land under other forms of tenure.
