= Dimitrie Ghica-Comănești =

Romanian nobleman, explorer, famous hunter, adventurer and politician

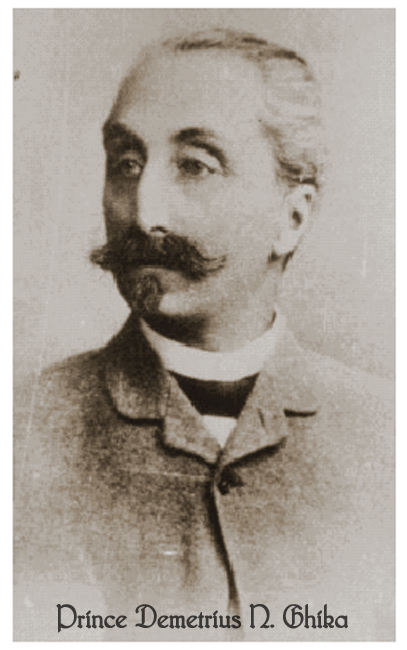
Ghika in 1898

Dimitrie Ghica-Comănești (also Demeter Ghica, Ghica Comăneșteanu, Prince Ghica de Roumanie; 31 December 1839 – 1923) was a Romanian nobleman, explorer, famous hunter, adventurer and politician. He was born into the Ghica family, with nobiliary and ethnic Albanian ancestry roots beginning in the 17th century. He was the son of Ecaterina Plagino (1820–1881) and aga (Rom. archaic – Chief of Justice) Nicolae Ghica, boyar (b. 1798 in Iași, d. 1853 in Comănești), from whom he inherited the estate domains of Comănești and Palanca, two of the ten his father had. He graduated a law degree from the Humboldt University of Berlin, and pursued his career as prefect of Bacău County, magistrate, and member of the Chamber of Deputies of Romania between 1872 and 1892 and further as royal adviser.

Like his father, since childhood he was an avid outdoor enthusiast, and educated himself about nature, only to become later a prominent member of the Romanian Geographical Society, one of the very firsts in the world, founded in 1875. He remarked himself in studies of zoology, botany and geology, geography and topography. He married Zoe Lahovary (1851–1902). They had one son, Nicolae Ghica (1875–1921), who followed in his father's path. He was chairman and president of the Senate. Also they had a daughter, Maria (1870–1952), married Prince Leon Mavrocordato (1858–1939), military attaché in Vienna.

Like many other Eastern European explorers, the Ghicas were of noble blood, high education and considerable family wealth, major factors that fuelled their bold ventures. After the opening of Suez Canal in late 1869, a new era in African exploration has begun, specially after British took control of the canal in 1882, when sea trips to Africa from Europe via Mediterranean Sea became very common. However, few people ventured past the relative comforts of the cities and trade zones, and the ones that did, for the most part, were murdered, like Lieutenant Stroyan, Pietro Sacconi in 1883, the Greek merchant Panaghiotis, the Italian Count Gianpetro Porro in 1883, while others killed by wild beasts, like Prince Eugene Ruspoli in 1891, who found his end trampled by an angry elephant. Ones that did were adventurous spirits with hunting or exploration in mind. The Ghicas, father and son, between 1894 and 1895, had ventured deeper than any European in the Horn of Africa, crossing today's Ethiopia, Djibouti, and Somalia, where they made notable geographical explorations and natural history discoveries.

Their exploits on the African continent are typical for the upper class of the Victorian era, filled with safaris and extensive hunting of exotic species. The Ghicas sailed from Europe on the Imperatrix to Aden, then crossed into Africa at the port of Berbera, at the time the capital of British Somaliland, and on 22 October 1894 a massive caravan of over seventy luggage camels, four horses, two mules and three donkeys serving as lion bait, not counting hordes of sheep and goats for food, parted on a journey that will last almost a half year in the interior of the continent. The caravan crew consisted of 53 porters, few scouts from local tribes, four shikari hunting guides, two valets and the two Ghicas. They crossed the Gouban plains, traversed the Ogo plateau, to the Shebelle River and the north range of the Mountains of the Moon. After crossing the Somalian highlands they entered northern Ethiopia, where they started intensive hunting, collecting specimens. The Ghicas were seasoned big game hunters already from back home, Romania, where they pursued trophy brown bears in the Carpathian Mountains, stags and wild boars at the Dofteana estate where his family had a hunting chateau, or in the Danube Delta, enjoying fishing and hunting as a favorite pastime. The plants and animals collected during their African expedition were sent to private but mostly academic collections, notably the Grigore Antipa National Museum of Natural History, located in Bucharest. An account of the hunting species, very grave by modern standards, quotes their exploits at: four lions (including the two man-eaters of Del-Marodile), five elephants, fifteen crocodiles, around a dozen rhinos, one giraffe (a new subpecie), two panthers, seven hyaenas, fifteen zebras, three wild asses (onagers), two greater kudu, eleven lesser kudus, eight hartebeest, twenty five oryx antelopes (gemsbok), eight warthogs, around one hundred different gazelles plus foxes, jackals, monkeys. Even though avid hunters, they did not neglect flora, and their discoveries are well-noted in their Plantarum enumeratio et descriptio work with names like Loranthua ghikae, Ghikea spectabilis or Ipomoea ghika and other names titillating Romanian royalty were given to the new sixteen species of plants discovered by them; they even discovered a new botanical genus which the German savants named Ghikae in their honor. Members of the Romanian Geographic Society, they made keen and pertinent descriptions of the flora, fauna, geology and the people they encountered and compiled maps.

The analogy of their adventures to the later ones of United States President Theodore Roosevelt and his son, Kermit Roosevelt, in East Africa, to much extent is striking.

The first book about the Ghicas' African voyage, published in German and French in 1898 in Geneva, was Cinq mois aux pays des Somalis, written by G. A. Schweinfuhrt, G. Volkens, and Nicolae D. Ghica. Prior and after that, notable academic institutions throughout Europe published articles and recorded their deeds, including the British Royal Geographic Society. Another book was Un voyage en Afrique (A Voyage in Africa - French and Romanian).

In 1908, Ghikaea speciosa, a species of plant, from Ethiopia, Somalia and northern Kenya, was named after the Ghicas.

The Ghicas' passion for hunting was remarkable, both father and son being noted as acquiring world record game trophies not only at home in Romania of European stag Cervus elaphus but also Africa's plains or dangerous game including: elephant, black rhino, oryx, kudu, waterbuck and gazelles, according to Rowland Ward (Records of Big Game, third edition, London).

Prior to his dramatic suicide in 1921, his son Nicolae continued passionately hunting and venturing the world, further in the sultanate of Morocco and the Saharan desert in 1899 and later, in 1910, to Canada and Alaska, all the way to Kodiak Island, probably drawn in pursuit by the world's largest land carnivore, the Kodiak grizzly.

Two years after his son, Nicolae, committed suicide, Dimitrie Ghica died in 1923 and was buried together with his family and son near his estate in Comănești, Romania, at the St. Spiridon church cemetery.

His estate's residence, the Ghica Chateau (or Palatul Ghica), built in 1880 in late Baroque style by the French architect Albert Galleron (also designer of the Romanian National Bank and the Romanian Atheneum), still stands, today serving as Dimitrie Ghica Museum of Ethnography and Contemporary Art ("Dimitrie N. Ghika Comănești"). The museum is host to a popular arts and crafts collection and a section of contemporary Romanian beaux-arts. Adjacent to the chateau, a 19-acre dendrological park boasts rare, exotic, and decorative species of trees from Asia and North America.

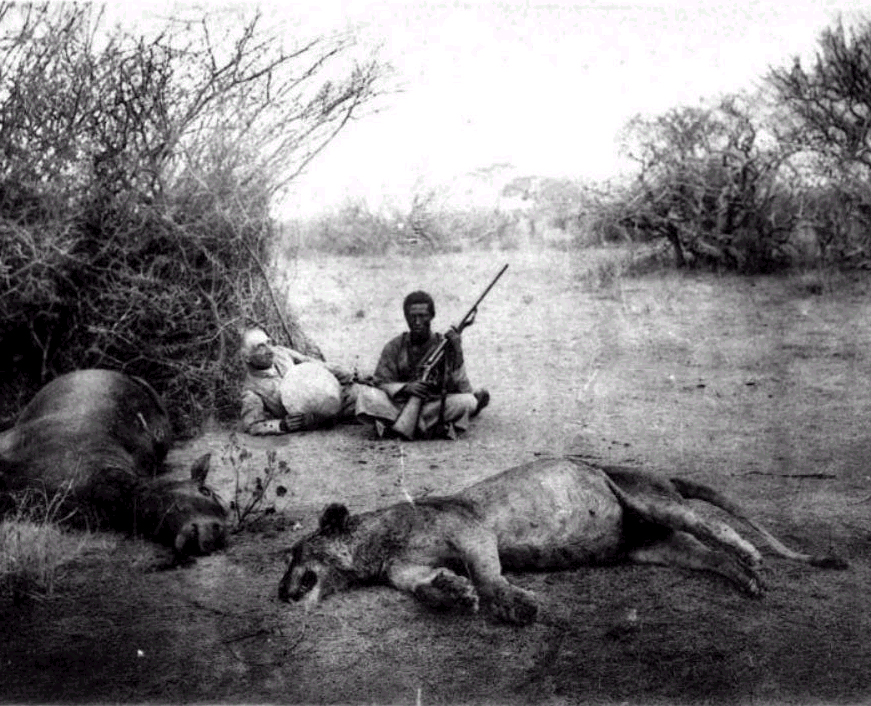
Prince Dimitrie Ghica with his man-eating lion trophy at Del-Marodile, 1894, Somaliland. Note the mule for bait.

Prince Ghica's son, Nicolae posing with his fourth rhino, Somalia 1895.

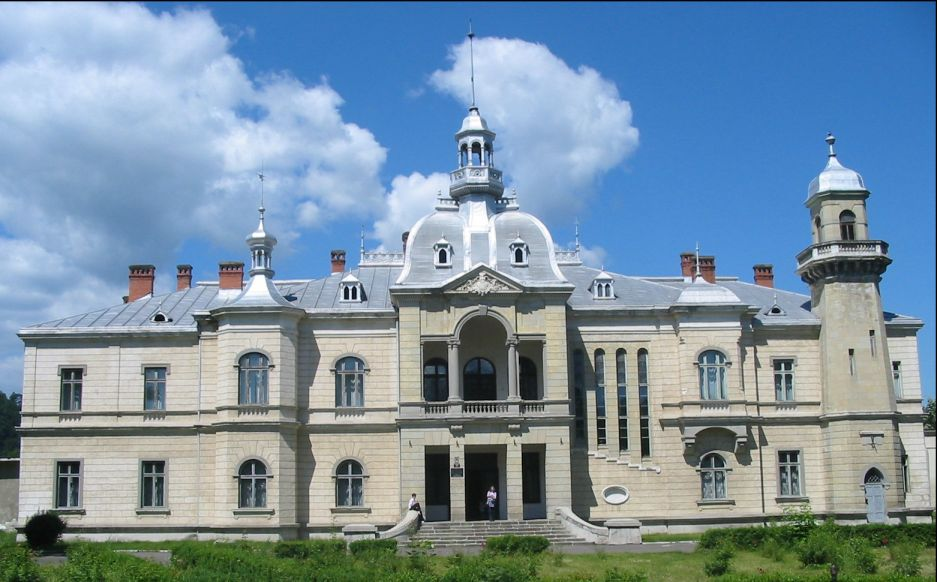
The Ghica Chateau at Comănești estate, Romania.

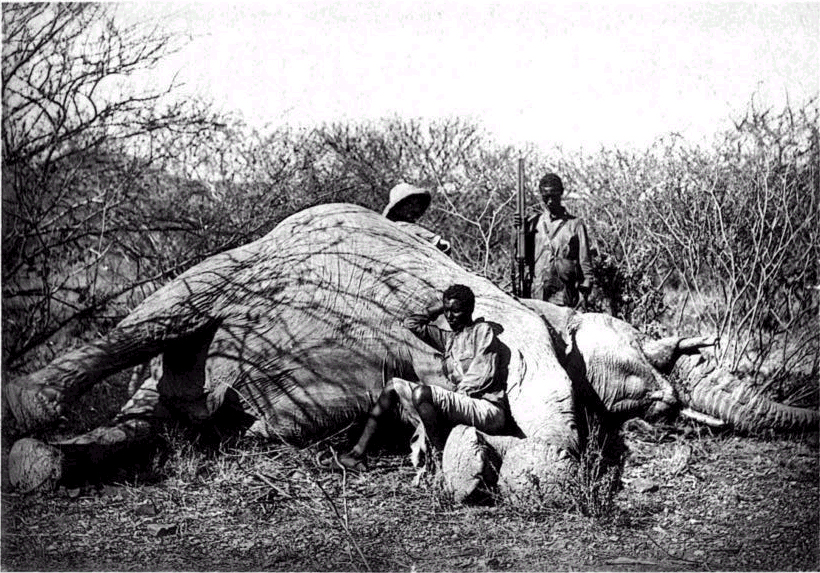
Prince D. Ghica with slain bull elephant and two African servants, Somalia 1895.

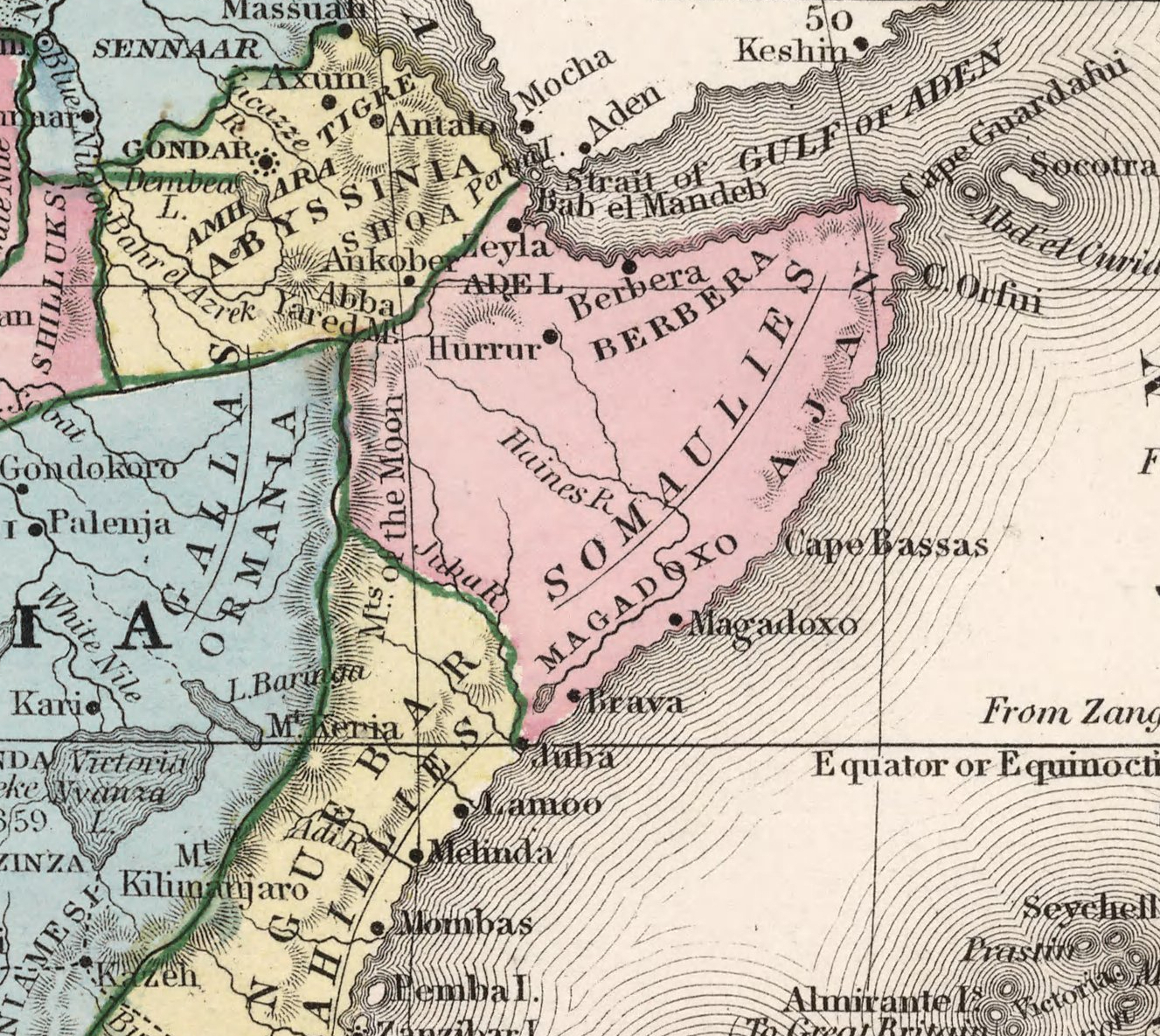
Mitchell, S. Map of Africa, Philadelphia 1867 Horn of Africa detail, where the Ghica expedition took place.

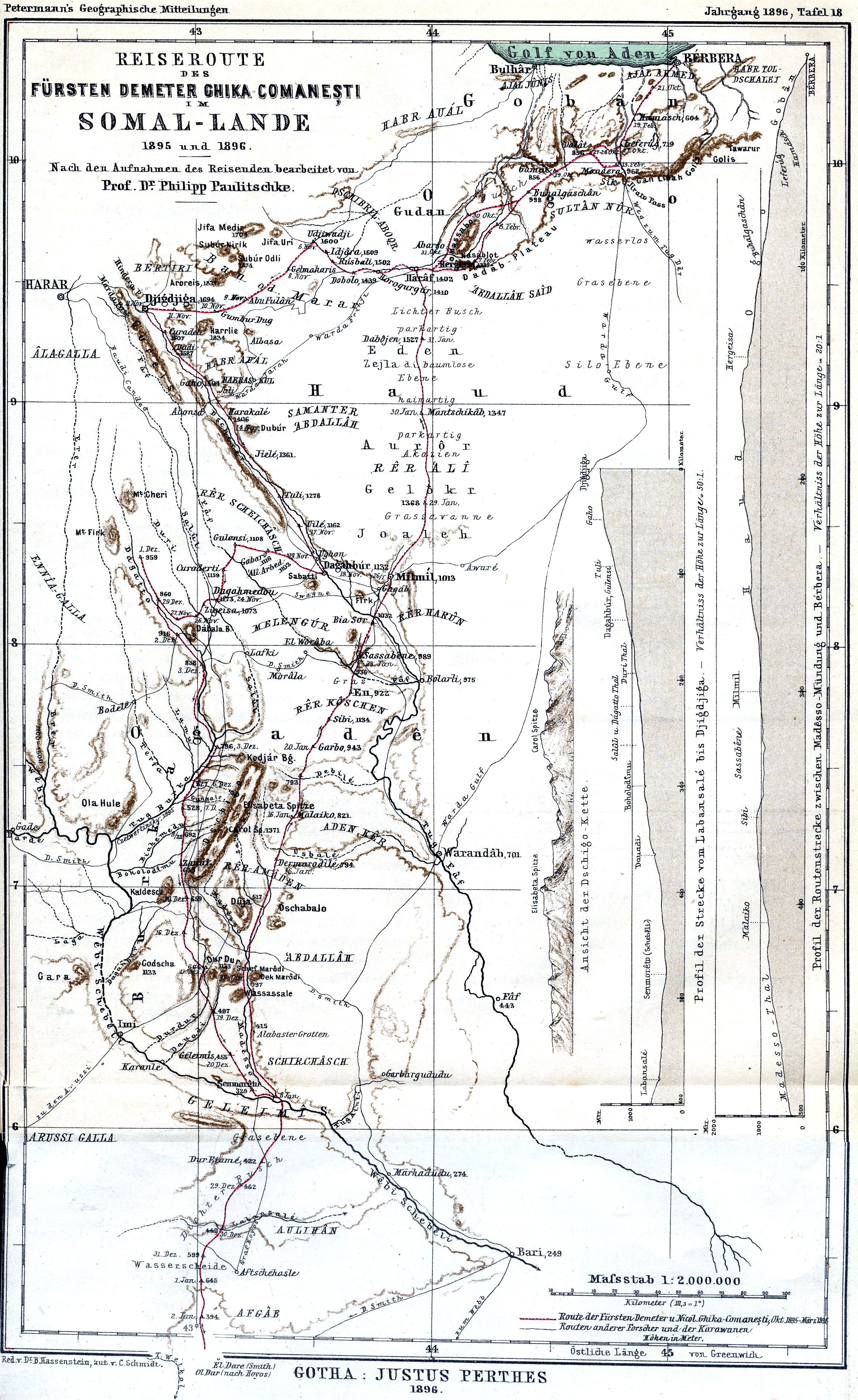
The route of the expedition

== Timeline of the Ghica expedition in Somaliland ==
1895

22 October – Started crossing Ogaden coastal plains, moving into the arid deserts of Gouban

25 October – The high plateaus of ‘Ogo then the Haud country

27 October – Leferoug

29 October – Bouhalgachan, oryx hunts

30 October – Reached fortress of Hargeysa where he met Sheik Mattar trying to avoid Abyssinian troops of King Menelik expedition changes course further south through the country of Aniya Oromo tribes, tributaries of Menelik, less violent

2 November – Closer to the Abyssinian border, the Ghicas kill their first lions on a close encounter

4 November – Reaching Harar mountains, entering in the Ethiopian Alps

9 November – Prairies and forests of Harar

14 November – Reaching fortress of Jijiga

19 November – Mount Sabatwein, after crossing Jerer and Fafen Rivers, where the father was almost killed by a charging rhino during a hunt

24 November – Crossing Fafen river

25 November – Reached Degehamedo

30 November – Daghato river region hunting panthers and Nicolas has a close escape from an angry bull elephant in the highland forests.

6 December – Mountains of Kaldech, Khodjar and Djigo

21 December – Crossing Shebeli River (Leopards River)

27 December – Venturing into a never explored land of the Aulihan tribes

31 December – Entering the Oromo country and discoveries of the alabaster cave, and hunted first giraffe

1896

5 January – At the confluence of Webu with Madesso, they adopt a child, the last survivor of a Geleimis Somali village completely massacred by Abyssinian warriors.

8 January – Discovered another impressive alabaster cave and named her after the Princess Marie of Romania

9 January – Dek-Marodi and Ouasasale (Wasasali) mountains

13 January – Enter the Del-Marodile and killed the two man-eating lions that ravaged the village

21 January – Crossed the fertile plains of En and Sibi

23 January – Entered the country of Melengour tribes of Somalis, villages of Sassabene

24 January – Biosoro Mountains

25 January – Entering the Haud plateau, helped the Sheik of the Habr Awal retrieve his stolen livestock by the Rer-Ali tribe

5 February – Rest at Hargeisa, then head north crossing Mt. Gah-Liba, Mt. Golis, Rock of The Seven Thieves and then entered Mandeira

20 February – Arrived at the port of Berbera

Timeline was based on the book Cinq mois aux pays des Somalis by Nicolae Ghica, G. A. Schweinfuhrt and G. Volkens, in Geneva, 1898
