= Mayumuluka =

Mayumuluka is one of the woredas (districts) in the Somali Region of Ethiopia. Part of the Fiq Zone, Mayumuluka is bordered on the south by Lagahida, on the west and north by the Oromia Region, on the northeast by the Jijiga Zone, and on the east by the Erer which separates it from Fiq.

== Demographics ==
Based on the 2007 Census conducted by the Central Statistical Agency of Ethiopia (CSA), this woreda has a total population of 99,907, of whom 62,107 are men and 37,805 women. While 4,157 or 34.91% are urban inhabitants, a further 5,392 or 45.28% are pastoralists. 99.21% of the population said they were Muslim.
