= 2018 East Africa floods =

Floods in 7 east African countries in 2018

2018 East Africa Floods
- Date: March–June 2018
- Location: Rwanda, Kenya, Somalia, Burundi, Djibouti, Ethiopia, Uganda
- Deaths: ~500

The 2018 East Africa Floods were a natural disaster in Kenya, Ethiopia, Uganda, Rwanda, Somalia, Djibouti, and Burundi affecting millions of people. They began when excessive rains began falling in March 2018 following a year of severe drought, leading to massive flooding, landslides, and the failure and overflow of several dams. Record rainfall was recorded in several areas, surpassing various records set during the 1950s and during the 1997–98 El Niño event. Nearly 500 people have lost their lives while hundreds of thousands of others have been displaced.

== Impact by country ==
=== Rwanda ===
Flooding in Rwanda's hill country has caused major landslides that have killed at least 200 people. Over 10,000 houses have been destroyed.

In May the Kigali-Gatuna highway, a major road connecting Rwanda to its neighbors, was washed out for nearly a week, cutting off vital trade for the landlocked country. Damages to the roads alone across Rwanda have so far totaled $28 Million.

=== Kenya ===
The year 2018 Long rainy season (March-May) was considered one of the wettest periods that led to massive economic and social losses at least according to post event analysis. During this period at least 186 people in Kenya were killed by the floods due to mudslides, building collapses, drowning, and capsizing. An additional 283,290 people were displaced. The floods were a contributing factor to the Patel Dam failure on 9 May, 2018 in Solai, Kenya, which led to 48 of the fatalities in Kenya. Four additional dams near Lake Baringo burst on May 26, killing another 5 people and displacing another 10,000.

Repairs to road damages in Kenya are currently estimated to cost $187 Million.

=== Somalia ===
Initial bouts of flooding throughout April and early May killed 5 people, displaced 215,000 people, and affected over 630,000 people in Somalia. Most flooding has occurred along the Jubba and Shabelle rivers, an example of the Somali Flash Flood effect.

More floods were experienced between May 17 and 21 as Somalia was hit by Cyclone Sagar, the westernmost landfalling cyclone on record in the North Indian Ocean. 31 people were killed, most of them in Somaliland where 80% of the livestock were also killed.

=== Burundi ===
In March, floods in Bujumbura triggered landslides that killed 6 people and affected 12,000 others. Continued flooding throughout April caused a dyke along the Mutumbizi River to fail and ultimately left 1 person dead and 2,573 people homeless. Heavy rainfall throughout May around Gatumba led to massive flooding that affected an additional 12,956 people.

=== Djibouti ===
Djibouti experienced its worst flooding when hit by Cyclone Sagar, which made landfall on May 19. 20,000 people have been affected and 2 have died.

=== Ethiopia ===
In Ethiopia 98,000 individuals have been displaced, including 26,000 in Dolo Odo alone. Over 165,000 people have been affected across the country.

=== Uganda ===
In Uganda, massive flooding in Kampala has exacerbated several public health crises as latrines have flooded in poor areas and standing flood waters have led to greater breeding of mosquitos. This has multiplied a local cholera outbreak that began in February 2018 and has killed 45 people and affected 2000 others.
