= Fiq (woreda) =

District in Somali Region, Ethiopia

Coordinates: 8°10′N 42°20′E

Fiq (Somali: Fiiq) is a woreda in Somali Region, Ethiopia, named after its major town, Fiq. Part of the Fiq Zone, Fiq is bordered on the south by Hamero, on the western Qubi, on the west by Mayumuluka, on the north by the Jijiga Zone, on the east by the Degehabur Zone, and on the southeast by Segeg; the woreda's western boundary is defined by the Erer River.

The average elevation in this woreda is 1035 meters above sea level. As of 2008, Ayesha has 40 kilometers of all-weather gravel road and 451 kilometers of community roads; about 9.11% of the total population has access to drinking water.

== Demographics ==
Based on the 2007 Census conducted by the Central Statistical Agency of Ethiopia (CSA), this woreda has a total population of 68,047, of whom 36,037 are men and 32,011 are women and 68,060 women. While 9.31% are urban inhabitants, a further 56.68% are pastoralists. 99.3% of the population said they were Muslim. This woreda is primarily inhabited by the Ogaden rer ugaas samatar ( malingour ) clan.

The 1997 national census reported a total population for this woreda of 12,961, of whom 6,684 were men and 6277 were women; 46% of its population were urban dwellers. (This total also includes an estimate for the inhabitants of 3 rural kebeles, which were not counted; they were estimated to have 1,225 inhabitants, of whom 676 were men and 549 women.) The largest ethnic group reported in Fiq were Abdille clan of the larger ogaden of the Somalis (99.84%).
