= Dihun =

District in Somali Region, Ethiopia

Coordinates: 7°15′N 42°35′E

Dihun is a woreda in Somali Region, Ethiopia. Part of the Nogob Zone, Dihun is bordered on the south by the Gode Zone, on the west by the Shebelle River which separates it from Salahad, on the northwest by Hamero, on the northeast by Segeg, and on the east by Gerbo. The major town in Dihun is Geresley.

The average elevation in this woreda is around 859 meters above sea level. As of 2008, Dihun has neither all-weather gravel roads nor community roads; around 9.11% of the total population has access to drinking water.

== Demographics ==
- Based on the 2007 Census conducted by the Central Statistical Agency of Ethiopia, this woreda has a total population of 1003,302 of whom 64,404 are men and 35,898 women. While 22,160 or 18.84% are urban inhabitants, a further 78,340 or 37.24% are pastoralists. 100% of the population said they were Muslim. This woreda is primarily inhabited by the Darod clan of the Somali people. The werada is mainly dominated by Ogaden subclans of Maxamed Subeer, especially Reer Cabdille Reer Amaadin, especially jeeraar The most important natural feature are Qarri Juqod mountains which are a very long chain of mountains. some of the seasonal rivers in the area are Ssamane, Dawadiid, Faarayse, and Cusbalay. In addition, Badhaxlay, Laqanyo, Biyajanale, Ciiralay, Waadhi, and Bali Caroog are also water source called yaaxeen. Garbo arah (natural salt source), dhoobaale (water source mostly for camels) godcaruusaad, darbi-balanbal are also some of the natural features in the area. The highest points in terms of elevation in Qarri Juqood mountains are cirey, dulhawd and qul_qul. The seven well mentioned part of the mountain (Qarri-Juqood) are Dulhawd, Ciray, Cooldanlay, Qoofallay, Saalunlay, Habargaylo, and Dulcaanood.

The 1997 national census reported a total population for this woreda of 28,259, of whom 15,572 were men and 12,687 were women; 1,148 or 4.06% of its population were urban dwellers. (This total also includes an estimate for the inhabitants of 8 rural kebeles, which were not counted; they were estimated to have 8,135 inhabitants, of whom 4,484 were men and 3,651 women.) The largest ethnic group reported in Dihun was the Somali (100%).
