= Lagahida =

Lagahida is one of the woredas in the Somali Region of Ethiopia. Part of the Erer Zone, Lagahida is bordered by Salahad to the south and west, the Oromia Region to the north, and the Erer and Shebelle rivers to the east, which separates it from Hamero.

== Demographics ==
Based on the 2007 Census conducted by the Central Statistical Agency of Ethiopia (CSA), Lagahida had a total population of 787,415, of whom 448,633 (56.9%) were men and 338,782 (43.1%) were women. While 131,861 (16.7%) were urban inhabitants, a further 629,932 (80%) were pastoralists. The whole population was Muslim.

Lagahida is primarily inhabited by the Arsi Oromo clan and the Karanle Hawiye.
