= Gursum =

Gursum may refer to several places and things in Ethiopia:

- Gursum, Oromia (Aanaa), a woreda in Oromia Region
- Gursum, Somali (woreda), in Somali Region
- Gursum (meteorite), a 1981 meteorite fall in Hararghe
