= Gerbo (woreda) =

District in Somali Region, Ethiopia

Coordinates: 7°35′N 42°55′E

Gerbo is a woreda in Somali Region, Ethiopia, named after its major town, Gerbo. Part of the Nogob Zone (formerly the Fiq Zone), Gerbo is bounded on the northwest by Segeg, on the north by the Degehabur Zone, on the East by the Korahe Zone, on the south by the Gode Zone, and on the West by Dihun.

In January 2007, the Ogaden National Liberation Front struck in this woreda, killing five local officials who refused to hand over heavy weapons to the rebels.

== Demographics ==
Based on the 2007 Census conducted by the Central Statistical Agency of Ethiopia, this woreda has a total population of 89,800, of whom are 44,795 men and 45,005 women. While 13,336 or 14.85% are urban inhabitants, a further 76,798 or 85.15% are pastoralists. 99.43% of the population said they were Muslim The largest inhabitants are Ogaden clan sub-clan of Mohamed Subeer, Ugaas Kooshin

The 1997 national census reported a total population for this woreda of 69,800, of whom 25,504 were men and 34,295 were women; 32,225 or 28.48% of its population were urban dwellers. (This total also includes an estimate for the inhabitants of 3 rural kebeles, which were not counted; they were estimated to have 1,294 inhabitants, of whom 688 were men and 606 women.) The largest ethnic group reported in Gerbo was the Somali (99.31%).
