= Segeg =

Coordinates: 7°30′N 42°40′E

Sageg is one of the woredas in the Somali Region of Ethiopia, named after its major town, Sageg. Part of the Nogob Zone, Sageg is bordered on the south by Dihun, on the west by Hamero, on the north by Yahob, on the northeast by the Jarar Zone, and on the southeast by Gerbo.

== Demographics ==
Based on the 2007 Census conducted by the Central Statistical Agency of Ethiopia (CSA), this woreda has a total population of 83,587 people. This woreda is primarily inhabited by the Ogaden Mohamed zuber, Ugaas Samatar ( Maalinguur) clan.

The 1997 national census reported a total population for this woreda of 83,587 (This total also includes an estimate for the inhabitants of 22 rural kebeles, which were not counted; they were estimated to have 3,806 inhabitants, of whom 2,107 were men and 1,699 women.) The largest ethnic group reported in Segeg was the Somali (99.98%).
