= Patel Dam failure =

2018 failure of an embankment dam in Kenya

Coordinates: 00°05′50″S 36°08′45″E

Patel Dam Failure
- Date: 9 May 2018
- Location: Solai, Nakuru County, Kenya
- Cause: 2018 East Africa floods
- Deaths: 48

The Patel Milmet Dam was a privately owned embankment dam located near the township of Solai, Nakuru County, in Kenya's Rift Valley. The dam burst amid heavy rains on 9 May 2018, killing at least 48 people.

== Background ==
Patel Dam

The Milmet dam was one of five earthen embankment dams belonging to Mansukul Patel on the private property of his 1,400-hectare (3,500-acre) commercial rose farm and business, Solai Roses. The other dams were known as Main House, Moi, DO, and Tinderess. The Milmet dam had a capacity of 200,000 cubic meters, and the dams collectively had a capacity of 600 Million cubic meters. The company produces large numbers of cut flowers for shipping to Germany and the Netherlands. The farm was responsible for the maintenance of the dam. According to the general manager of the farm, the dams were between 15 and 20 years old at the time of the incident. An investigation is currently being conducted to determine whether or not the dams were built legally and according to safety standards.

Excessive rains began falling in March 2018 following a year of severe drought. This caused massive flooding in Kenya, Ethiopia, Uganda, and Somalia, affecting nearly a million people. Nearly 170 people in Kenya were killed in the floods which preceded and led to the breaking of the dam. The general manager of the farm stated that the rain had been particularly intense during the two days preceding the dam’s failure, and that resulting flood waters, carrying boulders and roots, had damaged the wall of the dam.

According to Koigi Wamwere, a former legislator from the area, residents complained about leaks and cracks in the Patel Dam a few days before its failure.

== Dam burst ==
The dam burst in the evening of 9 May 2018, just as many area families were beginning their evening meals. Residents reported hearing a loud bang immediately followed by the rushing of "a sea of water". 70 million litres (18 million US gallons) of water were unleashed, creating a wall of water about 1.5 metres (4 ft 11 in) high and 500 metres (1,600 ft) wide. The resulting flood carved a chasm through a hill, washed away power poles, destroyed buildings (including a school), and submerged the villages of Nyakinyua and Energy. Homes over a radius of nearly 2 kilometres (1.2 mi) were submerged.

== Aftermath ==
So far, 48 have been confirmed dead, of whom more than 20 were children according to the national Creepomane Reports. Kenya’s Interior Secretary Fred Matiang'i, who arrived the day after the disaster, stated that the death toll could be higher as the rescue teams are likely to recover more bodies from the mud and debris. Authorities believe more than 2,000 people were left homeless. The United Nations Office for the Coordination of Humanitarian Affairs warned that the flooding which contributed to the dam failure is expected to get worse with additional heavy rains forecast in Nakuru over the coming weeks.

Dam owner Patel released a statement on 15 May, six days after the disaster, expressing condolences to the affected family. He praised the government’s ongoing investigation and pledged his company’s continued cooperation. He also vowed to assist in providing resources for displaced families, many of whom worked for him on his farm.

On 16 May, one week after the disaster, an interdenominational mass and memorial service was held at an Africa Inland Mission Church in Solai near the site of the dam. The service was attended by Kenyan President Uhuru Kenyatta, First Lady Margaret Kenyatta, Deputy President William Ruto, Nakuru Governor Lee Kinyanjui and other prominent local and national public figures. In his remarks, President Kenyatta promised aid to displaced families and the processing of 1300 title deeds for affected residents. He also pledged government assistance in rebuilding schools, roads, and other infrastructure destroyed by the disaster. Dam owner Patel was not in attendance at the service, having been asked by local leaders not to attend due to security concerns. 41 of the victims were laid to rest in Solai immediately following the memorial service.

=== Rescue and recovery operation ===
An organized rescue operation was carried out in the days immediately following the dam failure. The rescue team was a joint effort involving the Kenya Defence Forces, Kenya Red Cross Society, the National Youth Service, and various local and regional police forces.

During the first day of the disaster response, forty people were rescued and taken to hospitals operated by the Kenya Red Cross and other local relief organizations. On May 14, the official government response team announced that the 38 individuals who had been reported missing of May 10 were accounted for, either found alive or identified among the 48 bodies recovered at that point. Nonetheless, many residents responded that they still had additional friends and family unaccounted for.

A temporary shelter was established for survivors in the Solai Boy's High School. The displaced there were provided with three months of living provisions and access to psychological counseling. On Saturday, May 19, 10 days after the disaster, the temporary shelter was closed so that school could resume the following Monday. 200 families were still at the shelter without any housing solutions at the time of the closure.

On May 13, the European Union's Humanitarian Aid office (ECHO) announced that they were sending $1.8 Million to assist in the disaster relief efforts.

=== Investigation ===
Matiang'i announced the government’s investigation into the incident. The initial work of the investigation is focused on determining the stability of the other six dams on the Patel property, as residents claimed that some of the other dams were already beginning to leak. The day following the disaster, the government began controlled draining of two of the dams that were deemed structurally unsound. This led to some alarm among local residents that another dam had broken.

The Director of Public Prosecutions ordered a police investigation into the incident to "establish cause and culpability if any" behind the dam failure within two weeks.

On May 11, 2018, Kenya's Water Resources Management Authority (WARMA) concluded that none of the dams on the property were properly licensed and were therefore illegal. Engineers with WARMA also noted that the remaining dams were unsafe due to structural weakness and the absence of any spillways for discharging extra waters. Based on these findings, the regional minister in charge of water has requested that the other dams on the property also be drained. The farm’s general manager has denied that the dams were built illegally.

On May 12, President Kenyatta directed WARMA to oversee a countrywide inspection of dams in coordination with county governments. The inspection is intended to ensure compliance with water safety laws and will focus on older dams specifically.
