= Lake Solai =

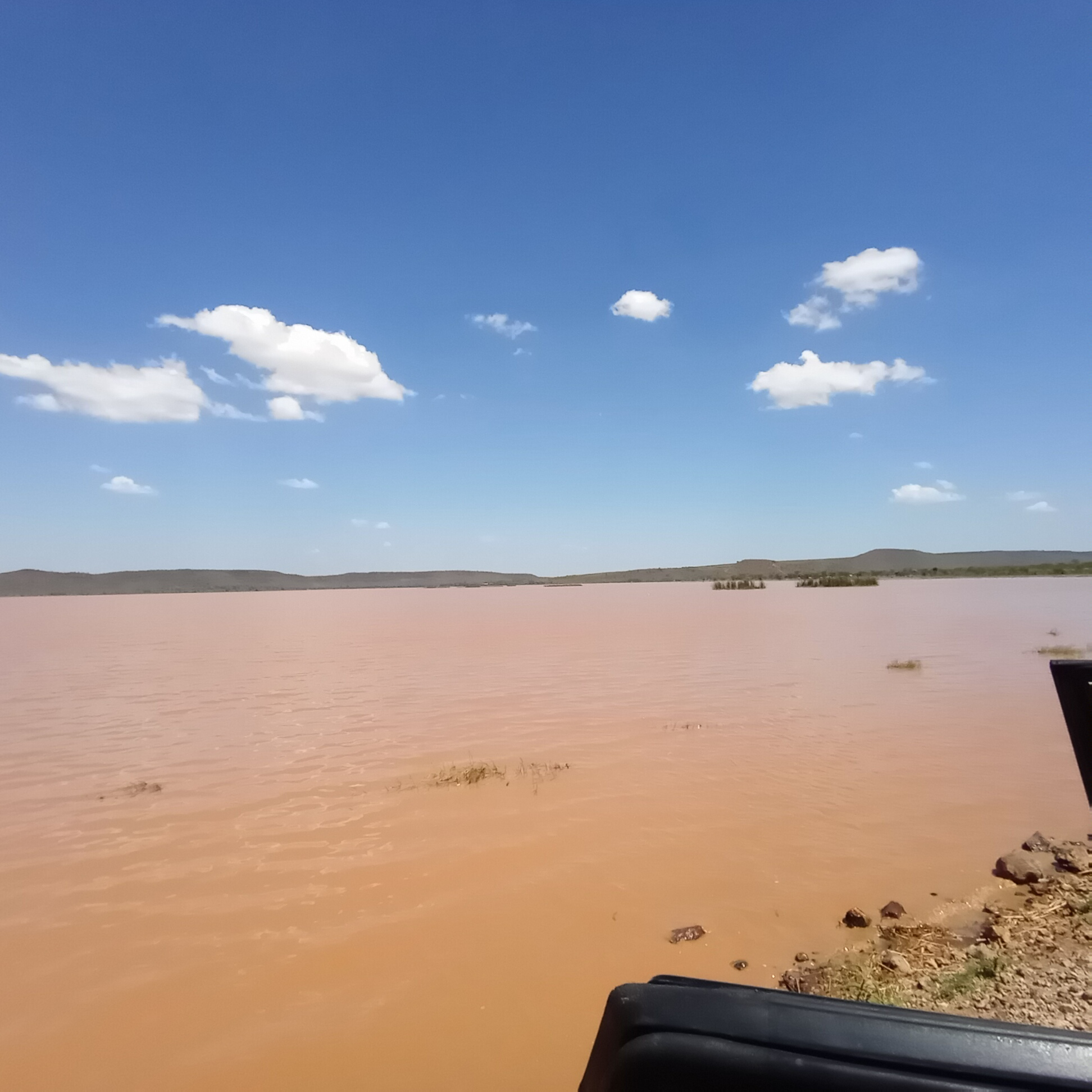

- Location within Kenya
- Location: Rift Valley Province, Kenya
- Coordinates: 0.06°N 36.15°E
- Type: salt lake

Lake Solai is a saltwater lake in the Rift Valley Province of Kenya. It is located near the town of Solai, at an elevation of 1,667 metres (5,469 ft). Geological conditions at the lake during the Little Ice Age have been the object of a scientific study.

In 2014 there was a major contamination event at the lake.

Nakuru county government has stocked the lake with fish and provided motor boats for fishing and tourism.
