= Somali Flash Floods =

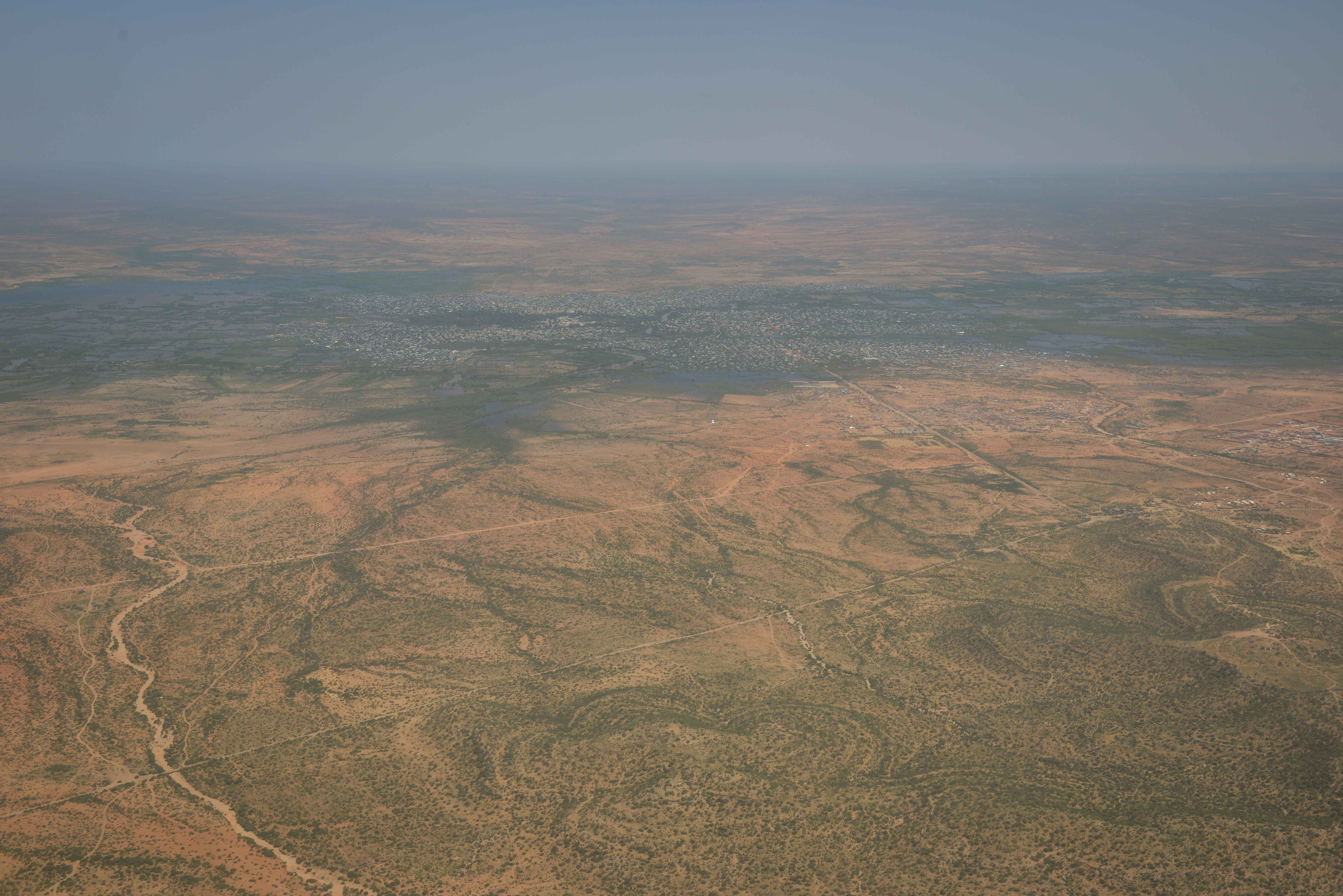
The town of Beledweyne flooded in 2016

The Somali Flash Floods are a group of flash floods that occur annually in the country of Somalia. The floods are a result of the Gu rains, which is the monsoon like rainfall that comes every March in the region. Every year, in the period shortly after the Gu rains from March to July, flash floods hit the lower Jubba and lower Shabelle regions of Somalia. These flash floods cause devastation and destruction, causing casualties and displacement. In recent years, the effects of the floods have increased compared to past floods. This is due to Somali population increase and continuing lack of preparation mechanisms, and they may be exemplified by meteorological reasons as well.

== Gu rains ==
Somali seasons include the Xagaa from July to September, the Dayr from October to December, the Jilal from December to March, and the Gu from late March to June. The Xagaa and Jilal seasons are notably dry, and can cause drought. Contrastingly, the Dayr and Gu seasons have the most rainfall, with the Gu being the heavier rain season of the two. The floods that shock the southeastern part of the nation are a result of the Gu rains that fall each year. The water from the rainfall flows to the lowlands near the Jubba River valley and the Shabelle River valley in the southwestern part of the nation. In addition, any excess water that runs down from the two rivers can also contribute to the water flow. The runoff then causes massive flooding for the communities in the area of the two river valleys. As the Gu rains fall every year, the Jubba River and Shabelle River Valleys are susceptible to flooding every year because of the terrain and climate of the area.

== Agricultural stimulus ==
In addition to flash floods, Somalia also suffers from severe droughts. The droughts that occur in the country have been labeled the "Worst Humanitarian Crisis". The droughts affect the agricultural production in the nation. Agriculture and livestock cultivation are a large contributor to Somalia's GDP. The main areas of agriculture are situated in the lowlands of the Jubba and Shabelle rivers. So, under normal circumstances, the Gu rains are looked upon with favor, as they end a long, dry period, and bring about a lush pasture in the lowlands where the rain runs off too. This rainfall makes farming easier, bringing nutrients for crop growth, and for wildlife to subsidize on. The floods bring refreshment to the drought affected farmland, and revitalize the soil for growth.

== Human impact ==
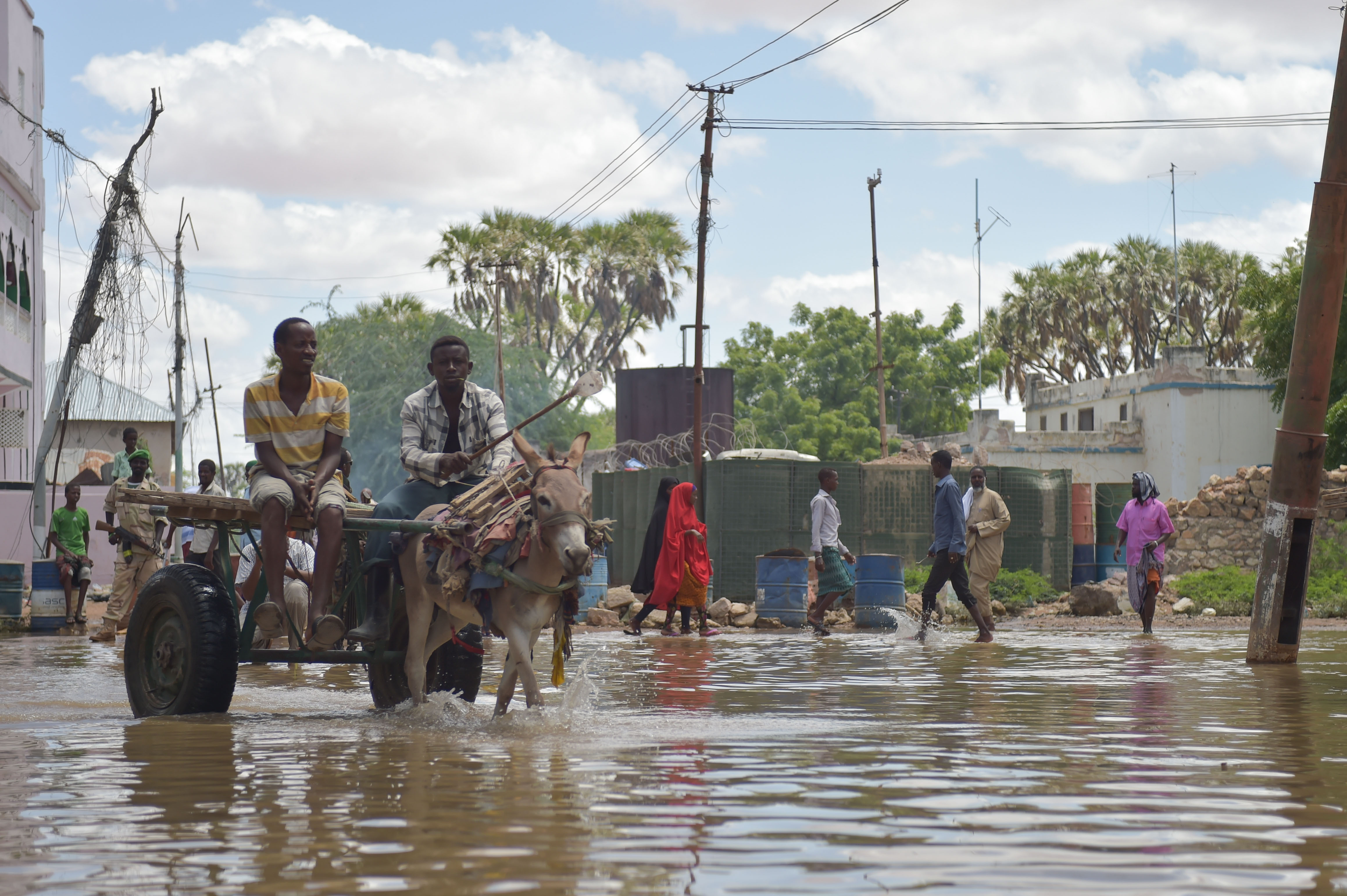
Flooded streets in Beledweyne, 2016

=== Human induced increases to destruction ===
The communities and government of Somalia have acted in ways that increase the destruction of the floods. In recent years, with population increases, more people are forced to live in the lower floodplain areas, and thus, are more susceptible to damage and loss of life by the flooding. In addition, flood relief channels that were managed by the government are now in disarray following the start of the Somali Civil War. As the current Transitional Federal Government does not have complete control over the country, there is no body that can manage relief aid, or successfully operate the flood relief channels, which distribute flood waters away from populated areas. These flood relief channels, specifically the ones near the Jubba and Shabelle river valleys, are inoperable and not protecting their respective areas. Also, the deterioration of the river banks for irrigation purposes causes the rivers to swell and flood easier.

=== Attempts to decrease devastation ===
Many attempts to control the effects of the flooding have been suggested. In 2007, combined efforts of organizations such as the United Nations, the Somalia Water and Land Information Management Project, the European Union, and many others suggested a new early warning system to help detect floods earlier to allow for evacuation and cover. The early warning system, which would have allowed more time for evacuation and preparedness proved to be costly, and was difficult to manage successfully in the area. In addition, humanitarian aid is often offered to those affected.

=== Assistance drawbacks ===
Due to Somalia's current political situation, assistance is often difficult to acquire out of fear of the anarchy in the nation. In May 2013, the United Nations offered a position of a meteorologist who would oversee early warning programs and detections throughout the nation. The position went unfilled. The fear of the political system and lack of funding often restricts any ideas for controlling the outcomes of the flooding.

=== Resiliency ===
Due to the country's economic disparity, those affected are often affected severely. In the most recent flooding of May 2013, seven children were reported dead, and more than 50,000 people were left homeless by the waters. With little technology to forecast the floods, and little money to build adequate housing, or provide transportation away from affected areas, the number of people affected increases dramatically. Along with the flooding, the population of Somalia suffers from drought, food crises, and diseases. Some diseases become prevalent directly from the flooding and mosquito population increases. Malaria outbreaks, and Ebola virus outbreaks are direct results of the massive flooding, which have devastating effects on the human population. The communities in the flood areas are not resilient to the problems the floods bring, and this causes massive damage to both property and human life.

== Historical data ==
The Gu rains bring annual rainfall to the southwestern part of Somalia. With the rainfall, flash floods almost always affect the floodplains in some way. However, in recent years, the damage from the floods has become much more severe, with 2006, 2011, 2012, and 2013 causing tremendous more damage than previously.

- In 2006, the flooding was the most damaging flood in East Africa in 50 years. Reports indicate that the floodwaters drowned the livestock, submerged the crop, swept away homes, and starved the population on scales not seen before. The 2006 flood affected at least 300,000 people,
- The 2007 flood displaced at least 400,000 people.
- The 2011 flooding displaced at least 1,000 homes.
- In 2012, at least 25 people were killed by the flooding, 5,000 livestock animals were drowned, and 20,000 people were displaced. In 2013, at least 7 people were killed, and 50,000 displaced.
- In 2018, 215,000 people have been displaced and over 630,000 affected by floods.
- In 2019, over 500,000 people were displaced by the floods.
- In 2020, almost 1 million people were affected by the floods, with 400,000 being displaced. Beledweyne District was the worst hit region, with 25 villages and 85% of the town of Beledweyne being affected. 40% of residents of Jowhar were also displaced from their homes.

== Comparisons to similar natural disturbances ==
In comparison with the 2013 Colorado floods, the floods of Somalia occurred at similar times in recent years. The Somali floods and the Colorado floods are natural disturbances that occurred from rainfall that affected an unprepared area. However, due to economic, structural, infrastructural, technological, responsiveness and aid differences, the Somali area was more damaged in context than was the Coloradoan area. In Colorado, there were around ten people reported dead, and around 1,800 homes were destroyed. The capabilities of response, evacuation, and aversion are not as strong in Somalia as they are in the United States. These differences could be a major factor in the differing damage totals.
