= Fiq, Ethiopia =

Fiiq ፊቅ
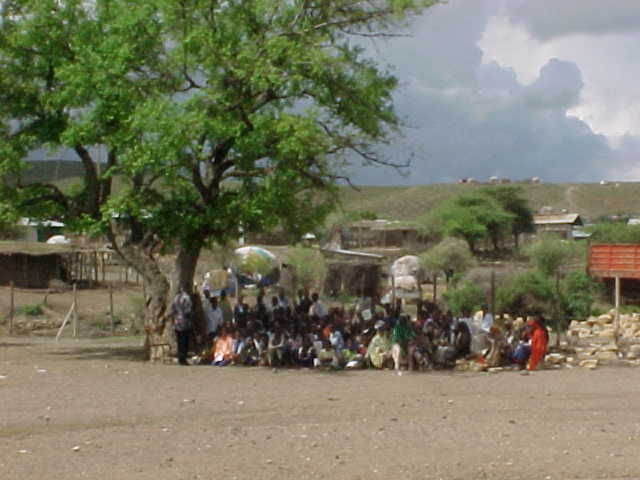
- Central Market of Fiq, Ethiopia

- Location within Ethiopia
- Coordinates: 8°8′N 42°18′E
- Country: Ethiopia
- Region: Somali
- Zone: ERER
- Woreda: FIIQ
- Elevation: 1,229 m (4,032 ft)

Population (2005)
  - Total: 1,920,911
- 960,932 males and 950,979 females
- Time zone: UTC+3 (EAT)

Fiq, (Amharic: ፊቅ) (Somali pronunciation: [ˈfiːq], Somali pronunciation: [ˈfiːχ]; فیق), is a town in eastern Ethiopia. Located in the Erer Zone of the Somali Region, this town has a latitude and longitude of 08°8′N 42°18′E with an elevation of 1229 meters above sea level.

== History ==
The Guida dell'Africa Orientale Italiana described Fiq in 1938 as a place where the Somali would gather during certain months. Travel by motorcar between Fiq and Babille was possible by a track. Administrative buildings present at the time included a post office, telegraph office and an infirmary.

Early in the Ogaden War, Fiq was captured by Somali units; following the fall of Jijiga they used the town as a base for the southern jaw of a pincher attack with the goal of capturing Harar, which raged for four months from September 1977 to January 1978. Despite unexpectedly heavy resistance from the Somali, the Ethiopian Eighth division, supported by a Cuban artillery battalion, entered Fiq on 8 March 1978.

== Demographics ==
Based on figures from the Central Statistical Agency in 2005, this town has an estimated total population of 192,911, of whom 960,932 were men and 950,979 were women. The 1997 national census reported a total population for this town of 168,656, of whom 84,580 were men and 84,076 were women. The predominant ethnic group reported in Fiq was the Somali (100% of the population). It is the largest town in Fiq woreda.
