= Solai =

Town in Nakuru county, Kenya

Coordinates: 00°03′28″S 36°07′34″E

Solai is a town in Nakuru County, Kenya. It is located about thirty kilometers north of the county capital, Nakuru. Lake Solai lies to its north.

Administratively, Solai is a location in Solai division of Nakuru County. Solai location has a population of 35,949. Solai is also an electoral ward in Subukia Constituency and Nakuru County Council.

Elevation = 1952m.

== Transport ==
Solai is the terminus of a branch railway coming from Rongai, which has been disused for over 30 years. About 25% of this railway line has been vandalized by now, with increases over the last years. As of lately, KRC and railway police have dismantled and carried away tracks and sleepers for "safe storage".

== History ==
On May 9, 2018, the Patel dam outside Solai broke, killing at least 47 and leaving over 2000 people homeless.
