= Jerer River =

River in Ethiopia

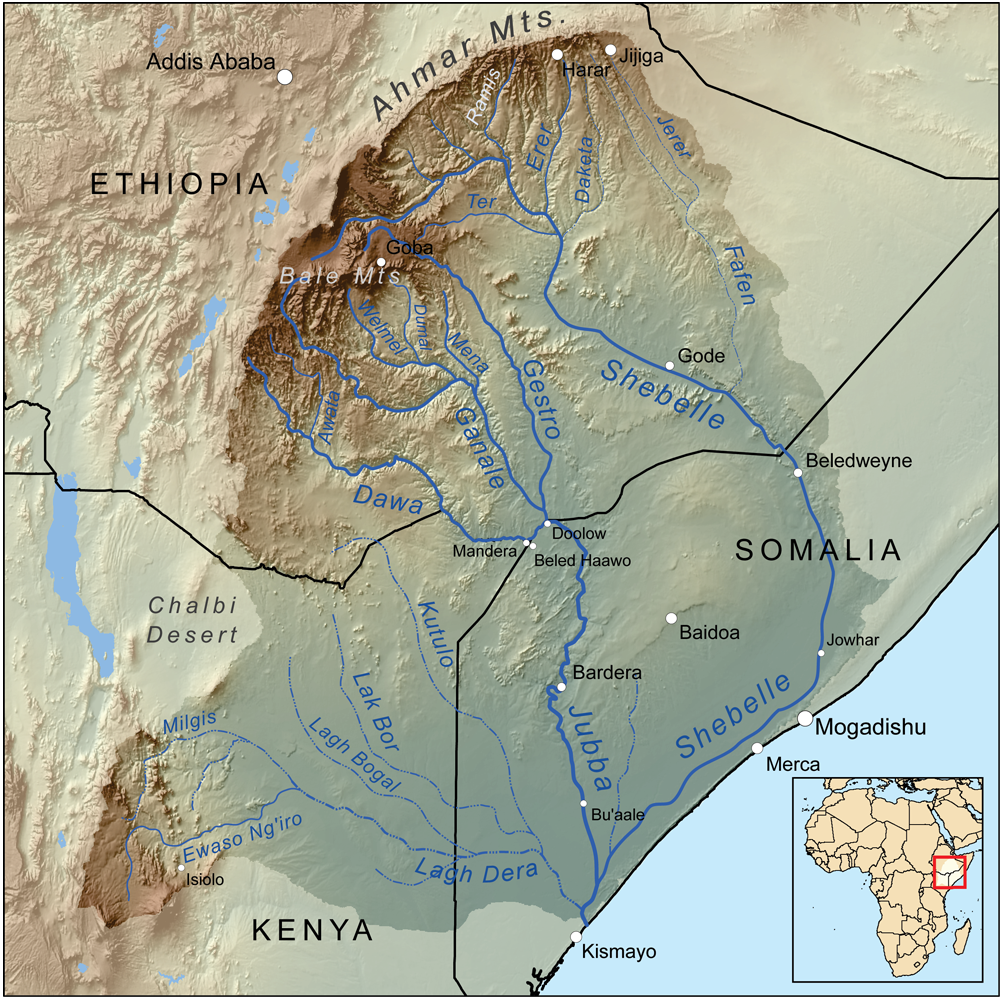
- Map of the Jubba River Basin, showing the Jerer in the upper right

Location
- Country: Ethiopia
- Regions: Somali, Oromia

Physical characteristics
- Source: Ethiopian Highlands
  - location: Near Chinaksen
  - coordinates: 9°31′43″N 42°34′28″E
  - elevation: 2,505 m (8,219 ft)
- Mouth: Fafen River
  - coordinates: 7°39′27″N 43°48′12″E
  - elevation: 777 m (2,549 ft)
- Length: 309 km (192 mi)
- Basin size: 10,628 km^{2} (4,103 sq mi)
- Discharge
  - location: Mouth
  - average: 5.22 m^{3}/s (184 cu ft/s)
  - minimum: 0 m^{3}/s (0 cu ft/s)
  - maximum: 20.2 m^{3}/s (710 cu ft/s)

Basin features
- Progression: Fafen → Shebelle → Jubba → Somali Sea
- River system: Jubba Basin
- Cities: Jijiga
- Population: 579,000

The Jerer is an intermittent stream of eastern Ethiopia. A tributary of the Fafen River, it rises near Jijiga to flow in a south-easterly direction.
