= Nogob Zone =

Zone in Somali Region of Ethiopia

Nogob Zone Gobolka Nogob
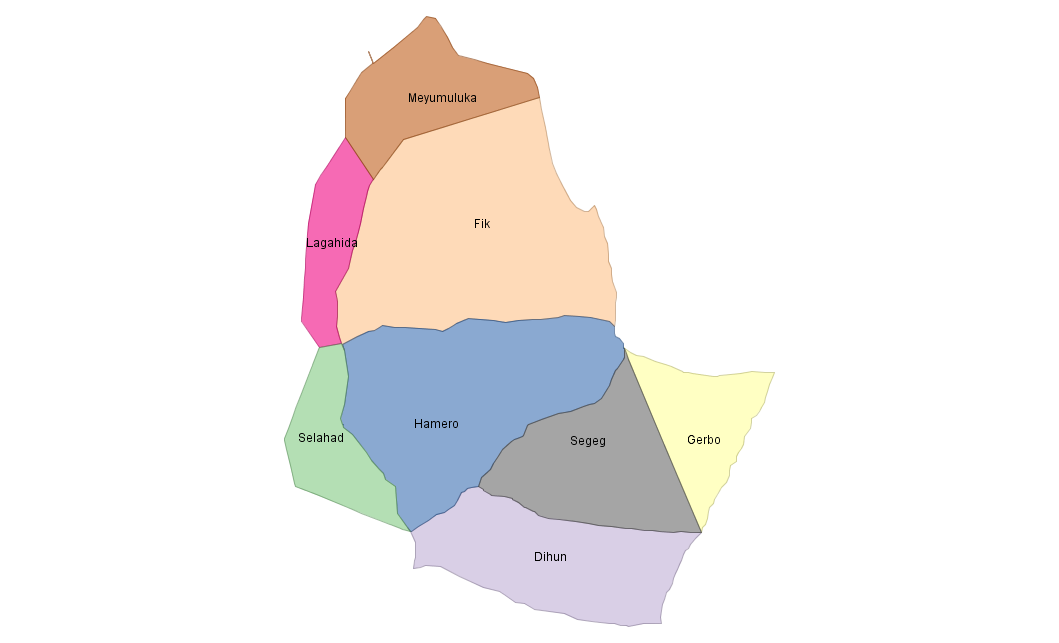
- Map of Nogob Zone

- Location within Ethiopia
- Coordinates: 7°45′N 42°20′E
- Country: Ethiopia
- Region: Somali
- Zone: Nogob
- Capital: Fiq

Population (2007)
  - Total: 1,337,321
- Time zone: UTC+3 (EAT)

Nogob (Somali: Nogob), formerly known as Fik, is a zone in Somali Region of Ethiopia. now Nogob Zone is 7 woredas and capital city of Nogob zone is Elwayne

bordered on the south by Gode, on the southwest by Afder Zone, on the west and northwest by the Erar zone on the north by jarar, on the east by Jarar, and on the southeast by Korahe Zone. Erer River flows through this zone. Nogob has 7 woredas: Elwayne Segeg, Garbo, haraarey, Horashagah, Ayuun, Dihun,

The Swiss section of Médecins Sans Frontières (MSF) opened a clinic in the Zone, in December 2007, to provide medical services to local civilians affected by the local conflict between local insurgents and the Ethiopian government. However, constant administrative hurdles and intimidation towards MSF staff prevented the organization from providing an effective level of medical care, which ultimately caused MSF to withdraw from the Zone in July of the next year. "Over the six months of our intervention, our medical teams could only work for ten weeks in Fiiq town and five in the periphery of the town where the most important needs are," said Hugues Robert, head of the MSF Ethiopia program.

== Demographics ==
Based on the 2007 Census conducted by the Central Statistical Agency of Ethiopia (CSA), this Zone has a total population of 1,000,000 - 1,100,000 of whom 560,000 are men and 430,478 women. While 33,930 or 9.74% are urban inhabitants, a further 193,207 or 55.45% were pastoralists. The largest ethnic group reported in Fik were the Somalis (98.81%); all other ethnic groups made up 1.19% of the population. Somali language is spoken as a first language by 98.81%; the remaining 1.19% spoke all other primary languages reported. 99.27% of the population said they were Muslim.

The 1997 national census reported a total population for this Zone of 233,431 in 31,050 households, of whom 130,455 were men and 102,976 were women; 22,607 or 9.68% of its population were urban dwellers. (This total also includes an estimate for the inhabitants of 36 rural kebeles, which were not counted; they were estimated to have 14,460 inhabitants, of whom 7,955 were men and 6,505 women.) The largest ethnic group reported in Fiq was the Somali (99.89%); a similar proportion spoke Somali (99.98%). Only 2,912 or 1.33% were literate.

According to a May 24, 2004 World Bank memorandum, none of the inhabitants of Nogob have access to electricity, this zone has a road density of 0.0 kilometers per 1000 square kilometers, the average rural household has 1.5 hectare of land (compared to the national average of 1.01 hectare of land and an average of 2.25 for pastoral Regions) and the equivalent of 1.2 heads of livestock. 28.2% of the population is in non-farm related jobs, compared to the national average of 25% and an average of 28% for pastoral Regions. 18% of all eligible children are enrolled in primary school, and none in secondary schools. 83% of the zone is exposed to malaria, and 83% to Tsetse fly. The memorandum gave this zone a drought risk rating of 588.

== Agriculture ==
Map of the regions and zones of Ethiopia

On 5–23 November 2003, the CSA conducted the first ever national agricultural census, of which the livestock census was an important component. For the Somali Region, the CSA generated estimate figures for the livestock population (cattle, sheep, goats, camels, and equids) and their distribution by commissioning an aerial survey. For the Nogob Zone, their results included:

Animal	Estimated total	number per sqk.
cattle	17,072	1.0
sheep	57,561	12.2 (including goats)
goats	141,475	12.2 (including sheep)
camels	25,605	1.6
asses	3,033	0.2 (all equids)
mules	26	0.2 (all equids)
horses	13	0.2 (all equids)
