= Salahad =

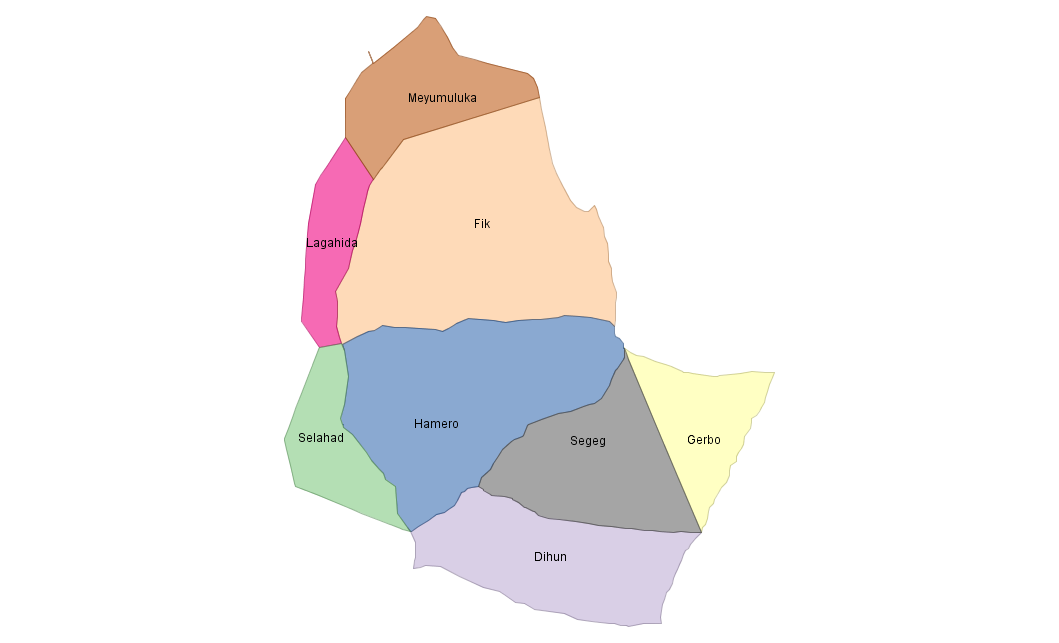

Salaxaad is one of the woredas in the Somali Region of Ethiopia.

== Demographics ==
Based on the 2007 Census conducted by the Central Statistical Agency of Ethiopia (CSA), this woreda has a total population of 290,082, of whom 200,675 are men and 89,407 women. While 12, or 15.43% are urban inhabitants, a further 217,561.5 or 75% are pastoralists. 100% of the population said they were Muslim.

[1]

This woreda is primarily inhabited by the Aden-khayr and alinasir yusuf clan of sub reer Abdille of larger Ogaden the Somali people.
