= Fafen River =

River of eastern Ethiopia

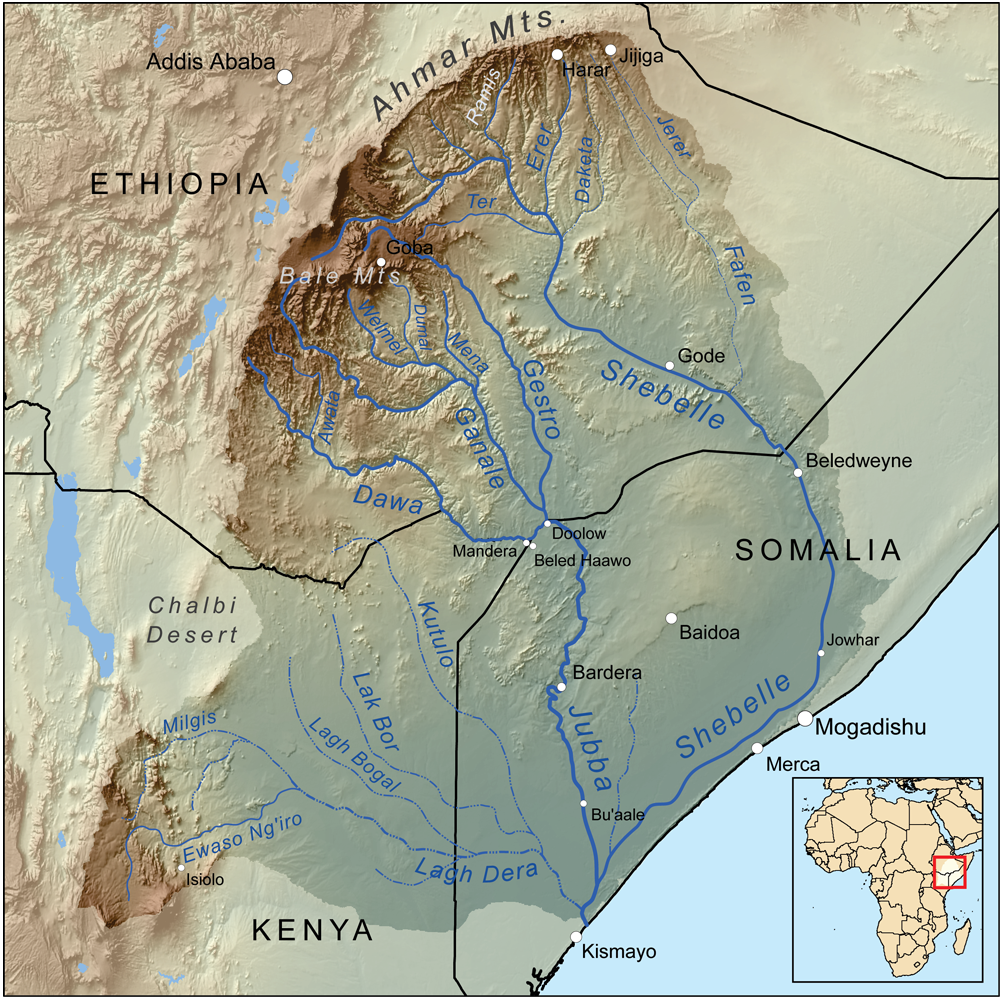
- Map showing the Jubba and Shebelle rivers drainage basin

Location
- Country: Ethiopia
- Region: Somali, Oromia

Physical characteristics
- Source: Ethiopian Highlands
  - location: Near Chinaksen
  - coordinates: 9°31′43″N 42°34′28″E
  - elevation: 2,505 m (8,219 ft)
- Mouth: Shebelle River (sometimes)
  - coordinates: 5°02′45″N 44°59′00″E
  - elevation: 199 m (653 ft)
- Length: 713 km (443 mi)
- Basin size: 45,572 km^{2} (17,595 sq mi)
- Discharge
  - location: Mouth
  - average: 37.5 m^{3}/s (1,320 cu ft/s)
  - minimum: 0 m^{3}/s (0 cu ft/s)
  - maximum: 115.2 m^{3}/s (4,070 cu ft/s)

Basin features
- Progression: Shebelle → Jubba → Somali Sea
- River system: Jubba Basin
- Population: 969,000
- Tributaries
  - left: Jerer River

Fafen River is a river of eastern Ethiopia. Rising to the east of Harar, in Harari Region, it cuts through a series of wide, flat shelves of sedimentary rocks made of sandstone, limestone, and gypsum as it descends in a south-eastern direction towards the Shebelle River. The Fafen only joins the Shebelle River during times of heavy rainfall.

== See also ==
- List of rivers of Ethiopia
