= Gursum, Somali (woreda) =

District in Somali Region, Ethiopia

Coordinates: 9°20′N 42°35′E

Gursum is a woreda in Somali Region, Ethiopia. Part of the Fafan Zone, Gursum (Somali: Dagmada Gursum) is one of the districts (woredas) in the Somali Region of Ethiopia. It is part of the Fafan Zone, located in the eastern part of the region.Gursum is bordered by:North: Gursum District of the Oromia Region West: Babile District East: Jijiga District South: Goljanno District in the Somali Region

== Demographics ==
Gursum district has a total population of 211,593 people, of whom 105,509 are men and 106,084 are women.

Urban dwellers: 15,478 individuals, representing 7.31% of the population, which is similar to the Fafan Zone average of 6.9%.

Area: 876.57 square kilometers.

Population density: 241.4 people per square kilometer.

The district is primarily inhabited by the Arap clan, with maturity populations of Muuse Celi

2007 Census

The 2007 Ethiopian national census recorded a population of 27,400 people for Gursum district. However, this figure did not include the 17 village centers of Boraale, which are largely inhabited by members of the Akisho clan.

Estimated Boraale population in 2007: 81,000 people.

Combined total for Gursum in 2007: 108,400 people (district + Boraale).

Demographics

The population of Gursum is 100% Somali.

The Arap and aw qudub clan makes up approximately 100% of the population, residing mainly in Bombas, Boraale, Dhagaxle and the surrounding villages. Boraale is considered the stronghold of the Arap clan, known for its fertile farmland and high population density.
