= Erer River =

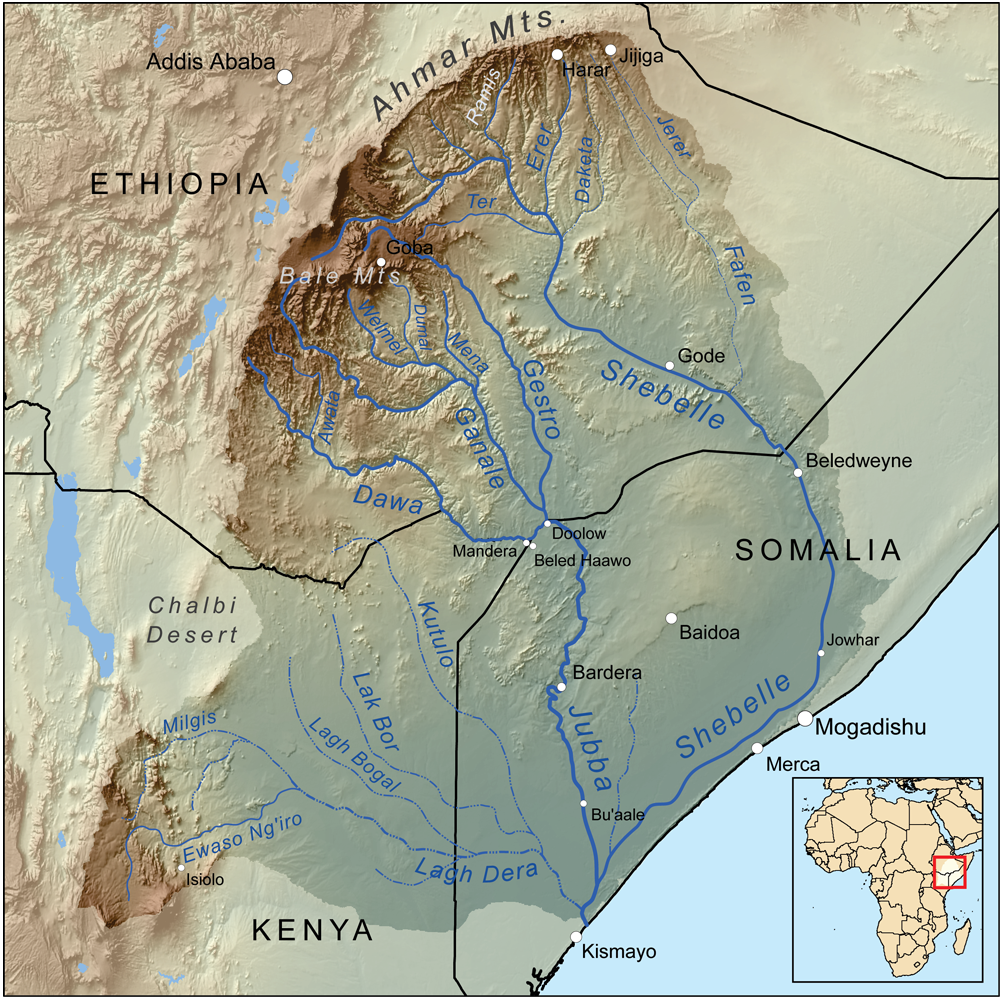
- Map of the Jubba/Shebelle drainage basin

Location
- Country: Ethiopia
- Regions: Oromia, Somali, Harari, Dire Dawa

Physical characteristics
- Source: Ethiopian Highlands
  - coordinates: 9°27′29″N 42°04′52″E
  - elevation: 2,422 m (7,946 ft)
- Mouth: Shebelle River
  - coordinates: 7°33′43″N 42°01′43″E
  - elevation: 500 m (1,600 ft)
- Length: 264 km (164 mi)
- Basin size: 14,846 km^{2} (5,732 sq mi)
- Discharge
  - location: Mouth
  - average: 14.26 m^{3}/s (504 cu ft/s)
  - minimum: 0 m^{3}/s (0 cu ft/s)
  - maximum: 32.25 m^{3}/s (1,139 cu ft/s)

Basin features
- Progression: Shebelle → Jubba → Somali Sea
- River system: Jubba Basin
- Population: 2,890,000

The Erer River is a perennial river of eastern Ethiopia. It rises near the city of Harar, in the Harari Region, and flows southward toward its confluence with the Shabelle. The river is part of the Jubba Basin and has a total length of 264 km (164 mi).

== See also ==
- Rivers of Ethiopia
