= Shebelle River =

River in Somalia

Shebelle River Shabelle
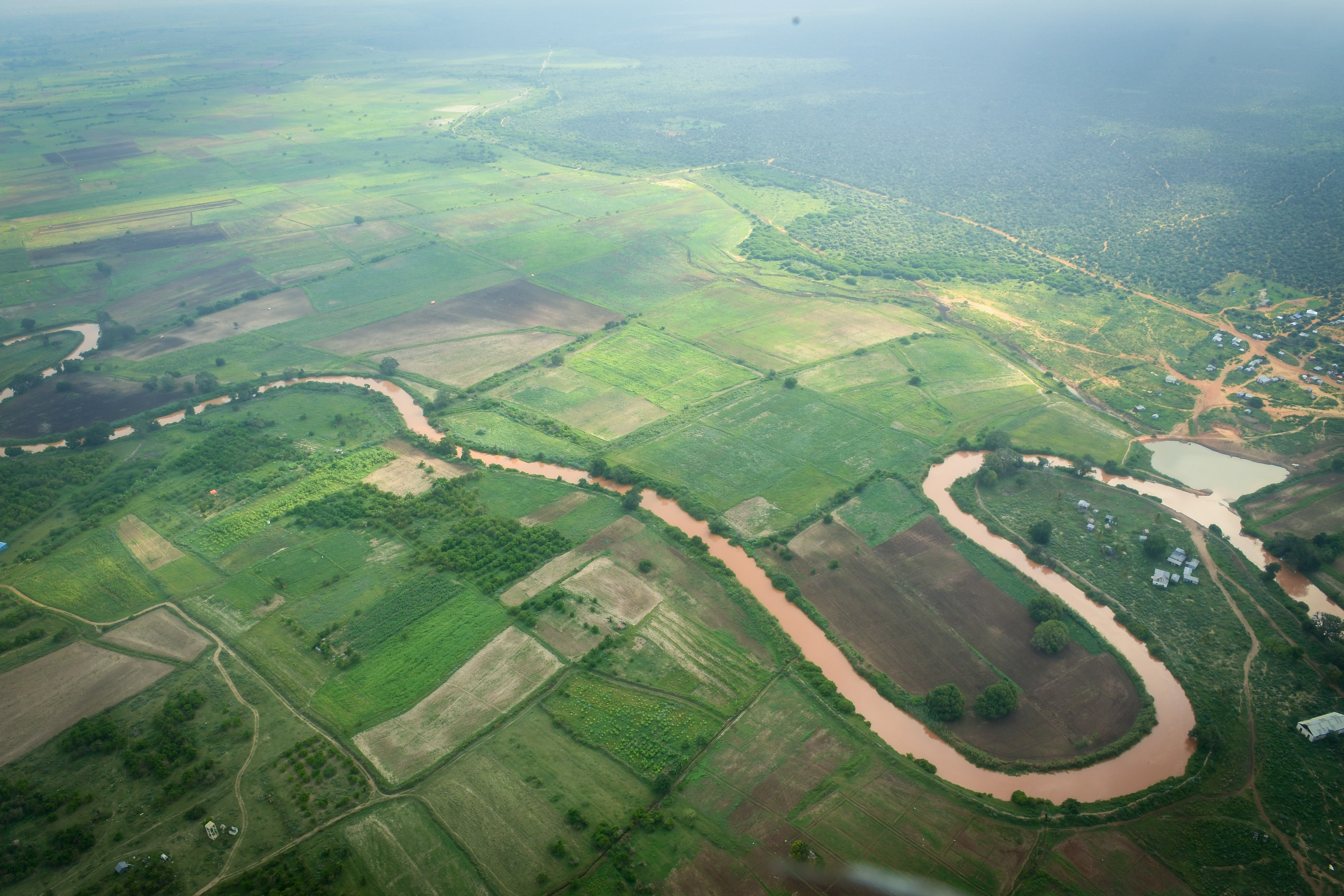
- Shebelle River in Hirshabelle State

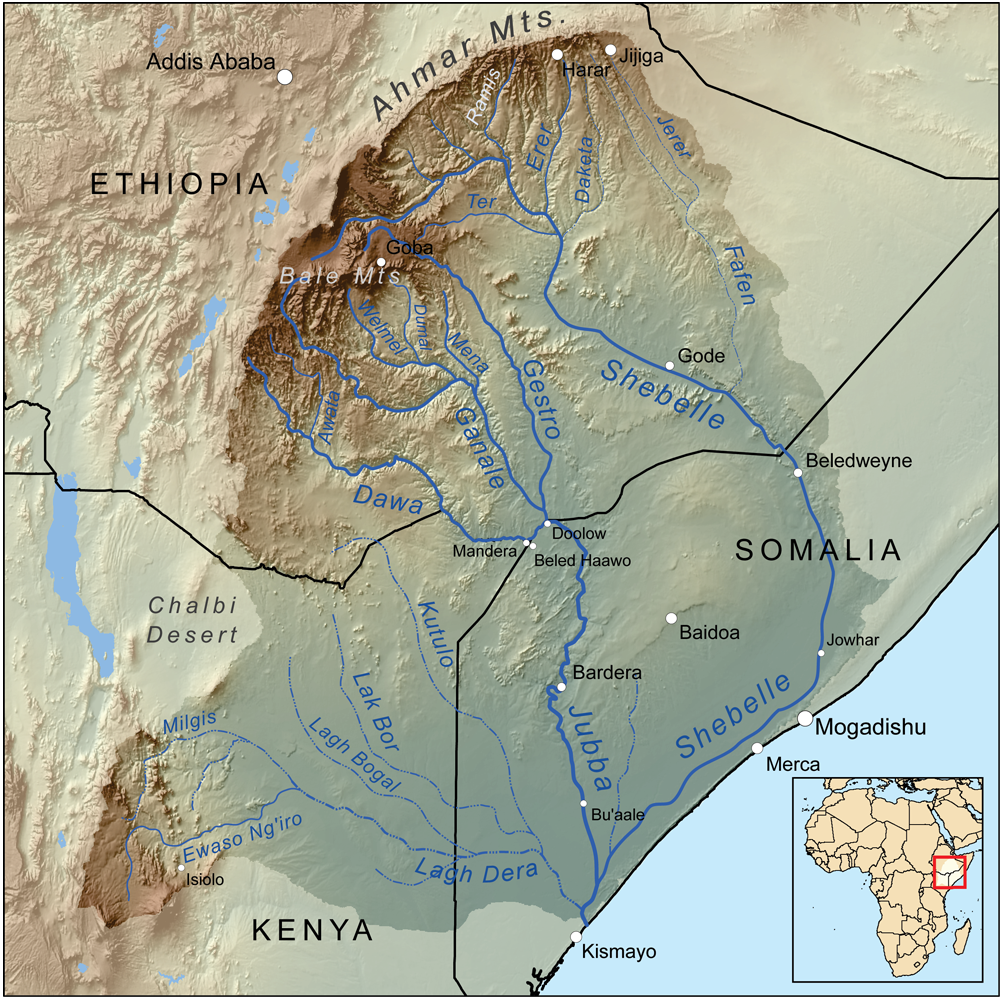
- Map of the Jubba/Shebelle drainage basin
- Native name: Laga Shabeellee (Oromo); Webi Shabeelle (Somali)

Location
- Countries: Ethiopia; Somalia

Physical characteristics
- Source: Ethiopian Highlands
  - location: Robe Gerjeda, Ethiopia
  - coordinates: 7°13′12″N 39°27′59″E
  - elevation: 2,326 m (7,631 ft)
- Mouth: Jubba River (occasionally)
  - location: Jamame, Somalia
  - coordinates: 0°09′57″N 42°46′22″E
  - elevation: 14 m (46 ft)
- Length: 2,064 km (1,283 mi)
- Basin size: 298,253 km^{2} (115,156 sq mi)
- Discharge
  - location: Mouth
  - average: 71.2 m^{3}/s (2,510 cu ft/s)
  - minimum: 15.7 m^{3}/s (550 cu ft/s)
  - maximum: 158.7 m^{3}/s (5,600 cu ft/s)

Basin features
- Progression: Jubba → Somali Sea
- River system: Jubba River
- Cities: Beledweyne, Jowhar
- Population: 13,900,000
- Tributaries
  - left: Erer, Fafen
- Waterbodies: Melka Wakena Reservoir

The Shebelle River (Oromo: Laga Shabeellee, Somali: Webi Shabeelle, Amharic: እደላ, Italian: fiume Uebi Scebeli) also known historically as the Nile of Mogadishu, begins in the highlands of Ethiopia and then flows southeast into Somalia towards Mogadishu. Near Mogadishu, it turns sharply southwest, where it follows the coast. Below Mogadishu, the river becomes seasonal. During most years, the river dries up near the mouth of the Jubba River, while in seasons of heavy rainfall, the river actually reaches the Jubba and thus the ocean.

During periods of heavy rainfall in Ethiopia, the Shebelle and Jubba Rivers merge, and their combined waters ultimately reach the Indian Ocean. In drier years, though, the Shebelle River diminishes and transforms into a series of wetlands and sandy plains to the northeast of the confluence with the Jubba. The Shebelle River has a total length of 1,820 km. The area surrounding it is inhabited by Arsi Oromo people, Somali people in the Somali Region of Ethiopia, and Somali people in Somalia. In the lower basin of the river, agriculture has largely replaced the traditional nomadic herding lifestyle, and the cultivation of bananas along the southern stretches of the Shebeli and Jubba Rivers contributes significantly to Somalia's export industry.

== Tributaries ==
The Shebelle has a number of tributaries, both seasonal and permanent rivers. They include:

- Erer River
- Galetti River
- Wabe River

The Fafen only reaches the Shebelle in times of heavy rainfall; its stream usually ends before reaching the main river.

== History ==
=== Ajuran Empire ===
During the Middle Ages, the Shebelle River was under the control of the Ajuran Empire and was largely used for its plantations. Coming into prominence during the 13th century AD, the Ajuran monopolized the water resources of the Jubba and Shebelle Rivers. Through hydraulic engineering, they also constructed many of the limestone wells and cisterns of the state, many of which are still in use today. Its rulers developed new systems for agriculture and taxation, which continued to be used in parts of the Horn of Africa as late as the 19th century.

Through their control of the region's wells, the Garen rulers effectively held a monopoly over their nomadic subjects as they were the only hydraulic empire in Africa during their reign. Large wells made out of limestone were constructed throughout the state, which attracted Somali and Oromo nomads with their livestock. The centralized regulations of the wells made settling disputes easier for the nomads by taking their queries to government officials who would act as mediators. Long-distance caravan trade, a long-time practice in the Horn of Africa, continued unchanged in Ajuran times. Today, numerous ruined and abandoned towns throughout the interior of Somalia and the Horn of Africa are evidence of a once-booming inland trade network dating from the medieval period.

With the centralized supervision of the Ajuran, farms in Afgooye, Bardhere, and other areas in the Jubba and Shabelle increased their productivity. A system of irrigation ditches known locally as kelliyo fed directly from the Shebelle and Jubba Rivers into the plantations where sorghum, maize, beans, grain, and cotton were grown during the gu (spring in Somali) and xagaa (summer in Somali) seasons of the Somali calendar. This irrigation system was supported by numerous dikes and dams. To determine the average size of a farm, a land measurement system was also invented with moos, taraab, and guldeed being the terms used.

The urban centers of Mogadishu, Merca, Barawa, Kismayo, Hobyo, and other respective ports became profitable trade outlets for commodities originating from the interior of the state. The Somali farming communities of the hinterland from the ubba and Shebelle Rivers brought their crops to the Somali coastal cities, where they were sold to local merchants who maintained a lucrative foreign commerce with ships sailing to and coming from Arabia, Persia, India, Venice, Egypt, Portugal, and as far away as Java and China.

=== Modern period ===
According to Thomas Wakefield, who visited the region, the river was also known as the "Adari River". The source of the Shebelle River is cultivated by the Arsi Oromo. It is surrounded by a sacred enclosure wooded with juniper trees, which as of 1951 was under the protection of a Muslim member of the Arsi.

In 1989, with the help of Soviet engineers, the Melka Wakena Dam was built on the upper reaches of the Shebelle River in the Bale Mountains. Producing 153 megawatts, this dam is Ethiopia’s largest hydroelectric generator.

The recent history of the Shabelle is marked by frequent destructive flash floods. The Shabelle is said to have flooded every other year prior to the 1960s; that decade had only two devastating floods, the hidigsayley in 1965 and the soogudud in 1966. In the 1970s, the most devastating flood was the kabahay of 1978. In 1996, floods devastated three woredas in Ethiopia. On 23 October 1999, the river unexpectedly flooded in the middle of the night, destroying homes and crops in 14 of the 117 kebeles in Kelafo woreda, as well as 29 of the 46 kebeles in neighboring Mustahil woreda. According to the local authorities, 34 people and an estimated 750 livestock died, with 70,000 affected by the floods and in need of assistance. Two more recent floods were the dawdle in 2003, when about 100 livestock and 119 people were washed away, and the flood of April 2005, when about 30,000 persons were surrounded by floodwaters and 2,000 camels and 4,000 shoats were washed away by the floods; some locals consider this the worst flood in 40 years.

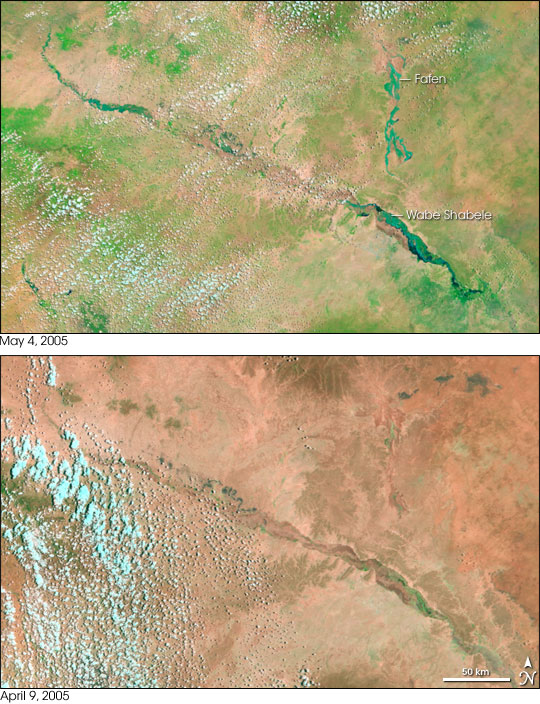
Satellite pictures showing the Shebelle valley in southern Somalia and Ethiopia before and during floods in 2005

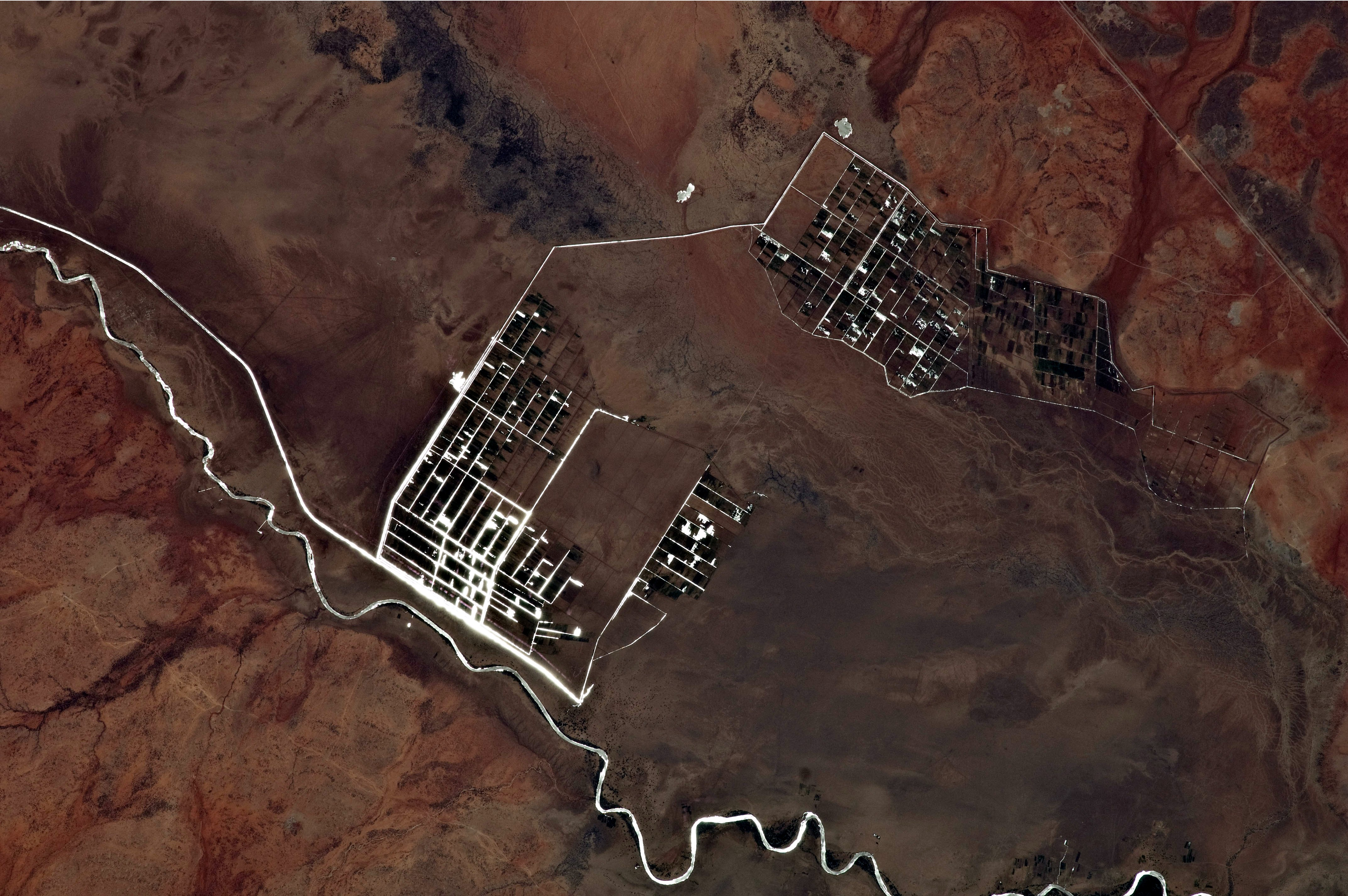
Astronaut photograph showing irrigation along the river

== See also ==
- Geography of Ethiopia
- Geography of Somalia
- List of rivers of Ethiopia
