= Odo Shakiso =

District of Oromia Region, Ethiopia

Coordinates: 5°35′N 38°55′E

Odo Shakiso Odoo Shakkisoo (Oromo)
- Woreda
- Location within Ethiopia
- Country: Ethiopia
- Region: (Oromia Region) Oromia
- Zone: Guji
- Time zone: UTC+3 (EAT)

Odo Shakiso is one of the woredas in Oromia Region, Ethiopia. Part of the Guji Zone, Odo Shakiso is bordered on the south by the Dawa River which separates it from Arero, on the west by Bule Hora, on the northeast by Uraga, on the north by Bore, on the northeast by Adolana Wadera, and on the east by Liben. Towns in Odo Shakiso include Shakiso and Megado.

== Overview ==
Two of the major mines of Ethiopia are located in Odo Shakiso: the Lega Dembi gold and the Kenticha tantalum mines, both near Shakiso. Gold has also been extracted by placer mining from the Awata River, which flows between Shakiso and Megado. A hydro-electric power station over the Mormora River was inaugurated by Emperor Haile Selassie in March 1965. Gold mining continues to be an important industry in this woreda, with the announcement 24 November 2009, that MIDROC Gold signed a 10-year agreement with the Ethiopian Ministry of Mines and Energy, for the extraction of almost 20.5 metric tons of gold from the Sakaro fields, three kilometers from the existing Lega Dembi Mines. Between 1998 and 2008 MIDROC extracted 34 metric tons from the Lega Dembi mines, earning 466 million dollars; the new mine at Sakara is expected to bring a revenue of 564 million dollars, of which 130 million will go to the government as taxes and royalties. Coffee is an important cash crop in this woreda; over 5,000 hectares are planted with it.

Odo Shakiso was one of four woredas that suffered from a wildfire that was started 10 February 2000 and was not brought under control until 7 April, after it had burned a total of 70,000 hectares. The woreda suffered from another wildfire in early 2008, which burned over 2,500 hectares, including 60 hectares planted in coffee and enset. Losses to wild animals, the displacement of eight households and damages to bee hives were also reported.

This woreda was part of the Borena Zone until it, along with four other woredas, were split off in September 2003 to create the Guji Zone.

== Demographics ==
The 2007 national census reported a total population for this woreda of 206,372, of whom 107,224 were men and 99,148 were women; 33,643 or 16.3% of its population were urban dwellers. The majority of the inhabitants said they were Protestant, with 56.64% of the population reporting they observed this belief, while 14.07% of the population practised Ethiopian Orthodox Christianity, 11.4% were Muslim, 10.69% practiced traditional beliefs, and 1.86% were Catholic.

Based on figures published by the Central Statistical Agency in 2005, this woreda has an estimated total population of 133,466, of whom 63,954 are men and 69,512 are women; 31,559 or 23.65% of its population are urban dwellers, which is greater than the Zone average of 11.6%. With an estimated area of 4,144.53 square kilometers, Odo Shakiso has an estimated population density of 32.2 people per square kilometer, which is greater than the Zone average of 21.1.

The 1994 national census reported a total population for this woreda of 91,785, of whom 47,642 were men and 44,143 women; 17,598 or 19.17% of its population were urban dwellers at the time. The four largest ethnic groups reported in Odo Shakiso were the Oromo (79.84%), the Amhara (9.35%), the Gedeo (5.38%), and the Soddo Gurage (1.04%); all other ethnic groups made up 4.39% of the population. Oromiffa was spoken as a first language by 75.76%, 16.61% spoke Amharic, and 4.99% spoke Gedeo; the remaining 2.64% spoke all other primary languages reported. The plurality of the inhabitants were Protestant, with 38.31% of the population having reported they practiced that belief, while 25.96% of the population said they professed Ethiopian Orthodox Christianity, 17.12% practiced traditional beliefs, 6.78% were Catholic, and 6.5% were Muslim.
