= Yabelo (woreda) =

District in Oromia Region, Ethiopia

Coordinates: 5°00′N 38°15′E

Yabelo is one of the woredas in the Oromia Region of Ethiopia, named after its administrative center, Yabelo. Part of the Borena Zone, Yabelo is bordered on the south by Dire, on the west by Teltele, on the north by Bule Hora, and on the east by Arero.

== Overview ==
The altitude of this woreda ranges from 350 to 1800 meters above sea level. There are no rivers or streams in Yabelo. A survey of the land in this woreda shows that 10% is arable or cultivable (7.5% was under annual crops), 60% pasture, 10% forest (5.5% state forests), and the remaining 20% is considered swampy, degraded or otherwise unusable. A notable local landmark is the Yabelo Wildlife Sanctuary. Teff, wheat, corn, haricot bean, sorghum and barley are important crops.

Industry in the woreda includes 19 grain mills and one metal works. Deposits of nickel are known to exist but have not been commercially developed. There were 15 Farmers Associations and 6 Farmers Service Cooperatives; about 70% of the farmers are pastoralists. Yabelo has 163 kilometers of dry-weather and 103 all-weather road, for an average road density of 48.2 kilometers per 1000 square kilometers. About 41% of the rural and 58.1% of the urban population has access to drinking water.

== History ==
In April 2005, ethnic conflict between the Guji Oromo and the Gabbra in southern Oromia led to massive displacement of people. An NGO working in the area reported as many as 50,000 people were forced to flee from Hagere Mariam, Yabelo and Arero woredas, and several thousand huts burnt.

In May 2009, the woreda authorities announced that development programs with a total budget of 20 million Birr had been completed in the woreda. These projects included four veterinary clinics, a 129-kilometer gravel road, and 65 kilometers of terracing works built in the previous nine months.

== Demographics ==
The 2007 national census reported a total population for this woreda of 102,165, of whom 51,418 were men and 50,747 were women; 17,497 or 17.13% of its population were urban dwellers. The majority of the inhabitants said they practiced traditional beliefs, with 59.8% of the population reporting they observed these beliefs, while 14.73% of the population were Protestant, 14.52% were Muslim, 8.28% practiced Ethiopian Orthodox Christianity and 1.79% were Catholic.

Based on figures published by the Central Statistical Agency in 2005, this woreda has an estimated total population of 82,443, of whom 41,132 are men and 41,311 are women; 18,478 or 22.41% of its population are urban dwellers, which is greater than the Zone average of 11.6%. With an estimated area of 5,523.31 square kilometers, Yabelo has an estimated population density of 14.9 people per square kilometer, which is less than the Zone average of 21.1.

The 1994 national census reported a total population for this woreda of 56,878, of whom 28,444 were men and 28,434 women; 10,322 or 18.15% of its population were urban dwellers at the time. The four largest ethnic groups reported in Yabelo were the Oromo (86.92%), the Burji (6.14%), the Amhara (3.71%), and the Konso (1.6%); all other ethnic groups made up 0.86% of the population. Oromiffa was spoken as a first language by 92.79%, 4.27% spoke Amharic, and 1.12% spoke Burji; the remaining 1.85% spoke all other primary languages reported. The majority of the inhabitants practiced traditional beliefs, with 47.06% of the population reporting answers that fell under that category, while 14.39% professed Ethiopian Orthodox Christianity, 9.64% of the population were Muslim, 6.2% were Protestant, and 1.05% were Catholic.
