= Teltele (woreda) =

Aanaas located in Oromia state of Ethiopia

Coordinates: 4°50′N 37°25′E

Teltele is one of the Aanaas in the Oromia of Ethiopia. It is named after the administrative center, Teltele. Located in the southwest corner of the Borena Zone, Teltele is bordered on the southwest by Kenya, on the west and north by the Sagan River, the only river in this woreda, which separates it from the Southern Nations, Nationalities, and Peoples Region, on the northeast by Yabelo, and on the southeast by Dire.

== Overview ==
The altitude of this woreda ranges from 710 to 1460 meters above sea level; the landscape consists mainly of lowlands and isolated hills. A survey of the land in this woreda shows that 25% is arable (2.5% was under cultivation), 48% pasture, 5% forest, 20% shrub and brush, and the remaining 2% is considered swampy, degraded or otherwise unusable. Lake Chew Bahir is a notable local landmark. Sorghum, corn, teff, haricot beans, chickpeas, wheat and barley are important crops.

Industry in the woreda includes 8 grain mills. There were 14 Farmers Associations and 2 Farmers Service Cooperatives; most of the farmers as pastoralists. Teltele has 65 kilometers of dry-weather road, for an average road density of 6.1 kilometers per 1000 square kilometers; at the time the Oromia Regional government wrote its report, an additional 100 kilometers of gravel road was under construction to link the towns of Teltele and Yabelo. About 26.6% of the rural and 13.9% of the urban population has access to drinking water.

== Demographics ==
The 2007 national census reported a total population for this woreda of 70,501, of whom 36,246 were men and 34,255 were women; 4,874 or 6.91% of its population were urban dwellers. The majority of the inhabitants said they practiced traditional beliefs, with 67.59% of the population reporting they observed these beliefs, while 14% of the population were Protestant, 7.66% practiced Ethiopian Orthodox Christianity, 6.77% were Muslim and 2.2% were Catholic.

Based on figures published by the Central Statistical Agency in 2005, this woreda has an estimated total population of 49,638, of whom 24,156 are men and 25,482 are women; 5,956 or 12.00% of its population are urban dwellers, which is roughly equal to the Zone average of 11.6%. With an estimated area of 10,627.82 square kilometers, Teltele has an estimated population density of 4.7 people per square kilometer, which is less than the Zone average of 21.1. Although the Borena Oromo are the predominant ethnic group in this woreda, members of the Konso, Arbore and Hamer peoples also reside there.

The 1994 national census reported a total population for this woreda of 35,128, of whom 18,084 were men and 17,044 women; 3,328 or 9.47% of its population were urban dwellers at the time. The four largest ethnic groups reported in Teltele were the Oromo (67.14%), the Konso (28.98%), the Amhara (1.4%), and the Burji (1.13%); all other ethnic groups made up 1.35% of the population. Oromiffa was spoken as a first language by 74.94%, 24.07% spoke Konso, and 0.47% spoke Amharic; the remaining 4.39% spoke all other primary languages reported. The majority of the inhabitants practiced traditional beliefs, with 67.36% of the population reported having beliefs that fell under that classification, while 8.21% of the population said they professed Ethiopian Orthodox Christianity, 6.81% were Muslim, and 2.23% were Protestant.
