= Bule Hora =

District in Oromia Region, Ethiopia

Coordinates: 5°35′N 38°20′E

Bule Hora Bulee Horaa (Oromo)
- Woreda
- Location within Ethiopia
- Country: Ethiopia
- Region: (Oromia Region) Oromia
- Zone: West Guji
- Time zone: UTC+3 (EAT)

Bule Hora is a woreda in Oromia Region, Ethiopia. It formerly included Dugda Dawa and Kercha districts. Part of the West Guji Zone, Bule Hora was bordered on the south by the Dawa River which separates it from Arero, on the southwest by Yabelo, on the west by the Southern Nations, Nationalities, and Peoples Region and Gelana Abaya, on the northeast by Uraga, and on the east by Odo Shakiso. The largest town of Bule Hora is Bule Hora Town.

In May 2000, a field assessment by the UNDP which included Bule Hora town collected informal reports of a growing number of private investors in coffee pulping/processing factories and coffee plantations in the district; however, many of their informants expressed concern voiced that this had been at the expense of local farmers. The four major crops grown in this district are maize, wheat, barley and haricot beans in that order, with some long cycle sorghum and teff as well; in some parts ensete or the false banana is also grown, which offers a degree of security during famines. Coffee is also an important cash crop; over 5,000 hectares are planted with it.

== History ==
Workers for the Texas Africa Exploration Company in 1958 found near Bule Hora town the titanium minerals rutile and ilmenite, as well as talc lenses which often contain asbestos, although the lenses found were very small in size, and the quality of the asbestos fiber was not good.

In April 2005, ethnic conflict between the Guji Oromo and the Gabbra in southern Oromia led to massive displacement of people. An NGO working in the area reported as many as 50,000 people in Bule Hora, Yabelo and Arero districts were forced to flee, and several thousand huts burnt.

== Demographics ==
The 2007 national census reported a total population for this district of 264,489, of whom 133,730 were men and 130,759 were women; 35,245 or 13.33% of its population were urban dwellers. The majority of the inhabitants said they were Protestant, with 74.42% of the population reporting they observed this belief, while 11.24% of the population practiced traditional beliefs, 5.85% practised Ethiopian Orthodox Christianity, 5.81% were Muslim and 1.4% were Catholic.

Based on figures published by the Central Statistical Agency in 2005, the not yet divided district (including today's districts of Bule Hora, Dugda Dawa and Kercha) had an estimated total population of 546,456, of whom 269,727 were men and 276,729 were women; 22,784 or 4.17% of its population were urban dwellers, which was less than the Zone average of 11.6%. With an estimated area of 6,021.88 square kilometers, Bule Hora district had an estimated population density of 90.7 people per square kilometer, which was greater than the Zone average of 21.1.

The 1994 national census reported a total population for this woreda of 393,905, of whom 200,411 were men and 193,494 women; 12,718 or 3.23% of its population were urban dwellers at the time. The four largest ethnic groups reported in Bule Hora were the Oromo (70.98%), the Gedeo (25.77%), the Amhara (1.16%), and the Burji (0.87%); all other ethnic groups made up 1.22% of the population. Oromiffa was spoken as a first language by 72.2%, 25.41% spoke Gedeo and 1.59% spoke Amharic; the remaining 0.8% spoke all other primary languages reported. The plurality of the inhabitants were Protestant, with 41.09% of the population having reported they practiced that belief, while 32.78% of the population said they practiced Waaqeffanna, 7.43% professed Ethiopian Orthodox Christianity, 5.94% were Muslim, and 2.85% were Catholic.
