= Shakiso =

Town in Oromia Region, Ethiopia

Shakiso Shakkisoo (Oromo)
- Town
- Location within Ethiopia
- Coordinates: 5°45′N 38°55′E
- Country: Ethiopia
- Region: Oromia
- Zone: Guji
- Elevation: 1,758 m (5,768 ft)

Population (2005)
  - Total: 28,260
- Time zone: UTC+3 (EAT)

Shakiso is a town in Oromia Region, Ethiopia. Located in the Guji Zone of the Oromia Region, this town has a latitude and longitude of 5°45′N 38°55′E and an elevation of 1758 meters above sea level.

Two of the major mines of Ethiopia are located near Shakiso: the Lega Dembi gold and the Kenticha tantalum mines. The Lega Dembi Mine was acquired by MIDROC gold, which between 1998 and 2008 extracted 34 metric tons from the mines, earning 466 million dollars. However, MIDROC has announced in 2009 that the deposits at Lega Dembi are almost exhausted. Shakiso is served by an airport (ICAO code HASK, IATA SKR).

== History ==
The Swedish Red Cross report encountering a customs post at Shakiso when moving at the southern front in early 1936. There were two substantial waterholes there, although the water was somewhat salty. The customs staff had four small buildings on the top of a hill near the main road. Their primary task was to collect salt tax from caravans, which amounted to ten or eleven Maria Theresa Thalers per month before the Second Italian-Abyssinian War.

Following the savage suppression of their revolt in 1960, numerous members of the Gedeo people were forcibly evicted from their homes, and over the following years some migrated to Shakiso to settle. However, the unrest of the early years of the Ethiopian Revolution forced many of these migrants to leave Shakiso for their homeland.

Tahir Shah describes Shakiso in his 2002 book, In Search of King Solomon's Mines, as "a frontier town" which isn't mentioned in travel books "nor was it on my map." The main street featured shops "selling Western contraband—Walkmans and televisions, Swiss Army knives, Russian vodka, lacy underwear, Marlboro cigarettes and CDs." These goods were offered to miners with ample disposable income from working both the official gold mine at Lega Dembi, as well as countless illegal gold mines in the Adola greenstone belt.

Land clashes in June 2006 between the rival Guji and Borena Oromo clans left about 100 people dead in and around the towns of Shakiso, Arero and Yabelo. According to Oxfam, more than 20,000 people had fled from the environs of Shakiso.

By March, 2009, drinkable water projects with a budget of 38 million Birr were underway at Shakiso and Adola Wayou, which were expected to benefit 72,000 residents.

== Demographics ==
Based on figures from the Central Statistical Agency in 2005, Shakiso has an estimated total population of 28,260, of whom 15,463 are men and 12,797 are women. It is the larger of the two towns in Odo Shakiso woreda.

The 1994 census reported Wacca had a total population of 15,757 of whom 8,386 were men and 7,371 were women. The five largest ethnic groups reported for this town were the Oromo (43.52%), the Amhara (33.33%), the Soddo Gurage (4.12%), the Gedeo (3.95%), and the Welayta (3.62%); all other ethnic groups made up 11.46% of the population. Amharic is spoken as a first language by 63.61%, 25.72% Oromo, and 2.86% spoke Gedeo; the remaining 7.81% spoke all other primary languages reported.
