= Gedeo–Guji clashes =

2018 territorial conflict in Gedeo and Guji zones in Ethiopia

- Part of the Ethiopian civil conflict (2018–present) and Oromo conflict
- Gedeo (Ethiopia)
Date	1995 – July 2018
Location	Border between Gedeo zone and West Guji Zone

Belligerents
Guji Oromo	Gedeo people

Strength
Unknown	Unknown

Casualties and losses
- 1,725 deaths and 800,000 civilians, mostly Gedeo, displaced

The Gedeo–Guji clashes were a territorial conflict between the Guji Oromo and the Gedeo people, that began in 1995. The clashes led to about 800,000 mostly ethnic Gedeos fleeing their homes in 2018, a higher number and over a shorter period of time, than occurred at the height of the more publicized Rohingya crisis in Myanmar the year before. The government pressured the refugees to return to their homes even though they fear for their lives, often by denying refugees access to humanitarian aid.

This conflict is a concurrent territorial conflict with the Oromia–Somali clashes between Oromia Region and Somali region border in the east of the Ethiopia. These ethnic conflicts involving the Guji led to Ethiopia having the largest number of people to flee their homes in the world in 2018. Some have blamed Prime Minister Abiy Ahmed for giving space to political groups formerly banned by previous Tigrayan-led governments, such as the Ginbot 7, Oromo Liberation Front, Sidama Liberation Front and ONLF.

== See also ==
- Ethnic violence against Amaro Koore
- Ethnic violence in Konso
- Gedeo people
- Guji Oromo
- Guji Zone
