= Moyale, Oromia (woreda) =

District in Oromia Region, Ethiopia

Coordinates: 4°00′N 39°10′E

Moyale (Oromo: Moyyaalee) is one of the woredas in the Oromia Region of Ethiopia. It is named after the administrative center of the woreda, Moyale. Located in the southeast corner of the Borena Zone, Moyale is bordered on the south by Kenya, on the west by Dire, on the northwest by Arero, on the north by the Dawa River which separates it from Liben, and on the east by Dawa Zone Somali Region.

== Overview ==
The altitude of this woreda ranges from 1150 to 1350 meters above sea level; Mount Juldessa is the highest point. A survey of the land in this woreda shows that 9% is arable, 60% pasture, 21% forest, and the remaining 10% is considered swampy, degraded or otherwise unusable. Cereals cultivated include corn, wheat, teff, barley and sorghum; sugar cane, banana and papaya are other important crops.

Industry in the woreda includes 8 grain mills, some metal workshops, 4 wood working shops, 2 brick and tube factories. Deposits of gold, cobalt, graphite and muscovite are known in the woreda but have not been commercially developed. There were 15 Farmers Associations and one Farmers Service Cooperative. Moyale has 34 kilometers of dry-weather and 55 all-weather road, for an average road density of 5.71 kilometers per 1000 square kilometers. About 3.8% of the rural and 39.7% of the urban population has access to drinking water.

Moyale is located at the frontier between the traditional territories of the Somali and Oromo peoples living in the southwestern part of Ethiopia. Accordingly, local groups of both Somali and Oromo nationalities have a vested interest in the control of the relatively rich pastoral resources in the district and therefore have been in conflict over its control. One attempt to resolve the dispute between the two Regions was the October, 2004 referendum held in about 420 kebeles in 12 woredas across five zones of the Somali Region. According to the official results of the referendum, about 80% of the disputed areas have fallen under Oromia administration, though there were numerous allegations of voting irregularities in many of them.

== Demographics ==
The 2007 national census reported a total population for this woreda of 31,162, of whom 16,129 were men and 15,033 were women; none of its population were urban dwellers. The majority of the inhabitants said they were Muslim, with 56.34% of the population reporting they observed these beliefs, while 38.68% of the population practiced traditional beliefs, 2.88% were Protestant and 1.99% practiced Ethiopian Orthodox Christianity.

Based on figures published by the Central Statistical Agency in 2005, this woreda has an estimated total population of 128,016, of whom 60,529 were males and 67,487 were females; 25,038 or 19.56% of its population are urban dwellers, which is greater than the Zone average of 11.6%. With an estimated area of 15,575.47 square kilometers, Moyale has an estimated population density of 8.2 people per square kilometer, which is less than the Zone average of 21.1. The majority of the inhabitants belong to the Garre, although there is an organized community of the Borena clan around the town of Moyale.

The 1994 national census reported a total population for this woreda of 66,495, of whom 35,048 were men and 31,411 women; 13,962 or 21% of its population were urban dwellers at the time. (This total also includes an estimate for the inhabitants of several rural kebeles, and parts of the town of Moyale, which were not counted. These portions of the woreda were estimated to have 22,443 inhabitants, of whom 11,751 were men and 10,692 women, and 3,419 were urban dwellers of both sexes.) The four largest ethnic groups reported in Moyale were the Oromo (52.88%), the Somali (37.32%), the Burji (2.81%), and the Amhara (2.79%); all other ethnic groups made up 4.2% of the population. Oromiffa was spoken as a first language by 53.74%, 38.38% spoke Somali, 3.54% spoke Amharic, and 1.61% spoke Burji; the remaining 2.73% spoke all other primary languages reported. The majority of the inhabitants were Muslim, with 74.65% of the population having reported they practiced that belief, while 8.81% of the population said they practiced traditional beliefs, 7.34% professed Ethiopian Orthodox Christianity, and 1.57% were Protestant.
