= Dire (woreda) =

District in Oromia Region, Ethiopia

Coordinates: 4°15′N 38°15′E

Dire is one of the woredas in the Oromia Region of Ethiopia. Miyu was separated from Dire woreda. Located in the southern part of the Borena Zone, Dire is bordered on the south by Kenya, on the west by Teltele, on the north by Yabelo, on the northeast by Arero, and on the east by Moyale. Towns in Dire include Mega and Dubuluk.

== Overview ==
The altitude of this woreda ranges from 750 to over 2400 meters above sea level; Mount Gaamud (2486 meters) is the highest point. There are no rivers in this woreda. A survey of the land in this woreda shows that 14.3% is arable (7.3% was under cultivation), 47.5% pasture, 17.5% forest, and the remaining 20.7% is considered swampy, degraded or otherwise unusable. Notable landmarks include the Bowe Soda Salt House, the Gumigayo cultural center and the Boke Dilo well. Corn, haricot beans, wheat and barley are important crops.

Industry in the woreda includes 12 grain mills. Salt has been traditionally extracted from sites like the mountain craters, such as Sod or Sogid near Mega, and transported elsewhere in the Borana and south to Banaadir. However, other known mineral deposits -- olivine and garnet—have not been commercially developed. There were 31 Farmers Associations and 8 Farmers Service Cooperatives; about 59% of the farmers were pastoralists. Dire has 137 kilometers of dry-weather and 124 all-weather road, for an average road density of 96 kilometers per 1000 square kilometers. About 16.5% of the urban and 33.5% of the total population has access to drinking water.

== Demographics ==
The 2007 national census reported a total population for this woreda of 73,401, of whom 36,977 were men and 36,424 were women; 6,135 or 8.36% of its population were urban dwellers. The majority of the inhabitants said they practiced traditional beliefs, with 75.6% of the population reporting they observed these beliefs, while 15.24% of the population were Muslim, 4.41% were Protestant, 3.27% practiced Ethiopian Orthodox Christianity and 1.4% were Catholic.

Based on figures published by the Central Statistical Agency in 2005, this woreda has an estimated total population of 122,119, of whom 60,823 are men and 61,296 are women; 15,043 or 12.32% of its population are urban dwellers, which is greater than the Zone average of 11.6%. With an estimated area of 12,721.57 square kilometers, Dire has an estimated population density of 9.6 people per square kilometer, which is less than the Zone average of 21.1.

The 1994 national census reported a total population for this woreda of 86,341, of whom 43,429 were men and 42,912 women; 8,405 or 9.73% of its population were urban dwellers at the time. The three largest ethnic groups reported in Dire were the Oromo (93.9%), the Burji (2.88%), and the Amhara (1.34%); all other ethnic groups made up 1.88% of the population. The national census missed some finer details; one visitor to the woreda noted that most of the Oromo belong to the Borena clan, and other ethnic groups identified in this woreda include the Konso, Arbore and Hamer peoples. Another observer notes that a group of the Gabbra were "resettled" into the heart of Borana territory after the 1977 war with Somalia. Oromiffa was spoken as a first language by 97.39%, 1.21% spoke Amharic and 0.95% spoke Burji; the remaining 0.45% spoke all other primary languages reported. The plurality of the inhabitants practiced traditional beliefs, with 37.45% of the population reporting beliefs recorded in that category, while 11.52% of the population said they were Muslim, 5.34% professed Ethiopian Orthodox Christianity, and 3.88% were Protestant.
