= Yabelo =

Town in Oromia Region, Ethiopia

Yabelo Yaabeelloo (Oromo)
- Town
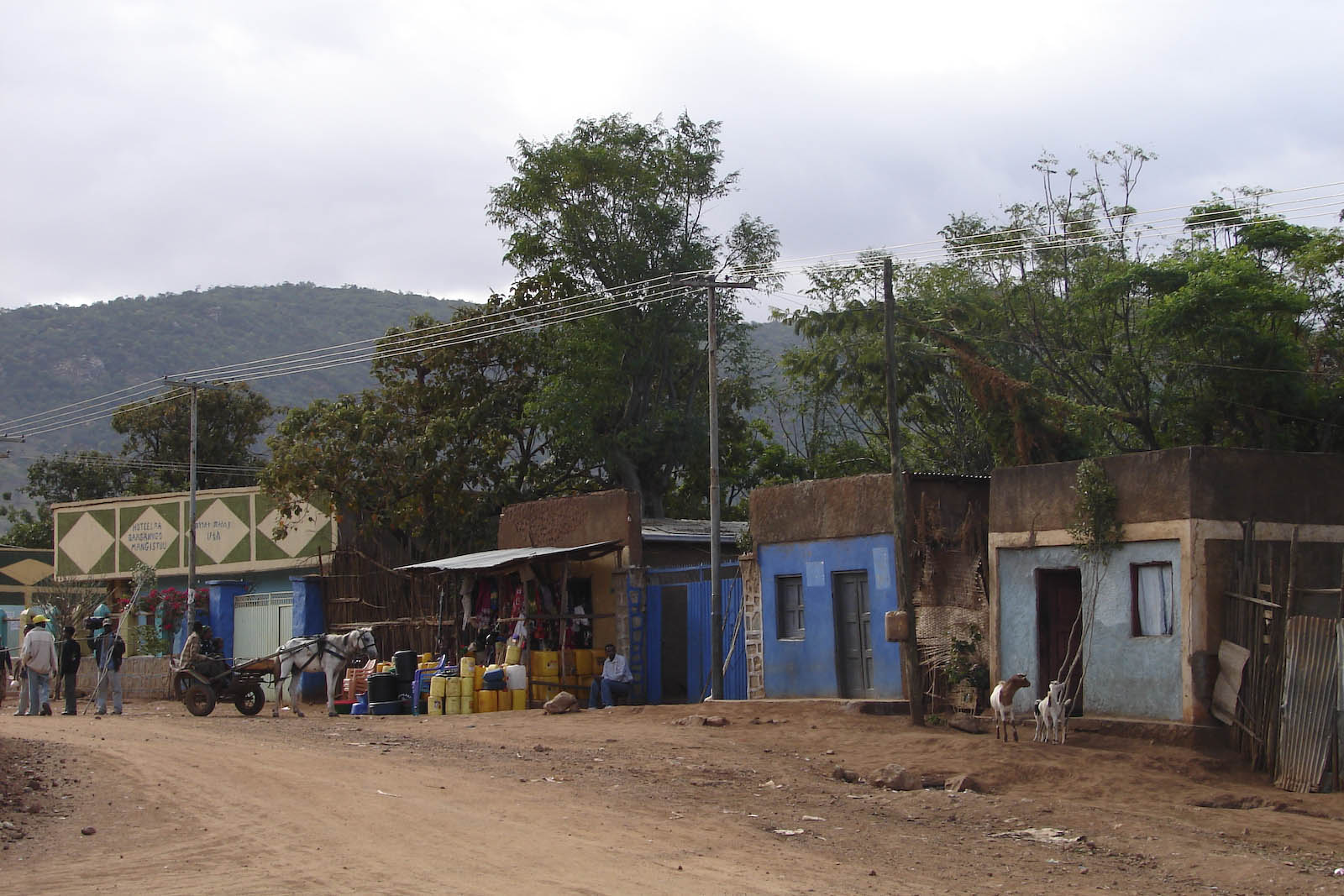
- Main street

- Location within Ethiopia
- Coordinates: 4°53′N 38°5′E
- Country: Ethiopia
- Region: Oromia
- Zone: Borana
- Woreda: Yabelo
- Elevation: 1,857 m (6,093 ft)

Population (2005)
  - Total: 86,400
- Time zone: UTC+3 (EAT)

Yabelo (Oromo: Yaabeelloo) is a town in southern Ethiopia. An alternative name for this town is Obda, which is also the name of a nearby mountain. Located northwest of Moyale in the Borena Zone of the Oromia Region, this town has a latitude and longitude of 4°53′N 38°5′E and an elevation of 1857 meters above sea level. It has been the administrative center of the Borena Zone since its division from Guji Zone in September 2002, as well as Yabelo woreda.

This town is reported to have ten gas stations, telephone service, a post office and a commercial bank, as well as at least one primary and one secondary school.

== History ==
Yabelo was entered by the Italian Laghi Division on 11 July 1936, but more formally occupied on 6 August 1936 by troops under the command of Giorgio Pollera. 15 tanks from the Yabelo garrison attempted to break through the Allied defenses around Mega, but failed; Yabelo was occupied by the Allies two days after the armored assault on 22 February 1941. The hangar the Italians had built at Yabelo was dismantled in 1952, and transported to Bishoftu by air, where it was re-erected to house the newly acquired Fairey Firefly airplanes from Canada.

The Norwegian Lutheran Mission started a missionary station at Yabelo in 1950, although the staff was reported to have made little headway in converting the locals, similar to the other Christian missionaries. In 1992, Yabelo was the site of a feeding station to combat a local famine. Conditions had grown so severe that the local Borena Oromo decided to eliminate competition from their neighbors the Gabbra. The Gabbra were killed, their livestock was stolen, and the survivors were moved from the area by CARE. In June 2004, a Rally of Pastoral Clans was held under the acacia trees of the SARDU compound in Yabelo, which included representatives from the Borena, Guji, Gabbra, Arsi and Marian clans in Dire, Liben and Moyale woredas; other attendees included government officials such as Obbo Kibre Jimmera, deputy chairman of the Parliamentary Pastoralist Affairs Standing Committee. Economic and social issues were discussed, with an emphasis of finding areas of agreement rather than discussing specific disputes.

Land clashes in June 2006 between the rival Guji and Borena Oromo clans left about 100 people dead in and around the towns of Yabelo, Arero and Shakiso. According to an aid worker in the area, between 37,000 and 39,000 people had fled from the environs of Yabelo. Currently one of the Borana clan called Wayu Oromo/Wayu Bano stated themselves to Oromia Regional state as some unawaredly Borana clan previously hindering them from many development activities in which the Derg regime computed to divide and rule system. But currently in 2014 the struggle continued not to be biased once the government of Ethiopia stated human right. This is through peaceful way actions with government strategy/policies and almost all locations where Wayu clan live in Ethiopians participated on this issue. The goal of this issue is only equality.

Rights activists in southern Oromia reported to Human Rights Watch that students, farmers, and businesspeople had been detained in Yabello. As of January 25, 2010 over 150 people, mostly affiliated with the Oromo People's Congress, were said to be still incarcerated in Yabello jail. These arrests reportedly were in response to protests about the activities of mining companies in the region, which the authorities attributed to the opposition.

== Data ==
=== Water supply ===
The water supply for the town comes from a borehole constructed in 1986, a few miles out of the town. This borehole was designed to accommodate the population of the time, which was reported to be 15,000; however, by 1996 the population had grown much larger and was estimated at 35,000. In addition, it was reported that of the two boreholes only one was functional, and the town had 7 water points at different locations. To alleviate the problem of perennial shortages and improve the provision of water, it was proposed to construct additional boreholes the following year. Yabelo is also near the Yabelo Wildlife Sanctuary, known as a habitat of rare birds, including the endemic Stresemann's bushcrow and white-tailed swallow, as well as Swayne's hartebeest.

=== Demographics ===
Based on figures from the Central Statistical Agency in 2005, Yabelo has an estimated total population of 18,478 of whom 9,551 are men and 8,927 are women. The 1994 national census reported this town had a total population of 10,322 of whom 5,180 were men and 5,142 were women.
