= Kercha =

District located in Oromia state of Ethiopia

Kercha Karchaa (Oromo)
- District
- Location within Ethiopia
- Country: Ethiopia
- Region: (Oromia Region) Oromia
- Zone: Guji Zone
- Time zone: UTC+3 (EAT)

Kercha is one of the Aanaas in the Oromia of Ethiopia. It was part of former Bule Hora district. It is part of the Guji Zone.

== Demographics ==
The 2007 national census reported a total population for this woreda of 227,362, of whom 113,882 were men and 113,480 were women; 9,884 or 4.35% of its population were urban dwellers. The majority of the inhabitants said they were Protestant, with 58.37% of the population reporting they observed this belief, while 12.85% of the population practiced traditional beliefs, 4.95% practised Ethiopian Orthodox Christianity, 3.18% were Muslim, and 2.35% were Catholic.
