= Uraga =

Uraga may refer to:

- Uraga (moth), a genus of moth

== Places ==
- Uraga (woreda), in the Oromia Region, Ethiopia
- Uraga, Kanagawa (ja:浦賀), a subdivision of the city of Yokosuka, Kanagawa Prefecture, Japan
  - Uraga Station (ja:浦賀駅)
- Uraga Channel (浦賀水道), at the south end of Tokyo Bay in Japan

== Ships ==
- Uraga class mine warfare command ship, Japan Maritime Self-Defence Forces
  - JS Uraga (MST-463)
