= Dugda Dawa =

District located in Oromia state of Ethiopia

Dugda Dawa is one of the districts in the Oromia of Ethiopia. It was part of former Bule Hora woreda. It is part of the West Guji Zone.

== Demographics ==
The 2007 national census reported a total population for this woreda of 147,327, of whom 75,114 were men and 72,213 were women; 5,560 or 3.77% of its population were urban dwellers. The majority of the inhabitants said they were Protestant, with 69.89% of the population reporting they observed these beliefs, while 22.3% of the population practiced traditional beliefs, 5.06% were Muslim and 1.15% practiced Ethiopian Orthodox Christianity.
