= Bore (Aanaa) =

District located in Oromia state of Ethiopia

Coordinates: 6°15′N 38°45′E

Bore Booree (Oromo)
- District
- Location within Ethiopia
- Country: Ethiopia
- Region: (Oromia Region) Oromia
- Zone: Guji Zone
- Time zone: UTC+3 (EAT)

Bore (Oromo: Booree) is one of the Aanaas in the Oromia of Ethiopia. Part of the Guji Zone, Bore is bordered on the south by Ana Sora, on the west by the Uraga, and on the north and east by the Southern Nations, Nationalities, and Peoples Region. The largest town in Bore is Bore.

== Overview ==
The altitude of this woreda ranges from 1800 to 2900 metres above sea level; Mount Sutaa being the highest mountain in the district is only 6 km from Bore town. Main rivers include the Gannaalee and Buqqisaa,. Before the split, notable local landmark is the Me'ee Bokkoo, next the main road to Boonbaa. This is an open field kept clear of large trees but covered with grass, and except for grazing cattle no agricultural activity is permitted there. It is considered a sacred place to the local Oromo, for it is designated where the traditional leader known as Abba Gadaa convenes the tribal assembly. A survey of the land in this woreda shows that 29% is arable or cultivable (20.9% was under annual crops), 33% pasture, 30% forest, and the remaining 8% is considered swampy, degraded or otherwise unusable. Barley, wheat, corn, teff, and horse bean are important crops. False banana, " Weesii" is widely planted and used in every day consumption. Coffee is also an important cash crop; between 20 and 50 square km are planted with it.

Industry in the woreda includes 16 grain mills, 4 wood working shops and one ceramic material factory, as well as traditional gold mining around Melka Dimtu. There are 56 Farmers Associations and 12 Farmers Service Cooperatives, but no information on membership. Bore has 82 kilometers of dry-weather and 83 all-weather road, for an average road density of 127 km per 1000 square km. About 54.6% of the urban and 37.5% of the rural population has access to drinking water.

== History ==
Bore was one of four woredas that suffered from a wildfire that was started 10 February 2000 and was not brought under control until 7 April, after it had burned a total of 70,000 hectares.

This woreda was part of the Borena Zone until it, along with four other woredas, were split off in September 2003 to create the Guji Zone.

== Tourist sites and hotels ==
Bore is a green district in the Gujii Zone. The waterfall " Gootuu" on Buqqisaa river is a must-see destination for tourist planning to visit Bore. The newly opened hotels with high-quality bedrooms added more glory to the town. Other hotels are the oldest and well-known Sammuu Waaqjiraa (shoferoch) hotel, 4-storied hotel, Dessibel hotel and many other hotels. Kene'an pension is also a newly opened high-quality accommodation.

== Demographics ==
The 2007 national census reported a total population for this woreda of 210,179, of whom 105,726 were men and 104,453 were women; 10,258 or 4.88% of its population were urban dwellers. The majority of the inhabitants said they were Protestant, with 64.12% of the population reporting they observed this belief, while 7.45% of the population practiced traditional beliefs, 4.77% practised Ethiopian Orthodox Christianity, and 1.06% were Muslim.

Based on figures published by the Central Statistical Agency in 2005, this district along with the newly formed Annaa Sorraa, has an estimated total population of 166,788, of whom 82,221 are men and 84,567 are women; 13,601 or 8.15% of its population are urban dwellers, which is less than the Zone average of 11.6%. With an estimated area of 1,296.88 square kilometers, Bore has an estimated population density of 128.6 people per square kilometer, which is greater than the Zone average of 21.1.

The 1994 national census reported a total population for this woreda along with the Annaa Sorraa was 119,120, of whom 60,672 were men and 58,448 women; 7,609 or 6.39% of its population were urban dwellers at the time. The five largest ethnic groups reported in Bore were the Oromo (86.92%), the Amhara (4%), the Gedeo (3.81%), the Sidama (3.42%), and the Silt'e (0.99%); all other ethnic groups made up 0.86% of the population. Oromiffa was spoken as a first language by 86.41%, 5.57% spoke Amharic, and 3.63% spoke Gedeo; the remaining 4.39% spoke all other primary languages reported. The majority of the inhabitants were Protestant, with 60.22% of the population having reported they practiced that belief, while 17.62% of the population said they practiced traditional beliefs, 8.47% professed Ethiopian Orthodox Christianity, 4.29% were Catholic, and 1.33% were Muslim.
