= Democratic backsliding in Ethiopia =

Political phenomenon in Ethiopia

Democratic backsliding in Ethiopia is ongoing, most notably under the administration of Prime Minister Abiy Ahmed. Since he assumed power in April 2018, Abiy has played a crucial role in reforms in Ethiopian politics and the reversal of policies implemented by the former ruling party, the Ethiopian People's Revolutionary Democratic Front (EPRDF). Abiy immediately gained public approval and international recognition owing to liberalized policymaking, including in media outlets, gender equality, internet freedom, and privatization of the economy. He was also praised for ending the 20-year conflict between Ethiopia and Eritrea, for which he was awarded the 2019 Nobel Peace Prize, being the first Ethiopian to earn the title. In 2019, Ethiopia received a score of 19 out of 100 in the Freedom in the World metric, an improvement of six points from the previous year, but still characterized as "Not Free".

In December 2019, Abiy formed the Prosperity Party by the dissolution of EPRDF and merged all its ethnic-based regional parties; the Tigray People's Liberation Front (TPLF) refused to obey, resulting in a face-off with the federal government. He promised to hold a free and fair upcoming election; however, due to the COVID-19 pandemic, deterioration, and other security and logistics issues, the election was postponed indefinitely in mid-2020. Opponents called this action an excuse to "reconsolidate dictatorship" and a "constitutional crisis". On 9 September 2020, the Tigray Regional election was held, which was deemed illegal by the federal government. According to the electoral commission, the TPLF won 98.2% of the 152 seats that were contested. The federal government and the Tigray authority's relations were aggravated by late 2020, culminating in the Tigray War.

Domestically, democracy has been eroded since the rise of armed conflicts in the country. Abiy's government declined to execute public order, and political persecution sporadically appeared by 2021. As of June 2022, 18 journalists and dissidents were jailed for allegedly disseminating misinformation to "undermine his government". By 2021, 46 journalists were detained, with many subjected to forced disappearance.

== 2018–2019 ==
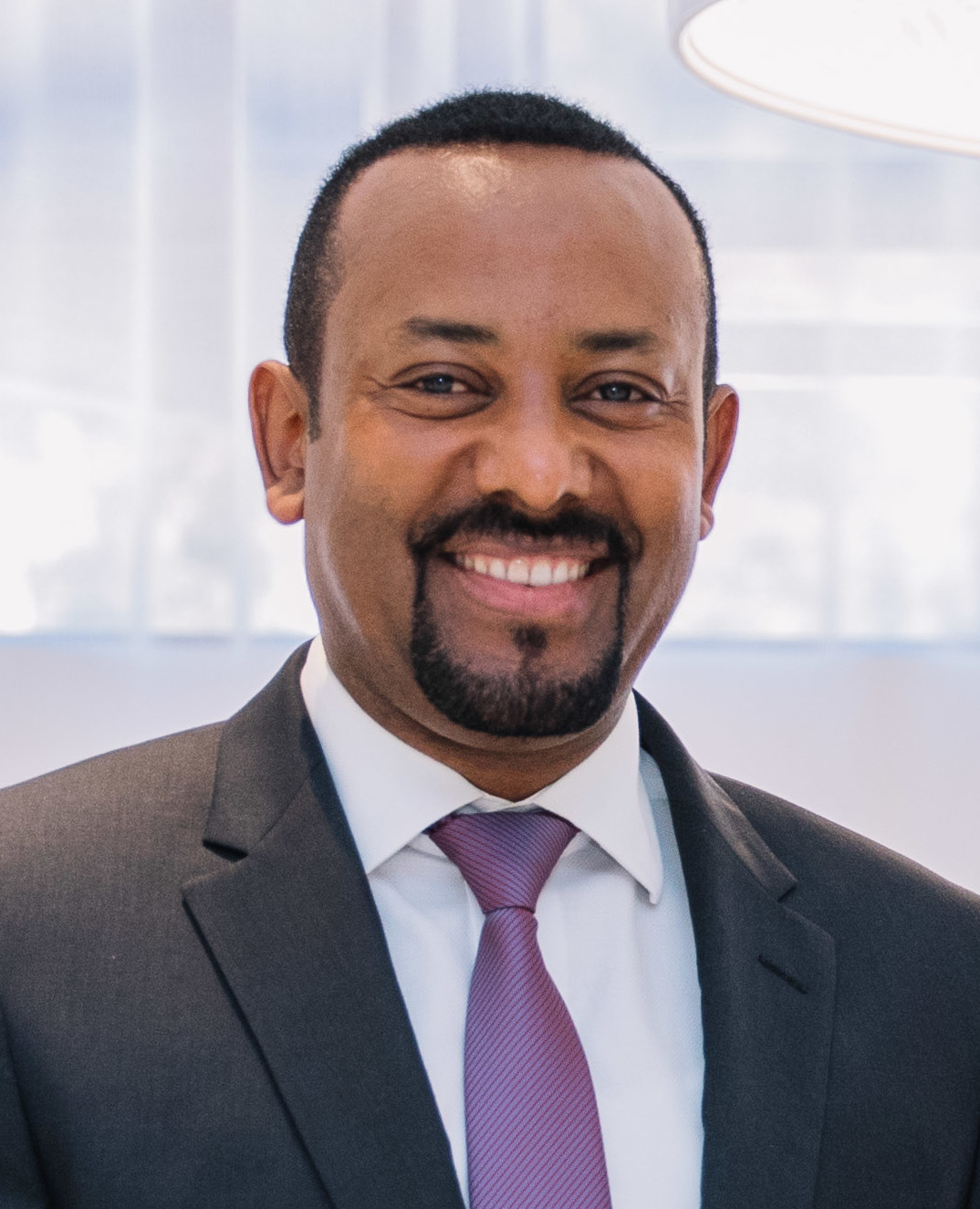
Prime Minister Abiy Ahmed in 2018

Short after assuming the role of Prime Minister in 2018, Abiy Ahmed was overwhelmingly praised by international community and gained unprecedented support by Ethiopians and diaspora community for democratic reforms including releasing political prisoners (mostly journalists imprisoned by former ruling party, the EPRDF), encouraging gender equality in his cabinet, liberalizing banned media outlets and internet censorship, and lifting the state of emergency imposed in October 2016 in June 2018. Some argued that Abiy would resolve public discontent with the government by bringing political changes that fulfill democracy and the freedom of the people. The Parliament accepted female nominees, including the first female President Sahle-Work Zewde in the Federal Supreme Court, and Abiy requested the dissents of the former ruling party to return from the United States in order to run an electoral commission. The Freedom in the World report by Freedom House compared Ethiopia's ascension of political rights and civil liberties to Malaysia; Ethiopia rose from 12 to 19, while Malaysia rose from 45 to 52.

For his effort to settle the 20 year conflict between Ethiopia and Eritrea and "increasing women's rights", Abiy was awarded the 2019 Nobel Peace Prize. The Nobel Committee supported Abiy's reform efforts "to achieve peace and international cooperation," including his "reforms that give many citizens hope for a better life and a brighter future." Abiy used "Medemer" rhetoric, which means "summing", to refer to political centralization in favor of Ethiopian nationalism and the breakup of ethnic federalism that permeated since the rule of the EPRDF in the 1990s. He published his first book of the same name in October 2019. In Abiy's words: "Medemer, an Amharic word, signifies synergy, convergence and teamwork for a common destiny. […] In essence, Medemer is an act of peace that seeks the unity of our common humanity."

In November 2019, Abiy dissolved EPRDF and merged all ethnically based regional parties to form his Prosperity Party in December 2019. The Afar, Somali, Oromia, Benishangul-Gumuz, Harari, Gambela and the Southern Nations, Nationalities, and People's regional parties were merged into the Prosperity Party; only the Tigray People's Liberation Front (TPLF) refused to merge, becoming the main opponent of Abiy's government. Abiy promised that the party would promote liberal democracy and give opportunities for the private sector. The Prosperity Party was criticized by Somali Regional government to TPLF cause. On 14 August 2021, former Vice President of the Somali Region Abdifatah Mohamoud was detained by unidentified security officers in Addis Ababa who sent him to Jijiga, where he was arbitrarily detained and released that day. According to him, the detention was enforced by Somali Region President Mustafa Mohammed Omer assisted by the Ethiopian National Intelligence and Security Service (NISS). This fueled an opposition to the party; the installation of Mustafa as president had led to Somali political instability.

== 2020–2022 ==
Abiy pledged to hold a free and fair election in May 2020, but due to logistic and security concerns, the election was postponed indefinitely, with many opposition parties and some critics calling it a "constitutional crisis". The National Election Board of Ethiopia (NEBE) announced on 31 March that the election was postponed as a result of the COVID-19 pandemic and were unable to organize the polls on before the scheduled date of 29 August. Opponents called the postponement an excuse to "reconsolidate dictatorship". The board chairperson Birtukan Mideksa announced in mid April that only half of 50,000 polling stations were operational; in Afar and the Somali Region, there were zero functional stations. During the 9 September 2020 election of the Tigray Region, the Tigray regional government did not recognize Abiy's national election; Abiy called this action "illegal", to which the Tigray authorities responded that his condemnation was "meaningless" and his constitutional term would be terminated in October 2020.

According to the head of the Tigray Region electoral commission, Muluwork Kidanemariam, the vote was conducted without further violence or complaints, with over 97% turnout. In an interview with state media, Abiy dismissed the election as having "no legal basis" and called it a "shanty election". In response, the Tigrayan authorities accused Abiy's federal government of breaching self-rule rights granted under Article 39 of the Constitution, while the federal government asserted constitutional mandate for political rights to conduct an election under Article 55.

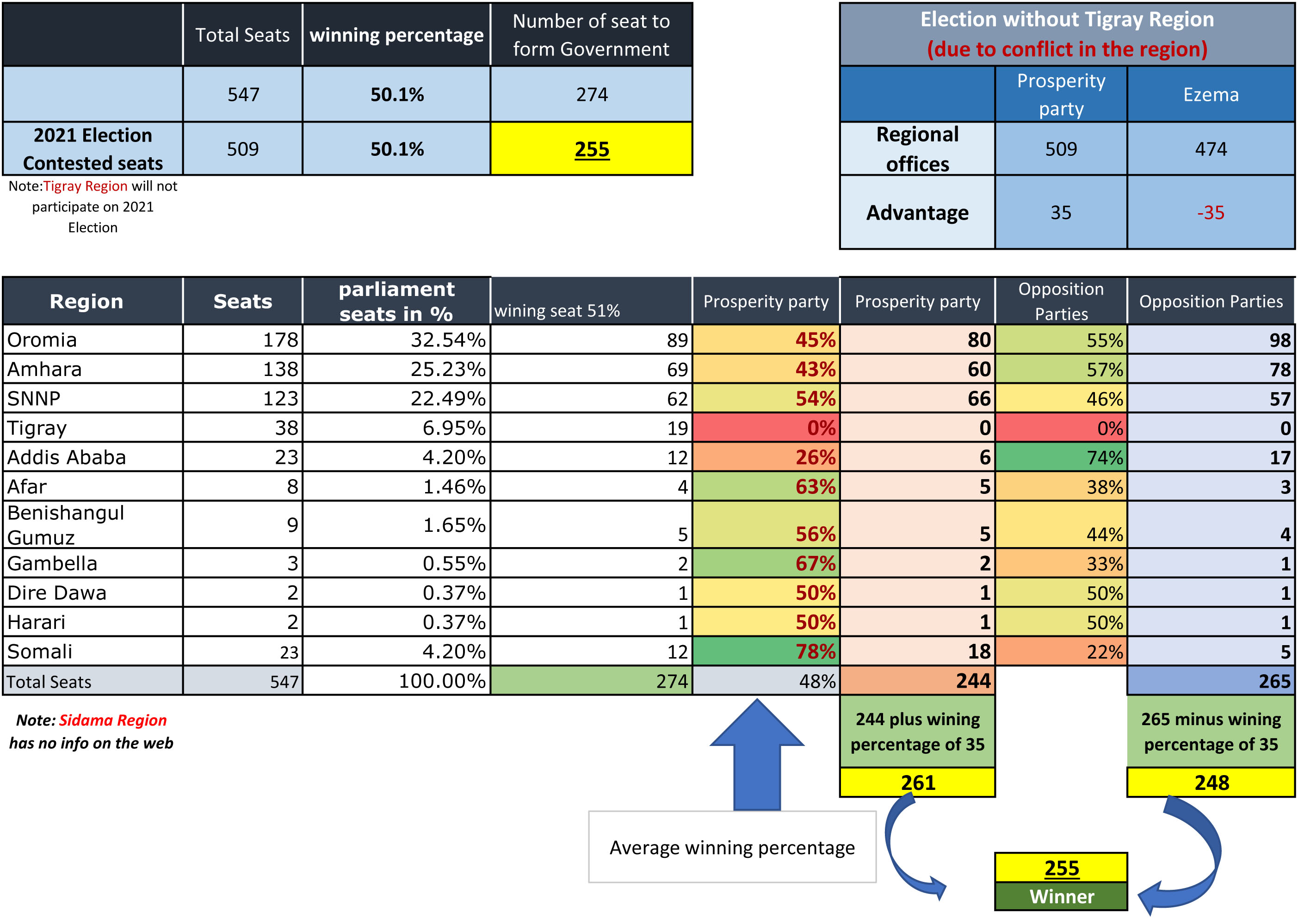
Analysis showing Prosperity Party winning by 51% in Ethiopia 2021 election

On 21 June 2021, parliamentary and regional elections were held despite the country's unrest as well as the condition of COVID-19 pandemic.

The elections were held in 436 parliamentary constituencies out of 547, with the remaining 111 constituencies (including Benishangul-Gumuz, some parts of western Oromia, the Somali and Harari Region, and several zones in the Southern Nations, Nationalities, and People's Region) expected to hold elections on 6 September due to irregularities and faulty ballot paper. The election was deemed a democratic improvement from past elections, though NEBE faced considerable logistical challenges. The Property Party won 410 seats out of 436 in the federal parliament, extending Abiy's term for five years.

=== 2022 purges ===
Abiy's government was accused of purge of opposition groups, as of June 2022, 18 journalists, YouTubers and members of Fano movement were jailed, 4,500 people were arrested in Amhara Region. The Amhara Region Prosperity Party alleged that the some of its members were suspended due to implementing long-term loan to assist their leaders and employees by negotiating with financial institution.

== 2026-present ==
The Prosperity Party has also faced criticism over the conduct and inclusiveness of the 2026 Ethiopian general election. The election was held without voting in the Tigray Region for a second consecutive general election, leaving the region without representation in the federal parliament since 2020. Critics argued that the exclusion of Tigray undermined the inclusiveness of the electoral process and further marginalized the region politically.

International media outlets, election analysts and opposition parties also questioned the credibility of the election because of the exclusion of Tigray, insecurity that prevented voting in parts of the Amhara and Oromia regions, the imprisonment or absence of prominent opposition figures, and allegations of intimidation and restrictions on political competition. Other observers noted that the inability to hold voting across significant parts of the country and the limited participation of major opposition groups raised broader questions about the legitimacy and representativeness of the electoral process.

As of May 2026, Ethiopia's government has adopted a more aggressive rhetorical tone towards its neighboring states, framing its ongoing conflicts and disputes as vital to national security. This shift has resulted in a deterioration of relations with neighboring countries such as Eritrea, Sudan, and Somalia. Tensions with Sudan have escalated over border disputes and allegations of Ethiopian involvement in Sudanese internal conflicts. Relations with Somalia have also worsened. Additionally, Ethiopia's recent diplomatic moves, including purported security agreements with Israel concerning Somaliland, in violation of the sovereignty of Somalia has further strained regional trust. This confrontational rhetoric and military posture stands in stark contrast to Prime Minister Abiy Ahmed's initial policies of reform in 2018, which was marked by the 2018 Nobel Peace Prize awarded for his efforts to end the long-standing conflict with Eritrea. His early approach aimed at regional stabilization and rapprochement, fostering peace and economic integration. However, the current posture risks reversing these gains, potentially leading Ethiopia back into cycles of conflict and destabilization. Engaging in renewed conflict, especially with Eritrea, would significantly undermine Abiy's legacy of peace and reconciliation.

In May 2026, the United States announced plans to lift sanctions against Eritrea, in light of the 2026 Iran war signaling a strategic shift amid rising geopolitical tensions in the Red Sea region. This move aims to improve U.S.-Eritrea relations and send a diplomatic message to Ethiopia, emphasizing regional stability and maritime security. According to Reuters, "The U.S. is exploring ways to reset ties with Eritrea, which controls key maritime routes, as tensions with regional actors, including Ethiopia, continue to rise".

Moreover, the U.S. government has publicly urged Ethiopia to refrain from engaging in military conflicts with neighboring states, especially in light of the broader regional tensions stemming from the Iran war and the importance of maintaining maritime stability in the Red Sea. U.S. officials have emphasized that escalation could exacerbate regional instability and threaten vital maritime routes, including the Strait of Hormuz and the Bab el-Mandeb Strait. As reported by The Globe and Mail, "The U.S. has called on Ethiopia to avoid military confrontations that could destabilize the region further, especially considering the strategic significance of the Red Sea amid the Iran war". This diplomatic shift aims to address broader regional dynamics, including conflicts in Sudan, Somalia, and Ethiopia. The global community, led by the U.S., expresses increasing concern over the risk of regional escalation, which could threaten maritime commerce and foster proxy conflicts. As Crisis Group notes, "Ethiopia’s deepening military confrontations risk drawing neighboring states into wider regional conflicts, particularly if tensions with Eritrea escalate". Foreign Affairs magazine published an article titled The War in Ethiopia Isn't Over, advocating for Ethiopia to pursue a diplomatic reset with Eritrea to reduce the risk of renewed conflict and proxy warfare. The article emphasizes that "Ethiopia’s current aggressive posture undermines the peace it once sought, and a diplomatic approach involving the U.S. could help de-escalate tensions".

Despite the tensions, Ethiopia and Eritrea maintain close cultural and historical ties rooted in their shared heritage of the ancient Aksum Empire, which introduced Christianity as the state religion in the 4th century. The Ethiopian Orthodox Tewahedo Church and the Eritrean Orthodox Tewahedo Church trace their origins to this common past. Ethnically, the Tigrinya-speaking peoples of both nations are closely related, and social bonds such as language, music, and cuisine remain strong. However, decades of war and separation caused significant damage, with mass expulsions and refugee flows affecting families on both sides. The 2018 peace agreement allowed families to reunite and communities to heal, but recent conflicts threaten to undo this progress.

== Press freedom ==
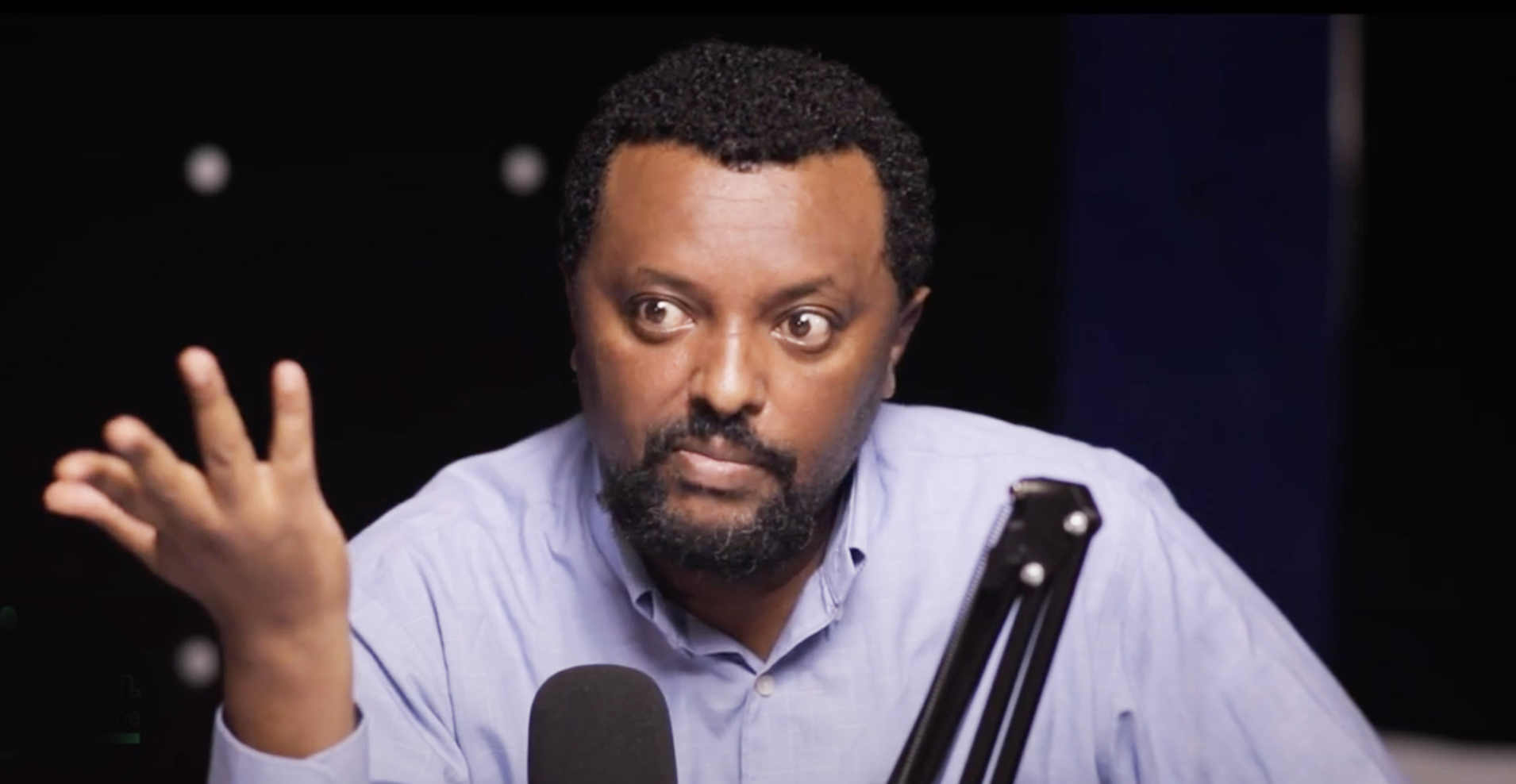
Tamerat Negera was jailed in December 2021 for alleged dissemination of misinformation and later released via bail by Oromia Supreme Court in April 2022.

In 2019, according to the World Press Freedom Index, Ethiopia's press freedom improved significantly, going from 150th to 110th out of 180 countries. Addis Ababa based journalist Berihun Adane who writes for a Berera newspaper, said "This paper exists because of Abiy's reforms. But now we are witnessing the same thing that has happened after every regime change: first there are lots of new magazines and newspapers, then the government starts to crack down on them." Activist Jawar Mohammed accused Abiy Ahmed of increasing authoritarianism following a claimed house invasion by security forces in his building, resulting in the October 2019 protests in Addis Ababa.

Since the start of the Tigray War, Ethiopia's freedom of press has declined. In 2021, 46 journalists were detained. On 3 May 2022, the state funded Ethiopian Human Rights Commission (EHRC) released a statement on the whereabouts of journalist Gobeze Sisay after plainclothes officers arrested him on 1 May.

Press watchdogs and human rights groups describe Abiy's government as "increasingly intimidating" the media as well as harassing opponents to propel unrest in regions; they also demanded the release of 16 journalists and media personnel after the new wave of arrest in Addis Ababa. Tamerat Negera, the founder and managing director of online media company Terara Network, was arrested on 10 December 2021 due to alleged dissemination of false information; the federal government took advantage of the November 2021 state of emergency to detain him without trial or charges. He also accused of "committing a variety of offense" though without collected evidence so far, and numerous charges were opened that took 100 days. On 10 March 2022, the Oromia Supreme Court ordered the prosecutors of Oromia Attorney to file any additional charges against Tamerat within 15 days, provided a reasonable indictment was available. The judges transferred him to Sabata Daliti police station in the Oromia Special Zone. He was released on 5 April 2022 with bail of 50,000 ETB.

== Freedom of religion ==
Abiy's administration is noted for religious intolerance and persecution, commonly due to doctrinal and political dominance in the country. The Meskel Square controversy occurred when the Addis Ababa City Administration, without consent, took ownership over the square. Since 2020, the government has planned to build a vegetable and fruit market under the guise of the COVID-19 pandemic. Under the mayorship of Adanech Abebe, the square's ownership was disputed between Orthodox and Protestant adherents. Abebe claimed that taxpayers built the square in Addis Ababa. The Ethiopian Orthodox said that it would provide documents for ownership from a "faithful individual who passed it on to the Ethiopian Church before several decade ago". In early 2022, clashes occurred between Ethiopian Orthodox and Protestant Christians over the Addis Ababa City administration's decision to designate Meskel Square for secular use, banning religious celebrations outside the Church.

After the Ethiopian Orthodox Church banned illegally ordained archbishops on 22 January 2023, sporadic violence against Orthodox Christians began, particularly in early February. On 4 February, clashes in West Arsi Zone and Shashamane erupted when Abune Paulos, appointed by the "Holy Synod of Oromia and Nations and Nationalities," visited Shashamane, resulting in three deaths. The Church appealed to organize peaceful demonstrations but the Ethiopian Joint Security and Intelligence Task Force restricted the demonstrations, citing intentions to "create unrest" among the faithful.

== See also ==
- Amhara genocide
- Ethnic violence in Konso
- Ethnic violence against Amaro Koore
- Galicoma massacre
- Gambela massacre
