= Miyu (woreda) =

Administrative division of Ethiopia

Miyu is one of the woredas in the Oromia Region of Ethiopia. It was separated from Dire woreda. It is part of the Borena Zone. The administrative center of Miyu is Hidi Lola.

== Demographics ==
The 2007 national census reported a total population for Miyu woreda of 50,601, of whom 25,082 were men and 25,519 were women; 3,941 or 7.79% of its population were urban dwellers. The majority of the inhabitants said they practiced traditional beliefs, with 71.59% of the population reporting they observed these beliefs, while 17.14% of the population were Muslim, 7% were Protestant, 3.83% practiced Ethiopian Orthodox Christianity and 1.79% were Catholic.
