= Dima (woreda) =

District in Oromia Region, Ethiopia

- Woreda
- Interactive map of Dima
- Location within Ethiopia
- Coordinates: 6°15′N 38°30′E
- Country: Ethiopia
- Region: Oromia
- Zone: Guji

Dama is one of the woredas in the Oromia Region of Ethiopia. It is part of the Guji Zone. It was previously part of Uraga woreda.

== Demographics ==
The 2007 national census reported a total population for this woreda of 56,896, of whom 28,152 were men and 28,744 were women; 1,439 or 2.53% of its population were urban dwellers. The majority of the inhabitants said they were Protestant, with 67.85% of the population reporting they observed this belief, while 14.78% of the population practiced traditional beliefs, and 5.91% practised Ethiopian Orthodox Christianity.
