= Kifle =

Kifle is both a surname and a given name. Notable people with the name include:

- Elias Kifle, Ethiopian journalist and activist
- Goitom Kifle, Eritrean athlete
- Yonas Kifle (born 1977), Eritrean long-distance runner
- Kifle Wodajo (1936–2004), Ethiopian politician

== See also ==
- Kifli
