= Hambela Wamena =

Administrative division of Ethiopia

Hambela Wamena is one of the woredas in the Oromia Region of Ethiopia. It is a part of the West Guji Zone and used to be a part of Uraga woreda.

== Demographics ==
The 2007 national census reported a total population for this woreda of 104,971, of whom 52,244 were men and 52,727 were women; 1,689 or 1.61% of its population were urban dwellers. The majority of the inhabitants said they were Protestant, with 73.62% of the population reporting they observed this belief, while 11.84% of the population practiced traditional beliefs, 3.97% were Muslim, 3.24% were Catholic, and 2.68% practised Ethiopian Orthodox Christianity.
