= Mohammed Hussein Al Amoudi =

Ethiopian-Saudi billionaire businessman (born 1946)

Sheikh Mohammed Hussein Al Amoudi
- Muhammad Husseen Al Amuudii محمد حسين العمودي
- Born: 21 July 1946 (age 80); Dessie, Wollo Province, Ethiopian Empire
- Occupations: Businessman; investor; billionaire
- Title: Owner and manager of Moroncha Holdings Co. Ltd. and MIDROC
- Spouse: Sofia Saleh Al Amoudi
- Children: 8

Mohammed Hussein Ali Al Amoudi (Arabic: محمد حسين علي العمودي; born 21 July 1946) is an Ethiopian-born Saudi billionaire businessman.

Born in Ethiopia to a Yemeni father from Hadhramaut and a mother from Wollo Province, he migrated to Saudi Arabia with his brother Mauricet and became a Saudi citizen.

In 2026, his net worth was estimated by Bloomberg Billionaires Index at approximately US$9.3 billion. He was also listed as Ethiopia's richest man, the second richest Saudi Arabian citizen in the world. Al Amoudi made his fortune in construction and real estate before branching out to buy oil refineries in Sweden and Morocco. He is the largest individual foreign investor in Ethiopia and a major investor in Sweden.

== Business activities ==
Al Amoudi owns a broad portfolio of businesses in construction, energy, agriculture, mining, hotels, healthcare and manufacturing amongst others. His businesses are largely to be found within two conglomerate holding and operating companies, Corral Petroleum Holdings and MIDROC, both which he owns and manages. He employs over 70,000 people through these companies.

Al Amoudi's construction company consortium, Mohammed International Development Research and Organization Companies, also known as MIDROC, won a contract to build Saudi Arabia's estimated $30 billion nationwide underground oil storage complex in 1988. MIDROC acquired Yanbu Steel in Saudi Arabia in 2000.

In addition to his business interests in Ethiopia, he also owns oil refineries in Morocco and Sweden (Svenska Petroleum Exploration AB) and is engaged in energy exploration and production off West Africa and elsewhere. His Addis Ababa Sheraton is said to be among the finest hotels in Africa.

In 2010 he pledged US$275 million alongside other Saudi and South Korean investors through MIDROC to finance a factory to build Saudi Arabia's first car, to be called Gazal-1, in a project initiated by King Saud University and, in September 2011, it was announced that he planned to invest around US$1.07bn (4bn Saudi Riyals) in two major Saudi industrial projects (phosphate derivatives and sulfur) in Ras Al-Khair [Eastern Region] and Jubail Industrial City respectively.

=== Ethiopian investments ===
Al Amoudi has invested in Ethiopia since the mid-1980s. He now has business interests there, largely operated through MIDROC Ethiopia which was created in 1994. In 2011, it made 1.4bn birr (US$70M) of profits.

=== Natural resources ===
He has gold mining interests in Ethiopia and it is reported that MIDROC Gold Mine (a subsidiary of MIDROC Ethiopia) has paid the Ethiopian government 100.1 million birr in royalties, the largest contribution of any mining company. Midroc Gold is Ethiopia's sole gold exporter. Its Lega Dembi Mine has a yearly average production of around 4,500 kg of gold and silver.

He owns 70% of National Oil Ethiopia, which competes with YBF, TAF OIL and five other companies in the national petrol market and is establishing a steel plant (Tossa) in Amhara. This latter is Ethiopia's first industrial steel production plant and in intended to meet a major increase in domestic demand, estimated to rise from 1.2m tonnes to 3.1m tonnes per annum between 2011 and 2014.

In February 2011, Al Amoudi acquired 69% of Ethiopia's sole tyre manufacturer Addis Tyre and he has a substantial investment in cement production through Durba Midroc which was founded in 2008. His major cement plant near Chancho was backed in part by the World Bank's International Finance Corporation. In July 2011, it was announced that the Ethiopian Electric Power Company (EEPco) would provide the Derba cement plant with 50 MW of electricity.

=== Agriculture ===
The Al Amoudi-owned Saudi Star Agricultural Development Plc plans to develop up to 500,000 hectares (1,200,000 acres) of Ethiopian land for sugar, edible oil, and grain production. In March 2011, Saudi Star announced a further investment of $2.5 billion in Ethiopian rice projects. Some 10,000 hectares have been taken up in 60-year leases and the company plans to rent an additional 290,000 hectares. The company had reportedly purchased $80 million in equipment from Caterpillar Inc.

In August 2011, President Girma Wolde-Giorgis of Ethiopia stated that "a substantial investment in agricultural development was key to improving the quality of life across Africa" and that Saudi Star's investment programme would benefit both Ethiopia and its important trading partner, Saudi Arabia.

Al Amoudi also owns land used to produce coffee. Of the 2,295 hectares (5,670 acres) of land acquired by Ethio Agri-CEFT (which he owns) in the Sheka Zone of Ethiopia, it has only covered 1,010 hectares with coffee and shade trees, with the rest remaining as natural vegetation. In 2011, he donated 10 million birr (US$500000) to the proposed Ethiopian National Coffee Museum in Ethiopia's Kaffa Zone.

In September 2011, in response to an appeal from Prime Minister Meles Zenawi for popular support for the financing of the Renaissance Dam in North West Ethiopia which will triple the country's hydro-electric power, Al Amoudi pledged a donation of 1.5bn birr (around US$88M).

== Arrest and captivity ==
On 4 November 2017, Al Amoudi was arrested upon the orders of Crown Prince Mohammad bin Salman and held captive in Saudi Arabia in a "corruption crackdown" conducted by Mohammed bin Salman's "royal anti-corruption" committee. Finally, he was released on 27 January 2019 after 14 months of detention.

== Philanthropy ==
Al Amoudi has committed funds to support healthcare and sport in Saudi Arabia, the US, Europe and Africa. He funded a breast cancer research centre at King Abdulaziz University.

In 2008, Al Amoudi funded King Saud University's an enhanced oil recovery research chair. He also fully funded the King Abdullah Institute for Nanotechnology at King Saud University.

Al Amoudi was named as one of the William J. Clinton Foundation Donors, according to information released as part of an obligation placed on former President Clinton when he supported Hillary Clinton's nomination as Secretary of State. He is reported to have donated between US$5m and US$10m to the foundation.

Al Amoudi sponsored the CECAFA Cup, Africa's oldest football cup competition, in 2005 and 2006, the tournament was named the Al Amoudi Senior Challenge Cup as a result in those years. He also supports Ethiopian Premier League Club Saint George S.C. and covered the medical expenses of one of Ethiopia's most celebrated footballers, Mengistu Worku, before his death in December 2010. In 2011, he pledged 100 million Ethiopian birr for a stadium and access road in Mek'ele. In January 2017, The Sheikh Mohammed Hussein Ali Al-Amoudi Stadium was opened. The Stadium reportedly cost more than $22 million, and took four and a half years to complete.

== Defamation actions ==
In December 2010 Al Amoudi initiated a claim in the English High Court against Elias Kifle of the Washington, D.C.–based Ethiopian Review claiming damages for libel. In July 2011 Kifle was ordered to pay £175,000 in damages for publishing false information.

The Ethiopian Review had also repeated unwarranted material relating to his family and to matters previously dealt with in the Al Amoudi v. Brisard case of 2005. M. Brisard had made serious and unwarranted allegations concerning engagement in the funding of terrorism in the wake of 9/11 but had subsequently apologised for the accusation. The judge found the statements to be untrue and stated that Al Amoudi "is implacably opposed to terrorism in all its forms”.

== Honors and recognition ==
Al Amoudi has been ranked among the 100 richest people by Forbes since 2006, being ranking 82nd on the list in 2015. He was awarded an honorary doctorate from Addis Ababa University and has been honoured with the Order of the Polar Star by King Carl XVI Gustaf of Sweden.

Al Amoudi was honoured for his achievements in economics and philanthropy at the 19th Arab Economic Forum Summit in 2011, with special reference to his commitment to sustainable development.

== Personal life ==
Al Amoudi was born in the north-central Ethiopian city of Dessie and brought up in the nearby town of Weldiya. He was born to a father of Hadhrami Yemeni origin and an Ethiopian mother. His father Al-Hajj Sheikh Husayn Ali Al-Amoudi was a local businessman settled in Ethiopia who traded in spices and coffee, he was from the Mashaikh Al-Amoudi tribe. He grew up in Ethiopia, before emigrating to Saudi Arabia with his brother Mauricet and becoming a Saudi citizen.

According to the BBC, Al Amoudi splits his residence between central London, Surrey and Saudi Arabia. He is married to Sofia Saleh Al Amoudi. They have eight children. In July 2024, Al Amoudi announced return to Ethiopia after his departure in 2017, with Rolls-Royce Spectre.
