= Habte Giyorgis Dinagde =

Ethiopian army commander (1851–1926)

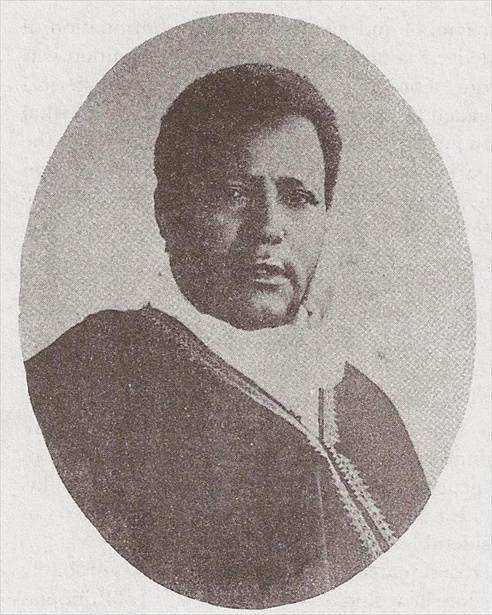

Chief Minister
- In office 1906–1926
- Monarchs: Lij Iyasu; Zewditu I
- Preceded by: Office Established
- Succeeded by: Tafari Makonnen

Minister of War
- In office 1896–1926
- Monarch: Menelik II
- Preceded by: Office Established
- Succeeded by: Mulugeta Yeggazu

Personal details
- Born: c. 1851 Shewa
- Died: 12 December 1926 (aged 75–76) Addis Ababa, Ethiopian Empire
- Occupation: Military officer; diplomat; court official

Military service
- Allegiance: Ethiopian Empire
- Battles/wars: First Italo-Ethiopian War: Battle of Adwa; Battle of Segale (1916) Menelik's Expansions

Fitawrari Habte Giyorgis Dinagde (Amharic: ሀብተ ጊዮርጊስ ዲነግዴ; c. 1851 – 12 December 1926) also known by his horse name Abba Mala was an Ethiopian military commander and government official who, among several other posts, served as President of the Council of Ministers and as Minister of War during the reigns of Menelik II, Zewditu and Haile Selassie. He was also Shum or Governor of Borena, Ibat, and Mecha.

== Early life ==
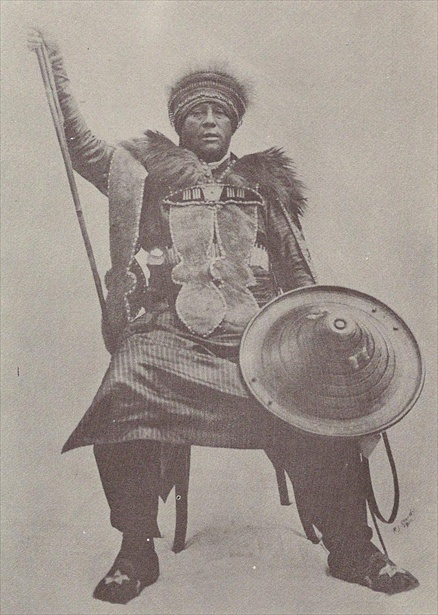
Habte Giyorgis in traditional Shewan armors

Fitawrari Habte Giyorgis Dinagde was born in Čabo, a district in Southwestern Shewa bordering the Oromia region and also a native of Waliso. His ethnicity is disputed with claims that he was an ethnic Gurage. and others claiming he was an ethnic Oromo. Professor Lapiso states that Habte Girogis Dinagde was initially captured fighting under the Hadiya army led by Hassan Enjamo, he would however later switch allegiance and assist the Abyssinians in defeating the Hadiyans. He was later trained in the art of warfare and promoted to a high rank in the empire's army under Emperor Menelik II. His early life isn't well documented, though many believe he came from a humble family. He was later taken to Ankober, Menelik's Shewan capital, before Addis Ababa. As a young man he joined the forces of Menelik, then-King of Shewa.

== Military career ==
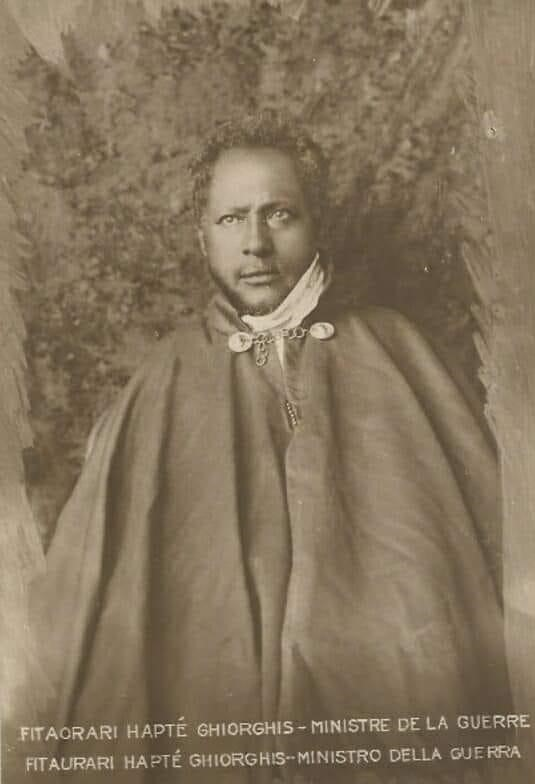
Habte Giyorgis as Minister of War

Habte Giyorgis played a leading role in several important battles of Ethiopian history. In one of Menelik's expeditions Habte Giyorgis was raised from a junior officer to a lieutenant because of his bravery and talent in the early 1890s. He participated in many battles, including the Battle of Adwa. In October 1896 Habte Giyorgis was appointed as chief of the army after Fitawrari Gabayahu Gurmu (Abba Gora) was killed during the Battle of Adwa.

=== Borena Campaign ===
During Menelik's expansion of the empire between 1897 and 1898 Habte Giyorgis was assigned in subjugating the Borena region. After raising an army of 15,000, Fitawrari Habte Giyorgis set out for Borena in June 1897 from West Shewa. On July 31, his army arrived at Borena at a place called Sogida in which they built a fort at Mega. The Abba Gadaa of Borena, Addi Doyyo, with the advice of the local Gadaa assembly decided submit to Fitawrari Habte Giyorgis's army to avoid war. After his successful campaign in Borena, Menelik made Habte Giyorgis Shum, equivalent as governor, of Borena adding the Shewan provinces of "Mecha and Jibat as a reward".

=== Deposing of Lij Iyasu ===
During the deposing of Lij Iyasu, Fitawrari Habte Giyorgis led the army against forces loyal to Lij Iyasu. He was the commanding General during the Battle of Segale in which Fitawrari Habte Giyorgis's army decisively defeated Lij Iyasu's father Negus Mikael of Wollo.

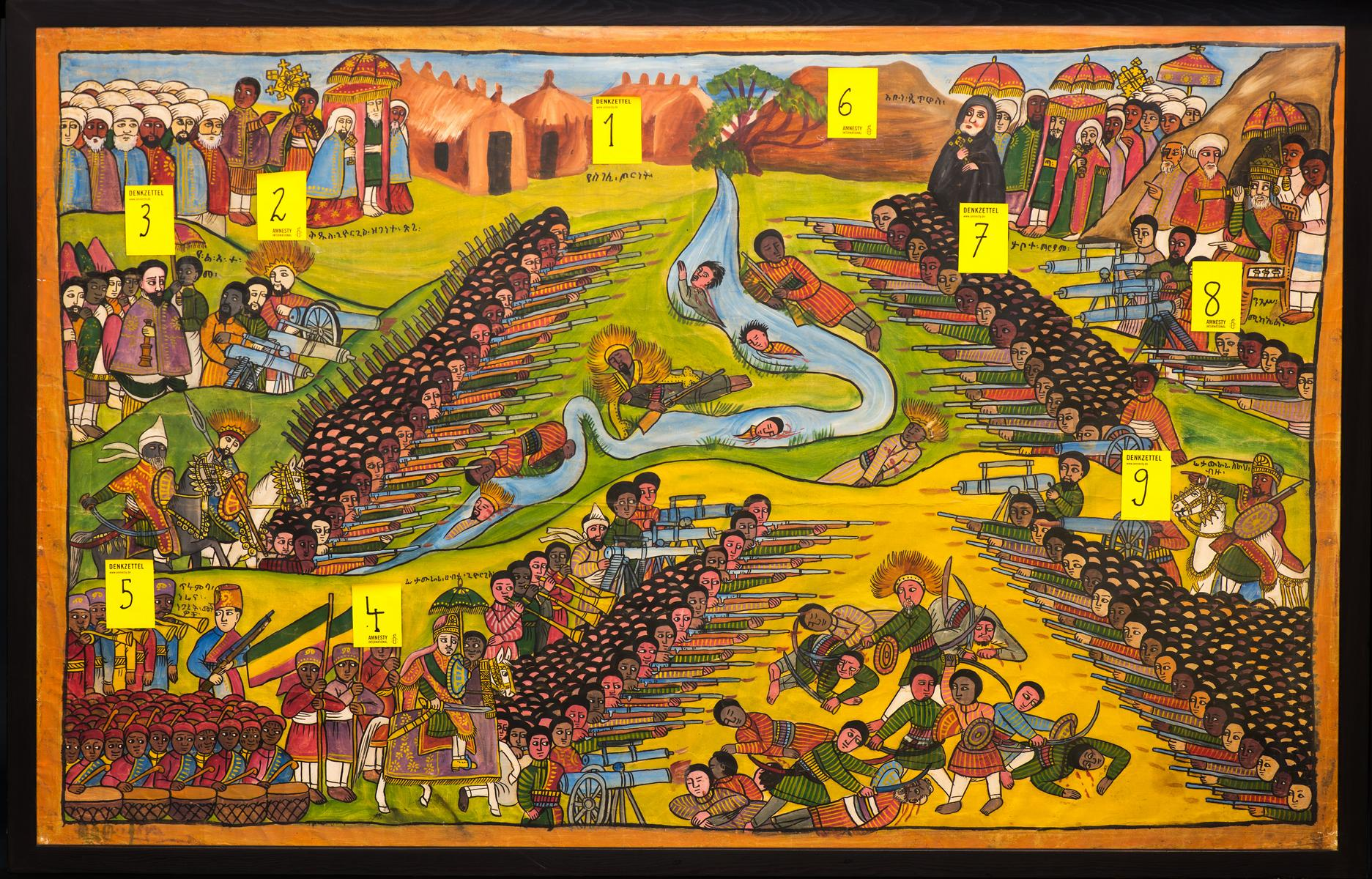
Habte Giyorgis lead the army during the Battle of Segale between supporters of Zewditu and Lij Iyasu. Habte Giyorgis is labeled as #4. “Fitawrari” (generalissimo) “Habta-Giorgis” in Geéz

== Political potentiate ==
However, he grew to become a skilled military leader and statesman. He was also a central figure in the coup which removed Taytu from power during the period of Menelik II's incapacitation as well as the 1916 coup which deposed Lij Iyasu and put Empress Zewditu in power.

From 1909 to 1926, Habte Giyorgis was Chief Minister (equivalent to the late title of Prime Minister) of the Council of Ministers to the Emperor of Ethiopia. He was an important figure in the Ethiopian Empire often cited for his great skills as military commander and judiciary.

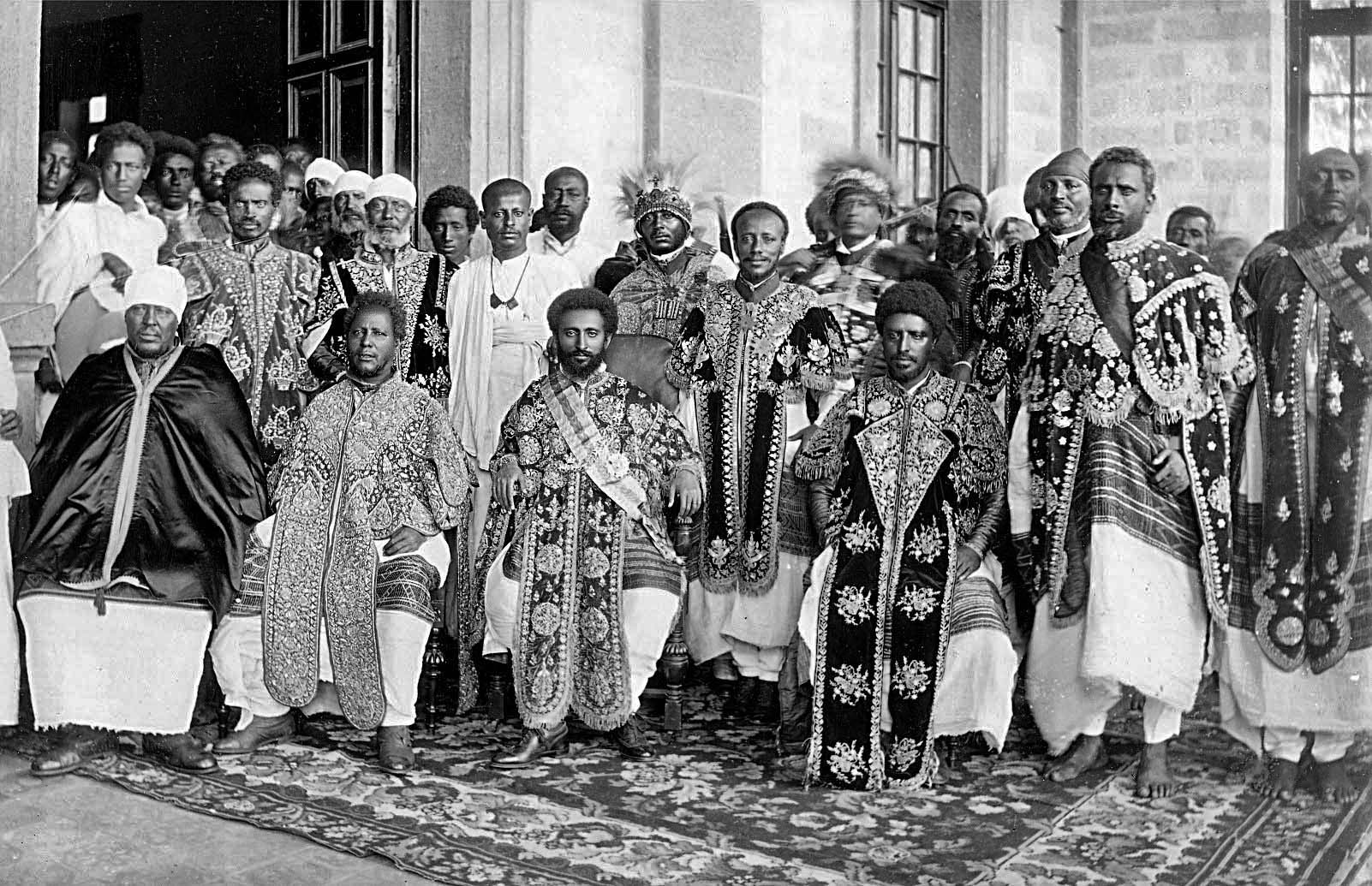
Habte Giyorgis is siting to the left of regent Ras Tafari Makonnen with the Imperial Court.

== Legacy ==
A street in Addis Ababa is named after him. He is still today renowned for his wisdom, judiciary, and his military skills.

== See also ==
- Ethiopian historiography
- Ethiopian Empire
- List of emperors of Ethiopia
