= Ethiopian Review =

Ethiopian magazine

- Editor: Elias Kifle
- Publisher: Elias Kifle
- Founder: Hailu Indashaw and Elias Kifle
- Founded: 1991
- Country: Ethiopia
- Language: English and Amharic
- Website: ethiopianreview.com
- ISSN: 1056-2354

The Ethiopian Review is an Ethiopian news and opinion magazine published in English and Amharic.

== History ==
The Ethiopian Review was launched in 1991 by Hailu Indashaw, publisher, and Elias Kifle, editor. In 1995, Elias Kifle became publisher, and Elias Wondimu—the owner of TSEHAI Publishers—became the editor.

In 2000, Elias Kifle became publisher and editor-in-chief. He also discontinued the print version and turned it into an online magazine.

== Libel ==
The Ethiopian Review repeated unwarranted material relating to the Sheikh's family and to matters previously dealt with in the Al Amoudi v. Brisard case of 2005. M. Brisard had made serious and unwarranted allegations concerning engagement in the funding of terrorism in the wake of the September 11 attacks but had subsequently apologised for the accusation. The judge found the statements to be untrue and stated that Al Amoudi "is implacably opposed to terrorism in all its forms".

In December 2010, Mohammed Hussein Al Amoudi initiated a claim in the English High Court of Justice against Elias Kifle claiming damages for libel. In July 2011, Kifle was ordered to pay £175,000 in damages for publishing false information.

== See also ==
- Addis Fortune
- Yeroo
- The Reporter (Ethiopia)
