= Arero =

District in Oromia Region, Ethiopia

Arero Areeroo (Oromo)
- Woreda
- Interactive map of Arero
- Location within Ethiopia
- Coordinates: 4°40′N 39°00′E
- Country: Ethiopia
- Region: Oromia
- Zone: Borena

Population (2007 est.)
  - Total: 103,348
- Time zone: UTC+3 (EAT)

Arero is a woreda in Oromia Region, Ethiopia. Part of the Borena Zone, Arero is bordered on the southwest by Dire, on the west by Yabelo, on the north by Bule Hora, on the northeast by the Guji Zone, on the east by the Somali Region, and on the south by Moyale; the Dawa River, the only river in this woreda, separates Arero from Odo Shakiso and Liben. Towns in Arero include Meta Gefersa.

== Overview ==
The altitude of this woreda ranges from 750 to 1700 meters above sea level. A survey of the land in this woreda shows that 20% is arable (1.7% was under cultivation), 40.3% pasture, 1.6% forest, and the remaining 38.1% is considered swampy, mountainous or otherwise unusable. The forested area includes Arero State Forest, which covers about 10.65 square kilometers and is the most southerly of the high forests of Ethiopia, one of the few places in the Borena Zone with well-grown trees of Juniperus procera. Teff, corn, haricot bean and wheat are important crops in this woreda.

Industry in the woreda includes 2 grain mills; deposits of gold, molybdenum, cobalt and graphite are present but have not been commercially developed. There were 11 Farmers Associations with 7624 members and 4 Farmers Service Cooperatives; about 40% of the farmers are pastoralists. Arero has 260 kilometers of dry-weather roads, for an average road density of 24 kilometers per 1000 square kilometers. About 33.8% of the urban and 12.5% of the rural population has access to drinking water.

In April 2005, ethnic conflict between the Guji Oromo and the Gabbra in southern Oromia led to massive displacement of people. An NGO working in the area reported as many as 50,000 people were forced to flee in Hagere Mariam, Yabelo and Arero woredas, and several thousand huts burnt.

== Demographics ==
The 2007 national census reported a total population for this woreda of 48,126, of whom 24,281 were men and 23,845 were women; 3,004 or 6.24% of its population were urban dwellers. The majority of the inhabitants said they practiced traditional beliefs, with 67.73% of the population reporting they observed these beliefs, while 22.67% of the population were Muslim, 6.82% were Protestant and 2.62% practiced Ethiopian Orthodox Christianity.

Based on figures published by the Central Statistical Agency in 2005, this woreda has an estimated total population of 44,020, of whom 21,679 are men and 22,341 are women; 7,338 or 16.67% of its population are urban dwellers, which is greater than the Zone average of 11.6%. With an estimated area of 10,841.88 square kilometers, Arero has an estimated population density of 4.1 people per square kilometer, which is less than the Zone average of 21.1.

The 1994 national census reported a total population for this woreda of 30,800, of whom 15,644 were men and 15,156 women; 4,099 or 13.31% of its population were urban dwellers at the time. (This total also includes an estimate for the inhabitants of several rural kebeles, which were not counted; they were estimated to have 9,228 inhabitants, of whom 4,714 were men and 4,514 women.) The largest ethnic group reported in Arero was the Oromo (97.23%); Oromiffa was spoken as a first language by 98.6% of the inhabitants. The plurality of the inhabitants practiced traditional beliefs, with 39.68% of the population reporting answers in that category, while 22.41% of the population said they were Muslim, 4.04% professed Ethiopian Orthodox Christianity, 2.35% were Protestant, and 2.3% were Catholic.
