= Svenska Petroleum Exploration AB =

Swedish oil company

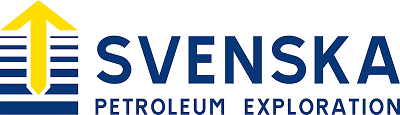
- Type: Private
- Industry: Oil and gas
- Founded: 1969
- Founder: Swedish Government
- Headquarters: Stockholm, Sweden
- Key people: Fredrik Öhrn (CEO)
- Revenue: ▲USD 172 million (2018)
- Operating income: ▲USD 88 million (2018)
- Net income: ▲USD 55 million (2018)
- Number of employees: ▼27 (2018)
- Website: www.svenska.com

Svenska Petroleum Exploration AB (Svenska) is a Swedish-based oil company in offshore production. The company is fully owned by Petroswede AB, a privately held holding company, which in turn is indirectly owned by Sheikh Mohammed H. Al-Amoudi.

Svenska's operation activities are focused on West Africa and the Baltic region with the head office in Stockholm, Sweden and London the United Kingdom. The production operations are currently (2019) based in Ivory Coast, whilst exploration activities are focused on West Africa and Latvia.

== Ownership structure ==
Svenska Petroleum Exploration is wholly owned by Sheikh Mohammed H. Al-Amoudi since 1996.

== Overview ==
Svenska Petroleum Exploration (Svenska) dates back to 1969, when Oljeprospektering AB (OPAB ) was founded. OPAB was an initiative from the Swedish government and a number of Swedish private enterprises (AGA, Boliden, Gränges and Sydkraft) to respond to the vast potential of a growing energy market. The company's mission was of national concern and thus sought to explore and produce hydrocarbons in Sweden. In 1973, a second initiative, Petroswede, was established. Also based on a 50/50 state-private ownership structure, Petroswede's objective was to search for new opportunities beyond the shores of Sweden. In 1979, the state-owned refining & marketing company Svenska Petroleum acquired parts of Petroswede and launched the new company in the name of Svenska Petroleum Exploration. Svenska entered into an agreement with OPAB to operate all of its fields and take over staff and premises.

In 1986 Svenska Petroleum and Oljekonsumenternas Förbund (OK Union) merged and created OK Petroleum (OKP). In 1991 the Swedish State's interest was sold to OKP which became the sole owner of the company. In 1994 Sheikh Mohammed H. Al-Amoudi acquired OKP through his investment company Moroncha Holdings and in 1996 OKP became Preem Petroleum and divested its shares in Svenska to a newly established holding company that inherited the name Petroswede (through Moroncha Holdings). OPAB became a wholly owned subsidiary of Svenska after the acquisition of Sydkraft's shares.

Svenska has an asset portfolio with offshore operations in Ivory Coast, Nigeria, and Latvia.
