= Shakiso Airport =

Airport in Ethiopia

- IATA: SKR; ICAO: HASK

Summary
- Airport type: Public
- Serves: Shakiso
- Elevation AMSL: 5,800 ft / 1,768 m
- Coordinates: 5°41′30″N 38°58′30″E

Map
- Location of the airport in Ethiopia

Runways
Direction	Length		Surface
Direction	ft	m	Surface
07/25	4,985	1,520	Dirt
- Source: Google Maps

Shakiso Airport (IATA: SKR, ICAO: HASK) is an airport serving the town of Shakiso of the Oromia Region in Ethiopia.

== See also ==
- Transport in Ethiopia
