= Mega, Ethiopia =

Town located in Oromia state of Ethiopia

Mega Maggaa (Oromo)
- Location within Ethiopia
- Coordinates: 4°01′N 38°15′E
- Country: Ethiopia
- Region: Oromia
- Zone: Borena
- Elevation: 1,470 m (4,820 ft)

Population (2005)
  - Total: 9,370
- Time zone: UTC+3 (EAT)

Mega is a town in southern Ethiopia. Located between Moyale and Yabelo on the paved highway south to Kenya, in the Borena Zone of the Oromia, this town has a latitude and longitude of 4°01′N 38°15′E with an elevation of 1740 meters above sea level. Named for a nearby mountain, this town is the administrative center of Dire woreda.

This town is reported to have telephone service and a post office, as well as at least one primary and one secondary school and financial institutions.

== History ==
The katama of Mega was established in 1899 after the occupation of Borena by Fitawrari Habte Giyorgis. This was followed by the coming of many settlers from Shewa, Amhara and even Tigray. In the early part of the twentieth century, it was important as the residence for Sir Arnold Weinholt Hodson, British Consul for Southern Ethiopia between 1914-1923. The British manned the consulate at least as late as the 1950s.

Mega was captured by the Italians on 25 June 1936, then occupied by a South African Brigade in February 1941 after prolonged fighting with the Italian garrison. During the Italian occupation, Mega became an important hub of communications for this part of Ethiopia, but when David Buxton passed through in the later 1940s after the Italians had been defeated, he found that "there is little traffic in these days, and Mega has almost reverted to the sleepy remoteness of pre-Italian times."

After a lack of success in Moyale, in 1951 the Norwegian Lutheran Mission moved their station from that town north to Mega, which continued at least as late as the 1970s. Travellers going from Mega to Moyale were ambushed at a place named Karbete Bonaya Wale on 2 February 1999 by fighters of the Oromo Liberation Front. Amongst the six killed was a commander Abdulla Mohammed alias Aliyyi Mohammed.

== Demographics ==
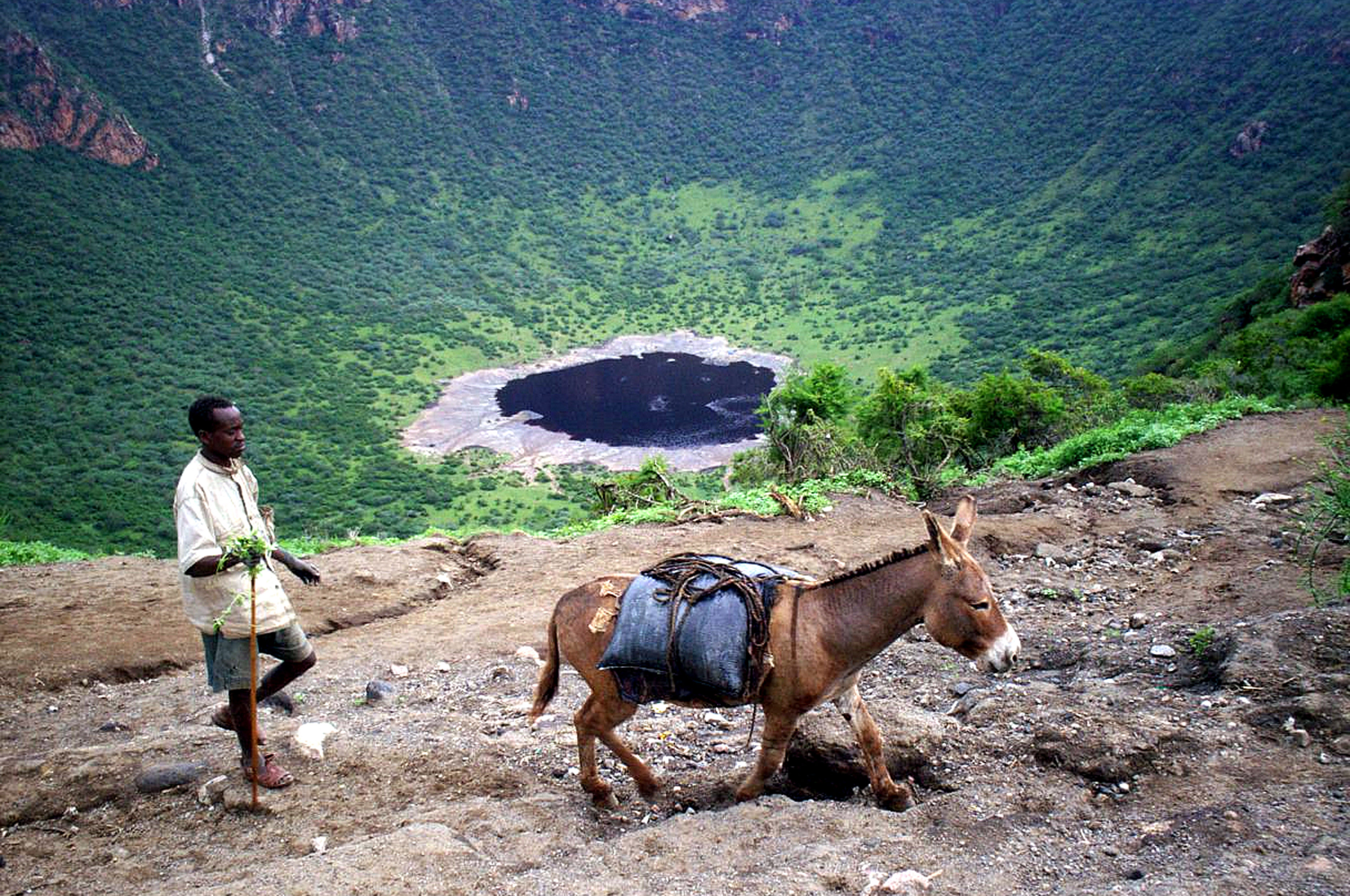
Soda Ye’Isate Gemora Āf, 30km from Mega

Based on figures from the Central Statistical Agency in 2005, Mega has an estimated total population of 9,370 of whom 4,766 are men and 4,604 women. The 1994 national census reported this town had a total population of 5,237 of whom 2,585 were men and 2,652 women.
