= Ethnic violence against Amaro Koore =

Violence against the Koore people in Ethiopia

- Part of the conflicts in the Horn of Africa and Ethiopian civil conflict (2018–present)
- Amaro (Ethiopia)
- Duration: 1994–present
- Location: Amaro woreda zone, Gedeo, West Guji, Ethiopia
- Type: Ethnic violence: Civilians and farmers killed and injured; Hundreds of IDPs; Homes burned down; Livestocks stolen
- Theme: Ongoing ethnic violence
- Cause: Land drawn along ethnic lines (Ethnic federalism)
- Motive: Dispute over administrative land, leadership and territory
- Participants: OLF or OLF-shene (Southern Nations, Nationalities, and Peoples' Region) Militants from various ethnic groups in SNNPR; Oromia regions
- Deaths: 52+ killed, 15+ injured. Ongoing

This is part of the series of violence between minorities in the Southern Nations, Nationalities, and Peoples' Region (SNNPR) and West Guji Zone of the Oromia regions, causing frequent attacks against ethnic Koore and other minorities in the Amaro special woreda and surroundings. Ethiopian Human Rights Council underscored the increasingly frequent nature and spread of conflicts and security issues in the area and called for preventative measures.

== Background and events of the conflict ==
This section lists the background on the frequent conflicts that occurred in disputed administrative lands shared between the SNNPR and Oromia regions, which is often referred to as West Guji.

Period	Event and land administration	Description	Date
pre-1980s	Historical land occupation by the Guji and Koore people	Eviction of the Guji and Koore people by the State, annexation of their land to the Nechisar park in early 1980s	Historical
pre-1994	Previous administration was under the Sidamo Province	Occasional interpersonal disputes were resolved with communal councils	Historical
During EPRDF	The start of Ethnic federalism	Administration of lands with ethnic lines. The Guji Oromo fell under the Oromia region, a portion of them inhabited areas of SNNPR. The Gedeo continued in SNNPR	1994
During EPRDF	Expansion and disputes between SNNPR	Expansion of the newly drawn Oromia regional state to the small zones in SNNPR that share borders	During EPRDF
During EPRDF	Referendums and conflict	Clashes, killings and displacement	1995 to 1998
During EPRDF	Amaro-Guji clashes	13 people killed, houses burned down, over 400 IDPs	29 July 2017
During Prosperity Party	Political "superiority" of the Guji Oromo following the Oromo-led ruling in the country	Clashes, killings and displacement	2018 onwards
During Prosperity Party	Economic and political upper-hand of the Guji Oromo against Amaro, Gedeao and others in the conflict areas	Frustration caused widespread conflict, killings and displacement	2018 onwards
During Prosperity Party	The Gedeo-West Guji displacement	One million people displaced	April 2018
During Prosperity Party	Attack in Amaro	OLF gunmen killed 2 farmers in Amaro	29 January 2019
During Prosperity Party	Temporary peace offer between the OLF and a Guji regional commander	Warring parties include the Amaro and Gadeo communities with the Guji Oromo that get assistance from the OLF. OLF often collaborates with the federal troops or the Oromo Special Force (OSF)	January 2021
During Prosperity Party	Deadly attack on Amaro-Guji communal leaders	6 people killed during communal leaders meeting in Gelana woreda	18 March 2021
During Prosperity Party	Instigation of violence by the Guji Oromo militias	Violence continued despite peace offering between OLF and a Guji regional commander	2021
During Prosperity Party	Aggression of the OLF-Shene	OLF-Shene claimed control of some territory in Guji	2021
During Prosperity Party	Armed group opened fire during a reconciliation meeting at Gelana, Amaro zone	8 killed, 4 injured. OLF-Shene gunmen reported as suspect	9 March 2021
During Prosperity Party	Attack on Amaro	2 farmers killed in the Kore Kebele, in the Amaro Zone by an armed group	29 March 2021
During Prosperity Party	Attack on Amaro	1 farmer injured while he was asleep in the Gamule Kebele, in the Amaro Zone by an armed group	30 March 2021
During Prosperity Party	Attack on Amaro	1 farmer killed in the Kejalo Kebele in Amaro Zone by armed group	31 March 2021
During Prosperity Party	Attack in the conflict areas	11 people killed by militia group from Gelana and Suro Berguda Woreda of West Guji Zone	5-30 March 2021
During Prosperity Party	Clash between the Koore and other militias	5 killed, 15 injured. Armed clashes between the Koore militas members and the ENDF government forces with Derashe ethnic militias in Holte kebele in Derashe special woreda, and Buniti, Abulo, and Alfacho kebeles in the Amaro zone	June 2022
During Prosperity Party	OLF-Shene attacked Amaro	3 Amaro farmers killed, 2 injured, and livestock stolen from 12 farmers	6 July 2022

== See also ==
- Ethnic violence in Konso
- Human rights in Ethiopia
- Democratic backsliding in Ethiopia
- Gambela massacre
