= Uraga (Aanaa) =

District located in Oromia state of Ethiopia

Coordinates: 6°10′N 38°35′E

Uraga Uraaga (Oromo)
- District
- Location within Ethiopia
- Country: Ethiopia
- Region: (Oromia Region) Oromia
- Zone: Guji Zone
- Time zone: UTC+3 (EAT)

Uraga is one of the Aanaas in the Oromia of Ethiopia. Part of the Guji Zone, Uraga is bordered on the south by Odo Shakiso, on the west by the Borena Zone, on the north by the Southern Nations, Nationalities, and Peoples Region, and on the east by Bore. The largest town in Uraga is Haro Wachu. Dama and Hambela Wamena woredas were separated from Uraga.

== Overview ==
The four major crops grown in this woreda are maize, wheat, barley and navy beans in that order, with some long cycle sorghum and teff as well; in some parts ensete or the false banana is also grown, which offers a degree of security during famines. Coffee is an important cash crop; over 50 square kilometers are planted with it. On 11 January 2007, the woreda government announced the completion of a construction project, which included building 17 primary schools, 3 human health posts, 3 agricultural training centers, and 113 kilometers of road connecting the rural kebeles with Harowachu.

Uraga was one of four woredas that suffered from a wildfire that was started 10 February 2000 and was not brought under control until 7 April, after it had burned a total of 700 square kilometers.

This woreda was part of the Borena Zone until it, along with four other woredas, were split off in September 2003 to create the Guji Zone.

== Demographics ==
The 2007 national census reported a total population for this woreda of 176,238, of whom 88,357 were men and 87,881 were women; 7,646 or 4.34% of its population were urban dwellers. The majority of the inhabitants said they were Protestant, with 70.64% of the population reporting they observed this belief, while 13.05% of the population practiced traditional beliefs, 6.11% were Catholic, 4.46% practised Ethiopian Orthodox Christianity, and 2.32% were Muslim.

Based on figures published by the Central Statistical Agency in 2005, this woreda has an estimated total population of 235,833, of whom 118,352 are men and 117,481 are women; 6,711 or 2.85% of its population are urban dwellers, which is less than the Zone average of 11.6%. With an estimated area of 1,550.47 square kilometers, Uraga has an estimated population density of 152.1 people per square kilometer, which is greater than the Zone average of 21.1.

The 1994 national census reported a total population for this woreda of 170,518, of whom 85,417 were men and 85,101 women; 3,753 or 2.2% of its population were urban dwellers at the time. The three largest ethnic groups reported in Uraga were the Oromo (74.5%), the Gedeo (23.26%), and the Amhara (1.49%); all other ethnic groups made up 0.75% of the population. Oromiffa was spoken as a first language by 75.16%, 22.89% spoke Gedeo, and 1.61% spoke Amharic; the remaining 0.34% spoke all other primary languages reported. The plurality of the inhabitants were Protestant, with 43.9% of the population having reported they practiced that belief, while 23.41% of the population said they practiced traditional beliefs, 9.6% professed Ethiopian Orthodox Christianity, 7.99% were Catholic, and 1.84% were Muslim.
