= West Guji Zone =

Zone of Oromia Region, Ethiopia

Map of the regions and zones of Ethiopia. West Guji is located in the Oromia Region.

West Guji is one of the zones of the Oromia Region of Ethiopia. Located in southern Oromia, West Guji is bordered on the south by Borena, on the west by the South Ethiopia Regional State, on the north by the Gedeo Zone of South Ethiopia and Sidama Region and on the east by the Guji Zone. Its administrative center is Bule Hora.

The West Guji Zone was created by nine districts and two towns taken from the Borena Zone and Guji Zone.

== Demographics ==
Based on the 2007 Census conducted by the Central Statistical Agency of Ethiopia, this Zone has a total population of 1,424,267 of whom 105,443 are Urban residents.

== Conflicts ==
According to United Nations Office for the Coordination of Humanitarian Affairs (OCHA) in 2018: "Close to one million people are believed to be displaced around Gedeo and West Guji Zones."

== See also ==
- Human rights in Ethiopia
- Gedeo–Guji clashes
- Ethnic violence against Amaro Koore
