= Ethnic violence in Konso =

Violence involved ethnic groups in Konso, SNNPR, Ethiopia

- Part of the conflicts in the Horn of Africa and Ethiopian civil conflict (2018–present)
- Konso (Ethiopia)
- Duration: 1994— present
- Location: Konso, Ethiopia; 5.3404°N 37.4388°E
- Type: Ethnic violence: Civilians and farmers killed and injured; 1 million+ displaced; Hundreds of IDPs; Homes burned down
- Theme: Ongoing ethnic violence
- Cause: Land drawn along ethnic lines (Ethnic Federalism)
- Motive: Dispute over administrative land, leadership and territory
- Participants: Various militants from (Southern Nations, Nationalities, and Peoples' Region) and regions
- Deaths: Ongoing. 83+ killed; 57+ injured

The conflict in Konso is part of a series of ethnic-based violence in Ethiopia. UN OCHA reported that its Early warning department of SNNPR categorized Konso as a priority hot spot area. Repeated conflict and the issue of adverse weather exacerbated the existing humanitarian crisis in the Zone. Interpersonal ethnic violence are deepening into serious human rights violations and suffering, with the ethnic federalism system that drew formal administrative divisions with regional boundaries falling along ethnic lines.

== Background and events of the Konso conflict ==
This is the background for some southern ethnic habitation since the 1990s and the timeline of the Konso conflict.

Period	Event and land administration	Description	Date
Pre-1994	Independent Woredas	Amaro, Burji, Derashe, Konso, and Alle	Prior to the 1994 ethnic federalism
During and pre-EPRDF	Special Woreda with Semi-autonomous administrative setup	Amaro, Burji, Derashe, and Konso. Special Woredas directly report to SNNR (not to Zone)	During and pre-EPRDF
During and pre-EPRDF	Minorities in Konso and Derashe Special Woredas	Alle (also known as Dhobasse in Derashe, or Gewada in Konso)	During and pre-ERDF
During and pre-EPRDF	Residents of the Derashe Special Woreda	Dirasha, Mossiye, Masholle and Kussume, and the Alle (Dhobasse) as minority	During and pre-EPRDF
During and pre-EPRDF	Residents of the Konso Special Woreda	Majority Konso, and Gewada (Alle) as minority	During and pre-EPRDF
During and pre-EPRDF	Residents of the Amaro Special Woreda	the Kore ethnic group	During and pre-EPRDF
During and pre-EPRDF	Residents of the Burji Special Woreda	the Burji ethnic group	post-1994
During EPRDF with ethnic federalism	Alle minority sought independence	The Alle minority wanted to pursue its own Special Woreda	post-1994
During EPRDF	Start of dispute with removal of Special Woredas as a temporary solution	Formation of Segan Area People's Zone by the ruling SNNPR and the regional party, SEPDM	28 March 2011
During EPRDF	The Segan Area Zone incorporated various ethnic groups from various Woredas, including Alle	Alle, Burji, Dirasha, Konso (Xonsita), Kore, Kusumie, Mashole and Moseye, and others (Oromo, Welayta, Amhara, Gurage)	post-1994
During EPRDF	Konso protest and imprisonment	Resistance by the Konso population and movement to establish Konso Zone. Other issues: dispute over a decision to keep Gumade as Zone capital city City of Segan's (Gumade) versus the Konsos’ city (Karat)	2016
post-EPRDF	Release of the Konso prisoners	Abiy Ahmed announced the release of political prisoners in Ethiopia	2018
post-EPRDF	Dissociation from the Segan Zone	Konso and Ale's groups split from Segan Zone	November 2018
post-EPRDF	Konso became an independent Zone	Violence triggered due to administrative border and leadership disputes. 66 people killed in 17 Kebeles. 39 people injured with more than 130,000 IDPs, and 137 people arrested.	2018 to November 2020
During Prosperity Party ruling	Attack in Segan town of Konso	Unidentified militants reportedly attacked a restaurant. 3 people killed and 5 injured	August 2021
During Prosperity Party ruling	Intercommunal violence in SNNPR	70,000 IDPs in Konso	2020 to 2021
During Prosperity Party ruling	Killings with disputed agricultural land	Unidentified militia clashed with Konso ethnic militia & SNNPR special forces in Dimaya, Konso Zone resulted in unknown number of fatalities. Dimaya is border between Alle and Konso special Woredas	26 March 2022
During Prosperity Party ruling	Segan's revenue officer shot and killed	Unidentified militia killed 1 officer while eating dinner at a restaurant	26 March 2022
During Prosperity Party ruling	Segan's revenue officer shot and killed	Unidentified armed men from Alle killed 9 and injured 13 people in Dimiya, Segen, and Kolme cluster areas in Konso zone. The gun men burned down several homes	27 March 2022
During Prosperity Party ruling	Civilians, and other killed in Segan	Unidentified armed men from Derashe shot and killed 1 Kebele officer, 1 local militia member and 2 civilians	31 March 2022

== See also ==
- Human rights in Ethiopia
- Ethnic violence against Amaro Koore
- Democratic backsliding in Ethiopia
- Gambela massacre
