= Ana Sora =

- District
- Location within Ethiopia
- Coordinates: 6°15′N 38°50′E
- Country: Ethiopia

Ana Sora is a district of Oromia Region in Ethiopia.

== See also ==
- Districts of Ethiopia
