= Lega Dembi Mine =

Gold mine in Oromia Region, Ethiopia

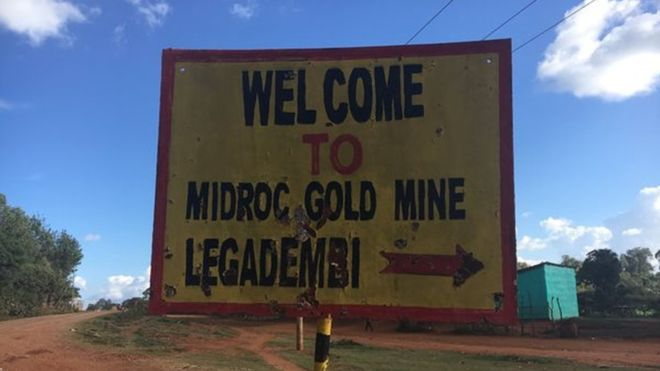
- Entrance sign, 2002

- Location within Ethiopia
- Location: near Shakiso, Oromia, Oromia; 5°42′55″N 38°53′32″E
- Products: Gold and silver
- Active: 1930s to present
- Company: MIDROC

The Lega Dembi Mine is the largest gold mine in Ethiopia and is near Shakiso in Oromia Region. Lega Dembi has a yearly production of around 4,500 kg of gold and silver, and is owned by MIDROC. Pollution from the mine has resulted in environmental conflict that has exacerbated other political and ethnic conflict in the region.

The mine has exposed thousands of people to cyanide, arsenic and mercury pollution greatly exceeding World Health Organization guidelines, causing severe negative health effects including many stillbirths, birth defects, and deformities. In the 2022 United Nations Special Rapporteur for Human Rights and the Environment, David Richard Boyd described the mine as one of the worst sacrifice zones in the world. The mine's pollution has also threatened local communities' food security. People have been killed for organising protests against the mine, and in 2018 at least five people were killed when security forces fired at demonstrators. These protests resulted in temporary cancellation of the mining permit.

in February 2021, The Ministry of Mines, Petroleum and Natural Gas (MoMPNG) announced that it would allow MIDROC to reopen the mine. A report in 2022 found that the government had "largely succeeded in suppressing any public expression of opposition to the mine."

== Background ==
Lega Dembi mine is located in Oromia Regional State, Guji Zone, about 500 km south of Addis Ababa.

Lega Dembi is part of the Adola gold deposit, and was discovered in the 1930s. The mine was developed by the Ethiopian empire with forced labor and penal servitude. At this time, a garrison of 900 soldiers provided security for the mine; displaced locals were killed or tortured for artisanal mining in the area or for collecting coffee near the mine.

The mine was privatised in 1997, and as of 2011 is owned by MIDROC, a company owned by Ethiopian-Saudi billionaire Mohammed Hussein Al Amoudi. MIDROC is Ethiopia's sole gold exporter.

Environmental conflict in Ethiopia contributes to political instability and ethnic violence in the country. A 2022 study published by The Extractive Industries and Society found that exploitation of the area replicated a pattern in which successive Ethiopian regimes have justified land appropriation for resource extraction with narratives about civilising 'backward' societies.

== Production ==
MIDROC Technology Group acquired the mine from the Ethiopian government for $172 million in 1997. The mine was initially an open-pit mine and produced gold and silver beginning in 1998, and had a large open tailings pond. MIDROC expanded and converted it into an underground mine.

The mine produced four tons of gold per year and generated more than $60 million/year before the permit was cancelled in 2018.

A ten-year renewal for the mining permit was briefly granted in 2018, with a provision allocating 2 percent of the mine's profit for the local community, but it was quickly cancelled due to local outrage about pollution from the mine, before being reinstated in 2021.

== Impact ==
Between 1997 and 2009, MIDROC's expansion of the mine caused deforestation and displaced Indigenous Gujii people from their ancestral land, denying their right to free, prior and informed consent. Local community members have reported that mine security shoots at people if they get near the mine, and that employment opportunities have systematically excluded local people.

Local people allege that MIDROC polluted rivers with chemicals that residents used for drinking and for livestock, causing birth deformities and animal deaths. Protesters contend water and air pollution from the mine have caused respiratory illnesses, miscarriages, birth defects, and disabilities. Other reports include tumours, headaches, skin conditions, and vision problems. One healthcare provider reported that, "Mothers are having miscarriages every single day...I am not seeing this in other places, only around the mining site." A field study in 2018-2019 found 19 children with "serious deformities and paralysis" in a survey of 36 households.

The Convention on the Elimination of All Forms of Discrimination Against Women (CEDAW) determined that local people's right to food has also been impaired because their livestock have died, their crops have been reduced, and the food is contaminated. Children's right to education has also been affected, because children have deformities that make them unable to walk to school or developmental disabilities that local schools lack resources to address.

Following protests in 2018, the Ministry of Mines, Petroleum and Natural Gas (MoMPNG) agreed to do an environmental impact statement for the mine. No previous environmental study had been made public. The Canadian embassy agreed to fund the study.

A 2022 paper found that MIROC had created a resource enclave at Lega Dembi that was distanced from influence by the local community.

== Protests ==
In 2009, people protested the mine in response to the death of hundreds of cattle. They were beaten and arrested en masse.

In 2015, protests at the mine became part of larger anti-government demonstrations that culminated in the 2018 resignation of Prime Minister Hailemariam Desalegn. The demonstrations left hundreds dead.

In April 2016, security forces killed a protest organiser. A 2016 report by Human Rights Watch found that, "Security forces committed numerous human rights violations in response to the protests, including arbitrary arrest and detention, killings and other uses of excessive force, torture and ill-treatment in detention, and enforced disappearances."

In April and May 2018, demonstrators blocked roads in Shakiso demanding the cancellation of MIDROC's licence at Lega Dembi. The protests spread to other towns as well. Protestors cut power and water supply to the mine. Security forces shot at demonstrators, killing five people on May 8 and 9. A local politician was arrested for speaking to the media about the protests.

The Ministry of Mines, Petroleum and Natural Gas (MoMPNG) temporarily suspended MIDROC's mining permit following the 2018 protests.

in February 2021, MoMPNG announced that it would allow MIDROC to reopen the mine. A report in 2022 found that the government had "largely succeeded in suppressing any public expression of opposition to the mine."

== See also ==
- List of gold mines
