= Elias Kifle =

Ethiopian publisher and editor-in-chief of the news journal Ethiopian Review

Elias Kifle (Amharic: ኤልያስ ክፍሌ) is the publisher and editor-in-chief of the Washington D.C.–based Ethiopian Review, an English/Amharic language Ethiopian news magazine that was launched in January 1991. He is currently the CEO of Mereja TV, a satellite television channel, and Mereja.com, an online news and opinion journal. Elias Kifle Seifu is a member of the Lij Seifu Mikael family, an Amhara aristocratic family from the ancient Solomonic Dynasty.

== Libel ==
In December 2010 Mohammed Hussein Ali Al Amoudi initiated a claim in the English High Court against Elias Kifle claiming damages for libel. In July 2011 Kifle was ordered to pay £175,000 in damages for publishing that Al Amoudi had hunted his daughter down so she could be stoned to death.

In 2012, Kifle was charged in absentia of treason.
