= Oromia Supreme Court =

Ethiopian Federal Supreme Court department in Oromia Region

Coordinates: 9.04436319072524°N 8.763870707935645°E

The Oromia Supreme Court is the Ethiopian Federal Supreme Court department based in Oromia Region. Under Proclamation No 46/2001, Article 65(1–2), the Supreme Court alongside other regional counterparts should obligated to the Federal and regional government of Ethiopia, and judges can be appointed by the Regional Judicial Commission and the nominees submitted to Regional Council for appointment by the President of the Supreme Court.

The most problematic issues during judges nomination in this Supreme Court has been identified with the judge interrelation with legislative and executive organs that has been political affiliated, while the judiciary completely must remain independent to government subjects. Its office is located in Addis Ababa.

== Overview ==
The Oromia Regional State Revisited Constitution Proclamation No 46/2001, Article 65(1–2) provides that:

- The President nominates of regional government and Vice President of Supreme Court submit to the Regional Council for appointment.
- The election of judges in all courts shall be performed in candidate of the Regional Judicial Commission and the nominees submitted to Regional Council for appointment by the president of Supreme Court.

Judges nominated on the grounds of the following criteria under Article 5 (a-h). In addition, Proclamation No. 54/2002 also reinforce the consideration of Judicial Administration Commission of the Oromia Regional State under Article 13(1–2):

- Loyalty to federal and regional government
- Legal proficiency
- Good reputation and conduct
- Language fluency of the region
- Not convicted by the court of law
- Not serving to legislative and executive branch of government or other political affiliation while under judgeship

However, "lack of transparency" is practically the main problem in judicial selection, and has become a controversial issues to present the trained candidate for loyal assertion to judicial commission. The other problem is the interrelations of judges to legislative and executive organ affiliated with political organization, while every judicial organs must remain independent, despite the 2002 Proclamation somewhere secured its independent.

== Criticism ==
On 21 July 2022, the Oromia Supreme Court preside over the case of 17 defendants, two Oromo News Network (ONN) journalists named Bikila Amenu and Dessu Dulla, who were detained in November 2021 and again in May 2022. A defense team criticized the action of Oromia Supreme Court as "contradicting its own charge amendments", citing the Article 258/A of the Criminal Code that stipulates about death penalty.
