= MIDROC =

Ethiopian oil and mining company

Mohammed International Development Research and Organization Companies
- Native name: ሚድሮክ
- Type: Private
- Industry: investment group
- Founded: 1994; 32 years ago
- Founder: Sheikh Mohammed Hussein Al Amoudi
- Headquarters: Addis Ababa, Ethiopia
- Area served: Africa; Europe; Middle East
- Key people: Sheikh Mohammed Hussein Ali Al-Amoudi (Chairman); Akalewold Admassu (Deputy CEO); Kassahun Hailemariam (Deputy CEO)
- Brands: Granitor (in Europe)
- Revenue: 1.3 bn birr (2011)
- Parent: Corral Petroleum Holdings
- Website: www.midrocinvestmentgroup.com/about-us/

Mohammed International Development Research and Organization Companies (MIDROC) is an Ethiopian mining and oil company owned by Ethiopian-born Saudi billionaire Sheikh Mohammed Hussein Al Amoudi. It has operations in Europe, the Middle East, and Africa. Through its Corral Petroleum Holdings AB, MIDROC was a major independent oil company.

The company has perpetrated extreme human rights violations at Lega Dembi gold mine in the Oromia Region of Ethiopia by improper disposal of hazardous waste including mercury, arsenic, and cyanide.

== Operations ==
Midroc has operations across three continents, over 70,000 employees and a turnover of $25 billion. The group is active in various sectors, including industry, venture capital, oil and fuel production, energy and mining.

=== MIDROC Ethiopia ===
MIDROC Ethiopia was established in 1994. In 2011 it made a profit of 1.3bn birr (US$70m).

MIDROC has major gold mining interests in Ethiopia and it is reported that MIDROC Gold Mine (a subsidiary of MIDROC Ethiopia) has paid the Ethiopian Government 100.1 million birr in royalties, the largest contribution of any mining company. Midroc Gold is Ethiopia's sole gold exporter. Its Lega Dembi Mine has a yearly average production of around 4,500 kg of gold and silver.

==== Human rights violations ====
Between 1997 and 2009, MIDROC's expansion of the mine caused deforestation and displaced Indigenous Gujii people from their ancestral land, denying their right to free, prior and informed consent. Locals have reported that mine security shoots at people if they get near the mine, and that employment opportunities have systematically excluded local people.

Local people allege that Midroc dumped chemicals into rivers that residents used for drinking and for livestock, causing birth deformities and animal deaths. Protesters contend water and air pollution from the mine have caused respiratory illnesses, miscarriages, birth defects, and disabilities. Other reports include tumors, headaches, skin conditions, and vision problems. One healthcare provider reported that, "Mothers are having miscarriages every single day...I am not seeing this in other places, only around the mining site." A field study in 2018-2019 found 19 children with "serious deformities and paralysis" in a survey of 36 households.

Protests against the mine have been brutally repressed with mass arrests, killings, and disappearances. A 2016 report by Human Rights Watch found that, "Security forces committed numerous human rights violations in response to the protests, including arbitrary arrest and detention, killings and other uses of excessive force, torture and ill-treatment in detention, and enforced disappearances."

==== Other projects ====
MIDROC owns 70% of National Oil Ethiopia, which competes with YBF, TAF and five other companies in the national petrol market and is establishing a major steel plant (Tossa) in Amhara. The latter is Ethiopia's first industrial steel production plant and is intended to meet a major increase in domestic demand, estimated to rise from 1.2m tonnes to 3.1m tonnes per annum between 2011 and 2014.

In August 2008, MIDROC opened a small cement factory on the outskirts of the town, which produces 4,000 quintals of cement per day. Some of the output of this factory was used in the construction of the larger Derba MIDROC Cement Factory, which is located 70 kilometers north of Addis Ababa and is the largest cement factory in Ethiopia. North Holdings Investment announced 17 October 2009 that it had completed a feasibility study for its own cement factory at Dejen, which would be built on 450 hectares of land. Construction of the factory will cost around US$1.6 billion, and once completed it would have a production capacity of nine million tons a year.

MIDROC also built the Sheraton Addis hotel.

=== Midroc Europe ===
Midroc Europe was a privately owned corporate group based in Sweden active in the properties, construction, industry and environmental technology sectors. In January 2022, the Midroc Group, which included Midroc Europe, became Granitor. In July 2024, MIDROC retain its name to Granitor in Sweden due to Wikström family's increased holdings.

=== Midroc Middle East ===
Midroc Middle East is a privately owned corporate group active in the engineering and construction and the industrial sectors.

- ABV Rock Group Ltd
- EG&G Middle East
- Saudi ABV
- Yanbu Steel
- Metals Services
- Trans Desert Transport
- Golden Leaves
