= Boorana =

Subgroup of Oromo people

Borana
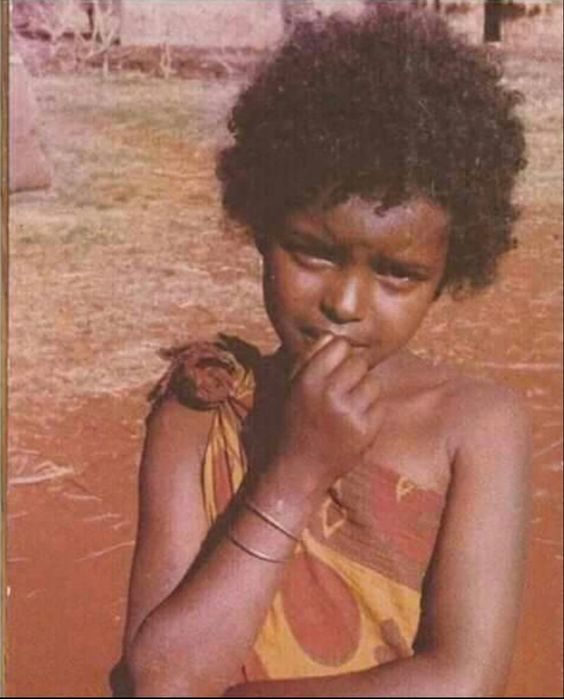
- Borana Oromo Child from Ethiopia (1960)

Regions with significant populations
- 874,000 Ethiopia, 276,236 Kenya

Languages
- Oromo

Religion
- Majority Sunni Islam with minorities of Christianity and Waaqeffanna

Related ethnic groups
- Barento Oromo

The Boorana (also known as Borana) are one of the two major subgroups of the Oromo people. A Cushitic ethnic group, they primarily inhabit the Borena Zone of the Oromia Region of Ethiopia and the former Eastern Province in northern Kenya, specifically Marsabit County. They speak a distinct dialect of the Oromo language by the same name, Boorana. The Boorana people are notable for practicing the Gadaa system without interruption.

== Demography and language ==
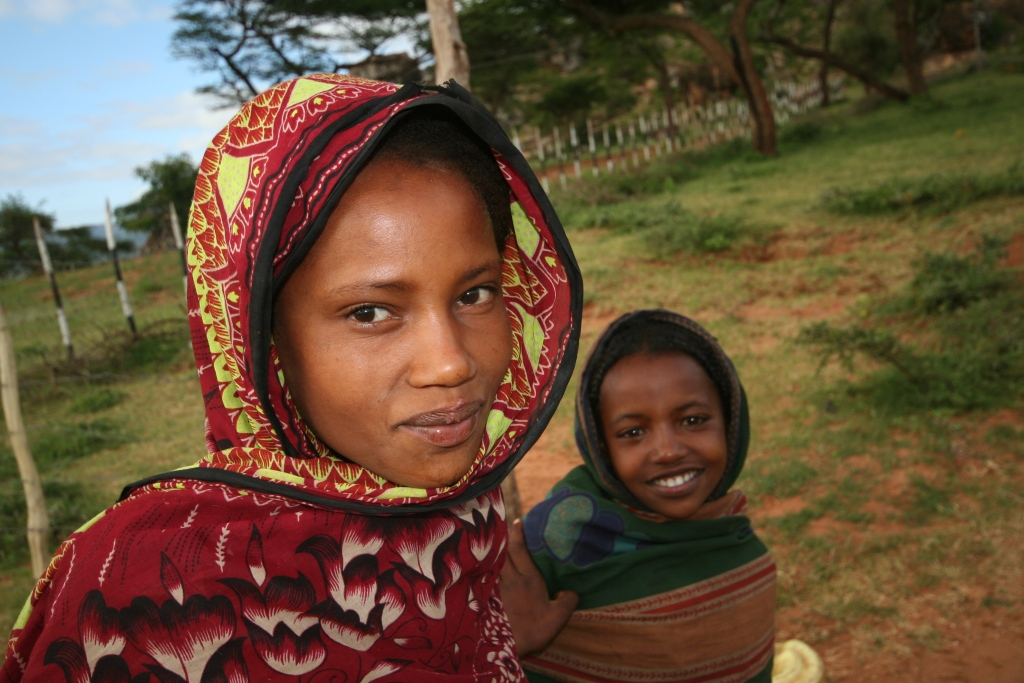
Borana children near the town of Yabelo in Borena Zone, Ethiopia

Through the Gadha system, the Boranas are believed to have conquered and protected their territories until the second world war when they were overpowered by colonial policies. Since they were semi-nomadic, their population growth did not match that of their neighbors both in Kenya and Ethiopia, which put them at risk of losing much of their territory. Today, they make up the majority of the population in Moyale and the surrounding region.

For generations, Borana men have extracted salt from the crater Chew Bet, an extinct volcano located in southern Ethiopia. The salt is extracted using traditional methods and is sold in the surrounding region, where it is a valued commodity.

Those in Kenya and Ethiopia speak the Borana language that is closely related to the Oromo, which is part of the Cushitic branch of the large Afro-Asiatic language family. In the border regions of Ethiopia-Kenya and southwestern Somalia, one estimate places about 1,094,000 people as Boranas. Another estimate in 2019 suggests 874,000 Boranas in Ethiopia, 210,000 in Kenya and 10,000 in Somalia.

== Society ==
=== Borana Gadaa system ===
The Borana have had their own form of government system for the last 568 years, recognized by UNESCO as a heritage that needs to be protected. The system covers political, social, economic and spiritual ways of life.

Politically, it has a system of government where the overall leader is God himself and many unknown things are referred as 'Waaqaa Beekaa', a sentence that can be equated to a Supreme Being knows. The second in command who is also the supreme leader of the whole Borana community is referred to as Abba Gadaa. The Abba Gadaa is the person in charge of all affairs of the Borana community and answerable to the Gumi Gayo (parliament).

Abba Gadaa is anointed at an early age of 1–8 years. The Abba Gadaa and others of his age pass through an education system that will last for forty years after which he will take over the leadership as Abba Gadaa. He and his team will vote from 17 sub-clans of Borana, one parliament member from each sub-clan. The parliament, called Gumi Gayo, functions just like a present-day senate with the same roles.

=== Economy ===
Economically, from time immemorial until the present, the Borana have passed laws in the Gumi Gayo covering Borana's traditional land and natural resources. Since Boranas were mixed farmers rearing cattle, camels, and goats, and planting food crops; farming land, grazing land, and water sources, their traditional boundaries were paramount to them, and in many cases, fights broke out between Borana and their neighbors, who took advantage of Borana kindness and forcefully reared their animals in Borana grazing land and took over some of the Borana water sources, traditionally called Tula Saglan. Presently, the Borana boundaries have been infiltrated by the three governments surrounding Borana territory; these include Ethiopia, Kenya, and Somalia.

Due to this, the Borana have lost much of their top grazing land, far from their central area where they used to take their animals during the drought. They are economically affected and politically caught between these colonial governments and many struggles between them. As of today, the nine wells of Borana (Tulla Saglan), traditional settlements, and their traditional grazing land are scattered across these colonial boundaries, and others are inaccessible to the larger Boranas.

Socially, Boranas was known to be very kind people, especially to the visitors, a weakness that all these three colonial governments used to strip off most of their ancestral heritages, not limited to land, water sources, natural resources, and top grazing areas. Boranas harmoniously lived with their neighbors by sharing and helping during hard times like prolonged drought seasons, till colonial powers set in and instigated colonial wars and redrew the African territories into colonial boundaries.

=== Religion ===
Spiritually, Boranas believe that there is a supreme Being in charge of their worldly affairs and upper dominion, they believe that there is a creator called Waaq. Many Borana people prefer to be Muslims rather than Christians since the religion of Islam concurs in many ways with their tradition. Years ago Boranas became Muslims, three time of three consecutive Abagadhas and goes back to fully to their tradition three consecutive Abagadhas after this. Since then their system remains full tradition. But still, there are Boranas who are Muslims and others who are Christians as well and they all value their system as an asset.

Spiritually, Boranas have a supreme spiritual leader known as Fite Qalu. Besides being a supreme spirituality in charge of prayer in all Borana gatherings, including the Borana parliament, he is also in charge of administration, who appoints other Qalu, putting them in charge of smaller administration units, which can be equated to a present state president, a Qalu who in turn appoints other smaller administrators in his jurisdiction called Jalab (governor) who are respectively in charge of smaller administration, meaning one Qalu is in charge of many Jalab under his state. Accordingly, the Jalab appoints Qae (village) in charge of villages under him. Qae is answerable to Jalab, Jalab is answerable to Qalu, and Qalu is answerable to Fite Qalu. Only Fite Qalu and Qalu have an authority to make a prayer in all gatherings, Jalab and Qae are deprived of that role. No Borana gatherings are recognized without the presence of either Fite Qalu or Qalu who opens the gatherings with a prayer.

The Boranas also have special warriors that defend the community from any enemies. They are in the last age to the Gadaa stage and are in one part of stages of the Borana system. Only those between 32–40 years are allowed to be part of this special Borana Defense Force. They are all in an immediate stage to the Gadaa stage called Dori. They serve their community for eight years and meet three times in those years. The first meeting takes place before they depart to different regions of Borana for community protection. The second meeting is after four years. And they meet a last time, again, at the end of their eight years making a ceremony of giving the roles and power of protection to other upcoming members of that age of Dori who were in Raba before. Their time cuts across two consecutive supreme leaders and they serve and take instructions from both.

== History ==
After a second Ethiopian mission of conquest numbering 15,000 soldiers, the Borana were forced to submit to Fitawrari Habte Giyorgis on July 31, 1897, succumbing to settler colonialism under the Neftenya-led Gabbar system and territorial loss on all sides in future decades.

== See also ==
- Oromia
- Borena Zone
- Oromo people
