= Borena Zone =

Zone in Oromia Region of Ethiopia

Coordinates: 5°00′N 38°15′E

A map of the regions and zones of Ethiopia

Borena (Oromo: Boorana) is a zone in Oromia Region of Ethiopia. Borena is named after one of the two major subgroups of the Oromo people. Borena is bordered on the south by Kenya, on the west by the Southern Nations, Nationalities, and Peoples Region, on the north by West Guji and Guji, and on the east by Dawa Zone Somali Region. The highest point in this zone is Mount Dara Tiniro. Cities and major towns in this Zone include Negele Borana, Moyale, Yabelo, Dubuluk, Mega, Millami, Surupa and Bakke.

== History ==
The Borena Zone was created shortly after the adoption of the 1995 Constitution of Ethiopia and the creation of the Oromia Region. In September 2003, the upland woredas were separated from Borena to create the Guji Zone. Since then many of the remaining woredas have been reorganized to create new ones.

This Zone was selected by the Ministry of Agriculture and Rural Development in 2004 as one of several areas for voluntary resettlement for farmers from overpopulated areas; no specific woredas were identified in this program. Borena became the new home for a total of 9145 heads of households and 45,725 total family members.

Drought conditions in Borana in 2006 have increased tensions between the Borana and Guji clans from 22 May, and spiraled into violence a week later. Clan elders were able to restore peace, but only after 10 days of fighting in which between 100 and 150 people were killed and left thousands displaced.

Borena National Park covers much of Borena Zone. The park was created in 2017 from the former Borena Controlled Hunting Area.

== Demographics ==
Based on the 2007 Census conducted by the Central Statistical Agency of Ethiopia (CSA), this Zone has a total population of 962,489, of whom 487,024 are men and 475,465 women; with an area of 45,434.97 square kilometers, Borena has a population density of 21.18. A total of 182,258 households were counted in this Zone, which results in an average of 5.28 persons to a household, and 174,474 housing units. The three largest ethnic groups reported were the Oromo (88.78%), the Gedeo (4.42%) and the Burji (3.17%); all other ethnic groups made up 3.63% of the population. Oromo was spoken as a first language by 90.94%, Gedeo was spoken by 4.06% and Konso by 2.72%; the remaining 2.28% spoke all other primary languages reported. The majority of the inhabitants were Protestant, with 47.25% of the population having reported they practiced that belief, while 35.01% of the population practiced traditional beliefs, 9.62% were Muslim and 5.45% professed Ethiopian Orthodox Christianity.

The 1994 national census reported a total population for this Zone of 1,398,543 in 275,072 households, of whom 711,344 were men and 687,199 women; 127,469 or 9.11% of its population were urban dwellers at the time. (This total also includes an estimate for the inhabitants of 10 rural kebeles and parts of two urban ones, which were not counted; they were estimated to have 31,670 inhabitants, of whom 16,465 were men and 15,205 were women.) The four largest ethnic groups reported in Borena were the Oromo (76.56%), the Gedeo (12.87%), the Amhara (3.28%), and the Somali (3.21%); all other ethnic groups made up 4.08% of the population. Oromiffa was spoken as a first language by 77.08%, 12.59% Gedeo, 5.05% spoke Amharic, and 3.22% spoke Somali; the remaining 2.06% spoke all other primary languages reported. The plurality of the inhabitants were Protestant, with 32.17% of the population having reported they practiced that belief, while 27.01% held traditional beliefs, 14.21% were Muslim, 11.28% professed Ethiopian Orthodox Christianity, and 1.15% were Catholic.

According to a May 24, 2004 World Bank memorandum, 4% of the inhabitants of Borena have access to electricity, this zone has a road density of 27.5 kilometers per 1000 square kilometers (compared to the national average of 30 kilometers), the average rural household has 0.5 hectare of land (compared to the national average of 1.01 hectare of land and an average of 1.14 for the Oromia Region) and the equivalent of 0.6 heads of livestock. 14.4% of the population is in non-farm related jobs, compared to the national average of 25% and a Regional average of 24%. Concerning education, 53% of all eligible children are enrolled in primary school, and 9% in secondary schools. Concerning health, 35% of the zone is exposed to malaria, and none to Tsetse fly. The memorandum gave this zone a drought risk rating of 410.

== Economy ==
The CSA reported that 13,533 tons of coffee were produced in this zone in the year ending in 2005, based on inspection records from the Ethiopian Coffee and Tea authority. This represents 11.8% of the Region's output and 6.0% of Ethiopia's total output. Borena is home to three of the major mines of Ethiopia: the gold mine at Kebri Mangest, and the Lega Dembi gold and the Kenticha tantalum mines near Shakiso. An agreement was signed in early December 1997 between the Ethiopian government and the private company JCI Ethiopia for the exploration of gold, base and associated minerals in Borena. The exclusive exploration rights would cover the next three years while the company's estimated spending during this period will be 10 million dollars.
