= Gujii =

Oromo clan in southern Oromia, Ethiopia

The Guji Oromo are an Oromo clan living Guji Zone in southern Oromia of Ethiopia. They are distinguished by their agro-pastoral lifestyle. According to a population projection from 2007, the total population of the Guji Oromo is above 5 million. The Guji have lived in their territory for many centuries. They claim that their cradle land is Girja.

The Guji live in a fertile and natural resource-rich region in Ethiopia: the Guji Zone in the Oromia Region, which is named for them. The known gold mining area of Adola, the dense natural forest of Bada Magada, the Nechisar National Park and Shakiso-Adola evergreen forests are the natural areas which have been conserved by the Guji Oromo.

Guji people is also well known by preserving and promoting the Gadaa system. The Gadaa system is a traditional socio-political, economic, and cultural system practiced by the Guji people of Oromia, Ethiopia. It is an indigenous democratic system used to govern society, manage conflicts, and organize leadership.

Dawa Guji's picture

== Language ==
The Guji speak an Oromo dialect of the Southern Oromo variety.

== Religion ==
In the Guji Zone where most Gujis are found, there are three major religions: original Oromo religion (Waaqa), Islam and Christianity. However, according to the 2007 Census conducted by the Central Statistical Agency of Ethiopia (CSA), 60% of the population said they were Protestant Christianity, and 2.11% said they practised Orthodox Christianity. The remaining practiced cultural religion and Islam.

== History ==
The Guji were conquered in 1897 during Menelik II's conquests, thereafter succumbing to settler colonialism. Most of their land was taken from them under the Neftenya-led Gabbar system, a common pattern among conquered communities across Ethiopia. Since the 20th century, they have steadily been expanding southward at the expense of the Boorana.

== Education ==
The Guji people are known for using a wide variety of proverbs in many social and conversational contexts.

== Sources ==
- Dejene N. Debsu. 2009. Gender and culture in southern Ethiopia: an ethnographic analysis of Guji-Oromo women's customary rights. African Study Monographs 30.1: 15–36.
- Loo, Joseph van and Bilow Kola. 1991. Guji Oromo culture in southern Ethiopia: Religious capabilities in rituals and songs. Berlin: Dietrich Reimer Verlag.
- Taddesse Berisso. 2000. The Riddles of Number Nine in Guji-Oromo Culture. Journal of Ethiopian Studies Volume 33.1: 49–66.
