= Burji language =

Afro-Asiatic language of Ethiopia

Burji
- ቡርጂ (Burji)
- Native to: Ethiopia, Kenya
- Region: South of Lake Chamo
- Ethnicity: Burji people
- Native speakers: 83,000 (2007 & 2019 censuses)
- Language family: Afro-Asiatic: Cushitic; East; Highland East; Burji
- Writing system: Geʽez; Latin

Language codes
- ISO 639-3: bji
- Glottolog: burj1242
- ELP: Burji

Burji language (alternate names: Bembala, Bambala, Daashi) is an Afro-Asiatic language spoken by the Burji people who reside in Ethiopia south of Lake Chamo. There are over 49,000 speakers in Ethiopia, and a further 36,900 speakers in Kenya. Burji belongs to the Highland East Cushitic group of the Cushitic branch of the Afro-Asiatic family.

The language has the SOV (subject–object–verb) word order common to the Cushitic family. The verb morphology distinguishes passive and middle grammatical voice, as well as causative. Verbal suffixes mark the person, number, and gender of the subject.

The New Testament was published in the Burji language in 1993. A collection of Burji proverbs, translated into English, French, and Swahili, is available on the Web.

== Numerals 1-1000 ==
base numeral		+10		× 10	
1	micha	11	tannaya micha	10	tanna
2	lama	12	tannaya lama	20	lamattann
3	fadiya	13	tannaya fadiya	30	fadiitann
4	foola	14	tannaya foola	40	foolattan
5	umutta	15	tannaya umutta	50	umuttan
6	liya	16	tannaya liya	60	liittan
7	lamala	17	tannaya lamala	70	lamalattan
8	hiditta	18	tannaya hiditta	80	hidittan
9	wonfa	19	tannaya wonfa	90	wonfattan
10	tanna	20	lamattann	100	ch'ibba

- 1,000. kuma

== Syntax ==
=== Word order ===
Dhaashatee is a head-final language, which means that modifiers come before the main noun in the noun phrase. Dependent clauses come before independent clauses, while relative clauses come before the nouns they modify. The basic word order at the sentence-level is SOV, as in other HEC languages.

=== Relative clauses ===
Relative clauses in Burji (Dhaashatee) are not formally marked but they can be recognized from main clauses by having more than one completely inflected verb in a non-final position. In contrast, in a "regular" main clause with multiple verbs, all but the last one takes a converb suffix. Other types of subordinate clauses are marked by complementizers or subordinate conjunctions.

An examples of a relative clause is given below. Dhogoli functions as the subject of both the relative clause and the main clause.

Lama lasa eegadh-i dhab-ann-oo dhogol-i aaree-shini gal-i=k'aa akkarraga isheek-koo mar-ann-oo.
two day wait-CVB loose-PST-CON leopard-SNOM.M/ABS anger-INS.F return-CVB=FOC evening POSS.3SG.F-ADE go-PST-CON
'Having lost two days waiting, the leopard returned furiously, and in the evening, he went to her house.'
