= Guji Zone =

Zone in Oromia Region of Ethiopia

Coordinates: 5°40′N 39°0′E

Map of the regions and zones of Ethiopia. NB: This map does not reflect the most recent administrative changes in zones

Guji (Oromo: Godina Gujii) is a zone in Oromia Region of Ethiopia. Guji is named after a tribe of the Oromo people. Guji is bordered on the south by Borena, on the west by the Southern Nations, Nationalities, and Peoples Region, on the north by the Ganale Dorya River which separates it from Bale and on the east by the Somali Region. The highest point in this zone is Mount Dara Tiniro. Cities and major towns in this Zone include its administrative center, Nagele, Shakiso Bore, Adola Woyu.

The Guji Zone was created in September 2002, when the upland woredas of the Borena Zone were split apart to create it.

== Demographics ==
Based on the 2007 Census conducted by the Central Statistical Agency of Ethiopia, this zone has a total population of 1,389,800, of whom 702,580 are men and 687,220 women; with an area of 18,577.05 square kilometers, Guji has a population density of 74.81. While 129,852 or 14.31% are urban inhabitants, a further 5,315 or 0.38% are pastoralists. A total of 269,440 households were counted in this Zone, which results in an average of 5.16 persons to a household, and 258,540 housing units. The four largest ethnic groups reported in Guji were the Oromo (78.57%), the Gedeo (14.33%), the Amhara (2.59%) and the Somali (1.59%); all other ethnic groups made up 2.92% of the population. Oromo was spoken as a first language by 77.91%, 14.16% spoke Gedeo, 4.31% spoke Amharic and 1.61% spoke Somali; the remaining 2.01% spoke all other primary languages reported. The majority of the inhabitants professed Protestantism, with 56.14% of the population having reported they practiced that belief, while 14,8% of the population were Muslim, 11.32% of the population said they held traditional beliefs, 7.49% professed Ethiopian Orthodox Christianity and 2.12% were Catholic.
