= Outline of Ethiopia =

Country in the Horn of Africa

The Flag of Ethiopia

The Emblem of Ethiopia

The location of Ethiopia

Ethiopia is a landlocked sovereign country located in the Horn of Africa. It is bordered by Eritrea to the north, Sudan to the west, South Sudan to the south-west, Kenya to the south, Somalia to the east and Djibouti to the north-east. Ethiopia is one of the oldest countries in the world and Africa's second-most populous nation. Ethiopia has yielded some of humanity's oldest traces, making the area important in the history of human evolution. Recent studies claim that the vicinity of present-day Addis Ababa was the point from which human beings migrated around the world. Ethiopian dynastic history traditionally began with the reign of Emperor Menelik I in 1000 BC. The roots of the Ethiopian state are similarly deep, dating with unbroken continuity to at least the Aksumite Empire (which adopted the name "Ethiopia" in the 4th century) and its predecessor state, D`mt (with early 1st millennium BC roots). After a period of decentralized power in the 18th and early 19th centuries known as the Zemene Mesafint ("Era of the Judges/Princes"), the country was reunited in 1855 by Kassa Hailu, who became Emperor Tewodros II, beginning Ethiopia's modern history. Ethiopia's borders underwent significant territorial expansion to its modern borders for the rest of the century, especially by Emperor Menelik II and Ras Gobena, culminating in its victory over the Italians at the Battle of Adwa in 1896 with the military leadership of Ras Makonnen, and ensuring its sovereignty and freedom from colonization. It was occupied by Benito Mussolini's Fascist Italy from 1936 to 1941, ending with its liberation by British Empire and Ethiopian Patriot forces. Its eastern border also changed in 1950 from the former 1908 Convention Line to the subsequent provisional administrative line.

== General reference ==
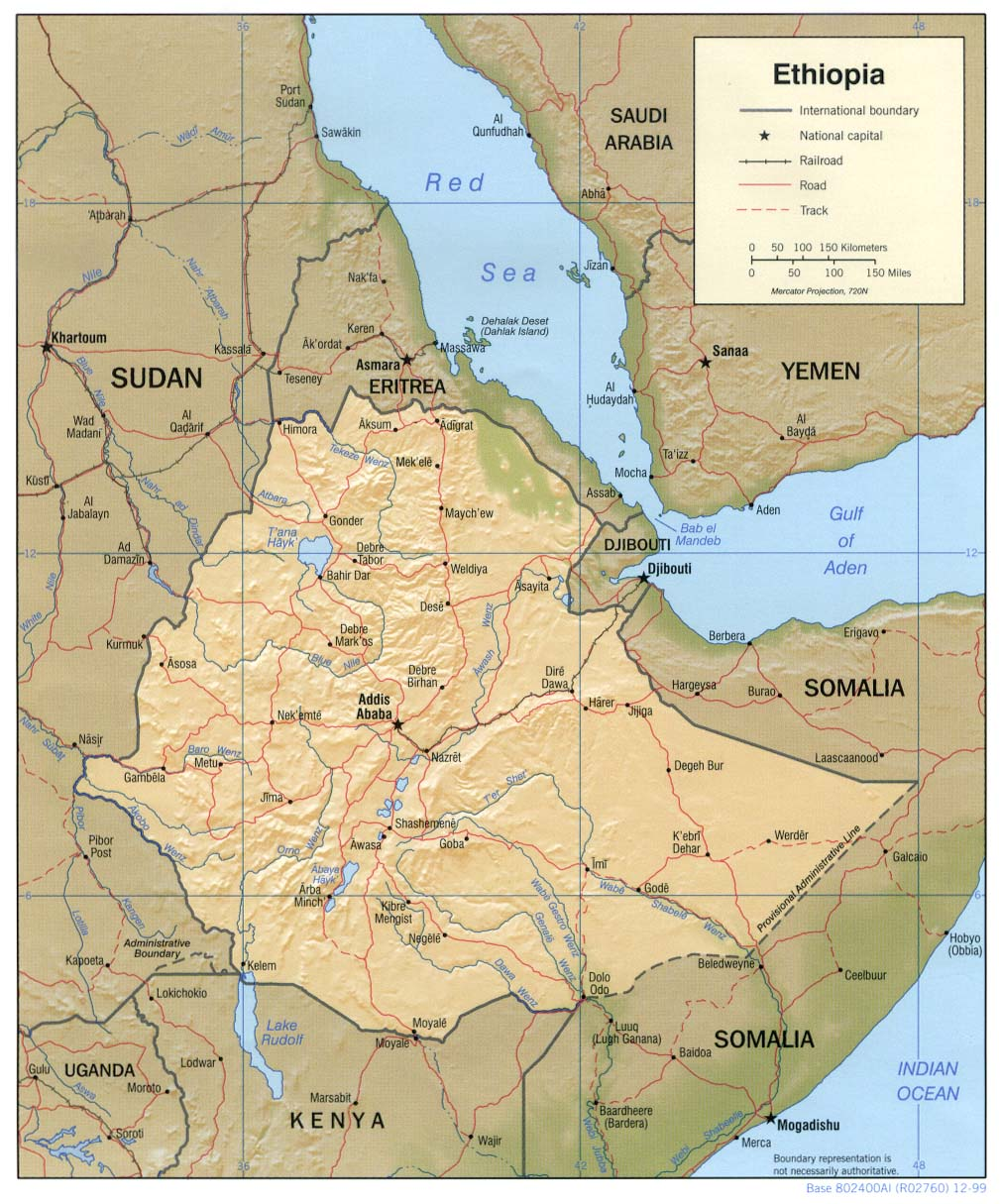
An enlargeable relief map of Ethiopia

- Pronunciation: /iːθiˈoʊpiə/
- Common English country name: Ethiopia
- Official English country name: The Federal Democratic Republic of Ethiopia
- Common endonym(s):
- Official endonym(s):
- Adjectival(s): Ethiopian
- Demonym(s): Ethiopian
- Etymology: Name of Ethiopia
- International rankings of Ethiopia
- ISO country codes: ET, ETH, 231
- ISO region codes: See ISO 3166-2:ET
- Internet country code top-level domain: .et

== Geography of Ethiopia ==
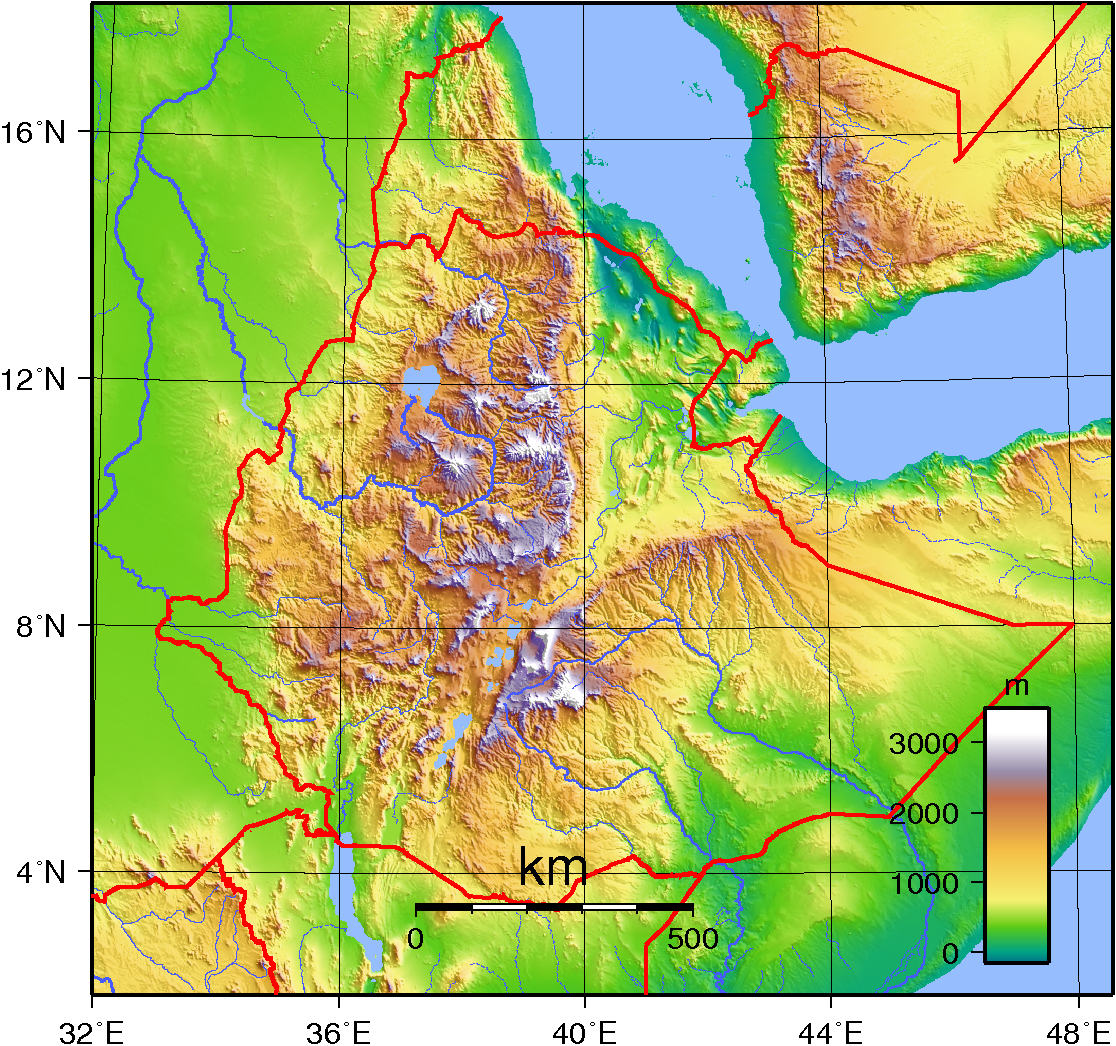
An enlargeable topographic map of Ethiopia

Geography of Ethiopia

- Ethiopia is: a landlocked country
- Location:
  - Eastern Hemisphere and Northern Hemisphere
  - Africa
    - North Africa
    - East Africa
      - Horn of Africa
  - Time zone: East Africa Time (UTC+03)
  - Extreme points of Ethiopia
    - High: Ras Dejen 4,550 m (14,928 ft)
    - Low: Denakil Depression −125 m (−410 ft)
  - Land boundaries: 5,328 km

Sudan 723 km
South Sudan 883 km
Somalia 1,600 km
Eritrea 912 km
Kenya 861 km
Djibouti 349 km

- Coastline: none

- Population of Ethiopia: 79,221,000 (July 2008) - 13th most populous country
- Area of Ethiopia: 1,104,300 km^{2}
- Atlas of Ethiopia

=== Environment of Ethiopia ===
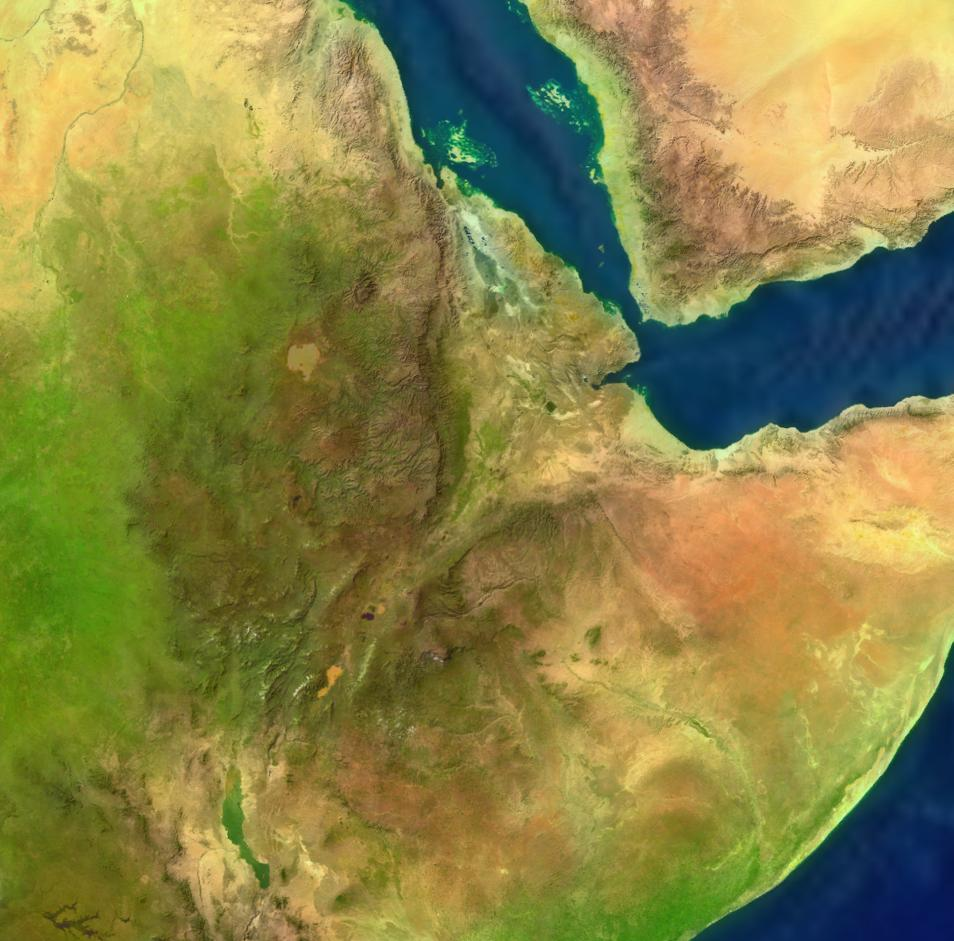
An enlargeable satellite image of Ethiopia

Environment of Ethiopia

- Climate of Ethiopia
- Environmental issues in Ethiopia
- Ecoregions in Ethiopia
- Renewable energy in Ethiopia
- Protected areas of Ethiopia
  - National parks of Ethiopia
- Wildlife of Ethiopia
  - Fauna of Ethiopia
    - Birds of Ethiopia
    - Mammals of Ethiopia

==== Natural geographic features of Ethiopia ====
- Glaciers in Ethiopia: none
- Islands of Ethiopia
- Lakes of Ethiopia
- Mountains of Ethiopia
  - Volcanoes in Ethiopia
- Rivers of Ethiopia
- World Heritage Sites in Ethiopia

=== Regions of Ethiopia ===
Regions of Ethiopia

==== Ecoregions of Ethiopia ====
List of ecoregions in Ethiopia

==== Administrative divisions of Ethiopia ====
Administrative divisions of Ethiopia

===== Regions of Ethiopia =====
Regions of Ethiopia

- Afar
- Amhara
- Benishangul-Gumuz
- Gambela
- Harari
- Oromia
- Somali
- Southern Nations, Nationalities, and People's Region
- Tigray

===== Zones of Ethiopia =====
Zones of Ethiopia

===== Municipalities of Ethiopia =====
- Capital of Ethiopia: Addis Ababa
- Cities of Ethiopia

=== Demography of Ethiopia ===
Demographics of Ethiopia

== Government and politics of Ethiopia ==
- Form of government: federal parliamentary republic
- Capital of Ethiopia: Addis Ababa
- Elections in Ethiopia
- Political parties in Ethiopia

=== Branches of the government of Ethiopia ===
Government of Ethiopia

==== Executive branch of the government of Ethiopia ====
- Head of state - President of Ethiopia, Taye Atske Selassie
- Head of government - Prime Minister of Ethiopia, Abiy Ahmed
- Council of Ministers
  - Prime Minister of Ethiopia - Abiy Ahmed
  - Deputy Prime Ministers of Ethiopia - Temesgen Tiruneh, Adem Farah

1. Ministry of Foreign Affairs - Gedion Timothewos
2. Ministry of Defense - Aisha Mohammed
3. Ministry of Federal Affairs - Shiferaw Teklemariam
4. Ministry of Justice - Berhan Hailu
5. Ministry of Civil Service - Fekadu Tesema
6. Ministry of Finance and Economic Development - Ahmed Shide
7. Ministry of Agriculture - Tefera Deribew
8. Ministry of Industry - Mekonnen Manyazewal
9. Ministry of Trade and Industry - Kebede Chane
10. Ministry of Science and Technology - Desse Dalke
11. Ministry of Transport - Diriba Kuma
12. Ministry of Communications and Information Technology - Debretsion Gebremichael
13. Ministry of Urban Development and Construction - Mekuria Haile
14. Ministry of Water and Energy - Alemayehu Tegenu
15. Ministry of Mines - Sinkinesh Ejigu
16. Ministry of Education - Demeke Mekonnen
17. Ministry of Health - Keseteberhan Admasu
18. Ministry of Labor and Social Affairs - Ergoge Tesfaye
19. Ministry of Culture and Tourism - Amin Abdulkadir
20. Ministry of Women, Youth and Children’s Affairs - Zenebu Tadesse

==== Legislative branch of the government of Ethiopia ====
- Federal Parliamentary Assembly (bicameral)
  - Upper house: House of Federation
  - Lower house: House of Peoples' Representatives

==== Judicial branch of the government of Ethiopia ====
Court system of Ethiopia

=== Foreign relations of Ethiopia ===
Foreign relations of Ethiopia

- Diplomatic missions in Ethiopia
- Diplomatic missions of Ethiopia
- Foreign aid to Ethiopia

==== International organization membership ====
The Federal Democratic Republic of Ethiopia is a member of:

- African, Caribbean, and Pacific Group of States (ACP)
- African Development Bank Group (AfDB)
- African Union (AU)
- African Union/United Nations Hybrid operation in Darfur (UNAMID)
- Common Market for Eastern and Southern Africa (COMESA)
- Food and Agriculture Organization (FAO)
- Group of 24 (G24)
- Group of 77 (G77)
- Inter-Governmental Authority on Development (IGAD)
- International Atomic Energy Agency (IAEA)
- International Bank for Reconstruction and Development (IBRD)
- International Civil Aviation Organization (ICAO)
- International Criminal Police Organization (Interpol)
- International Development Association (IDA)
- International Federation of Red Cross and Red Crescent Societies (IFRCS)
- International Finance Corporation (IFC)
- International Fund for Agricultural Development (IFAD)
- International Labour Organization (ILO)
- International Maritime Organization (IMO)
- International Monetary Fund (IMF)
- International Olympic Committee (IOC)
- International Organization for Migration (IOM) (observer)
- International Organization for Standardization (ISO)
- International Red Cross and Red Crescent Movement (ICRM)
- International Telecommunication Union (ITU)
- International Telecommunications Satellite Organization (ITSO)
- International Trade Union Confederation (ITUC)
- Inter-Parliamentary Union (IPU)
- Multilateral Investment Guarantee Agency (MIGA)
- Nonaligned Movement (NAM)
- Organisation for the Prohibition of Chemical Weapons (OPCW)
- Permanent Court of Arbitration (PCA)
- United Nations (UN)
- United Nations Conference on Trade and Development (UNCTAD)
- United Nations Educational, Scientific, and Cultural Organization (UNESCO)
- United Nations High Commissioner for Refugees (UNHCR)
- United Nations Industrial Development Organization (UNIDO)
- United Nations Mission in Liberia (UNMIL)
- United Nations Operation in Cote d'Ivoire (UNOCI)
- Universal Postal Union (UPU)
- World Customs Organization (WCO)
- World Federation of Trade Unions (WFTU)
- World Health Organization (WHO)
- World Intellectual Property Organization (WIPO)
- World Meteorological Organization (WMO)
- World Tourism Organization (UNWTO)
- World Trade Organization (WTO) (observer)

=== Law and order in Ethiopia ===
Law of Ethiopia

- Constitution of Ethiopia
- Human rights in Ethiopia
  - LGBT rights in Ethiopia
- Child marriage in Ethiopia
- Law enforcement in Ethiopia

=== Military of Ethiopia ===
Military of Ethiopia

- Command
  - Commander-in-chief:
    - Ministry of Defence of Ethiopia
- Forces
  - Army of Ethiopia
  - Navy of Ethiopia
  - Air Force of Ethiopia
- Military history of Ethiopia

=== Local government in Ethiopia ===
Local government in Ethiopia

== History of Ethiopia ==
History of Ethiopia

- Current events of Ethiopia
- Economic history of Ethiopia
- Military history of Ethiopia

== Culture of Ethiopia ==
Culture of Ethiopia

- Architecture of Ethiopia
- Cuisine of Ethiopia
  - List of Ethiopian dishes
- Languages of Ethiopia
- Media in Ethiopia
- National symbols of Ethiopia
  - Coat of arms of Ethiopia
  - Flag of Ethiopia
  - National anthem of Ethiopia
- People of Ethiopia
- Prostitution in Ethiopia
- Public holidays in Ethiopia
- Religion in Ethiopia
  - Christianity in Ethiopia
  - Hinduism in Ethiopia
  - Islam in Ethiopia
  - Judaism in Ethiopia
- World Heritage Sites in Ethiopia

=== Art in Ethiopia ===
- Cinema of Ethiopia
- Music of Ethiopia

=== Sports in Ethiopia ===
Sports in Ethiopia

- Football in Ethiopia
- Ethiopia at the Olympics

== Economy and infrastructure of Ethiopia ==
Economy of Ethiopia

- Economic rank, by nominal GDP (2007): 98th (ninety-eighth)
- Agriculture in Ethiopia
  - Coffee production in Ethiopia
  - Fishing in Ethiopia
  - Forestry in Ethiopia
- Banking in Ethiopia
  - National Bank of Ethiopia
- Communications in Ethiopia
  - Internet in Ethiopia
- Land reform in Ethiopia
- Companies of Ethiopia
- Currency of Ethiopia: Birr
  - ISO 4217: ETB
- Energy in Ethiopia
- Health care in Ethiopia
- Mining in Ethiopia
- Ethiopia Stock Exchange
  - Addis Ababa Stock Exchange
- Tourism in Ethiopia
- Trade unions in Ethiopia
- Transport in Ethiopia
  - Airports in Ethiopia
  - Rail transport in Ethiopia
- Water supply and sanitation in Ethiopia

== Education in Ethiopia ==
- Education in Ethiopia

== Health in Ethiopia ==
- Health in Ethiopia

== See also ==
- List of Ethiopia-related topics
- List of international rankings
- Outline of Africa
- Outline of geography
