= Deforestation in Ethiopia =

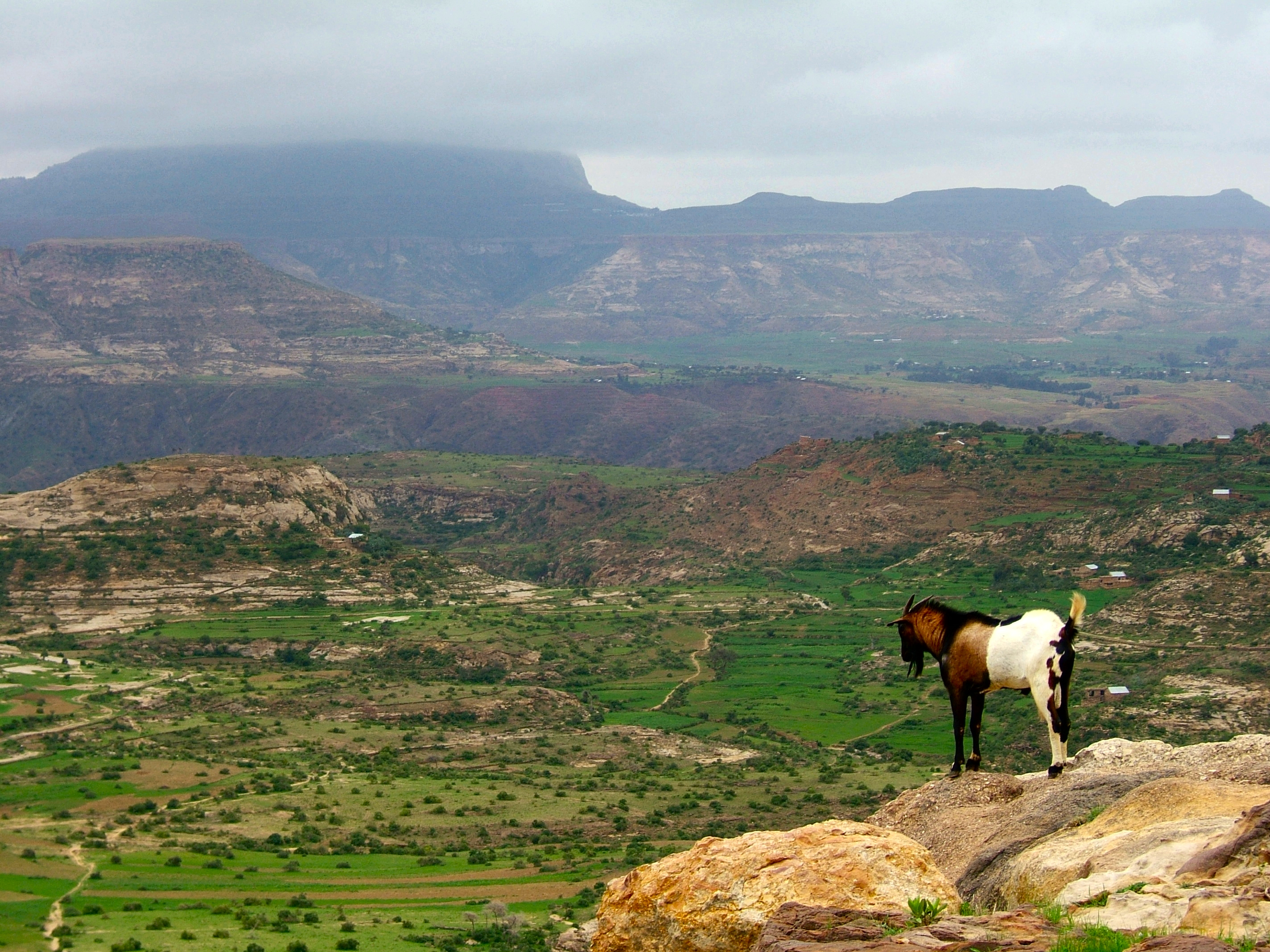
- Ethiopian Highlands
- Country: Ethiopia

According to the United Nations, Ethiopia loses 1.4 million hectares of forest annually, and has one of the highest deforestation rates in the world. The main causes of deforestation in Ethiopia are shifting agriculture, livestock production and fuel in drier areas. Deforestation has many negative consequences, including increased carbon dioxide in the atmosphere, loss of biodiversity, soil erosion, desertification, and more.

== Background ==
Ethiopia has a rich history of cultural and biological diversity. It is home to one of the earliest ancestors of the human species, around 80 languages are spoken by various ethnic groups, and it is home to two globally important biodiversity hotspots. This rich cultural and natural heritage is under threat, especially in the form of deforestation.

Ethiopia has the second-largest population in Africa and has been hit by famine multiple times due to rain shortages and a depletion of natural resources. Deforestation may have further lowered the already meagre rainfall. Bercele Bayisa, a 30-year-old Ethiopian farmer said "his district was very forested and full of wildlife but, overpopulation caused people to come to this fertile land and clear it to plant crops, cutting all trees to sell as fire wood". A rapidly growing population means more land is use for agriculture, and more wood is needed for construction and firewood. Ethiopia has poor laws protecting forests and increased deforestation leads to lowered agricultural productivity. The country has lost 98% of its forested regions in the last 50 years.

== Forests in Ethiopia ==
Forests in Ethiopia play a big role in protecting erosion, as tree roots protect against washouts. Trees also help to keep water in the soil and reduce global warming by uptake of carbon dioxide. Because there are not enough trees, the Blue Nile is carrying all the soil and nutrients in the water to the neighboring countries of Sudan and Egypt.

Historically, forests have been vital for the livelihoods of the Ethiopian People. Trees are used for construction lumber, and to fuel cooking fires. Ethiopian people also make traditional medicines from trees and other forest plants. Forests play an important role in Ethiopian religious beliefs. Mitchell Page states that over 6603 plant species live in Ethiopia, of which approximately one fifth are not native to other countries.

At the beginning of the twentieth century around 420,000 square kilometres (35% of Ethiopia's land) was covered by trees, but recent research indicates that forest cover is now less than 14.2% due to population growth. Despite the growing need for forested lands, lack of education among locals has led to a continuing decline of forested areas.

== Accelerated destruction ==
Earth trends estimated that in 2000 Ethiopia had 43,440 km² of natural forest area, which is 4% of its total land area. Compared to other East African countries Ethiopia's deforestation rate is about average. However, the deforestation rates in East Africa are second highest of the continent. Moreover, it has the smallest fraction of its forest area designated primarily for conservation. Apart from Northern Africa, East African countries show the second-highest decline rates of conservation forests in the continent.

In a forest resource assessment of Ethiopia, Reusing found that within 17 years (1973–1990) high-forest cover decreased from 54,410 to 45,055 km² or from 4.72 to 3.96% of the land area. He calculated a deforestation rate of 1,630 km² per year, which means that deforestation at the same rate would leave about 18,975 of the 45,055 km² in 2006. The FAO (2007) estimated a deforestation rate of 1,410 km² per year.

Dereje carried out a study in the coffee forest areas of southwest Ethiopia in order to estimate forest cover change between 1973 and 2005. The study area covered an area of 3,940 km² with 2,808 km² of high-forests (71% of the area) extended over five woredas (Bench, Sheko, Yeki, Guraferda, and Godere) in the two regional states of the Gambela and Southern Nations, Nationalities, and Peoples Regions. His analysis shows that the forested land declined to 1,907 km², which equals 67% of the forest cover in 1973. Between 2001 and 2005 another 55.4 km² of forest land were allocated for private coffee production and 20 km² for rubber plantations.

Gessesse studied an upland rain forest area of 3,060 km² in the Awasa watershed of the south-central Great Rift Valley, 280 km south of Addis Ababa. He estimated the rate of deforestation between 1972 and 2000 using remote sensing techniques. Furthermore, he could show that within the 28-year period 80% (400 km²) of the 1972 forest cover (489.24 km²) was lost. He describes that within the formerly closed forest, clearings created a speckled pattern of non-connected small forest patches.

Despite the slightly different estimates for deforestation in different regions of Ethiopia, given deforestation rates remain the same, the country will have lost its last tree of high forests within about 27 years. And with it will go the world's only original wild populations of Coffea arabica. The economic loss of that genetic resource ranges between 0.4 and US$1.5 billion/year.

== Causes of deforestation ==
Dereje explains deforestation in the coffee forest area he studied by linking it to historical events in certain time periods. From 1973 to 87 forest cover reduced by 11%. That period was characterized by resettlement and villagization programs and the expansion of state farm programs. Twenty-four percent of forest loss was a result of converting 101.28 square kilometers of high forests into coffee plantations. In later periods forests continued to be converted to agroforestry systems, agricultural land and settlement areas. The speed and pattern varies depending on the distance to state monitoring and coincides with changes in government.

From the 1950s to 1974 private land ownership was promoted through land grants to civil servants and war veterans. During this period mechanized farming became increasingly attractive. As a result, large numbers of rural people were dislocated – also to forest areas. Recently pressure comes from intensive management of forest coffee and semi-forest coffee which drastically changes the structure and functions of the original forests. Improved transport and communication infrastructure and thereby better access to markets is facilitating deforestation. More forest cover change was detected close to areas with good road networks and around settlements.

Gessesse Dessie and Carl Christiansson identify an entire combination of biophysical and socio-political conditions for forest decline in the Awassa watershed area. Geographic properties, socio-political change, population growth, insecurity of land tenure, agricultural development and the improvement of transport capacities are among the most important. As a result of a political power vacuum during periods of political transition, large forest areas were cut down.

Those proximate reasons are accompanied by underlying causes for deforestation. Faced by food insecurity agricultural land is just more valuable to farmers. Individual farmers do not have many other options than converting forests into agricultural land if they are exposed to severe food insecurity. Their time preference rates are low which means they prefer food today over tomorrow and they definitely can not carry the costs of forest conservation for the larger national or global society.

== Deforestation and coffee production ==
The afromontane rainforests of Southwestern Ethiopia are the world's birthplace of Coffea arabica and harbor their last wild populations. The variability in their tolerance towards diseases and drought reflects the high genetic diversity of the wild coffee populations. Their value has been estimated between 0.42 and 1.458 billion US$ a year. Worldwide about 5 billion kg of coffee per year are consumed in the importing countries. Coffee houses have become popular and the specialty coffee market is booming.

Economically valuable forests in Ethiopia, which contain the world's only wild Coffea arabica populations are diminishing and, at current deforestation rates, will be completely lost in 27 years. Deforestation in Ethiopia is caused by past governmental and institutional changes, insecurity of land tenure, resettlement programs, population pressure, agricultural and infrastructure developments. Farmers suffer from poverty as well as food insecurity and cannot bear the costs of forest conservation. Ethiopian and international stakeholders are involved in a competitive game for resources, rights and mandates. That hinders collective action and cooperation to prevent deforestation. Apart from appropriate economic incentives, environmental education, public awareness and civil society engagement need to be strengthened and trust needs to be rebuilt between stakeholders. Capacities for conservation must be built by devolving authority. Despite being the birthplace of Coffea arabica and the source for one of the world's finest coffees, current commitment of the worldwide coffee industry to conserve the forests is negligible.

=== Locales of special concern ===
When the Derg military regime seized power in 1975, socialism was declared the guiding ideology for Ethiopia and all rural and forest land was nationalized. Central and Eastern European experience has taught us that state ownership of land is a disincentive to manage it productively and sustainably. However, also the current government adopted a constitution in 1995 in which forests (land and other natural resources) are declared exclusively state property. It also says that anybody who is willing to work the land has a right to obtain land without payment. Although this goal can be enforced through land allocation, it almost certainly will conflict with land users’ tenure security. This is because the administrative redistribution of land and use rights (in all Regions except Amhara) is contingent on physical residence, the amount of land to be rented out and the prohibition of mortgaging and sale of land. "This leads to confusion and provides scope for bureaucratic discretion."

In 1994 a proclamation made the distinction between public and private ownership of forests, declaring natural forests as state owned and allowing planted forests to be owned privately. The proclamation No. 94/1994 prohibits any person to use or harvest trees, settle, graze, hunt or keep bee hives in the state forest.

With the intention to improve tenure security, the first land certification scheme was initiated 1998 in Tigray and only 80% completed (because of the war with Eritrea). Shortly before the 2005 elections land certification continued also in other regions of Ethiopia. The results showed that certification has indeed improved tenure security and investments into land. However, certification of land rights cannot eliminate systemic uncertainty of the type of problem mentioned earlier in the context of administrative retribution of land. Also, the head of the Ethiopian Forum for Social Studies expressed doubt that "…a piece of paper will bring about (tenure) security because it leaves all other aspects of the (current) land tenure system intact, like interference by the authorities."

In 2000, a new approach to forest ownership and management was initiated with the help of international donor agencies. The so-called co-management approach builds on a contract between the government and communities which rely on forest management for their livelihood. Forest user groups are established and exclusive rights for forest use are granted to the members of the group. The contract confirms the boundaries of the forest, defines ownership and use and other specific conditions. The principal idea behind the co-management approach is that secured rights are a crucial incentive for sustainable management. After initial promising results, the sustainability of that approach still needs to be evaluated.

== Deforestation and drought ==
Horrific famines occurred in Ethiopia during the 1970s and 1980s, especially in the northern part of the country where there was a bad drought. Thousands of people died. Deforestation can exacerbate the problems caused by drought because rain is less likely to soak into the soil and replenish ground water. Trees also release less water into the atmosphere. Side effects of increased erosion also means that less water is absorbed, causing floods and increased runoff.

== Attitudes to deforestation in Ethiopia ==
It is costly to halt deforestation. Coffee companies have discovered the niche market for forest coffee from Ethiopia and are willing to pay higher prices to the farmer cooperatives in coffee forest areas. Consumers are promised that buying the coffee will improve incomes of farmers and therefore farmers are motivated to manage their coffee forests sustainably. Traditionally farmers have abandoned wild coffee collection when coffee prices were too low. Whether or not higher prices for forest coffee are an incentive either to over-harvest or harvest more sustainably, remains an open question. Currently there is no scientific evidence that higher prices for forest coffee are an incentive for sustainable harvest practices. In fact, even the knowledge about the amount of wild coffee that can be collected in a sustainable way is scarce.

Neither the Ethiopian government nor market incentives alone are able to prevent deforestation, necessitating the participation of local stakeholders as well. Much of Ethiopia's national budget is covered by international development aid. The government of Ethiopia has asked several international agencies, like the Japanese ICA, the German Technical Cooperation (GTZ) and FARM-Africa to get involved in Participatory Forest Management. Such projects aim at developing forest management plans and signing contracts between local communities and the government. Different areas of the remaining forests are divided among the foreign aid agencies, where they carry out projects on behalf of the government.

Environmental issues in Ethiopia face limited political and institutional support. Constraints on civil society engagement have restricted public awareness, advocacy, and educational initiatives related to sustainable forest management. Public engagement programs, such as the Ethiopian Coffee Forest Forum's "School Children Talent Competition Award on Biodiversity Conservation," have been organized to support community awareness and biodiversity conservation.

=== Government and deforestation ===
The government has begun teaching the people about the benefits of forests and encouraging the people to plant more trees and to protect what they have by providing them alternative home and agricultural materials. If any person cuts a tree, he or she needs to plant one to replace it.

The government is trying to provide the Ethiopian people with fuel and electrical machinery so the demand for forest resources is not as high. Additionally, the government is providing flat land with no pre-existing forests to promote agriculture so that deforestation is not necessary for modern agriculture.

There are governmental and nonprofit groups working with the government to protect the land. Organizations such as SOS and Farm Africa are working with the federal government and local governments to create a good system of forest management. The government is also working to relocate people who live in dry regions to places where they can find fertile land for farming, so that they would be able to support themselves without any assistance from the government. With the fund provided by E.C grant (around 2.3 million Euros) people were trained to protect the land from erosion and taught to use water for irrigation, which improved quality of life and the environment. Locals have now come to the realization that trees need legal recognition, and must be protected for future generations. One of the methods used to protect trees is to designate certain areas where trees may be chopped down and used, and other areas where trees are protected by law.

In 2019, Prime Minister Abiy Ahmed launched the Green Legacy Initiative, in an effort to fight against deforestation and restore ecosystems. According to TIME magazine, "Since launching the initiative, the country has seen a sharp decline in deforestation—down from 92,000 hectares (over 227,000 acres) in 2013, to 27,000 hectares (around 66,700 acres) in 2023 and 2024—and planted over 48 billion seedlings to aid in reforestation efforts, according to Kebede Yimam, director-general of the Ethiopian Forestry Development Unit."

== Tree cover extent and loss ==
Global Forest Watch publishes annual estimates of tree cover loss and 2000 tree cover extent derived from time-series analysis of Landsat satellite imagery in the Global Forest Change dataset. In this framework, tree cover refers to vegetation taller than 5 m (including natural forests and tree plantations), and tree cover loss is defined as the complete removal of tree cover canopy for a given year, regardless of cause.

For Ethiopia, country statistics report cumulative tree cover loss of 531,671 ha (5,316.71 km^{2}) from 2001 to 2024 (about 4.4% of its 2000 tree cover area). For tree cover density greater than 30%, country statistics report a 2000 tree cover extent of 12,040,337 ha (120,403.37 km^{2}). The charts and table below display this data. In simple terms, the annual loss number is the area where tree cover disappeared in that year, and the extent number shows what remains of the 2000 tree cover baseline after subtracting cumulative loss. Forest regrowth is not included in the dataset.

Annual tree cover loss in Ethiopia, 2001–2024. View chart definition.
Tree cover extent in 2000 minus cumulative tree cover loss in Ethiopia, 2001–2024 (loss-only residual; does not account for gain). View chart definition.

Annual tree cover extent and loss
Year	Tree cover extent (km2) (Note: This residual measure does not include forest regrowth.)	Annual tree cover loss (km2)
2001	120,283.90	119.47
2002	120,153.15	130.75
2003	120,013.78	139.37
2004	119,879.82	133.96
2005	119,721.14	158.68
2006	119,600.37	120.77
2007	119,344.28	256.09
2008	119,104.19	240.09
2009	118,811.41	292.78
2010	118,609.57	201.84
2011	118,454.94	154.63
2012	118,038.61	416.33
2013	117,730.10	308.51
2014	117,402.85	327.25
2015	117,300.08	102.77
2016	117,104.26	195.82
2017	116,750.22	354.04
2018	116,561.28	188.94
2019	116,305.45	255.83
2020	116,125.65	179.80
2021	115,928.13	197.52
2022	115,728.72	199.41
2023	115,366.09	362.63
2024	115,086.66	279.43

== REDD+ reference levels and forest monitoring ==
Ethiopia has submitted national forest reference emission level and forest reference level benchmarks under the UNFCCC REDD+ framework. On the UNFCCC REDD+ Web Platform, Ethiopia’s 2016 package is listed as having an assessed reference level, with a national strategy and a summary of information on the Cancún safeguards marked as reported, while a standalone national forest monitoring system submission is marked as not reported; a second Ethiopian reference-level submission, made in 2026, is listed as under technical assessment.

Ethiopia’s first assessed national FREL/FRL, submitted in 2016 and technically assessed in 2017, covered two REDD+ activities at national scale: reducing emissions from deforestation and enhancement of forest carbon stocks. Using a 2000–2013 historical reference period, the assessed benchmarks were 17,978,735 t CO2 eq per year for emissions from deforestation and −4,789,935 t CO2 eq per year for removals from enhancement of forest carbon stocks. The technical assessment reported that the benchmark included above-ground biomass, below-ground biomass and dead wood, reported CO2 only, and excluded litter and soil organic carbon because of data and methodological limitations.

In January 2026 Ethiopia submitted an updated national FREL/FRL that broadened the scope to include deforestation, forest degradation and forest gain (enhancement of forest carbon stocks), with a 2013–2017 historical reference period and nationwide coverage. The submission states that activity-data assessment was carried out through Ethiopia’s national forest monitoring system, using Landsat imagery, sample-based area estimation and accuracy assessment, and says the 2013–2017 period was chosen because reliable NFMS satellite imagery and land-use data were available and REDD+ MRV arrangements had been established. The submission also expands pool coverage to above-ground biomass, below-ground biomass, deadwood, litter and soil organic carbon, while still reporting CO2 only; on the REDD+ Web Platform, however, this 2026 reference level remains under technical assessment.

== See also ==
- Environmental issues in Ethiopia
- Church forests of Ethiopia
- EthioTrees
