= Hinduism in Ethiopia =

Ethiopian Hindus/Indians
- (India) (Ethiopia)

Total population
- Around 10,000

Regions with significant populations
- Addis Ababa

Religions
- Hinduism

Languages
- Hindi, Gujarati & Malayalam

Related ethnic groups
- Hindus, Indians, Indian diaspora, Gujaratis & Malayalis

Ancient links between India and Ethiopia have existed even before history was recorded during the Axumite period. (2nd to 9th century A.D.) According to historian Richard Pankhurst, "contacts between the land which came to be known as Ethiopia and India date back to the dawn of history." Trade between Ancient Indian Empire and the Axumite Kingdom flourished in the 6th century A.D. The ancient port of Adulis served as an entry-point and the hub of maritime trade via the Red Sea where Indian traders flocked to trade in spices and silk for ivory and gold.

In later periods, the arrival of Indian immigrants in the 17th century with the support of the Portuguese sailors, the Indian troops in 1868 brought by Robert Napier, who was then the Commander-in-Chief of the British Army in Bombay, and in 1935 when fascist Italy invaded Ethiopia, were important events. Indian artisans and workers played an important role in the development of the famous city of Gondar and the palace of Emperor Fasilides.

General Rawley had been loaned by India to set up a military academy for Ethiopia. A large number of Indians had been employed between the late sixties and the nineties on a contractual basis to teach in the country's primary and secondary schools. But with the overthrow of Emperor Haile Selassie by Colonel Mengistu, the new communist regime introduced a policy of “Ethiopianisation” which meant that foreigners were not allowed to teach in Ethiopian schools. Consequently, all the teachers and a large number of Indian businessmen moved to other destinations.

Only a few Indians remained behind, among whom were those who had settled down in the country for more than three generations.

== Hindus in Ethiopia ==
At one time there were more than 9,000 families in Ethiopia. By the mid-80s their number had come down to 8,000. Presently, the Indian community numbers approximately 1,500 nationals plus an approx. number of 400 teaching staff on contractual assignment.

Around a hundred of them are businessmen. Mainly from Gujarat, they work as commission agents of various import-export companies.

Another 150 are professors who teach in the Defence Ministry's Engineering College and in various faculties of leading Ethiopian universities and other institutions of higher learning, while two professor are there in Mekelle University serving in the department of Sociology. Six of them teach in the Civil Services College, an institution under the Prime Minister's Office that is similar to Administrative Staff College.

== Organizations ==
There are three associations, The Indian Association set up in 1937, The Hindu Mahajan and The Malayalam Association. There is also an Indian National School which is an autonomous institution set up in 1947 under the auspices of the Indian Association

Hindus are allowed cremation rights in Hindu Mahajan located in Addis Ababa.
