= Economic history of Ethiopia =

Development of GDP per capita

The economy of Ethiopia remained very traditional until the later 20th century, although Ethiopia—unlike most sub-Saharan countries—had maintained trade and contacts with the outside world for centuries. Since ancient times, Ethiopian traders exchanged gold, ivory, musk, and wild animal skins for salt and luxury goods, such as silk and velvet.

By the late nineteenth century, coffee had become one of Ethiopia's more important cash crops. At that time, most trade flowed along two major trade routes, both of which terminated in the far southwest in the Kefa-Jimma region. From there, one route went north to Mitsiwa, via Gonder and Adwa, and the other along the Awash River valley to Harer then on to Berbera or Zeila on the Red Sea.

Despite its many riches, Ethiopia never became a great trading nation. Most Ethiopians despised traders, preferring instead to emulate the country's warriors and priests. After establishing a foothold in the country, Greek, Armenian, and Arab traders became economic intermediaries between Ethiopia and the outside world. Arabs also settled in the interior and eventually dominated all commercial activity except petty trade.

Efforts to modernize and develop the economy in the final years of the monarchic period had relatively little success, and after the Ethiopian Revolution of 1974, nationalization, increased spending on the military and an unstable political climate did little to improve matters. A severe drought in much of the country in 1983–1985 led to a disastrous famine. Only in the 1990s did the economy begin to improve, although in 2021 disputes, including open warfare, between the Tigray Region and the national government were still causing serious disruption.

== 1941–1974 ==
When their occupation of Ethiopia ended in 1941, the Italians left behind a country whose economic structure had changed little in centuries. Some improvement had taken place in communications, particularly in road building, and some limited attempts had been made to establish a few industries and to introduce commercial farming, particularly in Eritrea, which Italy had occupied since 1890. Only a small proportion of the population participated in the money economy, so trade at the time consisted of barter. Wage labor was limited, economic units were largely self-sufficient, foreign trade was negligible, and the market for manufactured goods was extremely small.

During the late 1940s and 1950s, much of the economy remained unchanged. The government focused its development efforts on expanding the bureaucratic structure and ancillary services. Most farmers cultivated small plots of land or herded cattle. Traditional and primitive farming methods provided the population with a subsistence standard of living. In addition, many nomadic peoples in drier areas raised livestock and followed a life of seasonal movement. The agricultural sector grew slightly, and the industrial sector represented a small part of the total economy.

By the early 1950s, Emperor Haile Selassie I (reigned 1930–1974) had renewed calls for a transition from a subsistence economy to an agro-industrial economy. Ethiopia needed an infrastructure to exploit its resources, improved living conditions, and better health, education, communications, and other services. A key element of the emperor's new economic policy was centrally-administered development plans. Between 1945 and 1957, several technical missions, including one each from the United States, the Food and Agriculture Organization of the United Nations (FAO), and Yugoslavia, prepared a series of development plans. However, these plans failed to achieve any meaningful results, largely because basic statistical data were scarce and the government's administrative and technical capabilities were minimal.

In 1954–55 the government created the National Economic Council to coordinate the state's development plans. This agency, which was a policy-making body chaired by the emperor, devoted its attention to improving agricultural and industrial productivity, eradicating illiteracy and diseases, and improving living standards for all Ethiopians. The National Economic Council helped to prepare Ethiopia's first and second five-year plans.

The first five-year plan (1957–1961) sought to develop infrastructure to link isolated regions, particularly in transportation, construction, and communications. Another goal was an indigenous cadre of skilled and semiskilled personnel to work in processing industries to help reduce Ethiopia's dependence on imports. The plan also proposed to accelerate agricultural development by promoting commercial agricultural ventures. The second five-year plan (1962-67) began a 20-year program to change Ethiopia's predominantly agricultural economy to an agro-industrial one. The plan's objectives included diversification of production, introduction of modern processing methods, and expansion of the economy's productive capacity to increase the country's growth rate. The third five-year plan (1968-73) sought to raise manufacturing and agro-industrial performance. Unlike its predecessors, the third plan expressed the government's willingness to expand educational opportunities and to improve peasant agriculture. Total investment for the first five-year plan reached 839.6 million birr, about 25 percent above the planned 674 million birr figure; total expenditure for the second five-year plan was 13 percent higher than the planned 1,694 million birr figure. The allocation for the third five-year plan was 3,115 million birr.

The government lacked the administrative and technical capabilities to implement a national development plan, and staffing problems plagued the Planning Commission (which prepared the first and second plans) and the Ministry of Planning (which prepared the third). Many project managers failed to achieve plan objectives because they neglected to identify the resources (personnel, equipment, and funds) and to establish the organizational structures necessary to facilitate large-scale economic development.

During the first five-year plan, the gross national product (GNP) increased at a 3.2 percent annual rate as opposed to the projected figure of 3.7 percent, and growth in economic sectors such as agriculture, manufacturing, and mining failed to meet the plan's targets. Exports increased at a 3.5 percent annual rate during the first plan, whereas imports grew at a rate of 6.4 percent per annum, thus failing to correct the negative balance of trade that had existed since 1951.

The second five-year plan and third five-year plan anticipated that the economy would grow at an annual rate of 4.3 percent and 6.0 percent, respectively. Officials also expected agriculture, manufacturing, and transportation and communications to grow at respective rates of 2.5, 27.3, and 6.7 percent annually during the second five-year plan and at respective rates of 2.9, 14.9, and 10.9 percent during the third five-year Plan. The Planning Commission never assessed the performance of these two plans, largely because of a shortage of qualified personnel.

However, according to data from the Ethiopian government's Central Statistical Authority, during the 1960–61 to 1973–74 period the economy achieved sustained economic growth. Between 1960 and 1970, for example, Ethiopia enjoyed an annual 4.4 percent average growth rate in per capita gross domestic product (GDP). The manufacturing sector's growth rate more than doubled from 1.9 percent in 1960–61 to 4.4 percent in 1973–74, and the growth rate for the wholesale, retail trade, transportation, and communications sectors increased from 9.3 percent to 15.6 percent.

Relative to its neighbors, Ethiopia's economic performance was mixed. Ethiopia's 4.4 percent average per capita GDP growth rate was higher than Sudan's 1.3 percent rate or Somalia's 1 percent rate. However, Kenya's GDP grew at an estimated 6 percent annual rate, and Uganda achieved a 5.6 percent growth rate during the same 1960–61 to 1972–73 period.

By the early 1970s, Ethiopia's economy not only had started to grow but also had begun to diversify into areas such as manufacturing and services. However, these changes failed to improve the lives of most Ethiopians. About four-fifths of the population were subsistence farmers who lived in poverty because most of their meager production went to pay taxes, rents, debt payments, and bribes. On a broader level, from 1953 to 1974 the balance of trade registered annual deficits. The only exception was 1973, when a combination of unusually large receipts from the export of oilseeds and pulses and an unusually small increase in imports resulted in a favorable balance of payments of 454 million birr. With the country registering trade deficits, the government attempted to restrict imports and substitute locally produced industrial goods to improve the balance of trade. However the unfavorable trade balance continued. As a result, foreign grants and loans financed much of the balance of payments deficit.

== 1974–1991 ==
The 1974 revolution resulted in the nationalization and restructuring of the Ethiopian economy. After the revolution, the country's economy went through four phases.

Internal political upheaval, armed conflict, and radical institutional reform marked the 1974-78 period of the revolution. There was little economic growth; instead, the government's nationalization measures and the highly unstable political climate caused economic dislocation in sectors such as agriculture and manufacturing. Additionally, the military budget consumed a substantial portion of the nation's resources. As a result of these problems, GDP increased at an average annual rate of only 0.4 percent. Moreover, the current account deficit and the overall fiscal deficit widened, and the retail price index jumped, experiencing a 16.5 percent average annual increase. The basic economy during this time was dependent on the agriculture industry. Upwards of eighty percent of the population was directly or indirectly dependent upon agriculture for their livelihood.

In the second phase (1978-80), the economy began to recover as the government consolidated power and implemented institutional reforms. The government's new Development Through Cooperation campaign (commonly referred to as zemecha) also contributed to the economy's improvement. More important, security conditions improved as internal and external threats subsided. In the aftermath of the 1977-78 Ogaden War and the decline in rebel activity in Eritrea, Addis Ababa set production targets and mobilized the resources needed to improve economic conditions. Consequently, GDP grew at an average annual rate of 5.7 percent. Benefiting from good weather, agricultural production increased at an average annual rate of 3.6 percent, and manufacturing increased at an average annual rate of 18.9 percent, as many manufacturers whose had shut down, particularly in Eritrea, reopened. The current account deficit and the overall fiscal deficit remained below 5 percent of GDP during this period.

In the third phase (1980-85), the economy experienced a setback. Except for Ethiopian fiscal year (EFY) 1982–83, the growth of GDP declined. Manufacturing took a downturn as well, and agriculture reached a crisis stage. Four factors accounted for these developments. First, the 1984-85 drought affected almost all regions of the country, so the government committed scarce resources to famine relief and tabled long-term development projects. Consequently, the external accounts (as shown in the current account deficit and the debt service ratio) and the overall fiscal deficit worsened, despite international drought assistance totaling more than US$450 million. Close to eight million people became famine victims during the drought of the mid-1980s, and about 1 million died. Second, the manufacturing sector stagnated as agricultural inputs declined. Many industries exhausted their capacity to increase output; as a result, they failed to meet rising demand for consumer goods. Third, the lack of foreign exchange and declining investment reversed the relatively high rate of growth in manufacturing of 1978–80. Finally, Ethiopia's large military establishment created a major burden on the economy. Defense expenditures during this time absorbed 40 to 50 percent of the government's current expenditures.

In the fourth period (1985-90), the economy continued to stagnate, even though an improvement in the weather in EFY 1985–86 and EFY 1986–87, helped reverse the agricultural decline. The manufacturing sector also grew during this period, and GDP increased at an average annual rate of 5 percent. However, the lingering effects of the 1984-85 drought undercut these achievements and contributed to the economy's overall stagnation. During the 1985-90 period, the current account deficit and the overall fiscal deficit worsened to annual rates of 10.6 and 13.5 percent, respectively, and the debt service ratio continued to climb.

== 1991–present ==
Since 1991, the Ethiopian government has embarked on a program of economic reform, including privatization of state enterprises and rationalization of government regulation. While the process is still ongoing, the reforms have attracted much-needed foreign direct investment.

In 2015, Ethiopia had 2,700 millionaires, a number that has more than doubled since 2007. Their fortunes were mainly made in niches of economic rents (banks, mines, etc.) without investing in structural or strategic sectors (industrial production, infrastructure, etc.) and in no way promote economic development or represent a source of competition for Western multinationals.

The Ethiopian government is stepping up its efforts to attract foreign investors, particularly in the textile sector. They can now import machines without customs duties, and benefit from a tax exemption for ten years, rents much lower than market prices, and almost free water and electricity. Major brands have established themselves in the country, such as Decathlon, H&M and Huajian. These companies also benefit from a cheap labor force, with a monthly salary of around 35 euros. Finally, trade agreements between Ethiopia and the European Union allow them to export duty-free. There is huge economic reforms, starting from 2018, has been undertaken after the leadership of EPDRF-TPLF foll down and replaced by "Prosperity Party" leadership of Abiy Ahimed Ali (PHD).

== See also ==
- History of Ethiopia
