= Environmental issues in Ethiopia =

As in many neighboring countries, most environmental issues in Ethiopia relate to deforestation and endangered species.

== Geological issues ==
The Main Ethiopian Rift is geologically active and susceptible to earthquakes. Hot springs and active volcanoes are found in its extreme east close to the Red Sea. Elsewhere, the land is subject to erosion, overgrazing, deforestation, and frequent droughts. Water shortages are common in some areas during the dry season. The causes of degradation are primarily the demand for more land for agriculture, fuel and construction as well as for grazing grounds.

== Environmental Justice ==
Environmental injustice in Ethiopia is reflected in disparities in access to basic environmental services, including clean water, sanitation, and air quality, as well as in patterns of land use, industrial activity, and displacement. Studies have shown that rural and peripheral regions such as Afar, Somali, and parts of Oromia have significantly lower access to improved water sources and basic sanitation compared to urban areas, contributing to ongoing health and environmental risks. In urban areas such as Adama, low-income communities are disproportionately exposed to air pollution and have limited access to green spaces. These conditions have been associated with increased respiratory and cardiovascular health burdens. In addition, household air pollution from the use of solid fuels remains a major concern in regions like Jimma, where it has been linked to elevated rates of childhood multimorbidity and other adverse health outcomes.

Environmental injustice in the country also includes issues related to land acquisitions and extractive industries. Large-scale land deals, often described as development projects, have led to the displacement of Indigenous peoples and smallholder farmers without adequate consultation or compensation. Research by political ecologist Genene Wayessa has shown that land leasing practices in Ethiopia, particularly in the Oromia Region, have deprived local communities of traditional land-use rights, undermined livelihoods, and accelerated environmental degradation. These processes are often carried out in the absence of democratic participation or legal safeguards for affected populations, resulting in long-term socio-environmental injustice. The Lega Dembi gold mine in the Oromia Region has drawn widespread criticism for its environmental and health impacts on surrounding communities, including reports of water contamination, air pollution, miscarriages, and birth defects. The mine's license was temporarily suspended by the Ethiopian government in 2018 following public protests. Scholars have also pointed to the broader structural exclusion of groups such as the Oromo from environmental decision-making processes, framing these injustices within the context of ethnic and political marginalization.

== Endangered animals ==
=== Ethiopian wolf ===
The Ethiopian wolf is one of the rarest and most endangered of all canid species. The numerous names given to this species reflect previous uncertainties about its taxonomic position. However, the Ethiopian wolf is now thought to be related to the wolves of the genus Canis, rather that sold for about US$175 each to taxidermists who then retail the stuffed lions for US$400. "For the time being our immediate solution is to send them to the taxidermists, but the final and best solution is to extend the zoo into a wider area," Muhedin said.

The director of the wildlife division of Ethiopia's Ministry of Agriculture said he had no idea the lions were being culled.

== Deforestation ==
Ethiopia had a 2018 Forest Landscape Integrity Index mean score of 7.16/10, ranking it 50th globally out of 172 countries.
