= Fishing industry in Ethiopia =

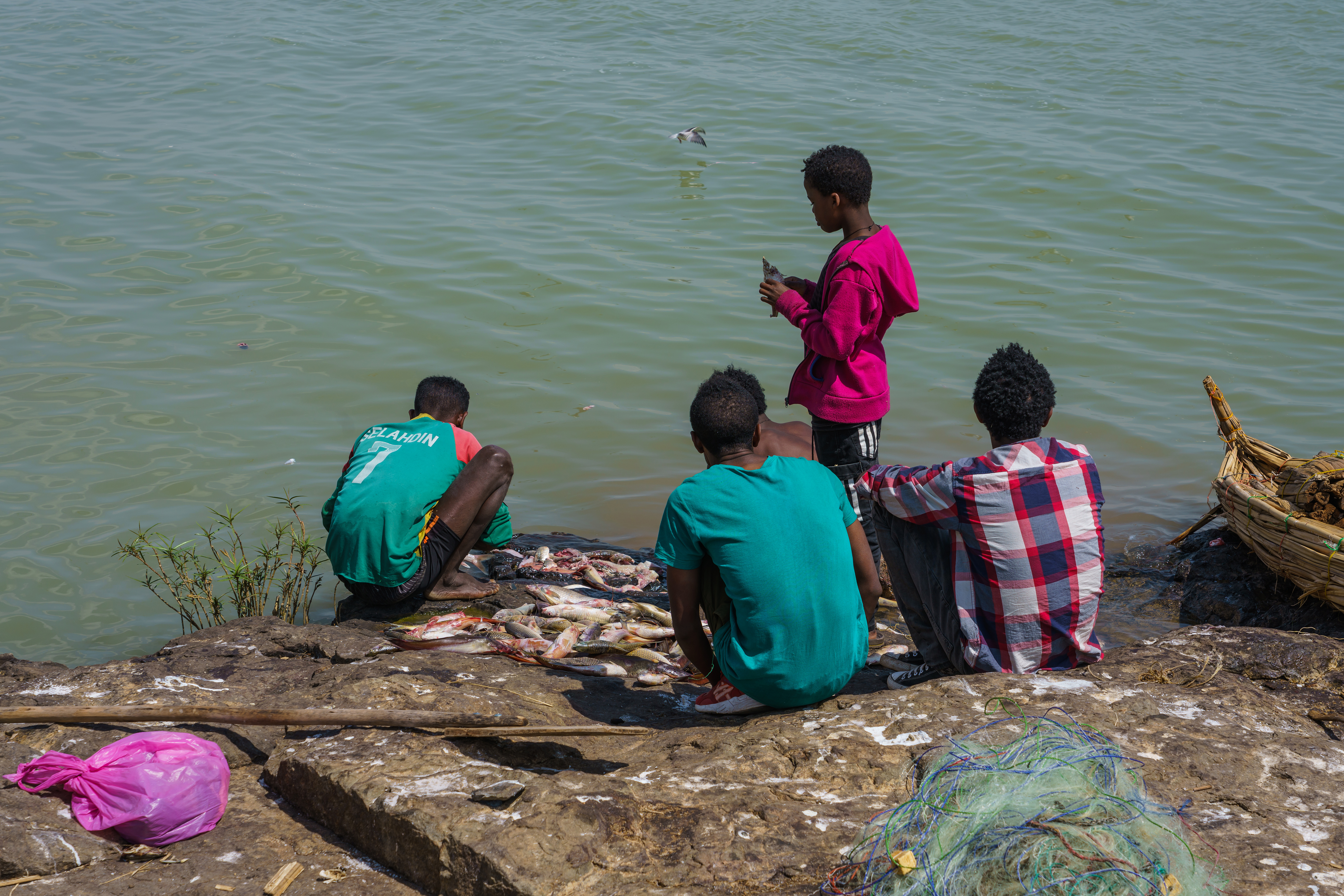
Fishermen at Lake Tana

Ethiopia's fisheries are entirely freshwater, in its many lakes, rivers, and reservoirs, as it has no marine coastline. Fishing contributed less than 1 percent of the gross domestic product in 1987. A study reported that 15,389 tonnes were caught in 2001, only 30% of an estimated potential of 51,481 tonnes.

Fresh fish are consumed in the vicinity of the Great Rift Valley lakes. Outside these areas, the domestic market for fish is small. Two factors account for this low level of local fish consumption. First, fish has not been integrated into the diet of most of the population. Second, because of religious influences on consumption patterns, the demand for fish is only seasonal. During Lent, for example, Christians who abstain from eating meat, milk, and eggs consume fish.

Although the Second Five-Year Agricultural Development Plan (2001-2005) laid down a number of targets to improve the yield of Ethiopia's fisheries, a number of problems remain to be overcome. Federal and state laws regarding commercial fishing did not exist until 2002/2003. This has led to localized overfishing. Some commercially important species are already suffering from overexploitation, including Nile perch in Lake Chamo, and tilapia in Lakes Awasa and Zway.

The largest fishery is in Lake Tana, the country's largest lake.

== See also ==
- Agriculture in Ethiopia
- Economy of Ethiopia
