= Agriculture in Ethiopia =

Development of agricultural output of Ethiopia in 2015 US$ since 1961

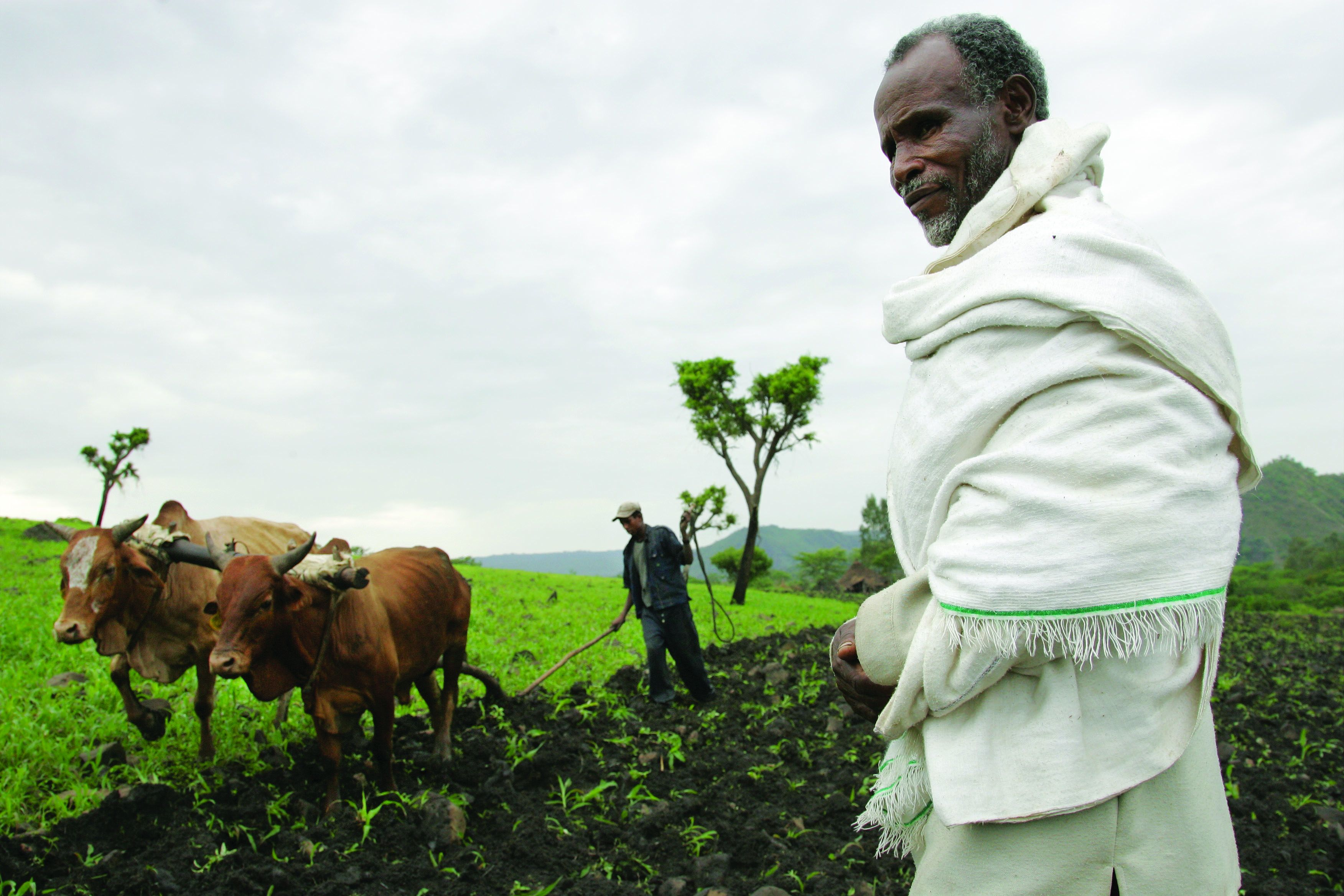
Ploughing with cattle in southwestern Ethiopia. The nation's agricultural production is overwhelmingly of a subsistence nature.

Agriculture in Ethiopia is the foundation of the country's economy. According to World Bank, agriculture, forestry, and fishing accounted for approximately 32.8% of Ethiopia’s GDP in 2025, while agriculture employed around 60% of the country’s workforce.

Ethiopia's agriculture is plagued by periodic drought, soil degradation caused by overgrazing, deforestation, high levels of taxation and poor infrastructure (making it difficult and expensive to get goods to market). As 85% of Ethiopians rely primarily on land (agricultural and pastoralism) for their livelihoods and a quarter of the population lives below the national poverty line, land degradation is a major concern. Yet agriculture is the country's most promising resource. A potential exists for self-sufficiency in grains and for export development in livestock, grains, vegetables, and fruits. As many as 4.6 million people need food assistance annually.

Agriculture accounts for 36% of the nation's GDP as of 2020. Many other economic activities depend on agriculture, including marketing, processing, and export of agricultural produce. Production is overwhelmingly of a subsistence nature, and a large part of commodity exports are provided by the small agricultural cash-crop sector. Principal crops include coffee, pulses (e.g., beans), oilseeds, cereals, potatoes, sugarcane, and vegetables. Exports are almost entirely agricultural commercial products, and coffee is the largest foreign exchange earner. Ethiopia is also Africa's second biggest maize producer. Ethiopia's livestock population is believed to be the largest in Africa, and in 2006–2007 livestock accounted for 10.6% of Ethiopia's export income, with leather and leather products making up 7.5% and live animals 3.1%.

== Overview ==
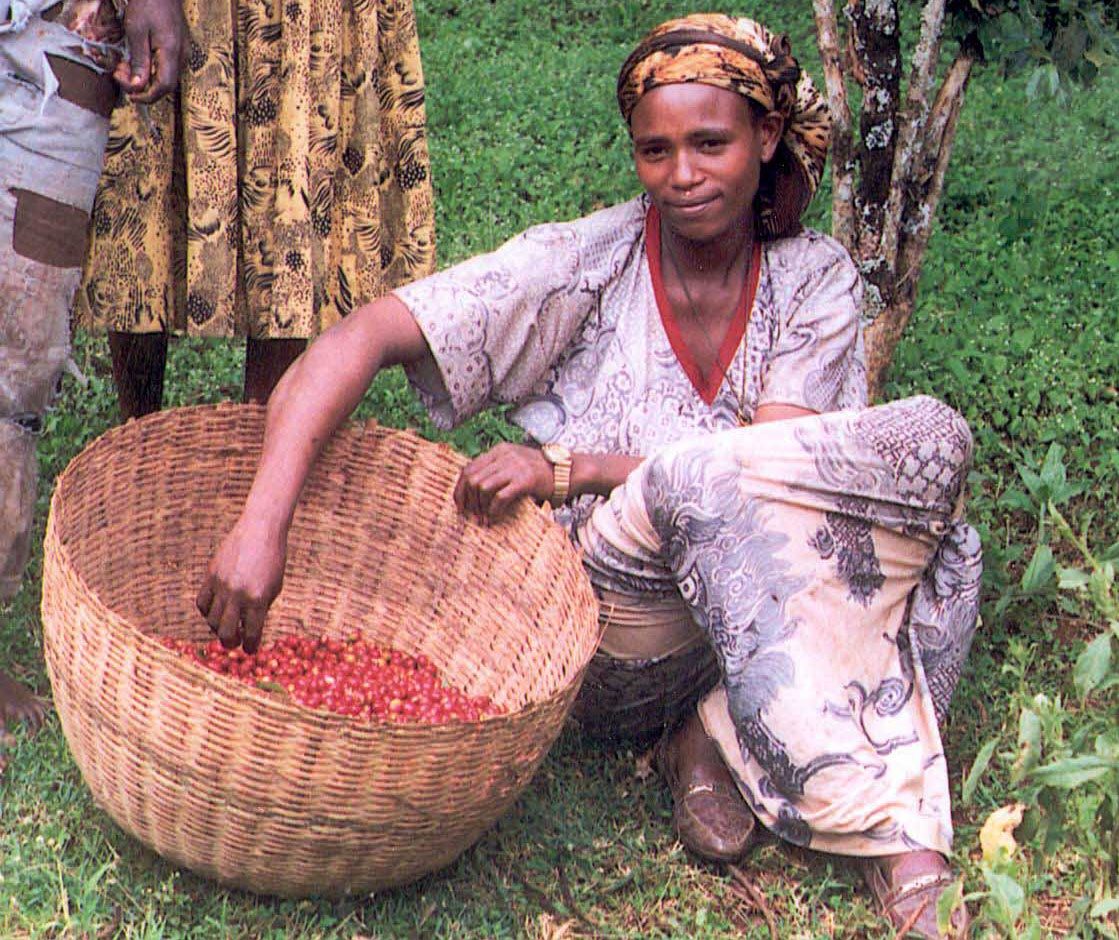
Coffee harvest in Ethiopia. Coffee, which originated in Ethiopia, is the largest foreign exchange earner.

Agriculture accounted for 50% of GDP, 83.9% of exports, and 80% of the labor force in 2006 and 2007, compared to 44.9%, 76.9% and 80% in 2002–2003, and agriculture remains the Ethiopian economy's most important sector. Ethiopia has great agricultural potential because of its vast areas of fertile land, diverse climate, generally adequate rainfall, and large labor pool. Despite this potential, however, Ethiopian agriculture has remained underdeveloped. Because of drought, which has repeatedly affected the country since the early 1970s, a poor economic base (low productivity, weak infrastructure, and low level of technology), and overpopulation, the agricultural sector has performed poorly. For instance, according to the World Bank between 1980 and 1987 agricultural production dropped at an annual rate of 2.1 percent, while the population grew at an annual rate of 2.4 percent. Consequently, the country faced a famine that resulted in the death of nearly 1 million people from 1984 to 1986. An additional challenge that contributes to lowered agricultural productivity is woody plant encroachment.

Historically, Ethiopia was a rare exception in Sub-Saharan Africa, because of its special environmental circumstances, that enabled Ethiopian farmers to increase their productivity, for example by using ploughs. The beneficial climate in the Highlands of Ethiopia also enabled irrigation and other advanced agricultural technology. Regular and reliable harvests helped generate stable tax income that led to relatively strong governmental structures that were ultimately the reason that Ethiopia was the only country not to be colonized in the late-nineteenth century ‘Scramble for Africa’ apart from Liberia.

During the imperial period, the development of the agricultural sector was retarded by a number of factors, including tenancy and land reform problems, the government's neglect of the agricultural sector (agriculture received less than 2 percent of budget allocations even though the vast majority of the population depended on agriculture), low productivity, and lack of technological development. Moreover, the emperor's inability to implement meaningful land reform perpetuated a system in which aristocrats and the church owned most of the farmland and in which most farmers were tenants who had to provide as much as 50% of their crops as rent. To make matters worse, during the 1972-74 drought and famine the imperial government refused to assist rural Ethiopians and tried to cover up the crisis by refusing international aid. As a result, up to 200,000 Ethiopians perished.

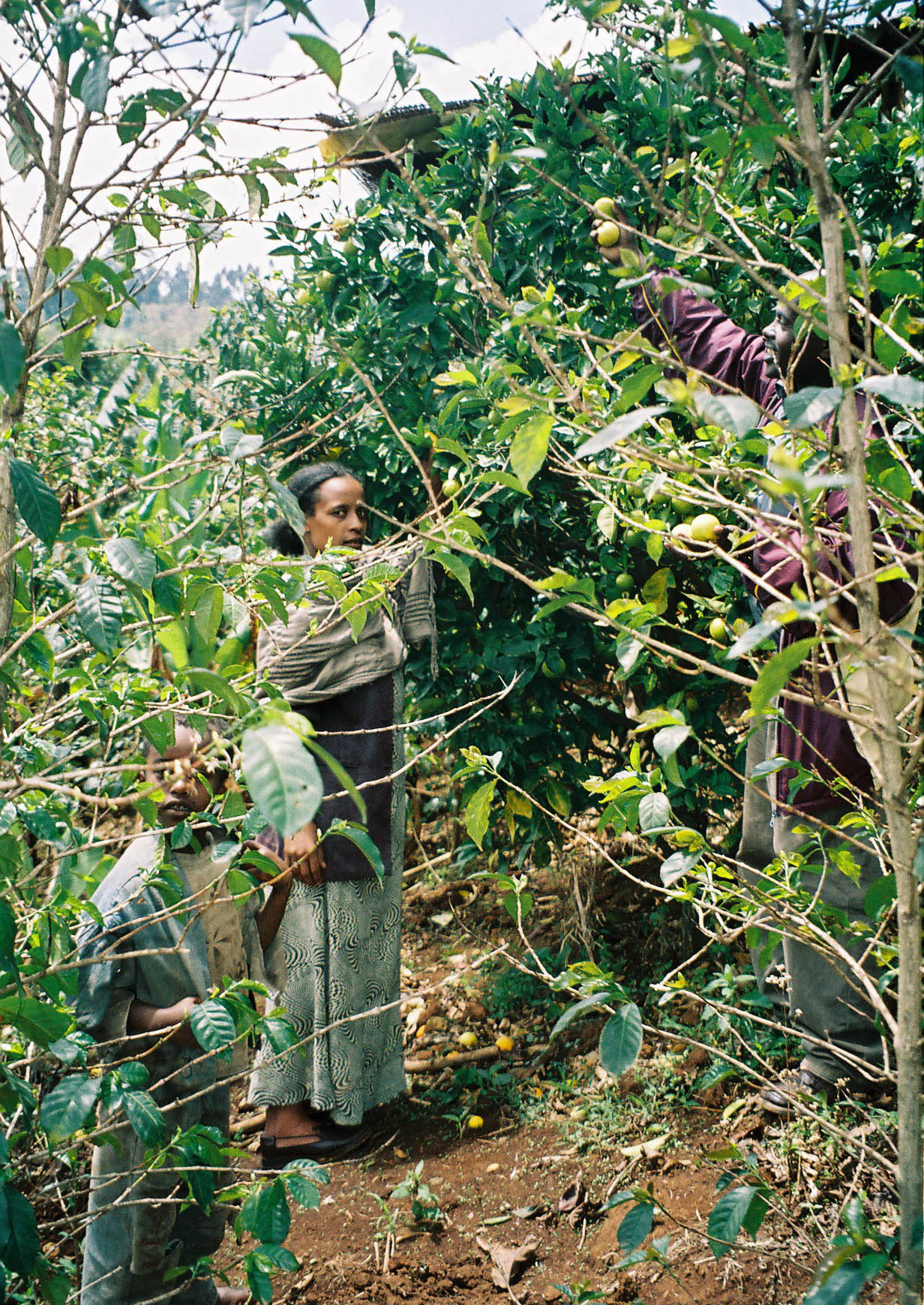
A fruit orchard in Ethiopia

Although the issue of land reform was not addressed until the Ethiopian Revolution in 1974, the government had tried to introduce programs to improve the condition of farmers. In 1971 the Ministry of Agriculture introduced the Minimum Package Program (MPP) to bring about economic and social changes. The MPP included credit for the purchase of items such as fertilizers, improved seeds, and pesticides; innovative extension services; the establishment of cooperatives; and the provision of infrastructure, mainly water supply and all-weather roads. The program, designed for rural development, was first introduced in a project called the Chilalo Agricultural Development Union. The program later facilitated the establishment of similar internationally supported and financed projects at Ada'a Chukala (just south of Addis Ababa), Welamo, and Humera. By 1974 the Ministry of Agriculture's Extension and Project Implementation Department had more than twenty-eight areas with more than 200 extension and marketing centers. Although the MPPs improved the agricultural productivity of farmers, particularly in the project areas, there were many problems associated with discrimination against small farmers (because of a restrictive credit system that favored big landowners) and tenant eviction.

Imperial government policy permitting investors to import fertilizers, pesticides, tractors and combines, and (until 1973) fuel free of import duties encouraged the rapid expansion of large-scale commercial farming. As a result, agriculture continued to grow, albeit below the population growth rate. According to the World Bank, agricultural production increased at an average annual rate of 2.1 percent between 1965 and 1973, while population increased at an average annual rate of 2.6 percent during the same period.

Agricultural productivity under the Derg continued to decline. According to the World Bank, agricultural production increased at an average annual rate of 0.6 percent between 1973 and 1980 but then decreased at an average annual rate of 2.1 percent between 1980 and 1987. During the same period (1973–87), population increased at an average annual rate of 2.6 percent (2.4 percent for 1980–87). The poor performance of agriculture was related to several factors, including drought; a government policy of controlling prices and the free movement of agricultural products from surplus to deficit areas; the unstable political climate; the dislocation of the rural community caused by resettlement, villagization, and conscription of young farmers to meet military obligations; land tenure difficulties and the problem of land fragmentation; the lack of resources such as farm equipment, better seeds, and fertilizers; and the overall low level of technology.

President Mengistu's 1990 decision to allow free movement of goods, to lift price controls, and to provide farmers with security of tenure was designed to reverse the decline in Ethiopia's agricultural sector. There was much debate as to whether or not these reforms were genuine and how effectively they could be implemented. Nonetheless, agricultural output rose by an estimated 3 percent in 1990–91, almost certainly in response to the relaxation of government regulation. This modest increase, however, was not enough to offset a general decrease in GDP during the same period.

== Land use ==
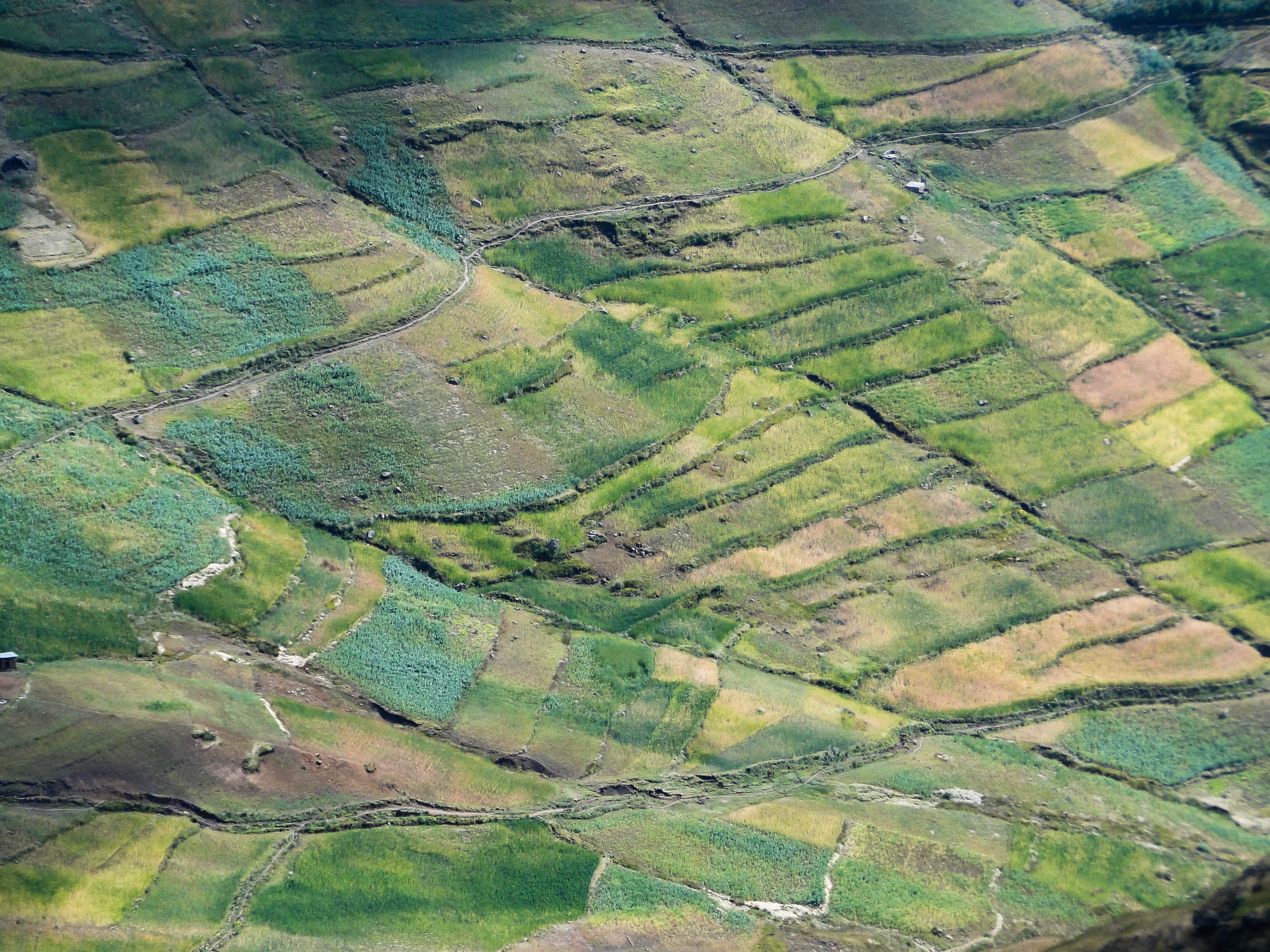
The hilly land has led to extensive terracing in some parts of the country.

Of Ethiopia's total land area of 1,221,480 square kilometers, the government estimated in the late 1980s that 15 percent was under cultivation and 51 percent was pasture. It was also estimated that over 60 percent of the cultivated area was cropland. Forestland, most of it in the southwestern part of the country, accounted for 4 percent of the total land area, according to the government. These figures varied from those provided by the World Bank, which estimated that cropland, pasture, and forestland accounted for 13%, 41%, and 25%, respectively, of the total land area in 1987.

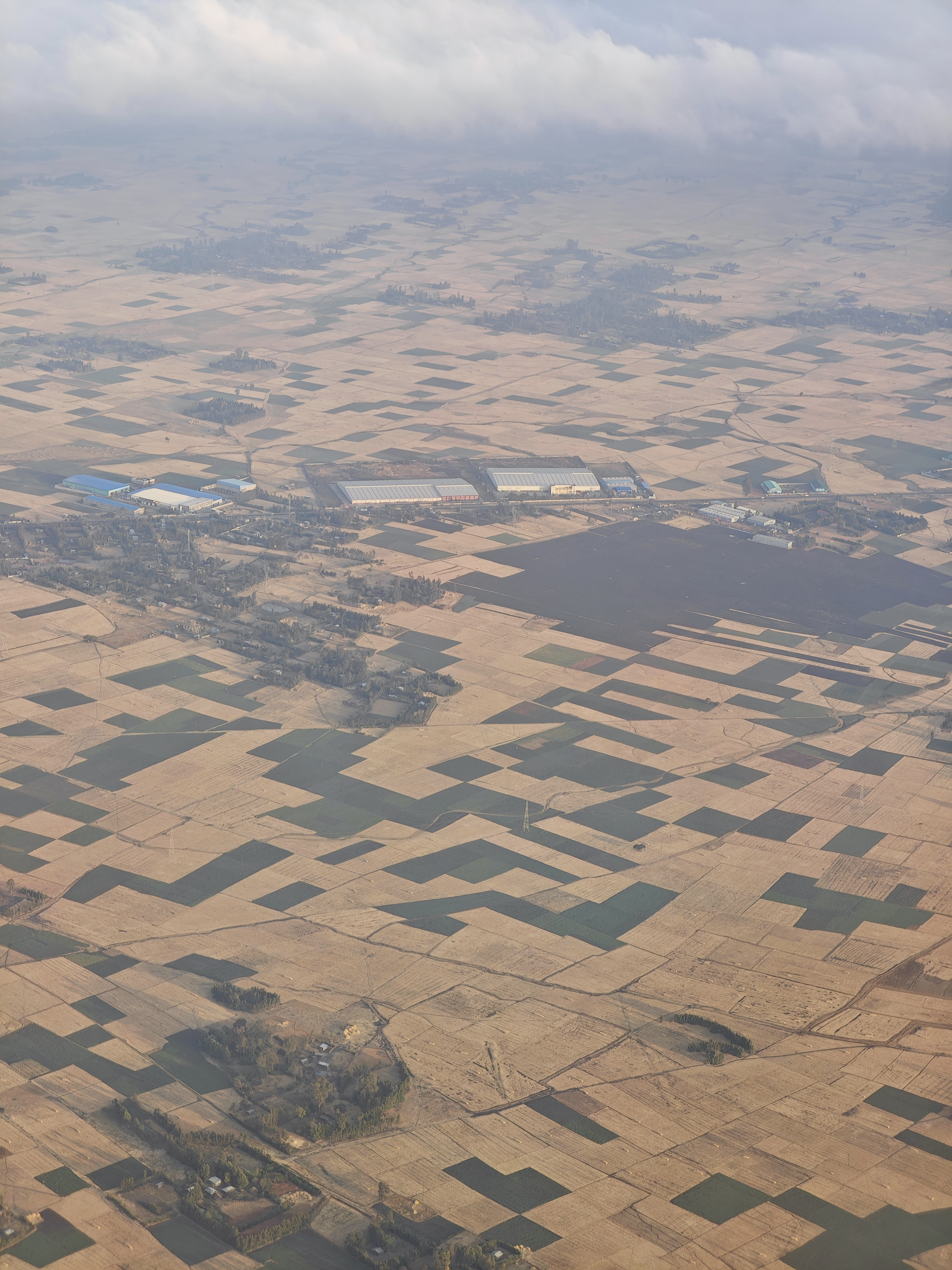
Aerial view of Ethiopian agriculture

Inaccessibility, water shortages, and infestations of disease-causing insects, mainly mosquitoes, prevented the use of large parcels of potentially productive land. In Ethiopia's lowlands, for example, the presence of malaria kept farmers from settling in many areas.

Most agricultural producers are subsistence farmers with small holdings, often broken into several plots. Most of these farmers lived in the Ethiopian Highlands, mainly at elevations of 1,500 to 3,000 meters. There are two predominant soil types in the highlands. The first, found in areas with relatively good drainage, consists of red-to-reddish-brown clayey loams that hold moisture and are well endowed with needed minerals, with the exception of phosphorus. These types of soils are found in much of the Southern Nations, Nationalities, and People's Region (SNNPR). The second type consists of brownish-to-gray and black soils with a high clay content. These soils are found in both the northern and the southern highlands in areas with poor drainage. They are sticky when wet, hard when dry, and difficult to work. But with proper drainage and conditioning, these soils have excellent agricultural potential. According to the Central Statistical Agency (CSA), in 2008 the average Ethiopian farmer holds 1.2 hectares of land, with 55.13% of them holding less than 1.0 hectare.

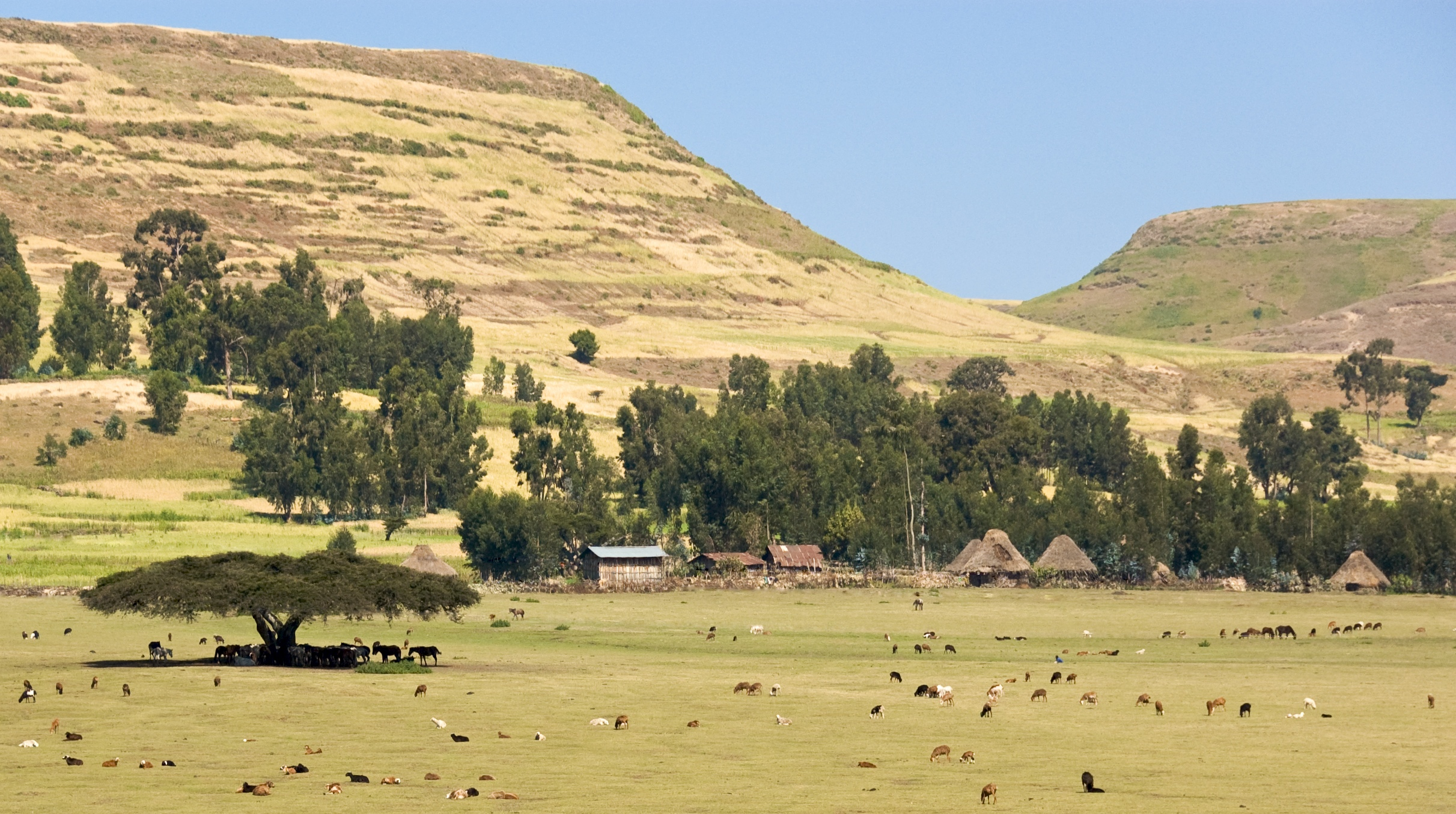
An Ethiopian farm

The population in the lowland peripheries (below 1,500 meters) is nomadic, engaged mainly in livestock raising. Sandy desert soils cover much of the arid lowlands in the northeast and in the Ogaden of southeastern Ethiopia. Because of low rainfall, these soils have limited agricultural potential, except in some areas where rainfall is sufficient for the growth of natural forage at certain times of the year. These areas are used by pastoralists who move back and forth in the area following the availability of pasture for their animals.

The plains and low foothills west of the highlands have sandy and gray-to-black clay soils. Where the topography permits, they are suitable for farming. The soils of the Great Rift Valley often are conducive to agriculture if water is available for irrigation. The Awash River basin supports many large-scale commercial farms and several irrigated small farms.

Soil erosion has been one of the country's major problems. Over the centuries, deforestation, overgrazing, and practices such as cultivation of slopes not suited to agriculture have eroded the soil, a situation that worsened considerably during the 1970s and 1980s, especially in Eritrea, Tigray, and parts of Gondar and Wollo. In addition, the rugged topography of the highlands, the brief but extremely heavy rainfalls that characterize many areas, and centuries-old farming practices that do not include conservation measures have accelerated soil erosion in much of Ethiopia's highland areas. In the dry lowlands, persistent winds also contribute to soil erosion.

During the imperial era, the government failed to implement widespread conservation measures, largely because the country's complex land tenure system stymied attempts to halt soil erosion and improve the land. After 1975 the revolutionary government used peasant associations to accelerate conservation work throughout rural areas. The 1977 famine also provided an impetus to promote conservation. The government mobilized farmers and organized "food for work" projects to build terraces and plant trees. During 1983-84 the Ministry of Agriculture used "food for work" projects to raise 65 million tree seedlings, plant 18,000 hectares of land, and terrace 9,500 hectares of land. Peasant associations used 361 nurseries to plant 11,000 hectares of land in community forest. Between 1976 and 1985, the government constructed 600,000 kilometers of agricultural embankments on cultivated land and 470,000 kilometers of hillside terraces, and it closed 80,000 hectares of steep slopes for regeneration. However, the removal of arable land for conservation projects has threatened the welfare of increasing numbers of rural poor. For this reason, some environmental experts maintain that large-scale conservation work in Ethiopia has been ineffective.

As of 2008, some countries that import most of their food, such as Saudi Arabia, had begun planning the development of large tracts of arable land in developing countries such as Ethiopia. This has raised fears of food being exported to more prosperous countries while the local population faces its own shortage.

== Land reform ==
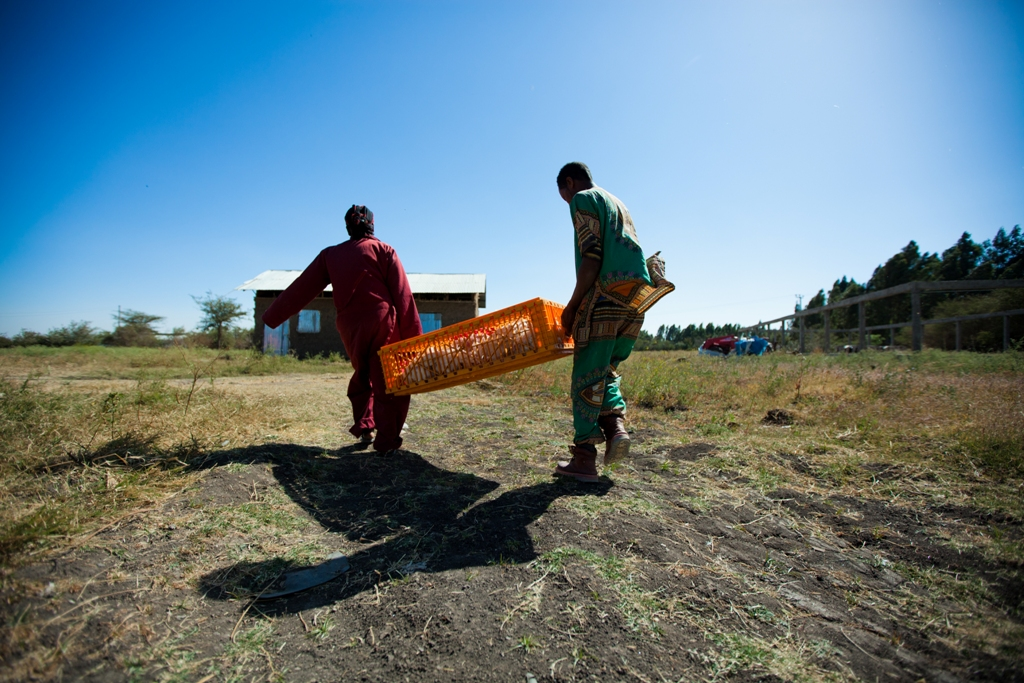
A USAID Development Credit Authority credit guarantee enabled this farmer to expand his poultry farm and employ more workers (2011).

Until the 1974 revolution, Ethiopia had a complex land tenure system, which some have described as feudal. In Wollo Province, for example, there were an estimated 111 types of land tenure. The existence of so many land tenure systems, coupled with the lack of reliable data, made it difficult to give a comprehensive assessment of landownership in Ethiopia, as well as depressed the ability of peasants to improve themselves.

By the mid-1960s, many sectors of Ethiopian society favored land reform. University students led the land reform movement and campaigned against the government's reluctance to introduce land reform programs and the lack of commitment to integrated rural development. Following their rise to power, on March 4, 1975, the Derg proclaimed their land reform program. The government nationalized rural land without compensation, abolished tenancy, forbade the hiring of wage labor on private farms, ordered all commercial farms to remain under state control, and granted each peasant family so-called "possessing rights" to a plot of land not to exceed ten hectares. Tenant farmers in southern Ethiopia, where the average tenancy was as high as 55% and rural elites exploited farmers, welcomed the land reform. But in the northern highlands, where title to farm land was shared amongst members of descent groups, many people resisted land reform. Despite the Derg's efforts to reassure farmers that land reform would not affect them negatively, northerners remained suspicious of the new government's intentions. Their resistance to this change increased when Zemecha members campaigned for collectivization of land and oxen.

Government attempts to implement land reform also created problems related to land fragmentation, insecurity of tenure, and shortages of farm inputs and tools. Peasant associations often were periodically compelled to redistribute land to accommodate young families or new households moving into their area. The process meant not only smaller farms but also the fragmentation of holdings, which were often scattered into small plots to give families land of comparable quality. Consequently, individual holdings were frequently far smaller than the permitted maximum allotment of ten hectares. A 1979 study showed that around Addis Ababa individual holdings ranged from 1.0 to 1.6 hectares and that about 48 percent of the parcels were less than one-fourth of a hectare in size. Another study, of Dejen awraja (subregion) in Gojjam, found that land fragmentation had been exacerbated since the revolution. For example, during the pre-reform period, sixty-one out of 200 farmer respondents owned three or four parcels of land; after the reform, the corresponding number was 135 farmers.

In 1984 the founding congress of the Workers' Party of Ethiopia (WPE) emphasized the need for a coordinated strategy based on socialist principles to accelerate agricultural development. To implement this strategy, the government relied on peasant associations and rural development, cooperatives and state farms, resettlement and villagization, increased food production, and a new marketing policy. Despite government efforts, farmers responded less than enthusiastically. While by 1988 a total of 3600 Service Cooperatives were serving 4.4 million households and almost 4000 Producer cooperatives comprising 302,600 households had been founded, in that year they represented only 5.5% of national cereal production.

Another major component of the Derg's agricultural policy was the development of large-scale state farms. Of an estimated 750,000 hectares of private commercial farms in operation at the time of the 1975 land proclamation, 67,000 hectares were converted into State Farms that, beginning in 1979, were operated by a new Ministry of State Farms. By 1989, the area covered by the State Farms had grown to a total of 220,000 hectares. However, despite substantial investments and subsidies, State Farms provided only 4.2% of the cereal production in 1988–89.

The primary motive for the expansion of state farms was the desire to reverse the drop in food production that has continued since the revolution. After the 1975 land reform, peasants began withholding grain from the market to drive up prices because government price-control measures had created shortages of consumer items. In addition, increased peasant consumption caused shortages of food items such as teff, wheat, corn, and other grains in urban areas. The problem became so serious that Mengistu lashed out against the peasantry on the occasion of the fourth anniversary of military rule in September 1978. Mengistu and his advisers believed that state farms would produce grain for urban areas, raw materials for domestic industry, and also increase production of cash crops such as coffee to generate badly needed foreign exchange. Accordingly, state farms received a large share of the country's resources for agriculture; from 1982 to 1990, this totaled about 43% of the government's agricultural investment. Despite the emphasis on state farms, state farm production accounted for only 6% of total agricultural output in 1987 (although meeting 65% of urban needs), leaving peasant farmers responsible for over 90% of production.

The objectives of villagization included grouping scattered farming communities throughout the country into small village clusters, promoting rational land use, conserving resources, providing access to clean water and to health and education services, and strengthen security. However, opponents of villagization argued that the scheme was disruptive to agricultural production because the government moved many farmers during the planting and harvesting seasons. There also was concern that villagization could have a negative impact on fragile local resources, accelerate the spread of communicable diseases, and increase problems with plant pests and diseases. In early 1990, the government essentially abandoned villagization when it announced new economic policies that called for free-market reforms and a relaxation of centralized planning.

== Agricultural production ==
The effect of the Derg's land reform program on food production and its marketing and distribution policies were among two of the major controversies surrounding the revolution. Available data on crop production show that land reform and the various government rural programs had a minimal impact on increasing the food supply, as production levels displayed considerable fluctuations and low growth rates at best. Since the fall of the Derg, there have been a number of initiatives to improve the food supply, which include research and training by the Ethiopian Institute of Agricultural Research.

Ethiopia produced in 2018:

- 7.3 million tons of maize (17th largest producer in the world);
- 4.9 million tons of sorghum (4th largest producer in the world);
- 4.2 million tons of wheat;
- 2.1 million tons of barley (17th largest producer in the world);
- 1.8 million tons of sweet potato (5th largest producer in the world);
- 1.4 million tons of sugar cane;
- 1.3 million tons of yam (5th largest producer in the world);
- 988 thousand tons of broad bean;
- 982 thousand tons of millet;
- 743 thousand tons of potato;
- 599 thousand tons of vegetable;
- 515 thousand tons of chick pea (6th largest producer in the world);
- 508 thousand tons of banana;
- 470 thousand tons of coffee (6th largest producer in the world);
- 446 thousand tons of cabbage;
- 374 thousand tons of pea (20th largest producer in the world);
- 322 thousand tons of onion;
- 301 thousand tons of sesame seed (7th largest producer in the world);
- 294 thousand tons of bell pepper;
- 172 thousand tons of lentil (11th largest producer in the world);
- 144 thousand tons of rice;
- 143 thousand tons of peanut;
- 140 thousand tons of cotton;
- 124 thousand tons of garlic;
- 102 thousand tons of mango (including mangosteen and guava);
- 101 thousand tons of linseed (7th largest producer in the world);

In addition to smaller productions of other agricultural products.

== Agricultural Goals: 2011-2015 ==
The Ethiopian Government set up the Growth and Transformation Plan (GTP) to reach certain goals between 2011 and 2015. Primarily, growth in the market should reach 8.1 percent per year during this time frame. This includes: bolstering smallholder farmers’ productivity, enhancing marketing systems, upgrading participation of private sector, increasing volume of irrigated land and curtailing amount of households with inadequate food.

In addition, it is hoped that the number of key crops are doubled from 18.1m metric to 39.5m metric tonnes. These programs should also result in Ethiopia getting to middle income status by 2025.

=== Major cash crops ===
==== Coffee ====
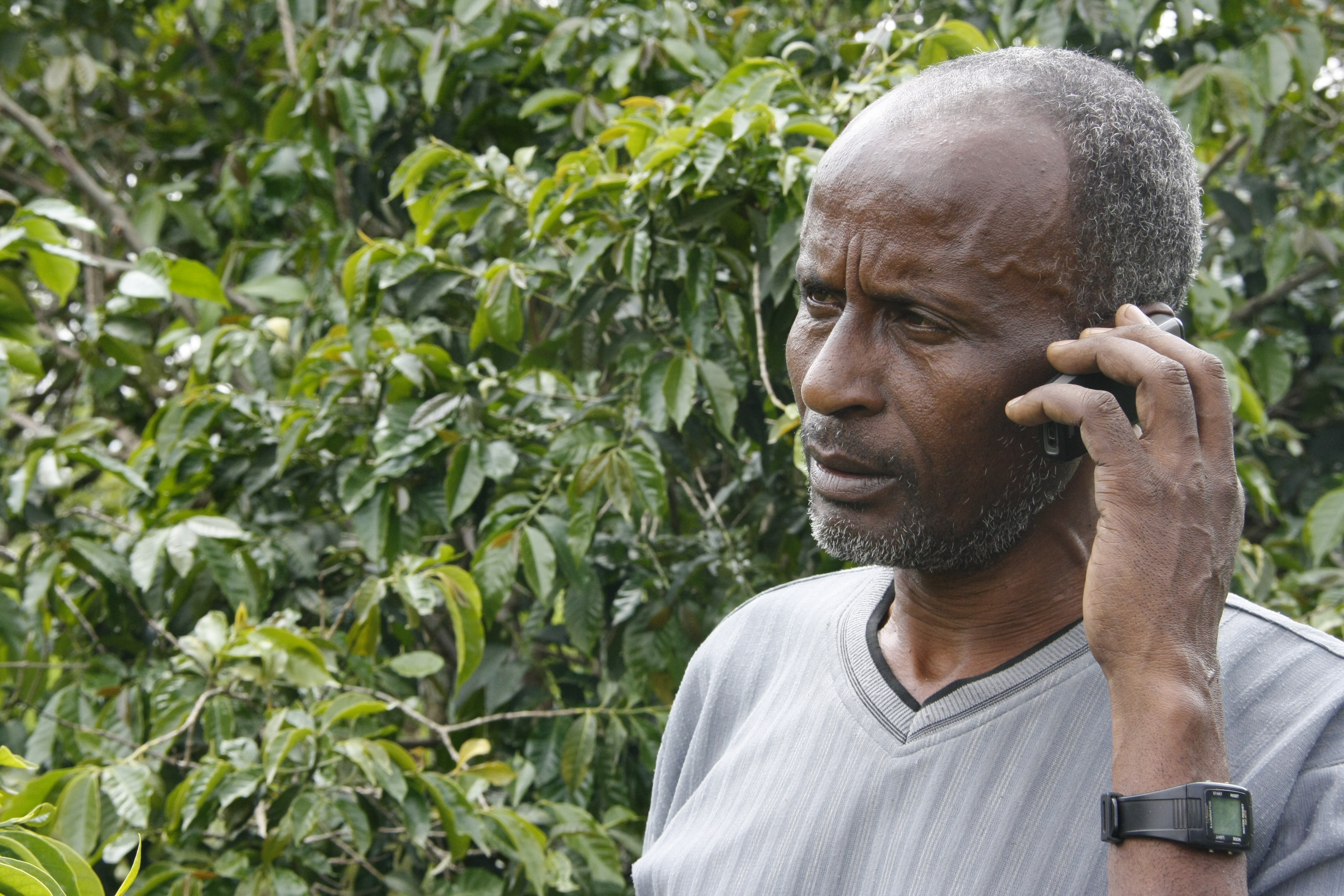
Coffee farmer Feleke Dukamo checks the latest coffee prices. The Ethiopia Commodity Exchange's new price information line already gets 40,000 calls a day from farmers like Feleke. Because he knows the price coffee is trading for in Addis Ababa, Ethiopia's capital, Feleke can drive a hard bargain with his buyers. (2011)

The most important cash crop in Ethiopia was coffee. During the 1970s, coffee exports accounted for 50-60% of the total value of all exports, although coffee's share dropped to 25% as a result of the economic dislocation following the 1974 revolution. By 1976 coffee exports had recovered, and in the five years ending in 1988–89, 44% of the coffee grown was exported, accounting for about 63% of the value of exports. Domestically, coffee contributed about 20% of the government's revenue. Approximately 25% of Ethiopia's population depended directly or indirectly on coffee for its livelihood.

Ethiopia's coffee is almost exclusively of the arabica type, which grows best at altitudes between 1,000 and 2,000 meters. Coffee grows wild in many parts of the country, although most Ethiopian coffee is produced in the Oromia Region (63.7%) and in the SNNPR (34.4%), with lesser amounts in the Gambela Region and around the city of Dire Dawa. The amount of coffee inspected in the fiscal year 2007–2008 by the Ethiopian Coffee and Tea Authority (ECTA) was 230,247 tons, a decrease of almost 3% from the previous fiscal year's total of 236,714 tons.

About 98 percent of the coffee was produced by peasants on smallholdings of less than a hectare, and the remaining 2 percent was produced by state farms. Some estimates indicated that yields on peasant farms were higher than those on state farms. In the 1980s, as part of an effort to increase production and to improve the cultivation and harvesting of coffee, the government created the Ministry of Coffee and Tea Development (now the ECTA), which was responsible for production and marketing. The ten-year plan called for an increase in the size of state farms producing coffee from 14,000 to 15,000 hectares to 50,000 hectares by 1994. However, beginning in 1987 the decline in world coffee prices, reduced Ethiopia's foreign-exchange earnings. In early 1989, for example, the price of one kilogram/US$0.58; of coffee was by June it had dropped to US$0.32. Mengistu told the 1989 WPE party congress that at US$0.32 per kilogram, foreign-exchange earnings from coffee would have dropped by 240 million Birr, and government revenue would have been reduced by 140 million Birr by the end of 1989.

==== Pulses and oilseed ====
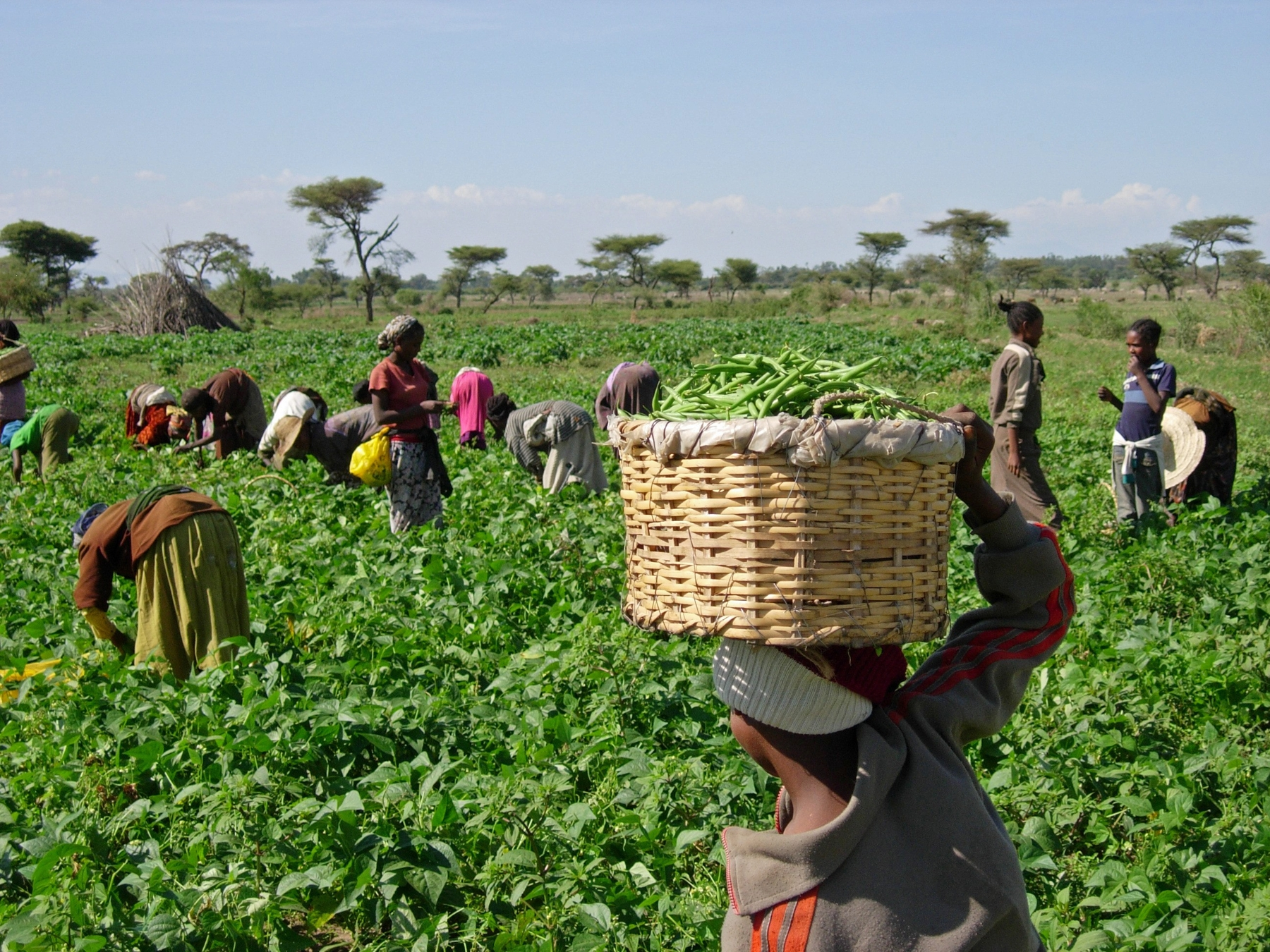
Women and children pick green beans at the Dodicha Vegetable Cooperative in Ethiopia. The beans will be sold to a local exporter, who will sell them to supermarkets in Europe (2005)

Before the Ethiopian Revolution, pulses and oilseeds played an important role, second only to coffee, in the country's exports. In EFY 1974–75, pulses and oilseeds accounted for 34% of export earnings (about 163 million Birr), but this share declined to about 3% (about 30 million Birr) in EFY 1988–89. Three factors contributed to the decline in the relative importance of pulses and oilseeds. First, the recurring droughts had devastated the country's main areas where pulses and oilseeds were grown. Second, because peasants faced food shortages, they gave priority to cereal staples to sustain themselves. Finally, although the production cost of pulses and oilseeds continued to rise, the government's price control policy left virtually unchanged the official procurement price of these crops, thus substantially reducing net income from them. In EFY 2007–2008, the CSA reported that 17,827,387.94 quintals of pulses were produced on 1,517,661.93 hectares, an increase from the 15,786,215.3 quintals produced on 1,379,045.77 hectares. In the same fiscal year, 707,059.29 hectares under cultivation produced 6,169,279.99 quintals of oilseeds, an increase from the previous year of 4,970,839.57 quintals grown on 741,790.98 hectares. In 2006–2007 (the latest year available), exports of oilseeds accounted for 15.78% of export earnings (or million 187.4 Birr) and pulses 5.92% (or 70.3 million Birr).

==== Flowers ====
Ethiopia's flower industry has become a new source for export revenue. The industry began in 2004, when the government made an aggressive push for foreign investments by establishing a presence at major international floricultural events. Since then, export earnings from this sector have grown to about US$65 million in 2006–07 and are projected to double over the next few years. Ethiopia is well positioned because highland temperatures make it ideal for horticulture, the average wage rate is US$20 per month (compared to US$60 a month in India), the price of leased land is about US$13 per hectare, and the government has tremendously aided the entry of new businesses into this sector in recent years. As a result, a number of Indian entrepreneurs are relocating to Ethiopia to develop its thriving flower industry which has led to gains in market share at the expense of neighboring countries.

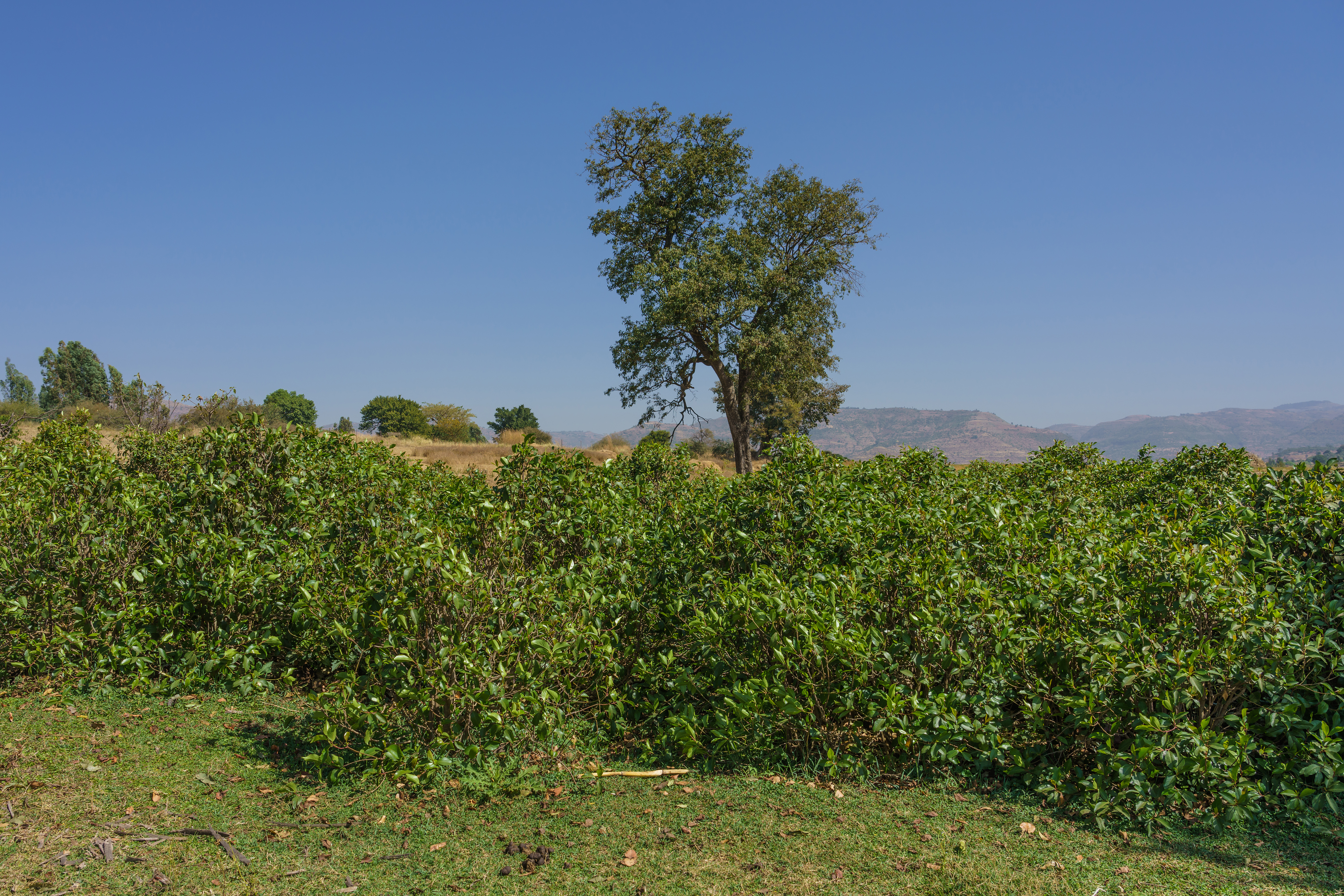
Khat plantation near Bahir Dar

==== Khat ====
Another new source for export revenue is the production of chat, an amphetamine-like stimulant which is consumed both inside Ethiopia and in adjacent countries, and which is considered a drug of abuse that can lead to mild to moderate psychological dependence. In 2006–2007 (the latest year available), exports of chat accounted for 25% of export earnings (or 8oo million Birr).

==== Cotton ====
Cotton is grown throughout Ethiopia below elevations of about 1,400 meters. Because most of the lowlands lack adequate rainfall, cotton cultivation depends largely on irrigation. Before the revolution, large-scale commercial cotton plantations were developed in the Awash Valley and the Humera areas. The Tendaho Cotton Plantation in the lower Awash Valley was one of Ethiopia's largest cotton plantations. Rain-fed cotton also grew in Humera, Bilate, and Arba Minch. Since the revolution, most commercial cotton has been grown on irrigated state farms, mostly in the Awash Valley area. Production jumped from 43,500 tons in 1974–75 to 74,900 tons in 1984–85. Similarly, the area of cultivation increased from 22,600 hectares in 1974–75 to 33,900 hectares in 1984–85.

=== Major staple crops ===
Ethiopia's major staple crops include a variety of cereals, pulses, oilseeds, and coffee.

==== Grains ====
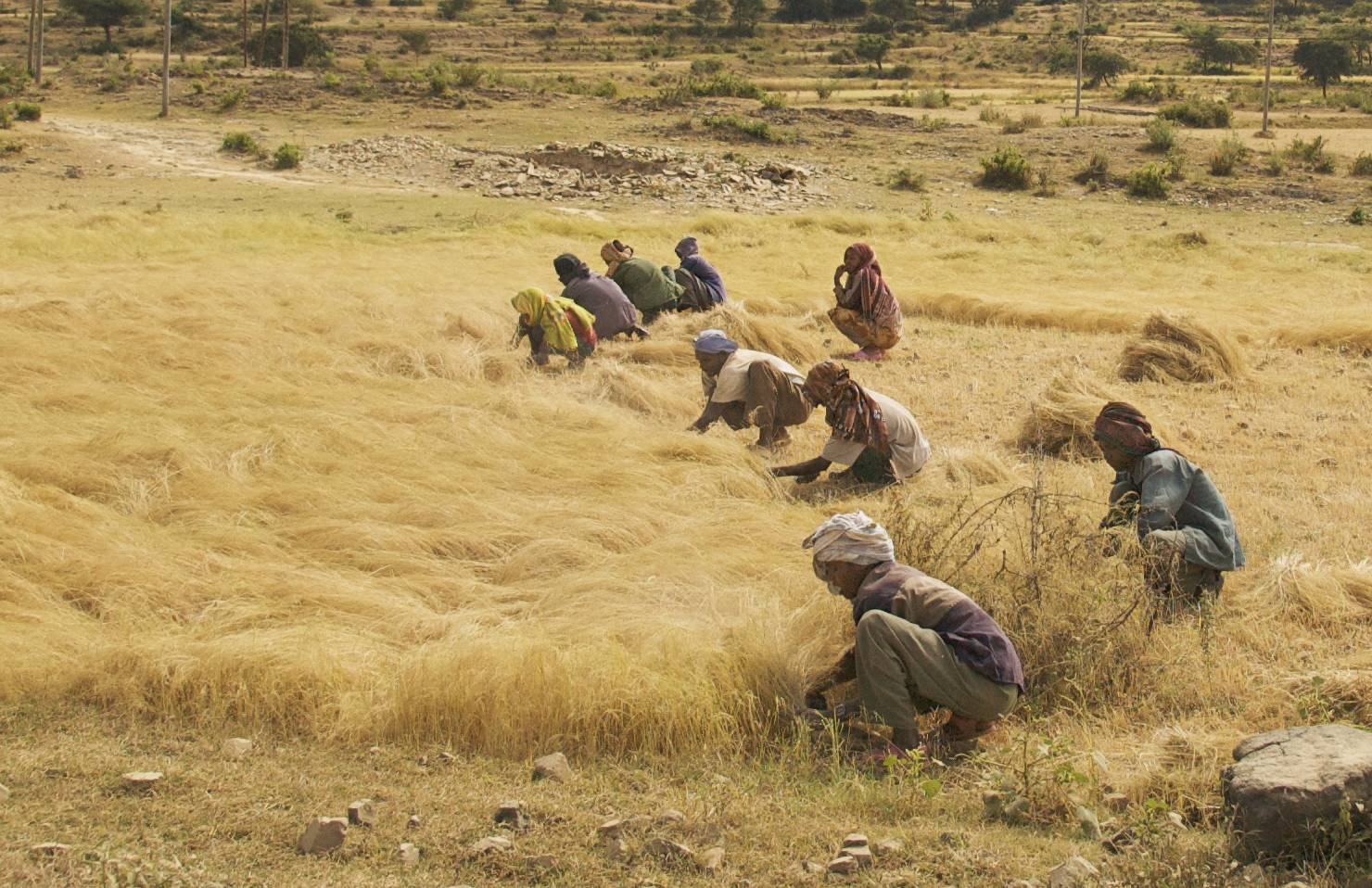
Teff harvest in northern Ethiopia (2007)

Grains are the most important field crops and the chief element in the diet of most Ethiopians. The principal grains are teff, wheat, barley, corn, sorghum, and millet. The first three are primarily cool-weather crops cultivated at altitudes generally above 1,500 meters. Teff, indigenous to Ethiopia, furnishes the flour for enjera, an sourdough pancake-like bread that is the principal form in which grain is consumed in the highlands and in urban centers throughout the country. Barley is grown mostly between 2,000 and 3,500 meters. A major subsistence crop, barley is used as food and in the production of tella, a locally produced beer.

Ethiopia's demand for grain continued to increase because of population pressures, while supply remained short, largely because of drought and government agricultural policies, such as price controls, which adversely affected crop production. Food production had consistently declined throughout the 1980s. Consequently, Ethiopia became a net importer of grain worth about 243 million Birr annually from 1983–84 to

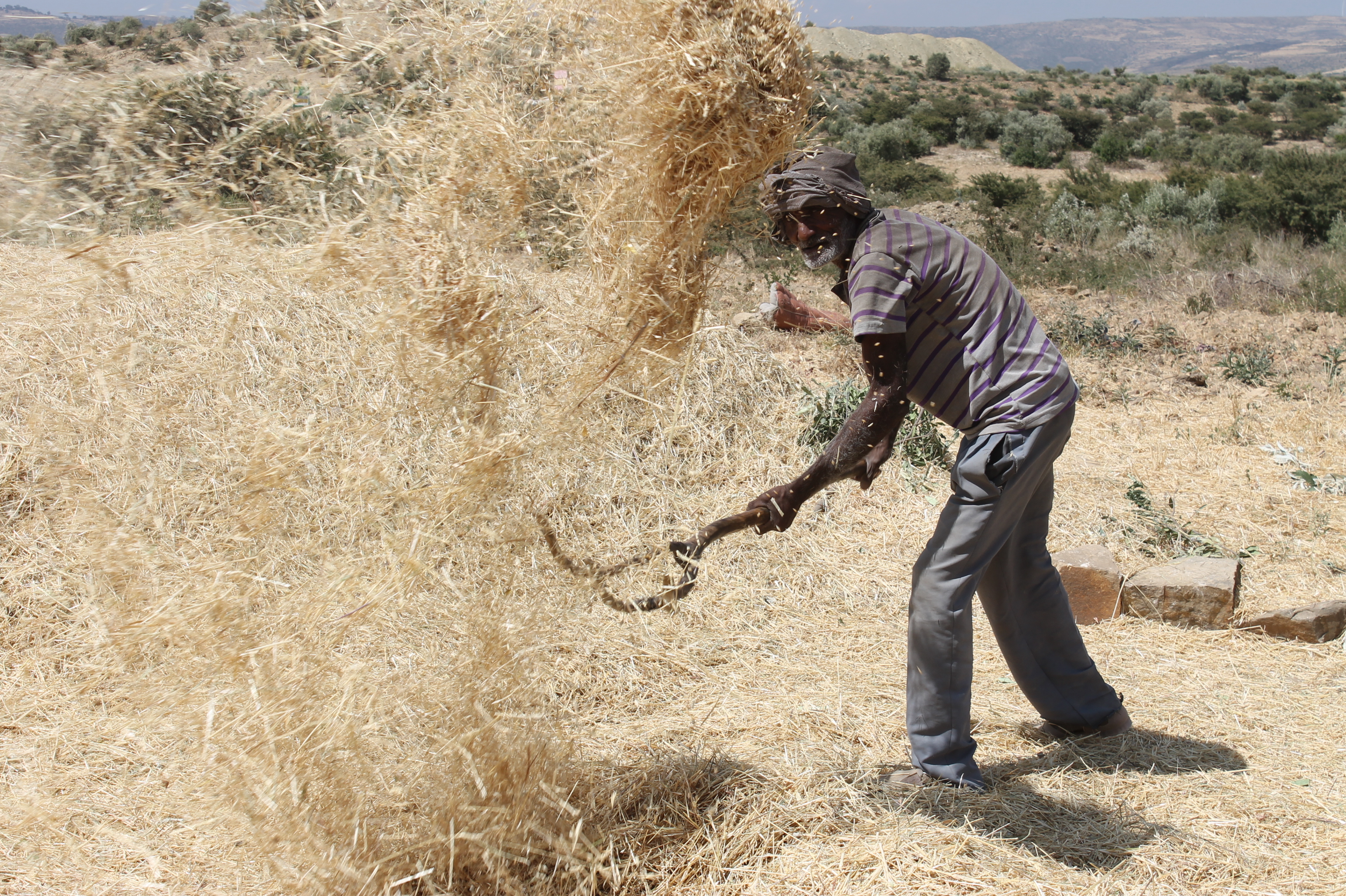
Separating wheat grain from hay in Mekele (2017)

1987–88. The food deficit estimate for the 1985–89 period indicated that production averaged about 6 million tons while demand reached about 10 million tons, thus creating an annual deficit of roughly 4 million tons. Much of the food deficit was covered through food aid. Between 1984–85 and 1986–87, at the height of the drought, Ethiopia received more than 1.7 million tons of grain, about 14 percent of the total food aid for Africa. In addition, Ethiopia spent 341 million Birr on food purchases during the 1985-87 period.

Wheat stem rust threatens the Ethiopian harvest every year and recently that especially means Ug99. Resultantly there has been significant uptake of resistant wheat varieties among Ethiopian farmers since 2014.

==== Sorghum, millet, and corn ====
Sorghum, millet, and corn are cultivated mostly in warmer areas at lower altitudes along the country's western, southwestern, and eastern peripheries. Sorghum and millet, which are drought resistant, grow well at low elevations where rainfall is less reliable. Corn is grown chiefly between elevations of 1,500 and 2,200 meters and requires large amounts of rainfall to ensure good harvests. These three grains constitute the staple foods of a good part of the population and are major items in the diet of the nomads.

==== Pulses ====
Pulses are the second most important element in the national diet and a principal protein source. They are boiled, roasted, or included in a stew-like dish known as wot, which is sometimes a main dish and sometimes a supplementary food. Pulses, grown widely at all altitudes from sea level to about 3,000 meters, are more prevalent in the northern and central highlands. Pulses were a particularly important export item before the revolution.

Major pulse crops grown in the country are chickpea, haricot beans, lentils, fababean and peas

==== Vegetable oils ====
The Ethiopian Orthodox Church traditionally has forbidden consumption of animal fats on many days of the year. As a result, vegetable oils are widely used, and oilseed cultivation is an important agricultural activity. The most important oilseed is the indigenous Niger seed (neug), which is grown on 50 percent or more of the area devoted to oilseeds. Niger seed is found mostly in the northern and central highlands at elevations between 1,800 and 2,500 meters. Flaxseed, also indigenous, is cultivated in the same general area as Niger seed. The third most important oilseed is sesame, which grows at elevations from sea level to about 1,500 meters. In addition to its domestic use, sesame is also the principal export oilseed. Oilseeds of lesser significance include castor beans, rapeseed, peanuts, and safflower and sunflower seeds. Most oilseeds are raised by small-scale farmers, but sesame was also grown by large-scale commercial farms before the era of land reform and the nationalization of agribusiness.

==== Ensete (false banana) ====
Ensete, known locally as false banana, is an important food source in Ethiopia's southern and southwestern highlands. It is cultivated principally by the Gurage, Sidama, and several other ethnic groups in the region. Resembling the banana but bearing an inedible fruit, the plant produces large quantities of starch in its underground rhizome and an above-ground stem that can reach a height of several meters. Ensete flour constitutes the staple food of the local people. Taro, yams, and sweet potatoes are commonly grown in the same region as the ensete.

==== Other fruits and vegetables ====
The consumption of vegetables and fruits is relatively limited, largely because of their high cost. Common vegetables include tomatoes, onions, peppers, squash, and a cabbage similar to kale. Demand for vegetables has stimulated truck farming around the main urban areas such as Addis Ababa and Asmera. Prior to the Revolution, urbanization increased the demand for fruit, leading to the establishment of citrus orchards in areas with access to irrigation in Shewa, Arsi, Hararghe, and Eritrea. The Mengistu regime encouraged fruit and vegetable production. Fresh fruits, including citrus and bananas, as well as fresh and frozen vegetables, became important export items, but their profitability was marginal. The Ethiopian Fruit and Vegetable Marketing Enterprise, which handled about 75 percent of Ethiopia's exports of fruits and vegetables in 1984–85, had to receive government subsidies because of losses.

In recent years there has been a steady increase in the import of professional high quality seeds varieties, from US$2M in 2011, to US$12 in 2020. Use of quality seed of improved varieties has shown great yield improvements for farmers. This increase has been in large part thanks to initiative of the Dutch and Israeli NGOs SNV and Fair Planet (respectively), as well as the local ISSD Ethiopia initiative.

=== Livestock ===
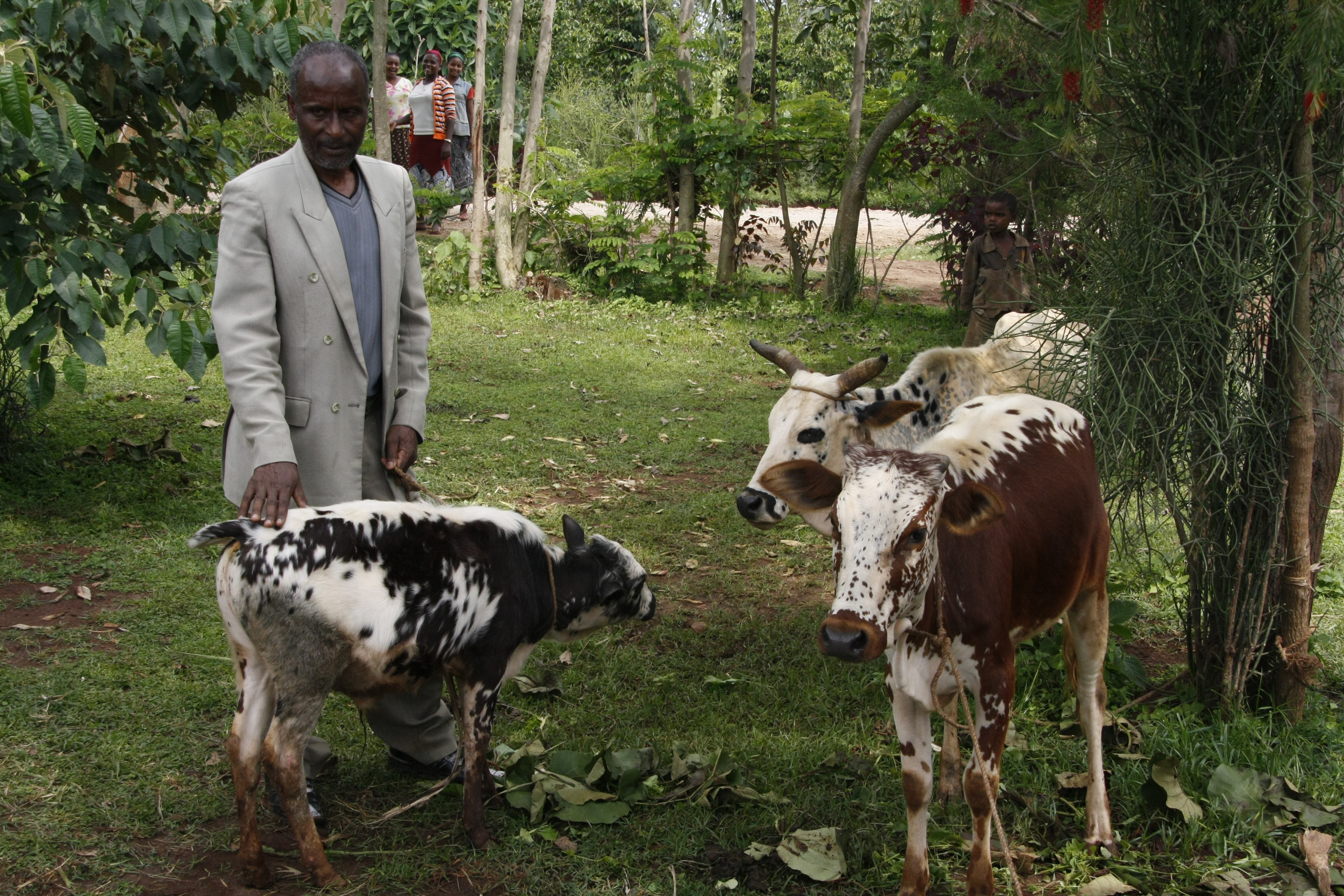
With the extra money he gets for his coffee – up nine-fold since the Ethiopia Commodity Exchange started – farmer Feleke Dukamo has been able to buy a few animals to provide milk and meat for his family (2011)

Livestock production plays an important role in Ethiopia's economy. Estimates for 1987 indicated that livestock production contributed one-third of agriculture's share of GDP, or nearly 15 percent of total GDP. In the 2006–2007 EFY hides, skins and leather products made up 7.5% of the total export value; live animals accounted for 3.1% of the total value of exports during the same period.

Although varying from region to region, the role of livestock in the Ethiopian economy was greater than the figures suggest. Almost the entire rural population was involved in some way with animal husbandry, whose role included the provision of draft power, food, cash, transportation, fuel, and, especially in pastoral areas, social prestige. In the highlands, oxen provided draft power in crop production. In pastoral areas, livestock formed the basis of the economy. Per capita meat consumption was high by developing countries' standards, an estimated thirteen kilograms annually. According to a 1987 estimate, beef accounted for about 51% of all meat consumption, followed by mutton and lamb (19%), poultry (15%), and goat (14%).

Ethiopia's estimated livestock population is often said to be the largest in Africa. It is estimated to number over 150 million in 2007–2008. Excluding the Afar and Somali Regions, there were approximately 47.5 million cattle, 26.1 million sheep, 21.7 million goats, 2.1 million horses and mules, 5.6 million donkeys, 1 million camels, and 39.6 million poultry. For the later two Regions, estimated numbers vary greatly between conventional and aerial censuses, but total less than 15% of the non-nomadic Regions. Though the raising of livestock always has been largely a subsistence activity, intensive, factory farm facilities are gaining in popularity and are present in Addis Ababa and Debre Zeit, run by Ethiopian agribusiness ELFORA.

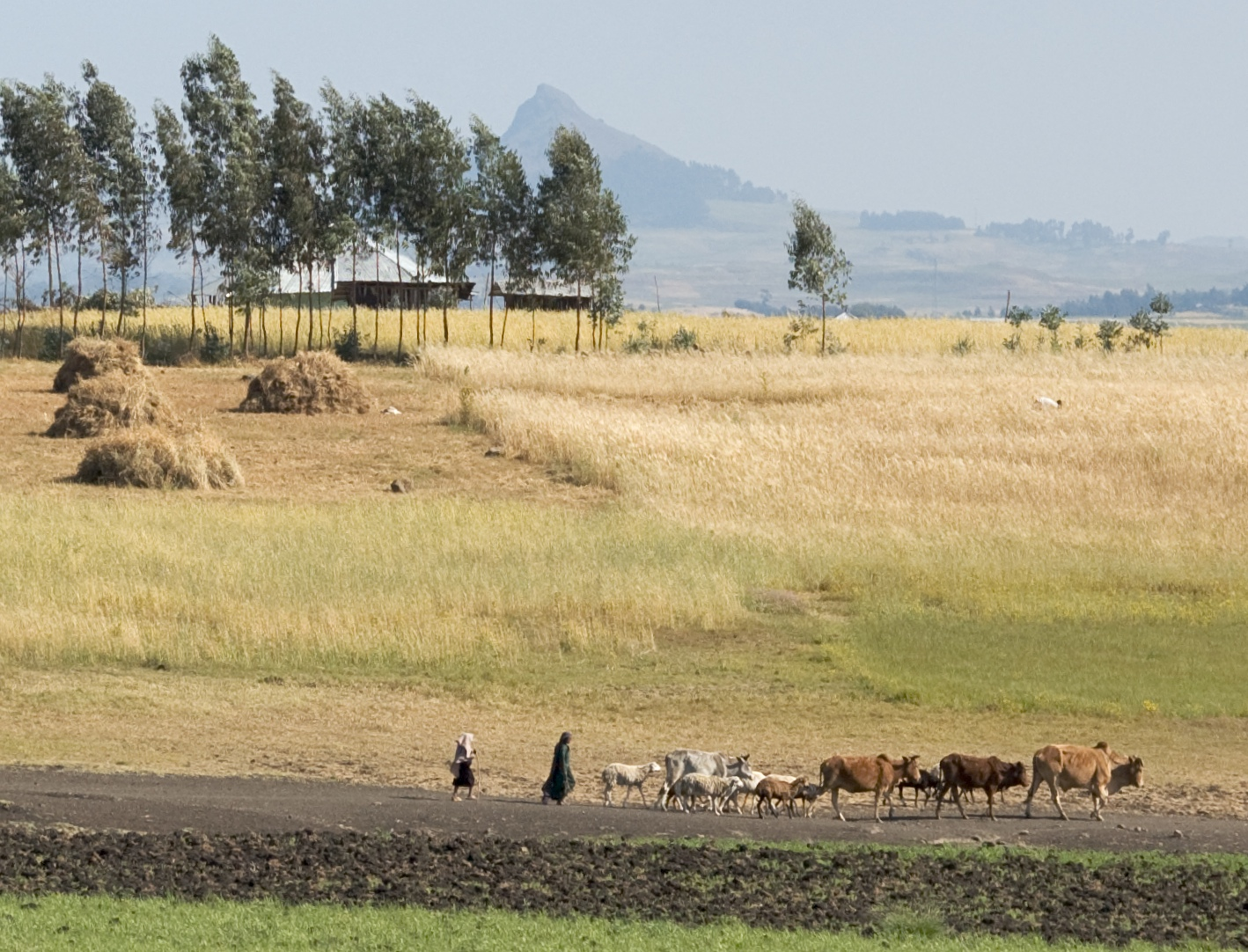
Herding livestock to market

Ethiopia has great potential for increased livestock production, both for local use and for export. However, expansion was constrained by inadequate nutrition, disease, a lack of support services such as extension services, insufficient data with which to plan improved services, and inadequate information on how to improve animal breeding, marketing, and processing. The high concentration of animals in the highlands, together with the fact that cattle are often kept for status, reduces the economic potential of Ethiopian livestock.

While efforts are being made to intensify and industrialize the sector, questions arise as to how Ethiopia can develop and expand its livestock population when Ethiopians already struggle to gain access to good soil, grazing land, and water. As Ethiopia increasingly experiences the effects of climate change, drought, and desertification, experts predict that "Ethiopia will have to open its markets to grain imports in order to keep up with the growing demand for meat, milk, and eggs.".

Both the imperial and the Marxist governments tried to improve livestock production by instituting programs such as free vaccination, well-digging, construction of feeder roads, and improvement of pastureland, largely through international organizations such as the World Bank and the African Development Bank. During Derg rule, veterinary stations were opened at Bahir Dar, Bedele, and Bishoftu to provide treatment and vaccination services.

Cattle in Ethiopia are almost entirely of the zebu type and are poor sources of milk and meat. However, these cattle do relatively well under the traditional production system. About 70 percent of the cattle in 1987 were in the highlands (commonly involved in transhumance), and the remaining 30 percent were kept by nomadic pastoralists in the lowland areas. Meat and milk yields are low and losses high, especially among calves and young stock. Contagious diseases and parasitic infections are major causes of death, factors that are exacerbated by malnutrition and starvation. Recurring drought takes a heavy toll on the animal population, although it is difficult to determine the extent of losses. Practically all animals are range-fed. During the rainy seasons, water and grass are generally plentiful, but with the onset of the dry season, forage is generally insufficient to keep animals nourished and able to resist disease.

Most of Ethiopia's estimated 48 million sheep and goats are raised by small farmers who used them as a major source of meat and cash income. About three-quarters of the total sheep flock is in the highlands, whereas lowland pastoralists maintain about three-quarters of the goat herd. Both animals have high sales value in urban centers, particularly during holidays such as Easter and New Year's Day.

Most of the estimated 7.5 million equines (horses, mules, and donkeys) are used to transport produce and other agricultural goods. Camels also play a key role as pack animals in areas below 1,500 meters in elevation. Additionally, camels provide pastoralists in those areas with milk and meat.

Poultry farming is widely practiced in Ethiopia; almost every farmstead keeps some poultry for consumption and for cash sale. The highest concentration of poultry is in Shewa, in central Wollo, and in northwestern Tigray. Individual poultry farms supply eggs and meat to urban dwellers. By 1990 the state had begun to develop large poultry farms, mostly around Addis Ababa, to supply hotels and government institutions. Multinational agribusinesses supply these industrial poultry farms with high yielding breeds, such as Rhode Island Reds and White Leghorns.

However, herding cattle is one of the agricultural activities that resorts to indentured labor and particularly child labor according to the U.S. Department of Labor. With 22% of children aged 5 to 14 working in the informal sector, the Department reported that "government efforts to address child labor have not sufficiently targeted sectors with a high incidence of child labor", and cattle herding still figures among the goods listed in the DOL's List of Goods Produced by Child Labor or Forced Labor published in December 2014. Researchers found however that, since transhumance takes place in summer, during school holidays, the transhumance in itself does not affect schooling. Young herders take their text books of the upcoming school year to the grazing grounds. Among the popular games on the grasslands, football (introduced via schools) tends to replace the traditional qarsa game. Furthermore, cropping has become more intensive and needs more labour; the establishment of exclosures and the expansion of cropland have led to less grazing grounds. Hence, fewer people send their cattle in transhumance.

== Traditional farming tools in Ethiopia ==
Almost all farming tools in Ethiopia are traditional and made from different types of wood. These tools includes sickle, pick axe, plough shaft, ploughshare, plow, beam and animal force as a machines. The plough shaft, beam and ploughshare are made of wood and the sickle, pick axe, plow are made of metal. Ploughing the land using these tools is ambiguous and time-consuming.

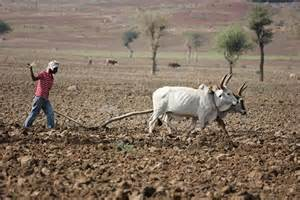
Plough tool

According to Ethiopia farming, this ploughing the land to prepare the soil for sow requires around two quarter of a year. ploughing the land to soften the land takes three months and from sowing and seedling to the harvesting of the crops requires three to four months. Ethiopian farmers plough their land by combining the above tools for such three months to get yearly consumed food. The major product in are teff, wheat, maize, sesame, Niger, linseed etc. in addition to these cereals, they produce different types of fruits and coffee which are not seasonal.

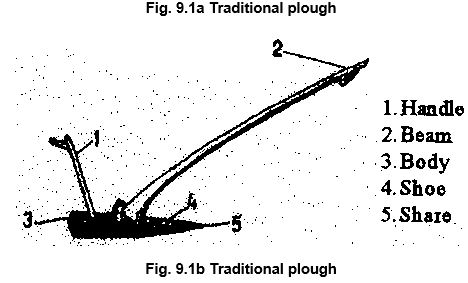
Traditional farm tool

== Government marketing operations ==
Private traders and the Agricultural Marketing Corporation (AMC), established in 1976, marketed Ethiopia's agricultural output. The AMC was a government agency whose objective was to influence the supply and price of crops. It purchased grain from peasant associations at fixed prices. The AMC set quotas of grain purchases to be delivered by peasant associations and cooperatives and also bought from private wholesalers, who were required to sell half of their purchases at predetermined prices. State farms sold their output to the AMC.

Although the AMC had agents in all regions, it was particularly active in the major cereal producing regions, namely, Gojjam, Shewa, Arsi, and Gondar. In 1981–82, out of the AMC's purchases of 257,000 tons of grain, Gojjam accounted for 32 percent of the purchases, and Arsi, Shewa, and Gonder accounted for 23%, 22%, and 10%, respectively. The government's price controls and the AMC's operations had led to the development of different price systems at various levels.

For instance, the 1984–85 official procurement price for 100 kilograms of teff was 42 birr at the farm level and 60 birr when the AMC purchased it from wholesalers. But the same quantity of teff retailed at 81 birr at food stores belonging to the urban dwellers' associations (kebeles) in Addis Ababa and sold for as much as 181 birr in the open market. Such wide price variations created food shortages because farmers as well as private merchants withheld crops to sell on the black market at higher prices.

== See also ==
- Deforestation in Ethiopia
- Economy of Ethiopia
- Fishing in Ethiopia
- Forestry in Ethiopia
- Ministry of Agriculture (Ethiopia)
