= List of ecoregions in Ethiopia =

The following is a list of ecoregions in Ethiopia, as identified by the Worldwide Fund for Nature (WWF).

== Terrestrial ecoregions ==
by major habitat type

=== Tropical and subtropical moist broadleaf forests ===
- Ethiopian montane forests

=== Tropical and subtropical grasslands, savannas, and shrublands ===
- East Sudanian savanna
- Northern Acacia–Commiphora bushlands and thickets
- Sahelian Acacia savanna
- Somali Acacia–Commiphora bushlands and thickets
- Victoria Basin forest–savanna mosaic

=== Montane grasslands and shrublands ===
- Ethiopian montane grasslands and woodlands
- Ethiopian montane moorlands

=== Deserts and xeric shrublands ===
- Ethiopian xeric grasslands and shrublands
- Masai xeric grasslands and shrublands

== Freshwater ecoregions ==
- Ethiopian Highlands
- Lake Tana
- Northern Eastern Rift
- Lake Turkana
- Shebelle-Juba
- Upper Nile
- Lower Nile
- Western Red Sea Drainages
