= Abaya (woreda) =

District in Oromia Region, Ethiopia

Abaya Abaya (Oromo)
- Woreda
- Interactive map of Abaya
- Location within Ethiopia
- Coordinates: 6°10′00″N 38°00′00″E
- Country: Ethiopia
- Region: Oromia
- Zone: West Hararghe

Population (2007 est.)
  - Total: 103,348

Abaya is a woreda in the Oromia Region, Ethiopia. It is part of former Gelana Abaya woreda what was divided for Abaya and Gelana woredas. Part of the Borena Zone, Gelana Abaya was bordered on the south by Hagere Mariam, and on the west, north and east by the Southern Nations, Nationalities, and Peoples Region (SNNPR). Lake Abaya, on the western border, is divided between this woreda and the SNNPR. However, the Guji Oromo who live in Nechisar National Park are claimed to be administratively part of this woreda, in a kebele called "Irgansaa".

== Overview ==
The altitude of this woreda ranges from 800 to 2300 meters above sea level. Perennial rivers include the Gelana and Gildabo. A survey of the land in this woreda shows that 41% is arable (28.7% was under annual crops), 35% pasture, 15% forest, and the remaining 9% is considered swampy, degraded or otherwise unusable. The four major crops grown in this woreda are maize, wheat, barley and haricot beans in that order, with some long cycle sorghum and teff as well; in some parts ensete or the false banana is also grown, which offers a degree of security during famines. Coffee is an important cash crop; over 5,000 hectares are planted with it.

Industry in the woreda includes 2 coffee pulpers, and a number of traders; deposits of ignimbrite and basalt are known but have not been commercially developed. There were 32 Farmers Associations with 5,643 members and 4 Farmers Service Cooperatives. Gelana Abaya has 67 kilometers of dry-weather and 19 all-weather road, for an average road density of 36.4 kilometers per 1000 square kilometers. About 21.6% of the total population has access to drinking water.

== History ==
Early western explorers who travelled through what currently is the territory of this woreda include the Italians Eugene Ruspoli (died 1891) and Vittorio Bottego, and the American Arthur Donaldson Smith.

In the last years of the military regime some parts of the Sidamo Province inhabited by the Guji Oromo were included in the Gedeo sub-province, while the larger portion of the Guji territories remained in Borana sub-province. This restructuring was preserved during the Transitional Government, making this woreda a part of the Gedeo Zone of the SNNPR. The local Guji Oromo, who felt dominated by the Gedeo people, were dissatisfied with this arrangement, and who appealed to the office of the then Prime Minister but in vain, until the adoption of the new constitution, when a plebiscite was arranged to reallocate the woredas. Although Gelana Abaya became a part of the Oromia Zone, it was only after violent clashes broke out in the Hagere Mariam woreda between the Guji and Gedeo in April–May 1995. The federal army attempted to intervene between the two to stop the fighting, but only succeeded in becoming the target of Guji militants.

Gelana Abaya was selected by the Ministry of Agriculture and Rural Development in 2004 as an area for voluntary resettlement for farmers from overpopulated areas. That year this woreda became the home for a total of 9145 heads of households and 45,725 total family members.

In early 2005, around 6,000 people were displaced by heavy flooding in Gelana; Hagere Mariam was also affected by the flooding to a lesser degree.

== Demographics ==
The 2007 national census reported a total population for this woreda of 103,348, of whom 52,015 were men and 51,333 were women; 4,570 or 4.42% of its population were urban dwellers. The majority of the inhabitants said they were Protestant, with 62.75% of the population reporting they observed these beliefs, while 17.05% of the population practiced traditional beliefs, 11.89% practiced Ethiopian Orthodox Christianity and 2.3% were Catholic.

Based on figures published by the Central Statistical Agency in 2005, this woreda has an estimated total population of 152,161, of whom 75,042 are men and 77,119 are women. With an estimated area of 2,365.16 square kilometers, Gelana Abaya has an estimated population density of 64.3 people per square kilometer, which is greater than the Zone average of 21.1.

The 1994 national census reported a total population for this woreda of 110,762, of whom 56,489 were men and 54,273 women; the census reported no urban dwellers. The three largest ethnic groups reported in Gelana Abaya were the Oromo (74.49%), the Gedeo (23.47%), and the Amhara (1.18%); all other ethnic groups made up 0.86% of the population. Oromiffa was spoken as a first language by 75.86%, 22.64% spoke Gedeo and 1.18% spoke Amharic; the remaining 0.32% spoke all other primary languages reported. The plurality of the inhabitants practiced traditional beliefs, with 44.38% of the population giving answers that were recorded under that label, while 34.19% of the population said they were Protestant, 11.55% professed Ethiopian Orthodox Christianity, and 2.24% were Catholic.
