= Dilla =

Dilla may refer to:

- Dilla, Ethiopia, a city in Ethiopia
  - Dilla University, in the above city
- Dilla District, a district of Somaliland
  - Dilla, Awdal, capital city of the above
- Dilla (slang), a slang term used in surfing
- J Dilla (1974–2006), an American hip hop producer

== See also ==
- Dila (disambiguation)
