= Abaya (disambiguation) =

The abaya is an arabic dress.

Abaya may also refer to:

- Abaya (surname)
- Lake Abaya, a lake in Ethiopia
- Abaya (woreda), in Ethiopia
- Abala Abaya, a woreda in Wolayita Zone of Ethiopia
