= Gedeo =

Gedeo is the name of

- Gedeo people, an ethnic group in Ethiopia
- Gedeo language, the language spoken by the Gedeo
- Gedeo Zone, an administrative zone of Ethiopia.
