= Kochere =

Coordinates: 6°00′N 38°15′E

Kochere is one of the woredas in the Southern Nations, Nationalities, and Peoples' Region of Ethiopia. Part of the Gedeo Zone, Kochere is bordered on the east by Gedeb, on the southwest by the Oromia Region, and on the north by Yirgachefe. Towns in Kochere include Fisehagenet and Chelelektu. Gedeb woreda was separated from Kochere.

According to a 2004 report, Kochere had 34 kilometers of asphalt road, 13 kilometers of all-weather roads and 18 kilometers of dry-weather roads, for an average road density of 129 kilometers per 1000 square kilometers.

== Demographics ==
Based on the 2007 Census conducted by the CSA, this woreda has a total population of 130,486, of whom 64,703 are men and 65,783 women; 10,606 or 8.13% of its population are urban dwellers. The majority of the inhabitants were Protestants, with 78.25% of the population reporting that belief, 8.04% practiced Ethiopian Orthodox Christianity, 7.33% observed traditional religions, 1.72% were Catholic, and 1.36% were Muslim.

In the 1994 Census this woreda had a population of 160,246, of whom 79,807 were men and 80,439 women; 11,265 or 7.03% of its population were urban dwellers. The three largest ethnic groups reported in Kochere were the Gedeo (84.05%), the Oromo (11.35%), and the Amhara (2.62%); all other ethnic groups made up 1.98% of the population. Gedeo is spoken as a first language by 84.93%, 10.74% spoke Oromiffa, and 3.77% spoke Amharic; the remaining 0.56% spoke all other primary languages reported. 47.57% of the population said they were Protestants, 26.05% observed traditional religions, 16.45% practiced Ethiopian Orthodox Christianity, 3.21% were Catholic and 1.51% were Muslim.
