= Wenago =

Coordinates: 6°20′N 38°20′E

Wenago is one of the woredas in the Southern Nations, Nationalities, and Peoples' Region of Ethiopia. Part of the Gedeo Zone, Wenago is bordered on the southwest by Yirgachefe, on the northwest by the Oromia Region, on the northeast by Dila Zuria, and on the southeast by Bule. Towns in Wenago include Wenago. Dila Zuria woreda and Dila town were separated from Wenago.

According to a 2004 report, Wenago had 12 kilometers of asphalt roads, 56 kilometers of all-weather roads and 17 kilometers of dry-weather roads, for an average road density of 333 kilometers per 1000 square kilometers. Local landmarks include the Qallu compound (galma) of the Guji Oromo, which that group claims ought to be annexed to the Guji Zone of the Oromia Region, a claim which has led to violence in the past.

== Demographics ==
Based on the 2007 Census conducted by the CSA, this woreda has a total population of 116,921, of whom 58,150 are men and 58,771 women; 8,471 or 7.25% of its population are urban dwellers. The majority of the inhabitants were Protestants, with 76.11% of the population reporting that belief, 9.29% observed traditional religions, 8.55% practiced Ethiopian Orthodox Christianity, and 1.71% were Catholic.

In the 1994 Census this woreda had a population of 185,676, of whom 93,300 were men and 92,376 women; 38,794 or 20.89% of its population were urban dwellers. The five largest ethnic groups reported in Wenago were the Gedeo (73.5%), the Amhara (6.98%), the Oromo (6.37%), the Sidama (3.34%), and the Silte (2.33%); all other ethnic groups made up 7.48% of the population. Gedeo was spoken as a first language by 73.22%, 13.5% spoke Amharic, 5.43% spoke Oromiffa, 3.25% spoke Sidamo and 1.39% spoke Silte; the remaining 3.21% spoke all other primary languages reported. The largest religious group was the Protestants, with 45.92% of the population holding that belief, while 26.06% practiced Ethiopian Orthodox Christianity, 16.96% observed traditional religions, 4.66% were Muslim, and 2.56% were Catholic.
