= Dila District =

Dila District may refer to:

- Dila District, Somalia
- Dila District, Afghanistan
