= Dila =

Dila may refer to:

- Dila District, Afghanistan, in Paktika Province
  - Dila, Afghanistan, capital of the above
- Dila (month), the ninth month in the Nepal Era calendar
- Dila, a barangay in Calaca, Batangas, Philippines
- Dila, a barangay in Santa Rosa, Laguna, Philippines
- Dila, a spirit in Philippine mythology

== See also ==
- Zawiya Dila'iya, founded in the 16th century by the Berbers of the Middle-Atlas, which came to rule the entire northern part of Morocco from 1640 until 1666
- D-ILA, a display technology derived from LCOS
- Dilla (disambiguation)
