= Kulfo River =

Location
- Country: Ethiopia

Physical characteristics
- Mouth
  - location: Lake Chamo
  - coordinates: 5.927°N 37.552°E
  - elevation: 1,109 m (3,638 ft)

The Kulfo River is a river in southern Ethiopia that rises in the western escarpment of the Main Ethiopian Rift in the Guge mountains.

It flows through Arba Minch and then through the Nechisar National Park on the isthmus between Lake Chamo and Lake Abaya. It usually drains into Lake Chamo but can also drain into Lake Abaya after heavy rains through a bifurcation located directly southwest of Arba Minch Airport.

The lower reaches of the Kulfo River act as the spillway for Lake Abaya into Lake Chamo in case of high lake levels. The overflow point is directly below an alluvial fan at an elevation of 1,190 m (at 6.0109°N 37.5854°E). The riverbed then discharges the excess lake water into Lake Chamo.

An important bridge over the river was restored in 2006. The river has dried out considerably in recent years.

== Characteristics ==
It is a braided river, with a catchment area of 300 km^{3}. It is 20 meters wide near its mouth, with a slope gradient of 10 m/km. The average diameter of the bed material is 14 mm (gravel).

== Sediment transport ==
The river transports 53,480 tonnes of bedload and 327,230 tonnes of suspended sediment annually to Lake Chamo.

== Tropical insects ==
Cytotaxonomic analysis of larval chromosomes from the Kulfo River area has revealed the existence of two newly recognized species of Black flies in the river, Simulium kulfoense and S. soderense; yet unlike other Black flies these species are not carriers of Onchocerca volvulus.

== See also ==
- List of Ethiopian rivers
