= Bule (woreda) =

Coordinates: 6°15′N 38°20′E

Bule is one of the woredas in the South Ethiopia Regional State of Ethiopia, named after its major town, Bule. Part of the Gedeo Zone, Bule is bordered on the south by Gedeb, on the southwest by Yirgachefe, on the west by Wenago, on the northwest by Dila Zuria, on the north by the Sidama Zone, and on the east by the Oromia Region.

Most of the woreda is considered highland; the highest point is at Haro Wolabu Pond (2993 meters). According to a 2004 report, Bule had 24 km of all-weather roads and no dry-weather roads, for an average road density of 89 km per 1000 square km.

== Demographics ==
Based on the 2007 Census conducted by the CSA, this woreda has a total population of 105,192, of whom 52,910 are men and 52,282 women; 5,505 or 5.23% of its population are urban dwellers. The majority of the inhabitants were Protestants, with 71.23% of the population reporting that belief, 15.38% observed traditional religions, 7.49% practiced Ethiopian Orthodox Christianity, 1.43% were Muslim, and 1.29% were Catholic.

In the 1994 Census this woreda had a population of 80,779, of whom 40,685 were men and 40,094 women; 3,736 or 4.62% of its population were urban dwellers. The three largest ethnic groups reported in Bule were the Gedeo (93.11%), the Amhara (3.21%), and the Oromo (2.46%); all other ethnic groups made up 1.22% of the population. Gedeo was spoken as a first language by 93.2%, 3.29% spoke Amharic, and 3.25% spoke Oromiffa; the remaining 0.26% spoke all other primary languages reported. The largest group of inhabitants observed traditional religions, with 34.14% of the population having reported they practiced beliefs that were grouped in that category, while 34.07% were Protestants, 19.93% practiced Ethiopian Orthodox Christianity, and 1.62% were Muslim.
