= Gedeo Cultural Landscape =

World Heritage Site in Ethiopia

UNESCO World Heritage Site
- Location within Ethiopia
- Location: Ethiopia
- Criteria: Cultural: (iii)(v)
- Reference: 1641
- Inscription: 2023 (45th Session)
- Area: 29,620 ha (114.4 sq mi)
- Coordinates: 6°14′56″N 38°17′16″E

The Gedeo Cultural Landscape is a region of the Gedeo Zone, part of the South Ethiopia Regional State in south-central Ethiopia. It stretches across the eastern flank of the Main Ethiopian Rift, ranging from 1,307 to 3,072 metres (4,288 to 10,079 ft) above sea level. The region is home to roughly 2,550,000 Gedeo people. Dotted with sacred forests and megalithic monuments, the region has been the homeland of the Gedeo people for thousands of years. Traditional agroforestry is practiced in the region by the Gedeo people. Because of these traditional practices, its long history of occupation, and the cultural importance of the region, the Gedeo Cultural Landscape was inscribed on the UNESCO World Heritage List in 2023.

== History ==
The Gedeo region has been occupied for millennia; evidence of occupation dates back to the Neolithic period. Thousands of stone monuments (stelae) across roughly 100 sites have been recorded across the landscape. The largest of the stelae measure about 8 meters high and 1 meter in diameter, and they depict anthropomorphic and phallic images. Several burial sites and a necropolis have also been found, and engraved petroglyphs are common.

The first European archeological surveys of the area were conducted in the 1920s and 1930s.

== Agroforestry ==
Volcanism during the Miocene and Quaternary periods and the many alluvial rivers make the region very fertile. More than 90% of the land area of Gedeo Zone is covered in agroforestry, with enset and coffee being the main agricultural products. The farms are vertically stratified, with the enset and coffee plants grown underneath mature native trees. Root vegetables like cassava and legumes are grown underneath the main cash crops. To avoid the negative effects of erosion on the step landscape, almost no tilling is employed, and the farms often rotate where they farm, allowing some areas to remain fallow.

The cultural knowledge of how to manage and conserve the agroforestry system stems from the customs and beliefs of the Gedeo people, leading to a mutualistic human-environmental relationship. The area contains several sacred forests from which harvest is prohibited.

Fifty different species of native woody plants have been found within these traditional farms, 22 of which are of particular conservation concern. The most common native plants are Millettia and Cordia africana, and the African cherry also grows within these forests.
