= Amaro Mountains =

Mountain range in Ethiopia

Coordinates: 5°50′N 36°38′E

The Amaro Mountains are a mountain range in south western Ethiopia. Extending 60 kilometers along a north–south axis east of Lake Chamo, these mountains are located in the Nechisar National Park, which lies in the Amaro special woreda. These elevations expose an assemblage of uniform, fine-grained, holocrystalline olivine-basalts with local tuff bands, resting upon the basement complex. It is uncertain whether these mountains are a remnant plateau now looking down on the grabens to either side (the Gelana and Ganjule grabens), or if these mountains were squeezed up from the basement of the East African Rift, possibly by processes similar to those that formed the Ruwenzori Mountains.

Notable peaks in this mountain range include Mount Delo (3600 metres) and Mount Tabala (1650 metres). Tabala is known for its hot springs. Vittorio Bottego reached the top of the Amaro mountains on 23 March 1896, then visited Prince Eugene Ruspoli's grave before travelling on to Lake Abaya, which they named after Queen Margherita. The name "Amara" was used by Arthur Donaldson Smith when he wrote about his explorations in 1897, and Vannutelli (travelled here in 1899) called them the "Amarr". Early travelers who visited the range describe the higher summits as bare open downs, easy of access, with bamboo forests below. There is little mountaineering interest.
