= Yirgachefe (woreda) =

District in Ethiopia

Coordinates: 6°10′N 38°15′E

Yirgachefe (also transliterated Irgachefe) is a district in Ethiopia. It is one of the woredas in the South Ethiopia Region of the country, named after its major town Yirgachefe. Part of the Gedeo Zone, Yirgachefe is bordered on the south by Kochere, on the west by the Oromia Zone, on the north by Wonago, on the east by Bule, and on the southeast by Gedeb.

== Overview ==
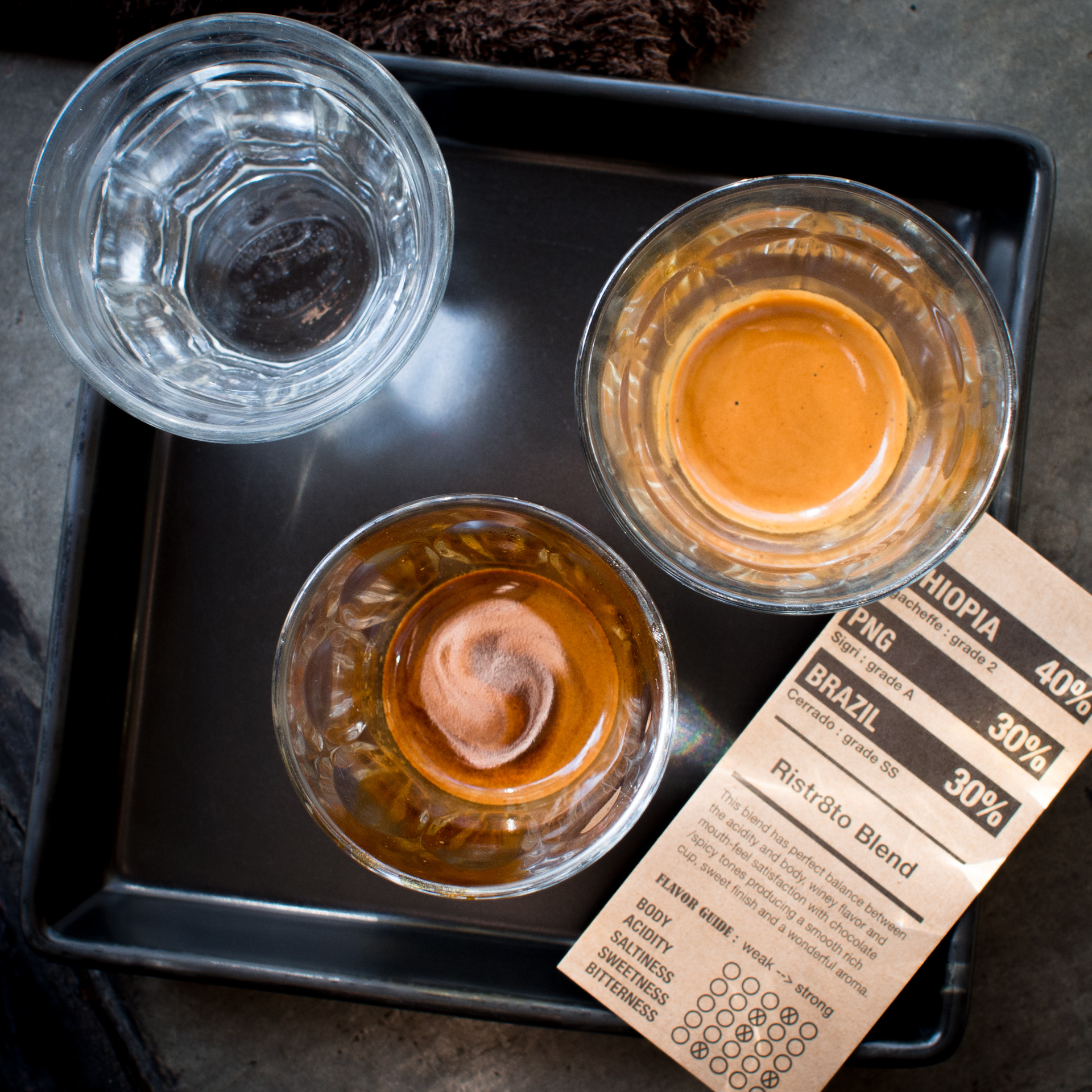
A "doppio ristretto" in Chiang Mai, Thailand, that contains coffee beans from Yirgachefe

According to a 2004 report, Yirgachefe had 19 km (12 mi) of asphalt roads, 56 km (35 mi) of all-weather roads and 8 km (5.0 mi) of dry-weather roads, for an average road density of 276 km (171 mi) per 1,000 km^{2} (390 sq mi).

Coffee is an important cash crop; Esayas Kebede, head of coffee development at the Ethiopian Ministry of Agriculture and Rural Development reported over 600 square kilometers were planted with it in the 2007/2008 season, and expected to produce 30,000 tonnes of coffee beans.

== Demographics ==
Based on the 2007 Census conducted by the CSA, this woreda has a total population of 195,256, of whom 97,385 are men and 97,871 women; 15,118 or 7.74% of its population are urban dwellers. The majority of the inhabitants were Protestants, with 66.71% of the population reporting that belief, 14.03% practiced Ethiopian Orthodox Christianity, 7.42% observed traditional religions, 3.49% were Catholic, and 2.12% were Muslim.

In the 1994 Census this woreda had a population of 137,372, of whom 68,803 were men and 68,569 women; 11,579 or 8.43% of its population were urban dwellers. The three largest ethnic groups reported in Yirgachefe were the Gedeo (81.34%), the Oromo (10.89%), the Amhara (3.48%), the Gurage (2.2%), and the Silte (0.73%); all other ethnic groups made up 1.36% of the population. Gedeo was spoken as a first language by 81.6%, 10.2% spoke Oromiffa, and 6.78% spoke Amharic; the remaining 1.42% spoke all other primary languages reported. 39.96% of the population said they were Protestants, 27.49% observed traditional religions, 24.6% practiced Ethiopian Orthodox Christianity, 3.75% were Catholics, and 2.39% were Muslim.
