= Chamo =

Chamo may refer to:

- Han'gŭl letters (Korean: 자모; Hanja: 字母; RR: Jamo; MR: Chamo)
- Mauricio Sanchez, the Venezuelan actor
- Lake Chamo, Ethiopia
