= Gelana =

Administrative district of Ethiopia

Gelana is one of the woredas in the Oromia Region of Ethiopia. It was part of former Gelana Abaya woreda. It is part of the Borena Zone. The administrative center of Gelana is Tore.

== Demographics ==
The 2007 national census reported a total population for this woreda of 71,369, of whom 36,032 were men and 35,337 were women; 3,502 or 4.91% of its population were urban dwellers. The majority of the inhabitants said they were Protestant, with 76.47% of the population reporting they observed these beliefs, while 16.28% of the population practiced traditional beliefs, 4.09% practiced Ethiopian Orthodox Christianity and 1.72% were Muslim.
