= Arba Minch =

City in South Ethiopia Regional State, Ethiopia

Arba Minch (Ganta Garo) አርባ ምንጭ
- City
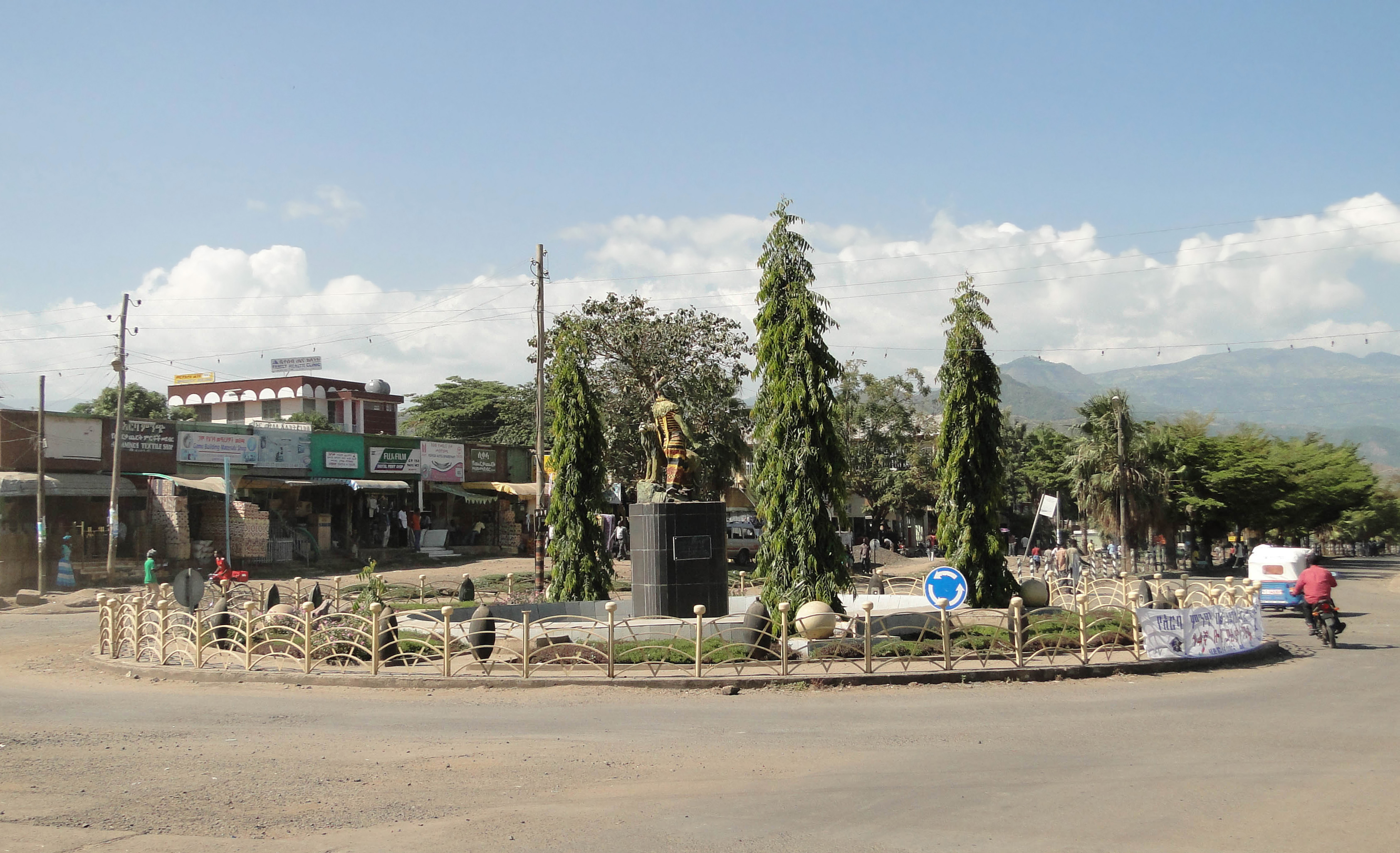
- A monument in Arba Minch

- Location within Ethiopia
- Coordinates: 6°2′N 37°33′E
- Country: Ethiopia
- Region: South Ethiopia Regional State
- Zone: Gamo Zone
- Elevation: 1,285 m (4,216 ft)

Population (2007)
  - Total: 74,879
  - Estimate (2021): 192,043
- Time zone: UTC+3 (EAT)
  - Summer (DST): UTC+3
- Climate: Aw

Arba Minch (Ganta Garo) is a city and separate woreda in the southern part of Ethiopia. "Arba Minch" means "40 Springs", originated from the presence of more than 40 springs. It is located in the Gamo Zone of the South Ethiopia Regional State, about 500 kilometers south of Addis Ababa, at an elevation of 1285 meters above sea level. It is the largest town in Gamo Zone. It is surrounded by Arba Minch Zuria woreda.

== Overview ==
Arba Minch received its name for the abundant local springs which produce a groundwater forest. Located at the base of the western side of the Great Rift Valley, Arba Minch consists of the uptown administrative centre of Shecha and 4 kilometers away the downtown commercial and residential areas of Sikela, which are connected by a paved road. On the eastern side of Sikela is the gate to Nechisar National Park, which covers the isthmus between Lake Abaya to the north and Lake Chamo to the south. Buses and taxis connect the uptown and downtown parts; both parts have schools. Kulfo River flows through the town, and drains into Lake Chamo.

== History ==
Arba Minch (Ganta Garo) was founded in the early 1960s by the Fitawrari Alemayehu Arshe and the city succeeded Chencha as the provincial capital city of Gamu-Gofa. The word "Ganta Garo" mean the place in which Ganta people, animals, etc. live plentily (abundantly). The oral tradition has it that Fitawrari Aemiro Selassie Abebe had to fight with prominent figures of Chencha to move the capital to Arba Minch. One of the reasons for the move was for travelers from Gidole to Chencha to take a break after a long, hot crossing of the arid Rift Valley area.

Roads were built linking the new town to Soddo and making Arba Minch only a day's journey by road to the capital, Addis Ababa. A telephone line connecting the town to the capital, costing E$ 250,000, was turned up on 15 July 1967.

Arba Minch had previously served as a capital city for Gamo Gofa Province (Gamo Gofa Teklay Gizat), North Omo Zone (Semen Omo), Kilil 9 (Region 9), Gamo Gofa Zone, and now is serving as a capital city of Gamo Zone.

The Norwegian Lutheran Mission opened a station at Arba Minch in 1970, which included a trade school; the school's operation was later taken over by the Mekane Yesus Church. At the beginning of the Ethiopian Revolution public demonstrations occurred in the town, and four people were killed in clashes with the police on 28 March 1974. Following the revolution privately held plantations were made into state farms.

The 193 million birr Arba Minch Textile Mill was opened on 6 May 1992 in the presence of Ethiopian Prime Minister Tamirat Layne. The mill would produce polyester mixed with cotton grey fabrics. According to the SNNPR's Bureau of Finance and Economic Development, as of 2003 other amenities in Arba Minch include postal service, 24-hour electrical service, a bank and a hospital. In May 2010, the Ethiopian Roads Authority awarded a contract worth 563 million E$ to the construction firm of Brehane Hagos to build a road 60 kilometers in length from this town to Belta. The United States military operated a facility at Arba Minch from 2011 until September 2015. The facility served as the base for several General Atomics MQ-9 Reaper unmanned aerial vehicles.

== Demographics ==
Based on the 2007 Census conducted by the CSA, this town has a total population of 74,879, of whom 39,208 were male and 35,671 female. The majority of the inhabitants practiced Ethiopian Orthodox Christianity, with 56.04% of the population reporting that belief, 38.47% were Protestants, and 4.16% were Muslim.

The 1994 national census reported this town had a total population of 40,020 of whom 20,096 were males and 19,924 were females.

== Climate ==
Climate data for Arba Minch
Month	Jan	Feb	Mar	Apr	May	Jun	Jul	Aug	Sep	Oct	Nov	Dec	Year
Record high °C (°F)	36.0 (96.8)	37.7 (99.9)	38.5 (101.3)	38.8 (101.8)	35.2 (95.4)	34.0 (93.2)	33.0 (91.4)	33.8 (92.8)	36.0 (96.8)	35.0 (95.0)	36.0 (96.8)	37.5 (99.5)	38.8 (101.8)
Mean daily maximum °C (°F)	32.0 (89.6)	33.2 (91.8)	33.2 (91.8)	30.9 (87.6)	29.0 (84.2)	28.3 (82.9)	27.7 (81.9)	28.7 (83.7)	30.2 (86.4)	29.9 (85.8)	30.7 (87.3)	31.3 (88.3)	30.4 (86.8)
Mean daily minimum °C (°F)	16.2 (61.2)	17.0 (62.6)	18.3 (64.9)	18.2 (64.8)	18.1 (64.6)	17.9 (64.2)	17.8 (64.0)	18.1 (64.6)	17.9 (64.2)	17.4 (63.3)	15.9 (60.6)	15.4 (59.7)	17.4 (63.2)
Record low °C (°F)	9.1 (48.4)	8.4 (47.1)	9.7 (49.5)	8.3 (46.9)	8.0 (46.4)	12.0 (53.6)	12.8 (55.0)	12.3 (54.1)	11.9 (53.4)	11.4 (52.5)	9.5 (49.1)	1.3 (34.3)	1.3 (34.3)
Average precipitation mm (inches)	34.1 (1.34)	39.4 (1.55)	56.0 (2.20)	165.6 (6.52)	147.2 (5.80)	63.5 (2.50)	43.3 (1.70)	48.0 (1.89)	83.8 (3.30)	119.4 (4.70)	60.3 (2.37)	42.3 (1.67)	902.9 (35.54)
Average relative humidity (%)	48	50	54	62	67	63	62	59	62	61	57	48	58
Source 1: Ethiopian Meteorological Institute
Source 2: FAO (humidity)

== Transportation ==
- Arba Minch Airport with commercial flights to/from Addis Ababa
