= Dila Zuria =

Dila Zuria (Greater Dila) is one of the woredas in the Southern Nations, Nationalities and Peoples' Region of Ethiopia. Part of the Gedeo Zone, Dila Zuria is bordered on the southwest by Wenago, on the west by the Oromia Region, on the north by the Sidama Zone, and on the southeast by Bule. Dila town is surrounded by Dila Zuria. Dila Zuria was part of Wenago woreda.

== Demographics ==
Based on the 2007 Census conducted by the CSA, this woreda has a total population of 98,439, of whom 49,413 are men and 49,026 women; none of its population are urban dwellers. The majority of the inhabitants were Protestants, with 83.13% of the population reporting that belief, 7.81% observed traditional religions, 5.31% practiced Ethiopian Orthodox Christianity, 1.16% were Catholic, and 1.02% were Muslim.
