= Arba Minch Airport =

Airport in Arba Minch, South Ethiopia Regional State, Ethiopia

- IATA: AMH; ICAO: HAAM

Summary
- Airport type: Public / Military
- Operator: Ethiopian Airports Enterprise
- Serves: Arba Minch, Ethiopia
- Elevation AMSL: 1,187 m (3,894 ft)
- Coordinates: 06°02′23″N 037°35′25″E

Map
- Location within Ethiopia

Runways
Direction	Length		Surface
Direction	m	ft	Surface
03/21	2,800	9,186	Asphalt concrete

Arba Minch Airport (IATA: AMH, ICAO: HAAM) is a public airport serving Arba Minch, a city in the South Ethiopia Regional State in Ethiopia. The name of the city and airport may also be transliterated as Arba Mintch. The airport is located 5 km (3 miles) northeast of the city centre, near Lake Abaya.

== Facilities ==
The airport sits at an elevation of 1,187 metres (3,894 ft) above mean sea level. Its only runway, designated 03/21, has an asphalt concrete surface and measures 2,800 by 45 metres (9,186 ft × 148 ft).

== Airlines and destinations ==
Airlines	Destinations
Ethiopian Airlines	Addis Ababa

== Military use ==
In October 2011 it was confirmed that the U.S. Seventeenth Air Force was operating General Atomics MQ-9A Reaper unmanned aerial vehicles from the airport for reconnaissance over Somalia. Master Sergeant James Fisher, spokesman for the 17th Air Force, said that an unspecified number of Air Force personnel were working at the Ethiopian airfield “to provide operation and technical support for our security assistance programs.” He also said that the drone flights “will continue as long as the government of Ethiopia welcomes our cooperation on these varied security programs.” The United States military has spent millions of dollars upgrading the airbase to handle the Reapers, and is being used to surveil al-Shabab, but will not conduct airstrikes from the base. However, according to OSGEOINT, mapped imagery of the MQ-9A ranges may also suggest mission support to other countries outside of Somalia.

The US Air Force operations at the base closed down in January 2016.
