= Dilla University =

Public university in Dila, South Ethiopia Regional State, Ethiopia

- ዲላ ዪኒቨርሲቲ
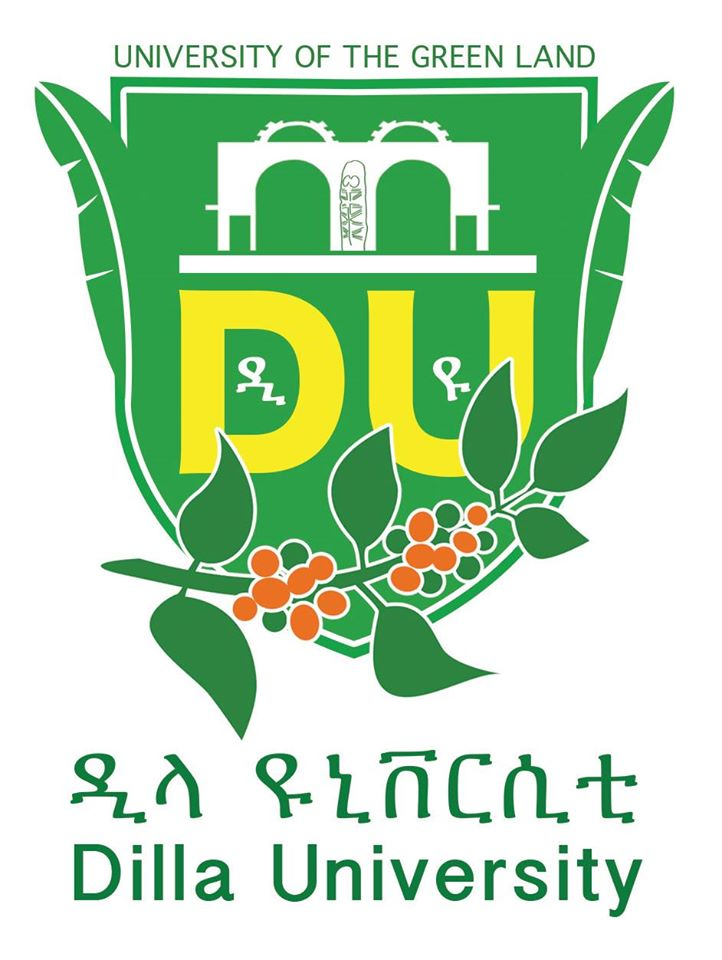
- Motto: The University of the Green Land
- Type: Public
- Established: 1996; 30 years ago
- Accreditation: Ministry of Education
- Budget: 1,550,500 USD per year
- President: Dr. Elias Alemu Bedaso
- Academic staff: 3,000
- Administrative staff: 5,000
- Total staff: 8,000
- Students: 45,000
- Undergraduates: 47
- Postgraduates: 40
- Location: Dilla, South Ethiopia Regional State, Ethiopia; 6.421°N 38.279°E
- Campus: Urban
- Website: www.du.edu.et portal.du.edu.et journal.du.edu.et
- Main campus location

Dilla University (Amharic: ዲላ ዩኒቨርስቲ) is a public university in Dilla town, South Ethiopia Regional State, Ethiopia. Located in Gedeo Zone, it has over 45,000 students belonging to different faculties. Dilla University is often referred to as "University of the Greenland" because of the vibrant greenery in and around Gedeo area.

== History ==
Dilla University has its origins in the Dilla College of Teachers' Education and Health Sciences, first established in 1996. In 2001, it was included in the expansion of a regional Debub University ("Southern" University). From this point, the Dilla campus grew to house 12 departments, though retained a fairly small student base. In 2006, the Council of Ministers granted Dilla its own certification as an independent university, and Debub University was renamed Hawassa University.

== Academics ==
Academics at Dilla University are organized into six colleges (Technology and Engineering; Business and Economics; Health and Medical Science; Social Science and Humanities; Agriculture and Natural Resources; and Natural and Computational Science), two institutes (Indigenous Studies; and Education and Behavioural Science), as well as Center for Language, culture, and society; separate Schools of Law, Continuing and Distance Education; and Graduate Studies.

Dilla University has 62 undergraduate, 45 masters and 4 PhD degree programs. These programs are offered in different disciplines including Agriculture, Business, Education, Engineering, Health Sciences, Natural and Social Sciences.

The university also hosts specialized research centres focused on energy and the environment; education; Food and Nutrition; and Child, Women and Youth.

List of programs offer in Dilla University.

== Notable alumni ==
- Mazengia Demma, businessman and investor
- Dr.Shumete Gizaw INSA General Director

== See also ==
- List of universities and colleges in Ethiopia
- Education in Ethiopia
