= Gedeb =

Gedeb is one of the woredas in the Southern Nations, Nationalities, and Peoples' Region of Ethiopia, named after its major town, Gedeb. Part of the Gedeo Zone, Gedeb is bordered on the east and south by the Oromia Region, on the west by Kochere, on the northwest by Yirgachefe, and on the north by Bule. Gedeb was part of Kochere woreda.

== Demographics ==
Based on the 2007 Census conducted by the CSA, this woreda has a total population of 141,990, of whom 71,113 are men and 70,877 women; 8,931 or 6.29% of its population are urban dwellers. The majority of the inhabitants were Protestants, with 83.88% of the population reporting that belief, 6.04% observed traditional religions, 3.36% practiced Ethiopian Orthodox Christianity, 1.9% were Catholic, and 1.23% were Muslim.
