= Dilla, Ethiopia =

Market town and district in South Ethiopia Regional State, Ethiopia

Dilla ዲላ
- Town
- Location within Ethiopia
- Coordinates: 6°24′38″N 38°18′37″E
- Country: Ethiopia
- Region: South Ethiopia Regional State
- Zone: Gedeo
- Elevation: 1,570 m (5,150 ft)

Population (2007)
  - Total: 59,150
  - Estimate (2021): 151,682
- Time zone: UTC+3 (EAT)
- Climate: Aw

Dilla (Amharic: ዲላ) is a market town and separate woreda in southern Ethiopia. The administrative center of the Gedeo Zone in the former Southern Nations, Nationalities, and Peoples Region (SNNPR) now it is South Ethiopia Regional State (SER), it is located on the main road from Addis Ababa to Nairobi. The town has a longitude and latitude of 6°24′30″N 38°18′30″E, with an elevation of 1570 meters above sea level. It was part of Wenago woreda and is currently surrounded by Dilla Zuria woreda.

Until the completion in the early 1970s of the tarmac road to the Kenya border, Dilla had been located at the southern end of the all-weather road from Addis Ababa and thus became the major transfer and marketing point for coffee grown farther south, particularly of the much-prized Yirgacheffe varietal (see coffee varietals). It remains a major center of the coffee trade.

According to the former SNNPR's Bureau of Finance and Economic Development, as of 2003 Dilla's amenities include digital telephone access, postal service, 24-hour electrical service, numerous banks, and a hospital. Dilla is the site of the Dilla University, which was founded in 1996 and was part of Debub University. The college become a full flagged University since 2007 and composed of more than 30 programs to Masters and bachelor's degree. A number of archeologically significant stelae fields are in the surrounding area, the most notable groups being those at Tutu Fella and Tutiti.

== History ==
Shortly after the capture of Shashemene in May 1941, a mobile force, consisting of one company of the Natal Mounted Rifles and the 6th KAR, with light tanks and armoured cars, moved forward towards Dilla. Almost to its own surprise, this scouting operation cut off the retreat of the 21st and 24th Italian Divisions, pinning them against the east side of Lake Abaya.

By 1958 Dilla was one of 27 places in Ethiopia ranked as First Class Township. The Imperial Railway Company of Ethiopia carried out surveys for extending the railway with a 310 km line from Adama to Dilla between 1960 and 1963. The government formed a Nazareth-Dilla Railway Development Corporation to support this new branch. Although the French government offered a loan to fund this new branch in 1965, and Yugoslav experts had studied and thought the project would be worthwhile, this project was never carried out.

Outside Dilla is Michille (ሚችሌ) hill, where a peasant uprising by the Gedeo people was crushed in 1960. Gedeo elders, invited by Afanegus Eshate Gada to meet him and discuss their grievances with the feudal system they lived under, were ambushed and slaughtered by the army.

On 22 July 1998 there were violent clashes near Dila. The press published conflicting statements about who the parties were and how many had been killed. Ethiopian government spokeswoman Selome Taddesse said that about 140 people were killed and large numbers at least temporarily displaced.

On October 12, 2008, Bekele Girma, an All Ethiopian Unity Party (AEUP) activist, left AEUP's head office in Addis Ababa to open an office in Dila. Despite having a letter from the National Election Board of Ethiopia requesting regional government officials to assist him in opening a local office, Dilla police chief Obsa Hundessa detained Bekele and refused to allow him to open an office in that town. Bekele was released in November.

== Demographics ==
Based on the 2007 Census conducted by the CSA, this town had a total population of 59,150, of whom 31,068 were male and 28,082 female. The plurality of the inhabitants practiced Ethiopian Orthodox Christianity, with 41.65% of the population reporting that belief, 39.2% were Protestants, 15.93% were Muslim, and 2.68% were Catholic.

The 1994 national census reported this town had a total population of 33,734 of whom 17,346 were male and 16,388 were female.
