= Mazengia Demma =

Ethiopian businessman

- Born: July 26, 1970 (age 56); Yabelo, Ethiopia
- Education: Dilla University; International Leadership Institute
- Occupations: Owner, Maz Trading PLC; Director, Web Gemstone Mining
- Spouse: Yordanos Teshale (m. 2000)
- Children: 4

Mazengia Demma Soru (Ge'ez: ማዘንግያ ደማ ሶሩ; born July 26, 1970) is an Ethiopian businessman and investor. He has business interests in international trade and gemstone mining.
