= Gedeo Zone =

Zone in the South Ethiopia Regional State, Ethiopia

Coordinates: 6°10′N 38°20′E

Map of the regions and zones of Ethiopia

Gedeo is a zone in the South Ethiopia Regional State (SERS) of Ethiopia. This zone is named for the Gedeo people, whose homelands lie in this zone. Gedeo is an exclave of the SERS consisting of a narrow strip of land along the eastern escarpment of the Ethiopian Highlands. It is surrounded by the Oromia Region, which borders the Zone on the east, south and west; Gedeo shares its northern boundary with the Sidama Region. Dilla is the administrative center; other towns include Wonago, Yirgachefe, Chelelekitu and Gedeb.

== Overview ==
The altitude of the Zone ranges from 1268 meters above sea level in the vicinity of Lake Abaya to an elevation of 2993 meters at Haro Wolabu Pond. Gedeo has 215 kilometers of all-weather roads and 54 kilometers of dry-weather roads, for an average road density of 199 kilometers per 1000 square kilometers.

The Central Statistical Agency (CSA) reported that 63,562 tons of coffee were produced in Sidama and Gedeo combined in the year ending in 2005, based on inspection records from the Ethiopian Coffee and Tea authority. This represented 63% of the Southern Nations, Nationalities and Peoples' Region (SNNPR)'s output and 28% of Ethiopia's total output. On 28 July 2009, the Zonal agriculture and rural development coordination department in Dila reported that over 359.2 million Birr of coffee had been produced by farmers in the Gedeo Zone over the course of the year. Because of the traditional agrofestry practices employed by the Gedeo people and the cultural importance of the landscape, the Gedeo Cultural Landscape was inscribed on the UNESCO World Heritage List in 2023.

== Demographics ==
The 2007 Census conducted by the Central Statistical Agency of Ethiopia reports this Zone had a total population of 847,434, of whom 424,742 were men and 422,692 women; with an area of 1,210.89 square kilometers, Gedeo had a population density of 699.84. While 107,781 or 12.72% were urban inhabitants, a further 39 individuals were pastoralists. A total of 179,677 households were counted in this Zone, which results in an average of 4.72 persons to a household, and 172,782 housing units. The four largest ethnic groups reported in this Zone were the Gedeo (86.14%), the Oromo (4.71%), the Amhara (3.37%) and the Gurage (1.55%); all other ethnic groups made up 4.23% of the population. Gedeo is spoken as a first language by 86.82%, 5.82% speak Amharic and 4.12% speak Oromiffa; the remaining 3.24% spoke all other primary languages reported. A majority of the inhabitants said they were Protestants, with 73.21% of the population reporting answers in that category, while 10.67% practiced Ethiopian Orthodox Christianity, 7.96% observed traditional religions, 2.44% were Muslim, and 2.11% embraced Catholicism.

In the 1994 Census, Gedeo had a population of 564,073 in 124,874 households, of whom 282,595 were men and 281,478 women; 65,374 or 11.59% of its population were urban dwellers. The five largest ethnic groups reported in this Zone were the Gedeo (81.21%), the Oromo (8.33%), the Amhara (4.35%), the Sidama (1.15%) and the Silt'e (1.11%); all other ethnic groups made up 3.85% of the population. Gedeuffa was spoken as a first language by 81.45%, 7.79% spoke Oromiffa, 7.64% Amharic, and 1.1% spoke Sidamo; the remaining 2.02% spoke all other primary languages reported. A plurality of the inhabitants said they were Protestants, with 43.24% of the population reporting answers in that category, while 24.57% observed traditional religions, 22.1% practiced Ethiopian Orthodox Christianity, 2.84% embraced Catholicism, and 2.77% were Muslim.

According to a May 24, 2004 World Bank memorandum, 11% of the inhabitants of Gedeo had access to electricity, this zone had a road density of 231.7 kilometres per 1000 square kilometres (compared to the national average of 30 kilometres), the average rural household has 0.3 hectare of land (compared to the national average of 1.01 hectare of land and an average of 0.89 for the former SNNPR) and the equivalent of 0.2 heads of livestock. 19.6% of the population were in non-farm related jobs, compared to the national average of 25% and a Regional average of 32%. 65% of all eligible children were enrolled in primary school, and 17% in secondary schools. 40% of the zone is exposed to malaria, and 37% to Tsetse fly. The memorandum gave this zone a drought risk rating of 342.

== Woredas ==
Woredas of Gedeo Zone are:

- Bule woreda
- Dila Town
- Dila Zuria woreda
- Gedeb woreda
- Kochere woreda
- Wenago woreda
- Yirgachefe Town
- Yirgachefe woreda
- Raphe woreda
- Chorso woreda
- Chelelekitu Administrative town
- Gedeb Administrative town
- Wonago Administrative town
