= Dila, Afghanistan =

Dila ډيله
- Village
- Location in Afghanistan
- Coordinates: 32°33′50″N 68°07′52″E
- Country: Afghanistan
- Province: Paktika
- District: Dila
- Elevation: 2,044 m (6,706 ft)
- Time zone: UTC+4:30

Dila (Pashto: ډيله), is the capital of Dila District in Paktika Province, Afghanistan. Dila has an altitude of 2044 m.
