= Lake Chamo =

Lake in southern Ethiopia

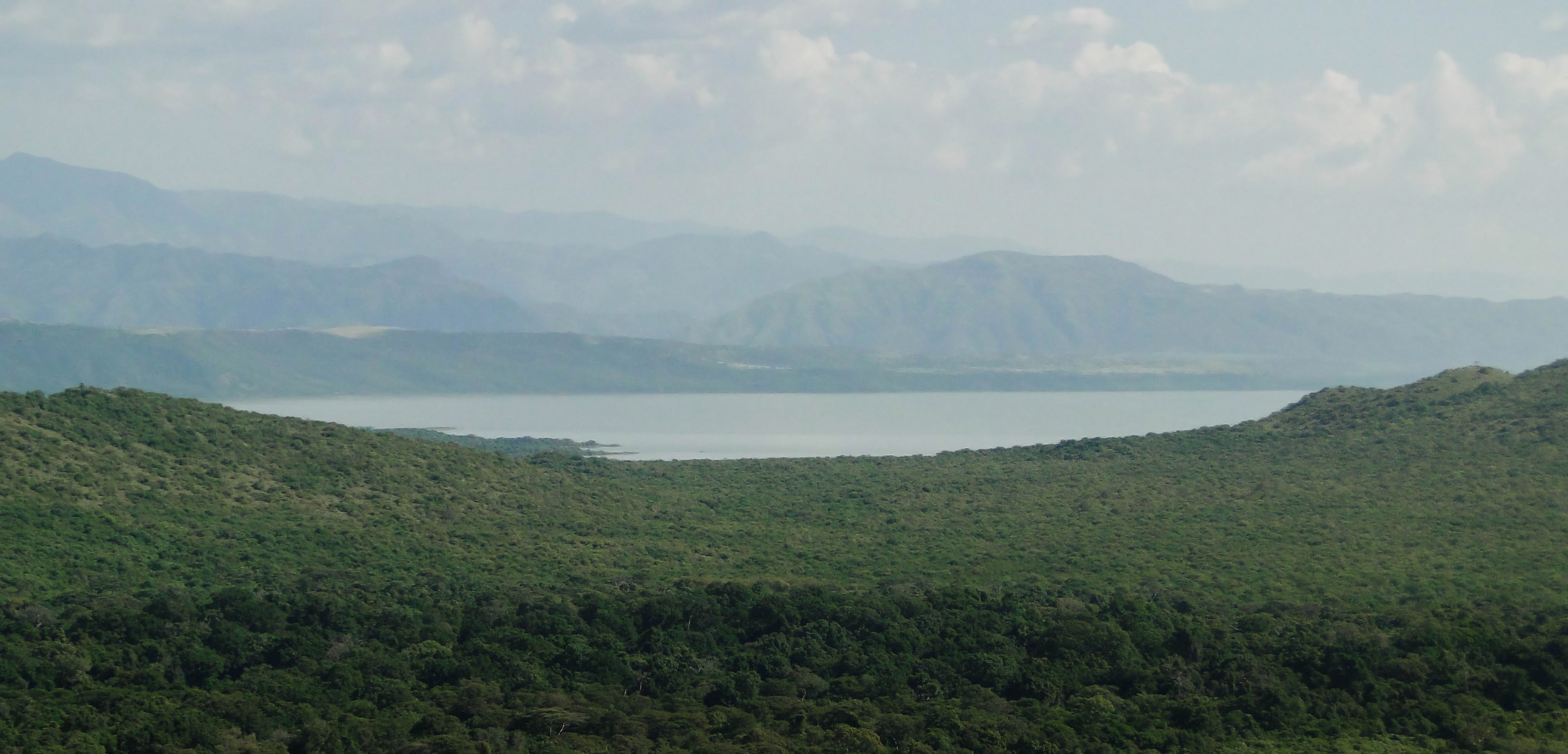
- Lake Chamo seen from Arba Minch

- Location within Ethiopia

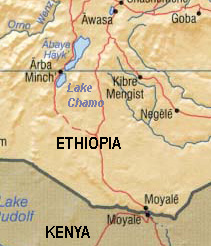
- Coordinates: 5°50′N 37°33′E
- Basin countries: Ethiopia
- Max. length: 32 km (20 mi)
- Max. width: 13 km (8.1 mi)
- Surface area: 317 km^{2} (122 sq mi)
- Max. depth: 14 m (46 ft)
- Surface elevation: 1,110 m (3,640 ft)

Lake Chamo (Amharic: ቻሞ ሐይቅ) is a lake in the South Ethiopia Regional State of southern Ethiopia. Located in the Main Ethiopian Rift, it is at an elevation of 1,110 meters. The Chamo lake is just to the south of Lake Abaya and the city of Arba Minch, east of the Guge Mountains, and west of the Amaro Mountains.

== Overview ==
Lake Chamo's northern end lies in the Nechisar National Park. According to figures published by the Central Statistical Agency, it is 32 kilometers long and 13 wide, with a surface area of 317 square kilometers and a maximum depth of 14 meters with a catchment of about 18757 square kilometers in size. Other sources locate it on an elevation of 1,235 meters with a length of 26 km a widths of 22 km an area of 551 square kilometers a catchment of 2220 square kilometers and a maximum depth of 10 meters.

The lake is fringed with beds of Typha, as well as wetlands. It is fed by the Kulfo River and several small streams, as well as overflow from Lake Abaya brought to it by the Ualo River. Oscar Neumann, exploring the area in 1901, found a dry channel connecting Lake Chamo to the Sagan River, which led him to conclude the lake contributes to the Sagan in years of heavy rainfall.

Wildlife include fish like the catfish Bagrus docmak and Nile perch, as well as hippopotamus and Nile crocodiles.

== Gallery ==
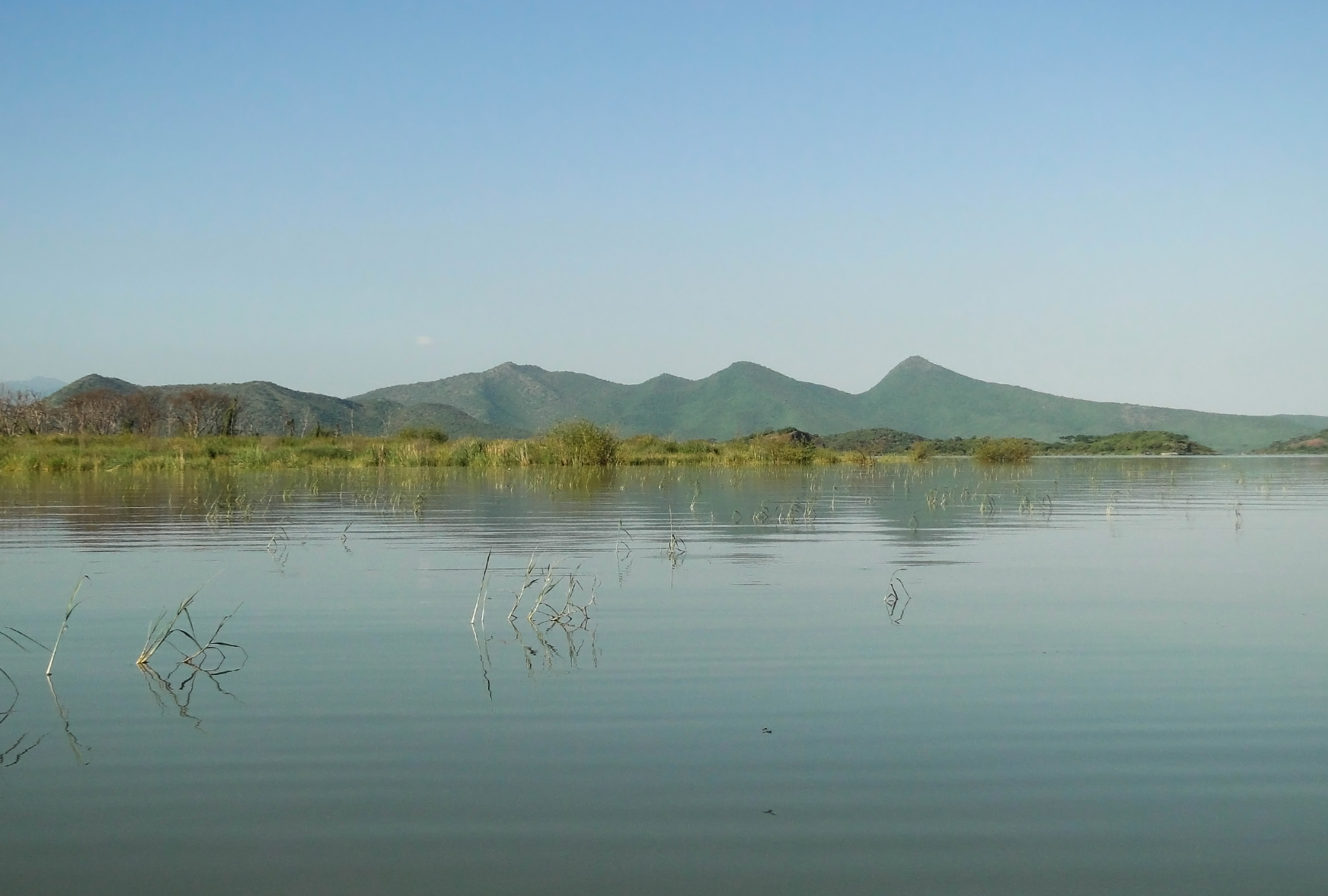
On the lake

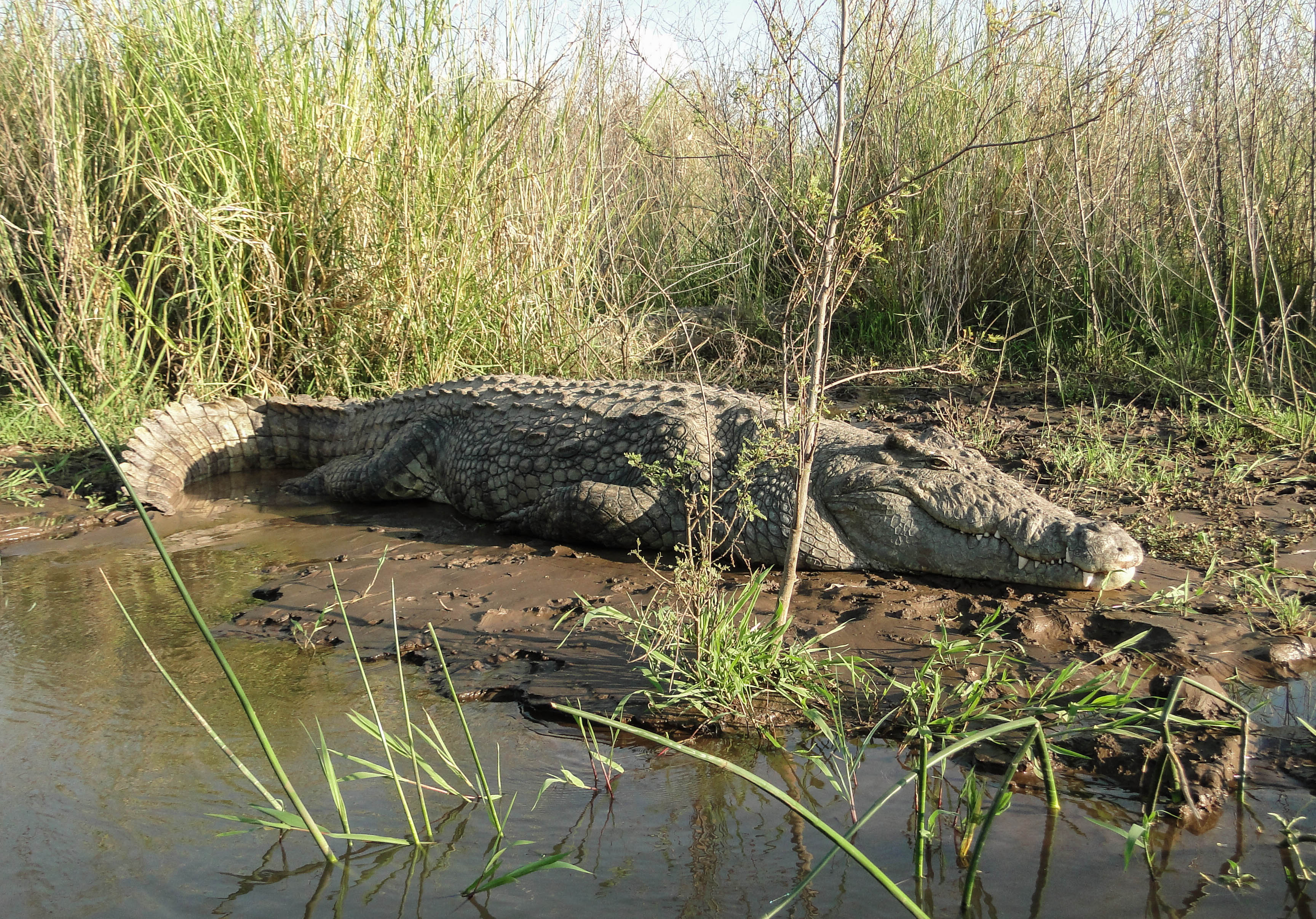
Nile crocodile

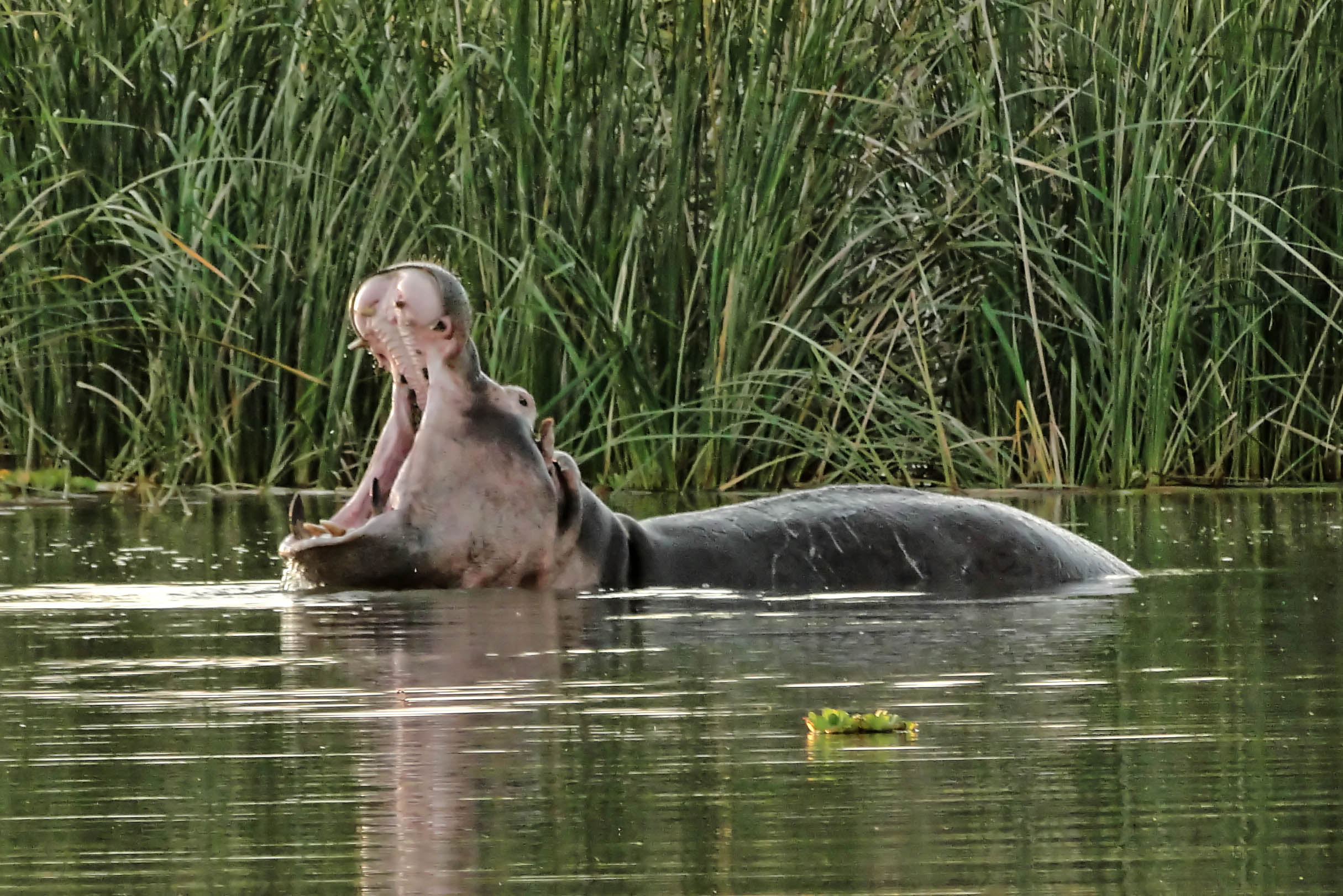
Hippopotamus

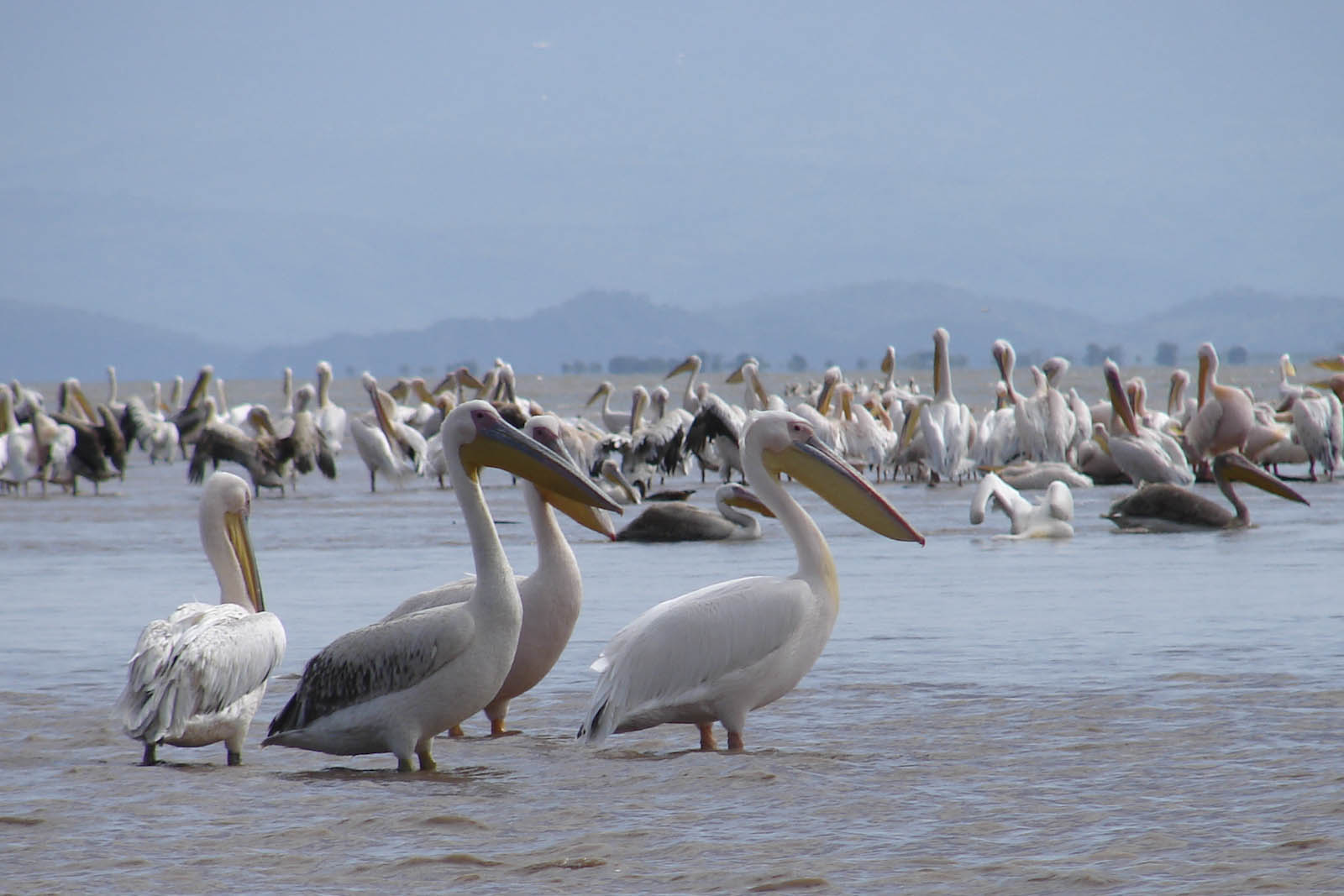
Pelicans

== See also ==
- Rift Valley lakes
