= Abaya (surname) =

Abaya is a surname. Notable people with the surname include:

- César Abaya (born 1984), Chadian professional football player
- Craig Abaya (born 1979), American recording artist, filmmaker, photographer, and university program director (Uh-béy-uh)
- Francis Gerald Abaya (born 1975), Filipino politician
- Jun Abaya (born 1966), Filipino politician
- Marc Abaya (born 1979), Filipino musician and television host
- Marilou Diaz-Abaya (1955–2012), Filipino film director
