= Coffee production in Ethiopia =

Aspect of agriculture

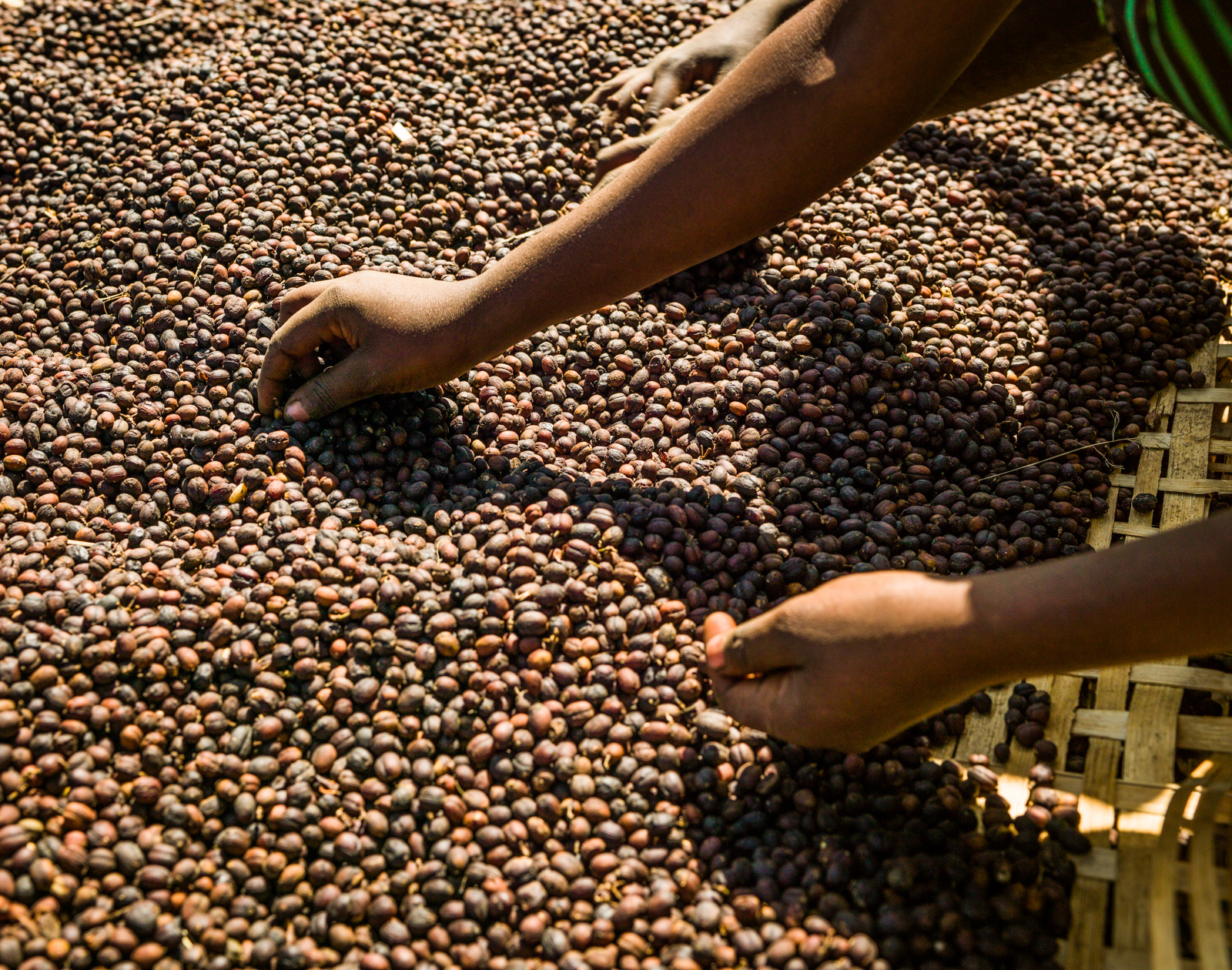
An example of the coffee bean sorting process in Hawassa, Sidama Region

Coffee production in Ethiopia has a long history and remains an important part of the country’s agricultural and economic landscape. Ethiopia is within the native range of Coffea arabica, which occurs naturally in the highlands of southern Ethiopia, South Sudan and northern Kenya. Coffee is now cultivated in many parts of the world, but Ethiopia remains a major producer and exporter of Arabica coffee. Recent estimates indicate that Ethiopia is expected to produce approximately 12.1 million 60-kilogram bags of coffee in the 2026/27 marketing year, following an estimated production of 11.6 million bags in 2025/26. Coffee is also one of Ethiopia’s most important agricultural export commodities and important to the economy of Ethiopia. In the 2024/25 marketing year, the country exported approximately 7.43 million bags of coffee, generating around US$2.89 billion in export revenue. The sector supports millions of livelihoods across the country, with approximately 5.9 million farmers engaged directly in coffee production.

== History ==
The coffee plant originates in the Ethiopian region of Kaffa. According to legend, the 9th-century goat herder Kaldi discovered the coffee plant after noticing the energizing effect the plant had on his flock, but this story did not appear in writing until 1671. After originating in Ethiopia, coffee was consumed as a beverage in Yemen, possibly around the 6th century, even though the origin of coffee drinking is obscure. From Yemen, coffee spread into Istanbul, Cairo, and Damascus. Ethiopian Christians refrained from drinking coffee due to its perceived association with Muslims until the 19th century. The first coffee houses in Europe opened in Venice in 1645. The first coffee house in the United States began in Boston in 1689. Demand for coffee increased drastically in the 1960s, leading to opening of the first Starbucks store in Seattle in 1971.

=== Politics and the ECX ===
From 1974 to 1991, Ethiopia was ruled by a Marxist dictatorship. Coffee farms were consolidated into large, collective farms, and required to sell to the government at a subsidized price. After 1991, the government allowed farms to form cooperatives and set fair prices.

In 2008, the Ethiopia Commodity Exchange (ECX) was established to modernize the trade of agricultural commodities including coffee, improve price transparency, and streamline transactions. Initially, coffee sold through the ECX was pooled by grade and region, which largely stripped specific origin traceability-international buyers could not reliably identify the washing station, cooperative, or producer behind a given lot. This pooling practice drew criticism from specialty roasters and importers who argued that it diluted the premium value of Ethiopia's most distinctive regional coffees.

Beginning in 2017, a series of reforms to the ECX trading rules aimed to restore traceability and allow greater flexibility in the coffee value chain. The practice of blending coffee lots from different origins was curtailed, enabling buyers to trace coffees back to the original washing station. Certain exporters, cooperatives, and vertically integrated producers gained the right to hold export licences and own processing facilities, and licensed exporters may now sell directly to overseas buyers within a limited period after coffee arrives at ECX warehouses rather than exclusively through the exchange's auction floor. As a result, origin documentation for specialty lots has improved significantly, and a growing number of exporters operate under direct specialty export licences outside the auction system.

These reforms have reshaped how Ethiopian coffee reaches the international market. Private and cooperative channels-including direct relationships between producers and overseas roasters-now account for a larger share of exports, particularly for high-scoring specialty lots. The ECX nonetheless continues to serve as an important quality-control and price-discovery venue for the majority of commercially graded coffees.

== Production ==
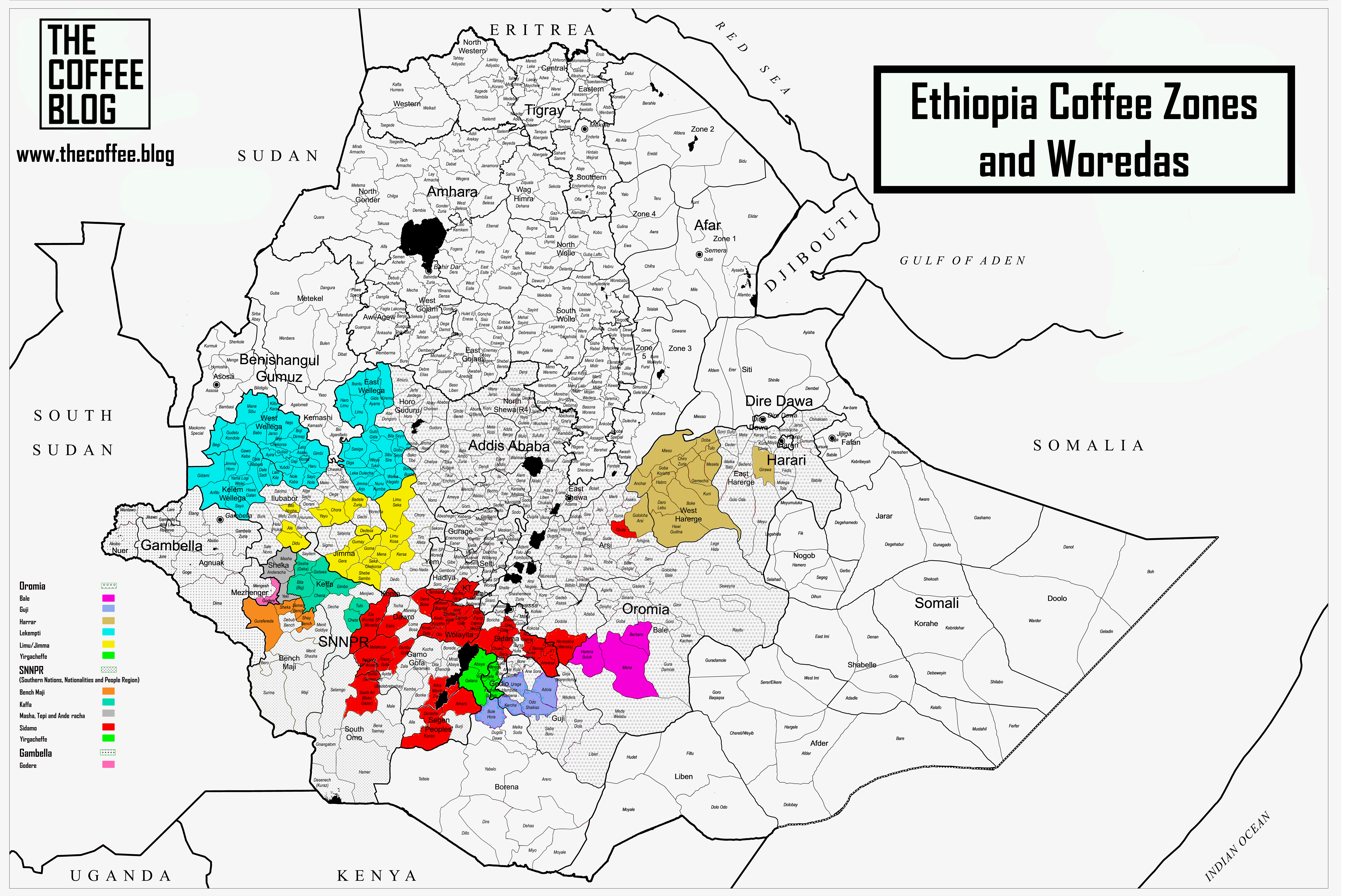
2018 map of Ethiopia's coffee zones and woredas

Ethiopia is the world's fifth largest producer of coffee, and Africa's top producer, with 496,200 tonnes in 2022. Over 4 million small-scale farmers produce coffee. Half of the coffee is consumed by Ethiopians, and the country leads the continent in domestic consumption. The major markets for Ethiopian coffee are the EU (about half of exports), East Asia (about a quarter) and North America. The total area used for coffee cultivation is estimated to be about 4,000 km^{2} (1,500 sq mi). The exact size is unknown due to the fragmented nature of the coffee farms. The way of production has not changed much, with nearly all work, cultivating and drying, still done by hand. Ethiopia's coffees can be divided into three main categories, depending on their method of production: Forest Coffees, from wild coffee trees grown mostly in the southwest of the country; Garden Coffees, from trees typically planted around a homestead or other dwelling; Plantation Coffees, from trees grown intensively on large farms.

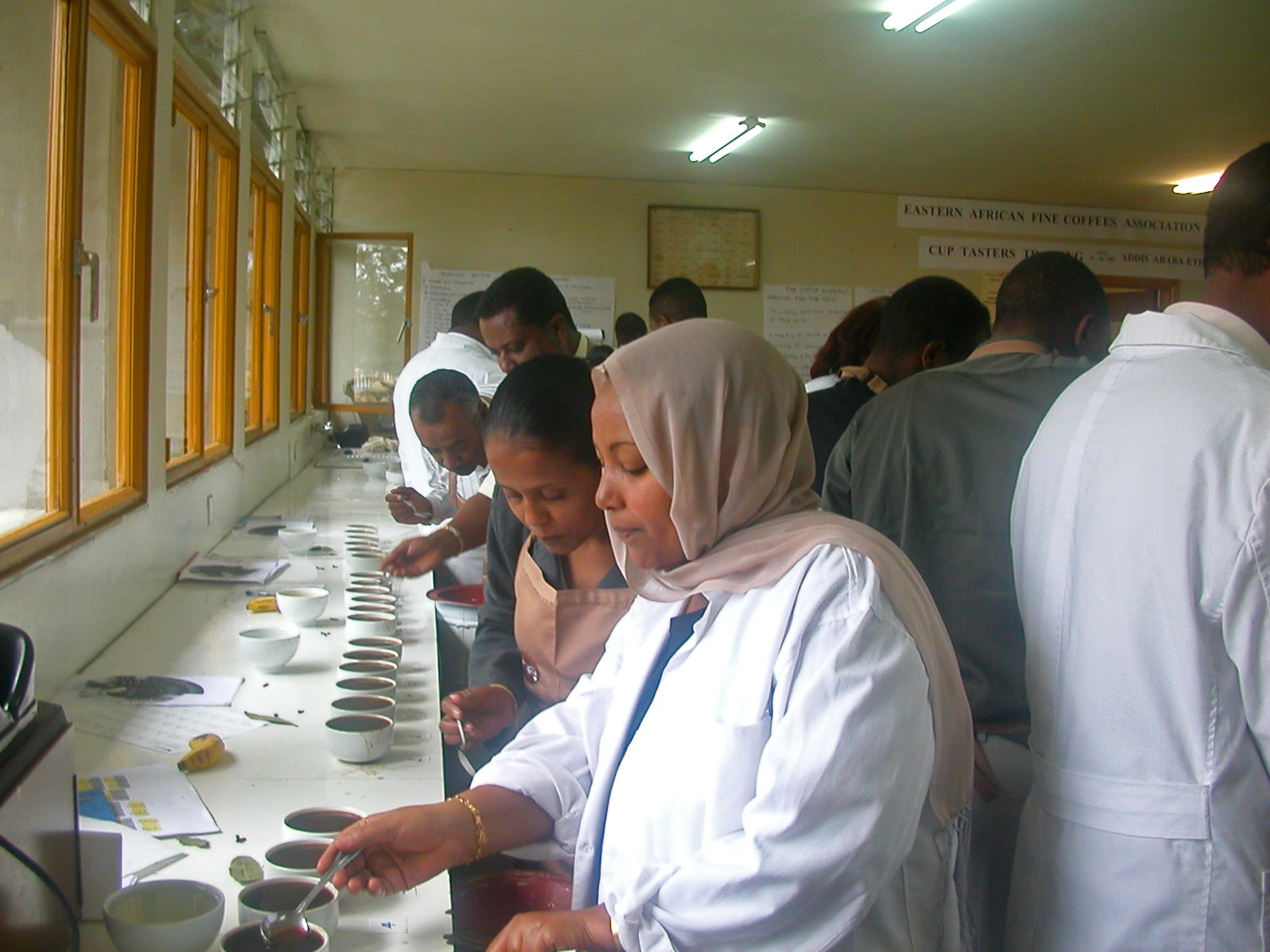
A training seminar for coffee tasters (cuppers) in 2003

The revenues from coffee exports account for 10% of the annual government revenue, because of the large share the industry is given very high priority, but there are conscious efforts by the government to reduce the coffee industry's share of the GDP by increasing the manufacturing sector.

The Tea and Coffee Authority, part of the federal government, handles anything related to coffee and tea, such as fixing the price at which the stations buy coffee from the farmers. This is a legacy from a nationalization scheme set in action by the previous regime that turned over all the washing stations to farmers cooperatives. The domestic market is heavily regulated through licenses, with the goal of avoiding market concentration.

== Beans ==
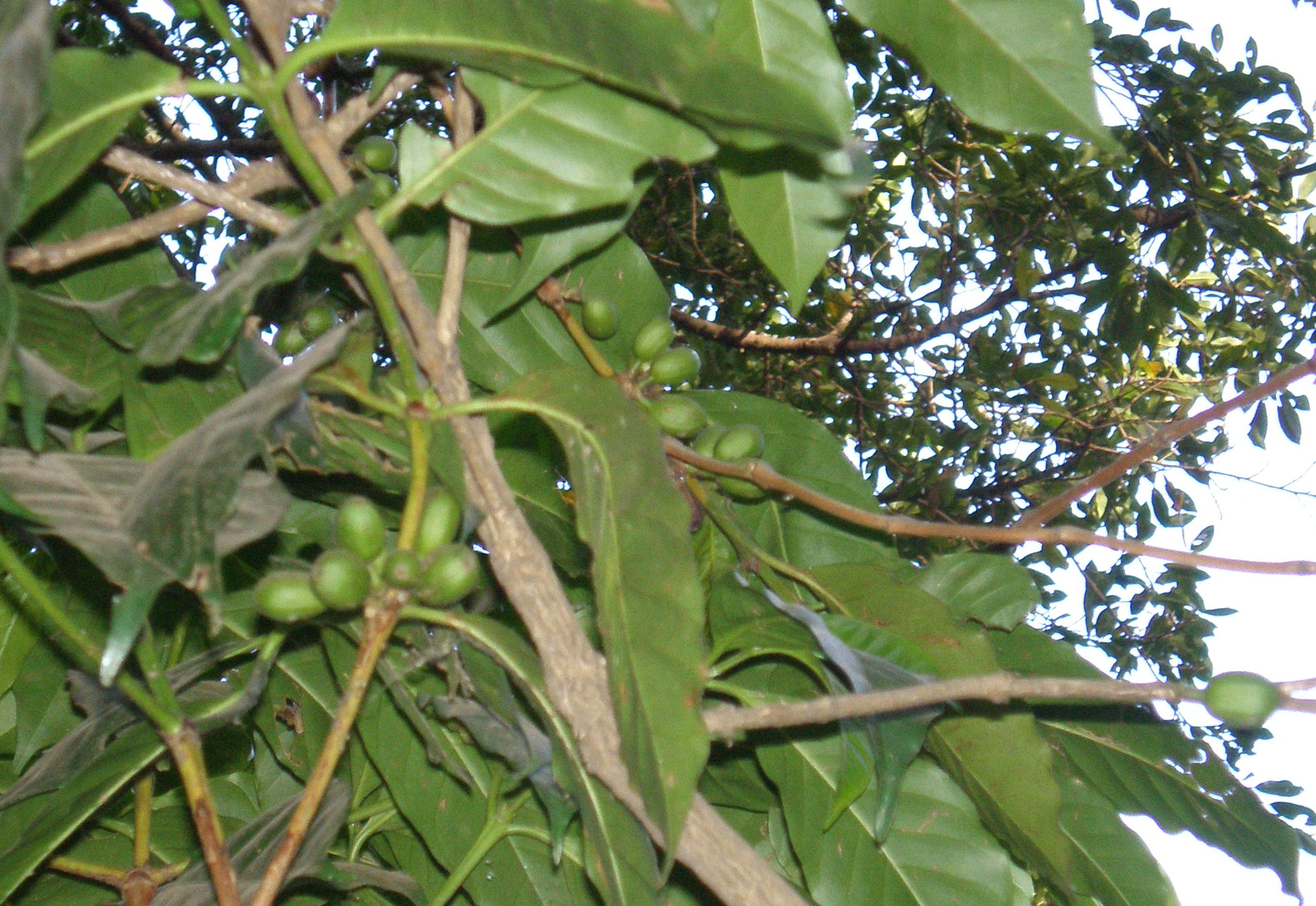
A Coffea arabica tree on Lake Tana in Bahir Dar

Ethiopian coffee beans of the species Coffea arabica can be divided into three categories: Longberry, Shortberry, and Mocha. Longberry varieties consist of the largest beans and are often considered of the highest quality in both value and flavour. Shortberry varieties are smaller than the Longberry beans but, are considered a high grade bean in Eastern Ethiopia where it originates. Also the Mocha variety is a highly prized commodity. Mocha Harars are known for their peaberry beans that often have complex chocolate, spice and citrus notes.

=== Regional varieties ===
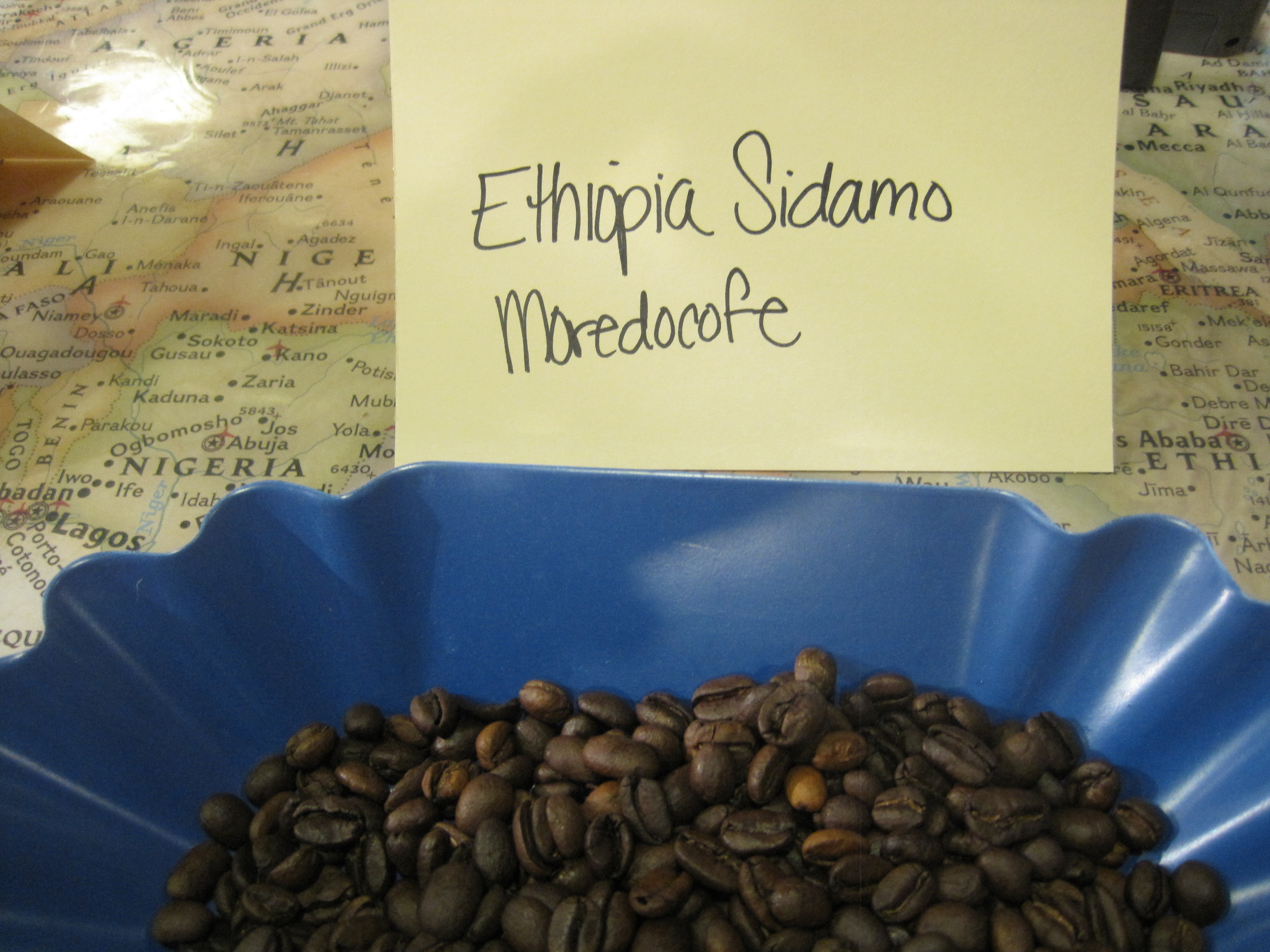
Ethiopian Sidamo beans

Ethiopian coffee beans that are grown in either the Harar, Yirgacheffe, Limu, Jimma or Kaffa regions are kept apart and marketed under their regional name. These regional varieties are trademarked names with the rights owned by Ethiopia.

==== Sidama ====
It is very likely that in and around this region is where coffee had its origins. Sidamo coffee is well-balanced with cupping notes exhibiting berries and citrus with complex acidity. The coffee hails from the province of Sidamo in the Ethiopian Highlands at elevations from 1,500 up to 2,200 meters above sea level. At these elevations the coffee beans can be qualified as "Strictly High Grown" (SHG). Here the Ethiopian coffees grow more slowly and therefore have more time to absorb nutrients and develop more robust flavors based on the local climate and soil conditions. The most distinctive flavour notes found in all Sidamo coffees are lemon and citrus with bright crisp acidity. Sidamo coffee includes Yirgachefe Coffee and Guji Coffee. Both coffee types are very high quality.

==== Genika ====
"Ethiopia Genika" is a type of Arabica coffee of single origin grown exclusively in the Bench Maji Zone of Ethiopia. Like most African coffees, Ethiopia Guraferda features a small and greyish bean, yet is valued for its deep, spice and wine or chocolate-like taste and floral aroma.

==== Harar ====
Harar is in the Eastern highlands of Ethiopia. It is one of the oldest coffee beans still produced and is known for its distinctive fruity, wine flavour. The shells of the coffee bean are used in a tea called hasher-qahwa. The bean is medium in size with a greenish-yellowish colour. It has medium acidity and full body and a distinctive mocha flavour. Harar is a dry processed coffee bean with sorting and processing done almost entirely by hand. Though processing is done by hand, the laborers are extremely knowledgeable of how each bean is categorized.

==== Kaffa ====
Kaffa coffee is named after the region it comes from, Kaffa, located in south-west Ethiopia. It is also the birthplace of the Arabica plant, mother to all other Arabica coffee plants. Not cultivated nor maintained, the coffee grows wild in the middle of deep forests, between 1,400 to 2,100 meters above sea level. Kaffa is thus a forest coffee but can also be found as a semi-forest coffee.

== Impact of climate change ==
Previously, Ethiopia's altitude, temperature, and soil served as opportunities for coffee production. Now, Ethiopia faces constraints pertaining to climate change. The mean annual temperature of Ethiopia has increased rapidly; it is projected to increase by 1.1-3.1 degrees Celsius by 2060. Temperature increases are directly correlated with invasive pests and disease development, both of which can cause production lost when disregarded. Also increasing is the uncertainty of yearly weather patterns. The growing length of the dry season decreases the amount of rainfall in Ethiopian forests where coffee is grown. In addition, dramatic forest loss in Ethiopia threatens coffee cultivation by eliminating factors needed, such as forest cover needed to reduce air and soil temperatures. These climate-related abiotic factors have the potential to decrease coffee yield by 70%. To build resilience, relocation of coffee farms into more suitable areas, likely at higher elevation, may be required to sustain Ethiopian coffee production and the Ethiopian economy. Further, farming adaptations could ensure resilience and improve productivity. These adaptions include irrigation to maintain soil water, tree shade management to protect forest cover, mulching to better soil fertility, terracing to improve soil quality and reduce water run-off, and pruning to maximize crop potential.

== Climate and sustainability ==
Ethiopian coffee production is highly sensitive to climate change, with increasing temperatures and irregular rainfall affecting yields in major coffee-growing regions such as Sidama and Yirgacheffe. To address these challenges, Ethiopian farmers and cooperatives have adopted sustainable practices including shade-grown coffee, water conservation techniques, and organic certification programs. These efforts aim to maintain both the quality and economic viability of Ethiopia's coffee while protecting local ecosystems.

== Starbucks and Ethiopian coffee ==
On 26 October 2006, Oxfam accused Starbucks of asking the National Coffee Association (NCA) to block a US trademark application from Ethiopia for three of the country's coffee beans, Sidamo, Harar and Yirgacheffe. They claimed this could result in denying Ethiopian coffee farmers potential annual earnings of up to £47m.

Ethiopia and Oxfam America urged Starbucks to sign a licensing agreement with Ethiopia to help boost prices paid to farmers. At issue was Starbucks' use of Ethiopia's famed coffee brands-Guji, Sidamo, Yirgacheffe and Harar-that generate high margins for Starbucks and cost consumers a premium, yet generated very low prices to Ethiopian farmers.

Robert Nelson, the head of the NCA, added that his organization initiated the opposition for economic reasons, "For the U.S. industry to exist, we must have an economically stable coffee industry in the producing world ... This particular scheme is going to hurt the Ethiopian coffee farmers economically." The NCA claimed the Ethiopian government was being badly advised and this move could price them out of the market.

Facing more than 92,000 letters of concern, Starbucks had placed pamphlets in its stores accusing Oxfam of "misleading behavior" and insisting that its "campaign need[s] to stop". On 7 November, The Economist derided Oxfam's "simplistic" stance and Ethiopia's "economically illiterate" government, arguing that Starbucks' (and Illy's) standards-based approach would ultimately benefit farmers more. In conclusion of this issue, on 20 June 2007, representatives of the Government of Ethiopia and senior leaders from Starbucks Coffee Company announced that they had executed an agreement regarding distribution, marketing and licensing that recognizes the importance and integrity of Ethiopia's specialty coffee designations. Financial terms regarding this agreement were not disclosed.

Starbucks, as part of the deal, also was set to market Ethiopian coffee during two promotional periods in 2008. A Starbucks spokesman said the announcement is "another development" in the relationship with Ethiopia and a way to raise the profile of Ethiopian coffee around the world.

An Oxfam spokesman said the deal sounds like a "useful step" as long as farmers are benefiting, and was a big step from previous years when Starbucks "wasn't engaging directly (with) Ethiopians on adding value to their coffee".

== See also ==
- Agriculture in Ethiopia
- Coffee ceremony
- Oromia Coffee Farmers Cooperative Union
- List of countries by coffee production
