= Dila District, Afghanistan =

Dila ډيله
- District
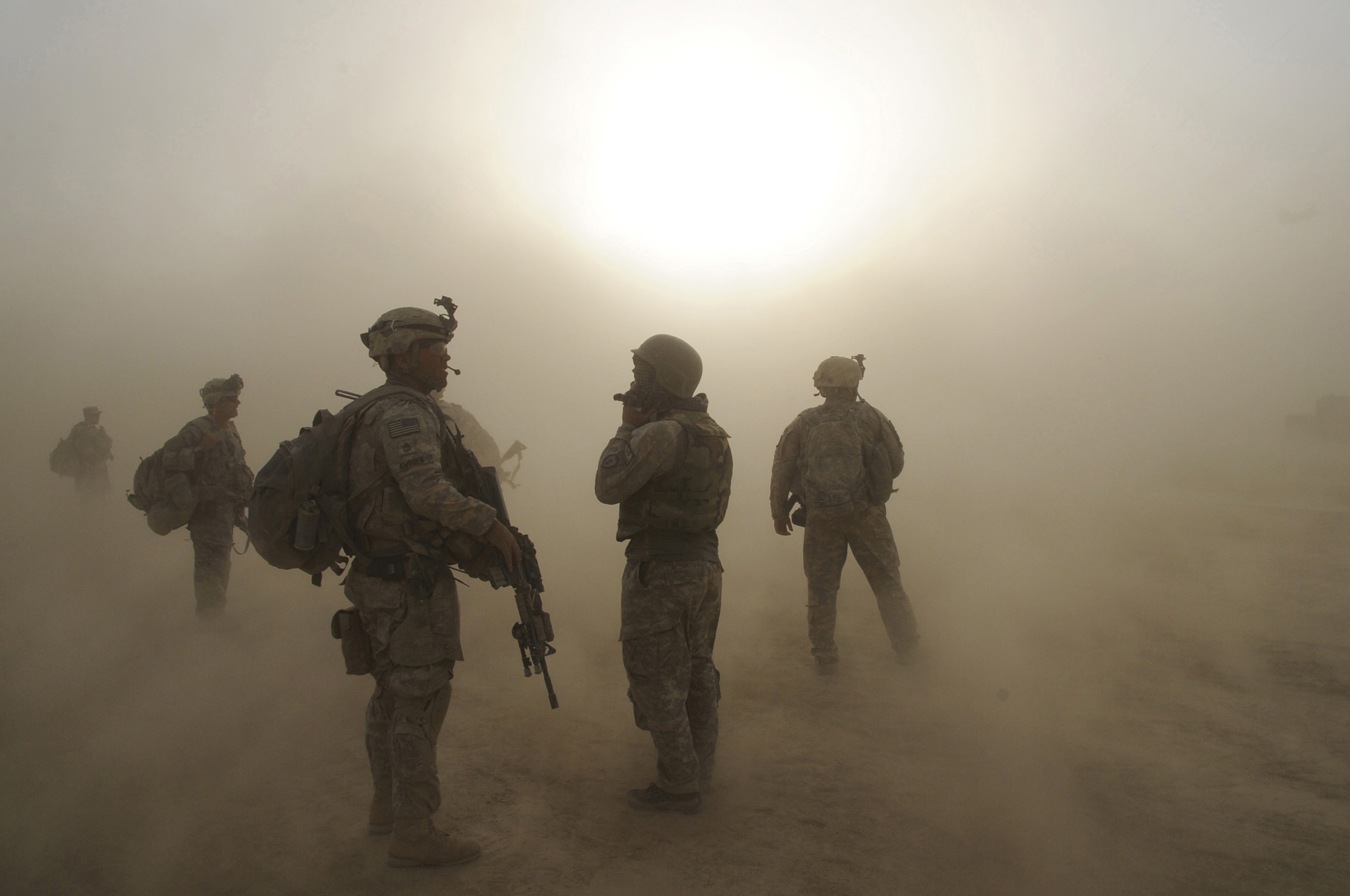
- Soldiers of the 501st Infantry Regiment at Forward Operating Base Kushamond during a sandstorm.
- Nickname: حاجی عالم گل کلی
- Location in Afghanistan
- Coordinates: 32°33′50″N 68°07′52″E
- Country: Afghanistan
- Province: Paktika
- Capital: Dila

Government
  - Sub-governor: Habibullah

Area
  - Total: 600 km^{2} (230 sq mi)
- Elevation: 1,983 m (6,506 ft)

Population (2019)
  - Total: 47,023
- Time zone: UTC+4:30
- Geonames: 7053775

Dila District (Pashto: ډيله ولسوالۍ) is a district of Paktika Province, Afghanistan. The district is within the heartland of the Sulaimankhel tribe of Ghilji Pashtuns.

Its population in 2019 was estimated to be 47,023. The area is approximately 600 km^{2}. The seat of the district capital is Dila village, with a couple of hundred families. There are a number of other small villages in the area, with occupancies ranging from 3-50 families. Kuchi nomads migrate through the area with their families and herds of goats, sheep, and camels. The dominant tribes include the Suleiman Khel, Sultan Khel, and Jalalzai, and a considerable number of sub-tribes. The sub-governor/district leader is Habibullah, and the police chief is named Eid Gul, though Eid Gul was subsequently sighted in Doa China district. The local shura can attract over 100 elders if the event is big enough. Otherwise, the shura normally attracts about 30 elders.

The area has several routes through it from Wazakhwa and Nawa to HWY 1 and they are often used for drug trafficking and movement of insurgents.

The language spoken here is primarily Pashtu. Most people are uneducated, though there are several elders who are educated and are the local peoples' representatives to the district chief.

Much of the terrain is very desolate, and the roads are unimproved. Access time by a motorcar or motorbike traveling the roads to HWY 1 can range from 1–4 hours, with much jolting. The summertime sees much dust and little rain, though in the winter Dila gets a considerable amount of snow, leading to melting and mud in the late winter or early spring. However, this all dries up by the end of April through early May, when it becomes hot during the day. Mosquitoes and flies are prevalent. The northern region of Dila has some foothills which are greener than the lowlands, though the vegetation remains scrub. The local river is seasonal, and consequently the locals desire a bridge to go across it in the wet season. Local fauna includes dogs, tortoises, goats, sheep, camels, chickens, and snakes.

Construction is all Afghan mud-wall building. The town is organically built up, meaning that there is no road grid but rather a winding of trails and roads that goes through the town. Water is supplied by local wells, several being installed by reconstruction teams, but many being hand-dug for families as well.

The primary method of subsistence is farming, although there are one or two small bazaars in the district. The bazaar is supplied by merchants going to Sharana or to some of the smaller bazaars on HWY 1 near Moqor to the north. In the spring, after the rainy season and melting season, the river floods, and the farmers pump the river dry to irrigate their farm beds. Karezes are prevalent in the northern part of Dila due to lack of proximity to any above-ground water source. Dila itself has a main store. Several families around Dila do general contracting for building or earthworks. The Afghans also herd for a living, using the herds as a measure of wealth as well as subsistence.

Health care here is nonexistent; there is a doctor in town, but his credentials are unknown. Locals will typically go to him or to one of the towns on Highway 1 for care.

Education here is nearly nonexistent. There are a few private "schools" in which an educated adult will educate a few children, but there is no organized government effort at schooling as of 2007.

There is no central electric system here, though some villagers have private generators they run to power the mosque speakers and some private residences. There are living Alikhail tribe members, which are divided into two branches:

(1):Khozi and (2):Menzi
