= Irgachefe =

Coffee from the Yirgacheffe zone in Ethiopia

Coordinates: 6°10′N 38°12′E

Irgachefe (ይርጋጨፌ Yïrgach’äffe, also transliterated as Yirgachefe) is a town in central southern Ethiopia in Yirgachefe District. Located in the Gedeo Zone of the Southern Nations, Nationalities and Peoples' Region, this town has an elevation between 1,880 and 1,919 metres (6,168 and 6,296 ft) above sea level. It is the administrative center of Yirgachefe woreda (or district), an important coffee growing area.

Based on figures from the Central Statistical Agency in 2005, Irgachefe has an estimated total population of 20,979 of whom 10,501 were men and 10,478 were women. According to the 1994 national census, this town had a total population of 11,579 of whom 5,814 were men and 5,765 were women.

Irgachefe was part of the Mediterranean and Middle East theatre of World War II. Advancing from Yabelo, the British recaptured Irgachefe on 27 April 1941. However, the road further north was so bad that it took ten days to travel 80 kilometres (50 mi), making the transport of supplies almost impossible. As a result, two battalions returned to Yabelo with the motor transport vehicles, while one battalion continued the advance northward carrying the ammunition and food supplies by foot and mule pack.
