= Dilla District =

Dilla
- District
- Country: Somaliland
- Region: Awdal
- Capital: Dilla
- Time zone: UTC+3 (EAT)

Dilla District (Somali: Degmada Dilla) is a district in the northwestern Awdal region of Somaliland. Its capital lies at Dilla.

== Demographics ==
This district is exclusively inhabited by the Mohamuud Nuur, one of the two sub divisions of Reer Nuur, a subclan of the Gadabuursi.

R.J Hayward and I.M. Lewis (2005) both state that Dilla is the major town and region of the Reer Mohamuud Nuur:

"The major town of the Rer Mohamoud Nur, Dila."

== See also ==
- Administrative divisions of Somaliland
- Regions of Somaliland
- Districts of Somaliland
