= Nechisar National Park =

National park in South Ethiopia Regional State, Ethiopia

- IUCN category II (national park)
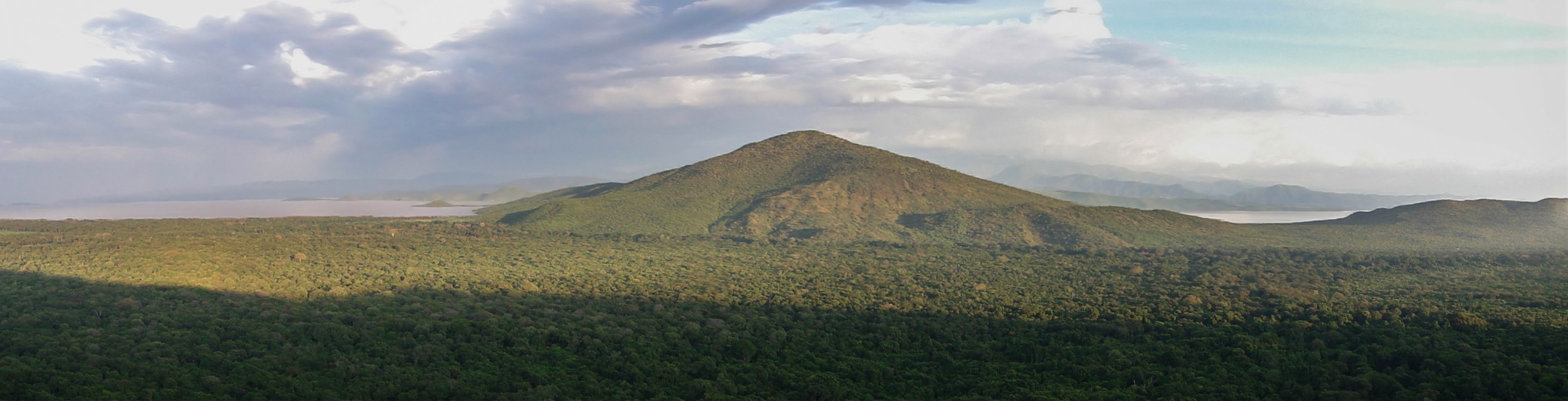
- Nechisar National Park with Lake Abaya on the left and Lake Chamo on the right

- Location within Ethiopia
- Interactive map of Nechisar National Park
- Location: South Ethiopia Regional State, Ethiopia
- Nearest city: Arba Minch
- Coordinates: 6°02′N 37°35′E
- Area: 1,030 km^{2} (400 sq mi)
- Established: 1974
- Governing body: Ethiopian Wildlife Conservation Authority
- Website: nechisarnationalpark.com

Nechisar National Park is a national park in Ethiopia. It is in the Great Rift Valley within the southwestern Ethiopian Highlands.

== Geography ==
The 750 km^{2} (290 sq mi) park includes the "Bridge of God", an isthmus between Lake Abaya and Lake Chamo, and the Nechisar (English: white grass) plains east of the lakes. It is east of Arba Minch. Park elevations range between 1,108 and 1,650 m (3,635 and 5,413 ft).

== History ==
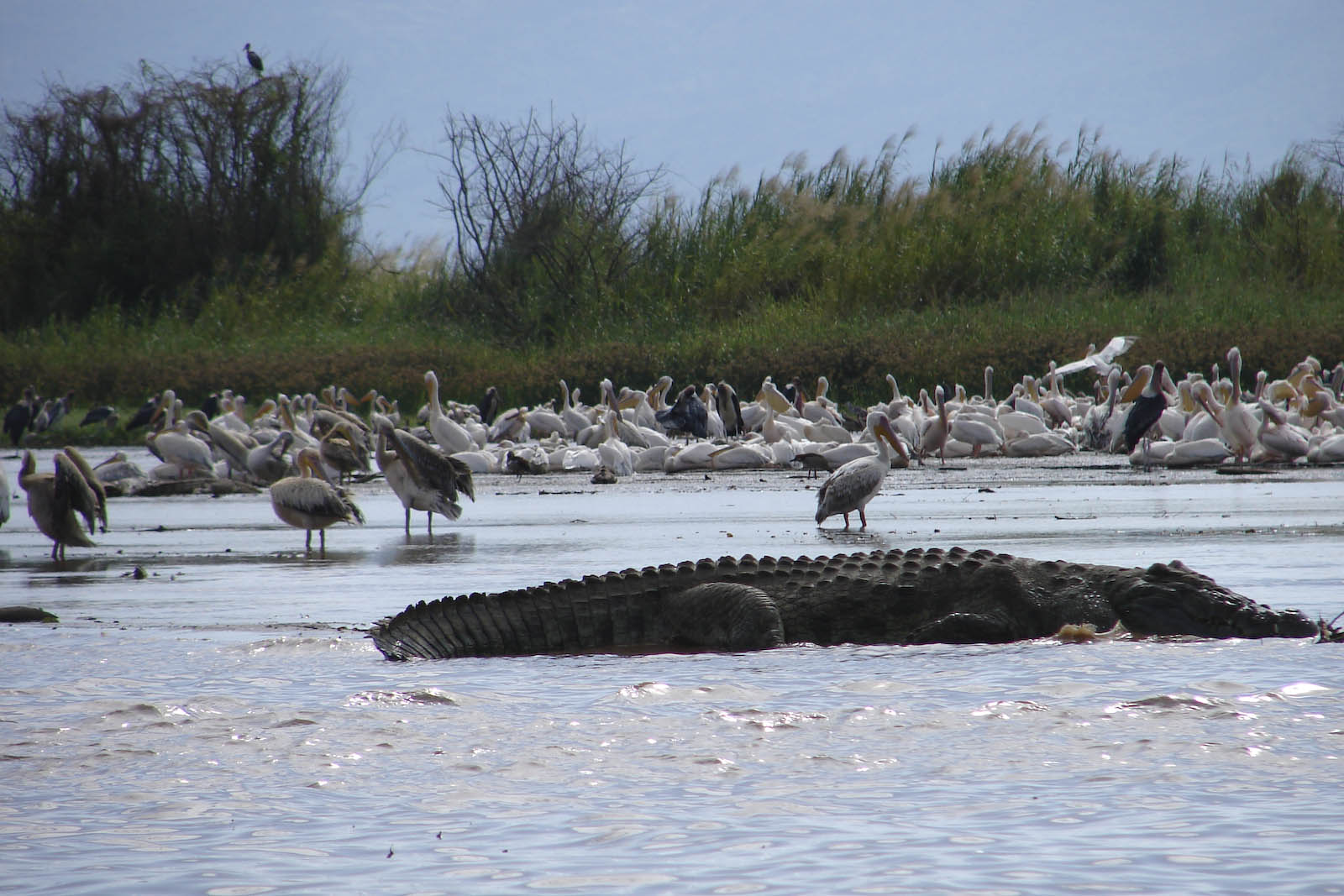
Nile Crocodile and the flock of Pelicans settled at Lake Chamo

Nechsar National Park was proposed in 1967, then officially established in 1974. Since then it has not legally been gazetted, but has functioned as de facto national park. Following the recommendations of the Ethiopian Ministry of Agriculture recommendation, in 1982 the local Guji, who had been living as pastoralists in the lowlands beside Lake Abaya and Chamo "were forcibly evicted from the park at gun point".

In the lawless period at the end of the Derg rule and immediately afterwards, Nechisar suffered much damage. Park buildings located far from the headquarters were looted and damaged. At the same time, the local Guji returned to their traditional grazing areas. According to one source, they fled there from the attacks of the Borena Oromo, who in turn were victimized by neighboring ethnic groups, their presence degrading the environment and contributing to the local extinction of many species. The Guji also acquired firearms during this period, and used them to resist eviction from the park afterwards. In 2005, Refugees International criticized their eviction.

== Geography and landscape ==
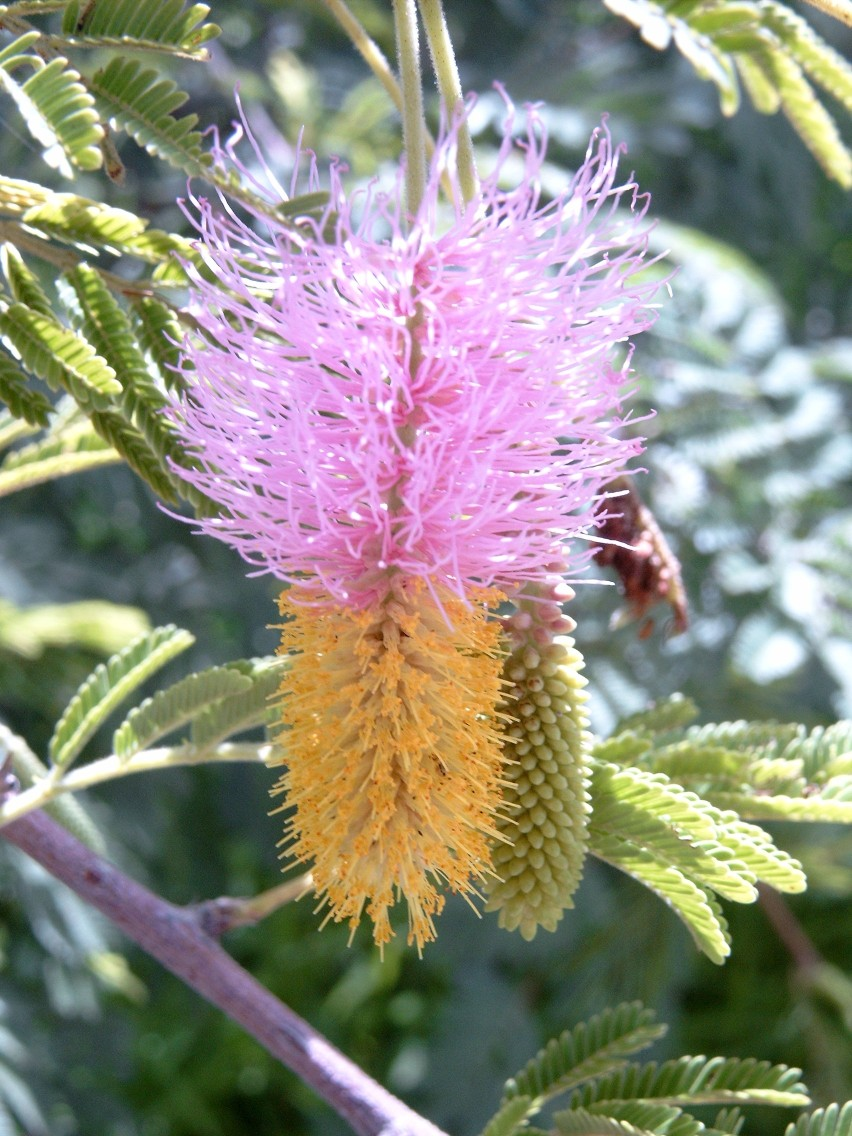
Dichrostachys cinerea

The important regional centre to the park is Arba Minch in the Main Ethiopian Rift. Approximately 15% of the park consists of lakes including Lake Abaya in the north and Lake Chamo in the south. Part of the habitat consists of the groundwater forest and shoreline of the lakes, but there are also dry grassy plains. The altitude ranges from 1,108 meters above sea level at the shore of Lake Chamo to 1,650 meters on Mount Tabala in the north-east, renowned for its hot springs. Taller trees found in the park include Dichrostachys cinerea, Acacia tortilis, Balanites aegyptiaca and less common Acacia nilotica. The southern part of the park is dominated by edaphic grassland and a calcareous black clay soil underneath with Dobera glabra, Acacia tortilis and the grass Chrysopogon aucheri forming much of the landscape. Both invasive species and woody plant encroachment are a threat to the biodiversity of the national park.

== Wildlife ==
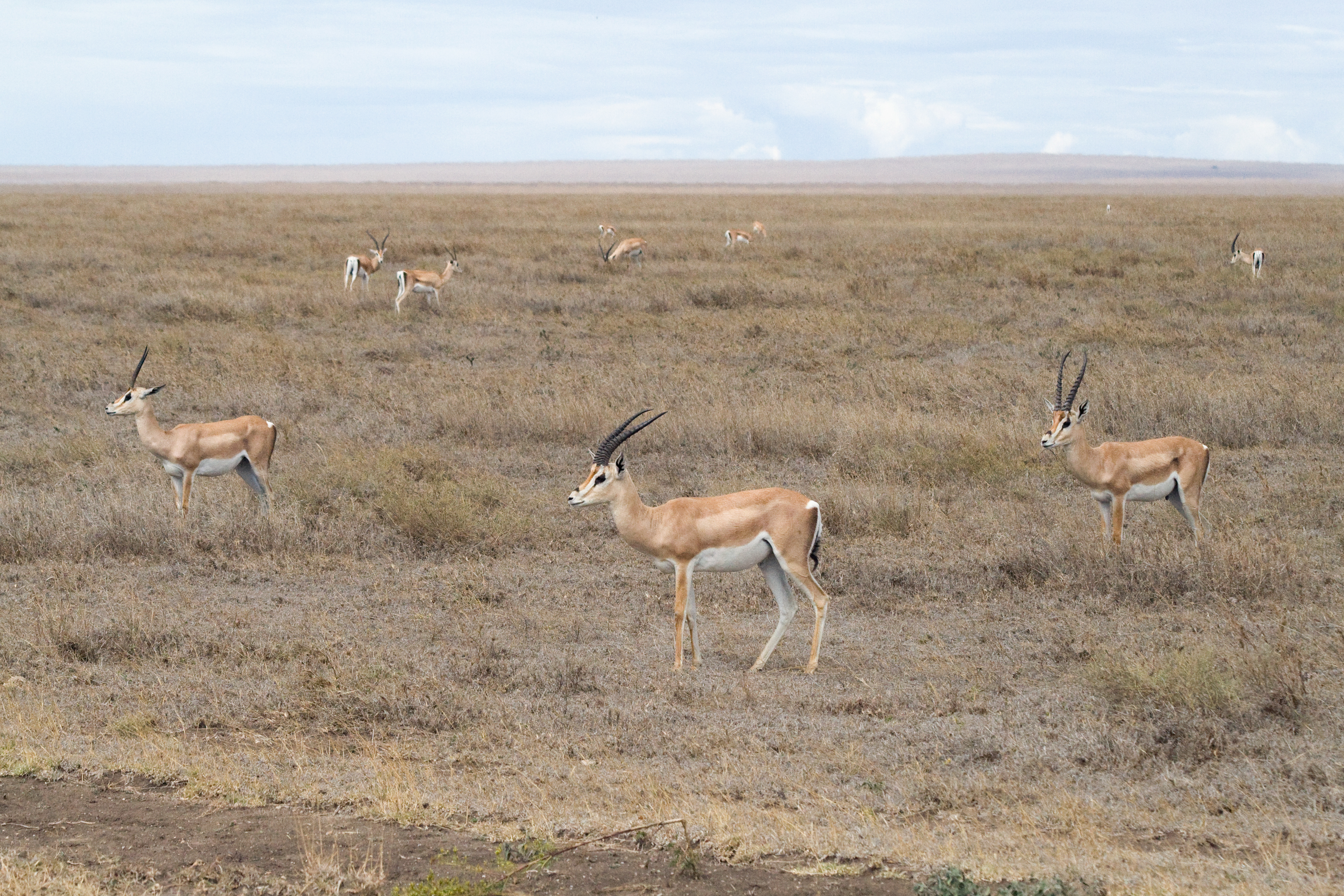
The park has a notable population of Grant's gazelle

Wildlife in the park include plains zebra, Grant's gazelle, dik-dik, hippopotamus, African leopard, spotted hyena, and greater kudu, lion, and cheetah. The park also harbours bushbuck, waterbuck, bushpig, Anubis baboon, vervet monkeys, and black-backed jackal. It also hosted one of the last three populations of Swayne's hartebeest, which is now most certainly extinct, since the last individual was sighted in 2017.

The African wild dog (Lycaon pictus) once existed in the park, but may now be locally extinct due to human population pressures in this region. In 2009, a small group of less than 23 lions were estimated in and around the protected area.

Nechisar National Park is considered an important habitat for birds including kingfishers, storks, pelicans, flamingos and African fish eagles. A stretch of the northwest shore of Lake Chamo is known as Crocodile Market, where hundreds of Nile crocodiles gather to bask.
