= Gedeo language =

Highland East Cushitic language spoken in south central Ethiopia

Gedeo
- ጌዴኡፈ (gedeʾufä)
- Native to: Ethiopia
- Region: Gedeo Zone, Guji Zone
- Ethnicity: Gedeo
- Native speakers: 1.4 million (2018)
- Language family: Afro-Asiatic: Cushitic; Highland East Cushitic; Gedeo
- Writing system: Ge'ez script

Language codes
- ISO 639-3: drs
- Glottolog: gede1246

Gedeo is a Highland East Cushitic language of the Afro-Asiatic family spoken in south central Ethiopia. Alternate names for the language include Derasa, Deresa, Darassa, Geddeo, Derasanya, Darasa. It is spoken by the Gedeo people, who live in the highland area, southwest of Dila and east of Lake Abaya.

The languages has SOV word order. Verbs are marked for person, number, and gender of subject. Verbs are marked for voice: active, causative, middle, and passive.

The New Testament was published in the Gedeo language in 1986, using the Geʽez script.

== Sources ==
- Wedekind, Klaus. 1980. "Sidamo, Gedeo (Derasa), Burji: Phonological differences and likenesses," Journal of Ethiopian Studies 14: 131–76.
- Wedekind, Klaus. 1985. "Gedeo (Derasa) verb morphology and morphophonemics," The verb morphophonemics of five highland east Cushitic languages, including Burji. Afrikanistische Arbeitspapiere 2. Cologne: Institut für Afrikanistik. Pages 82–109.
