= Lake Abaya =

Lake in Southern Ethiopia

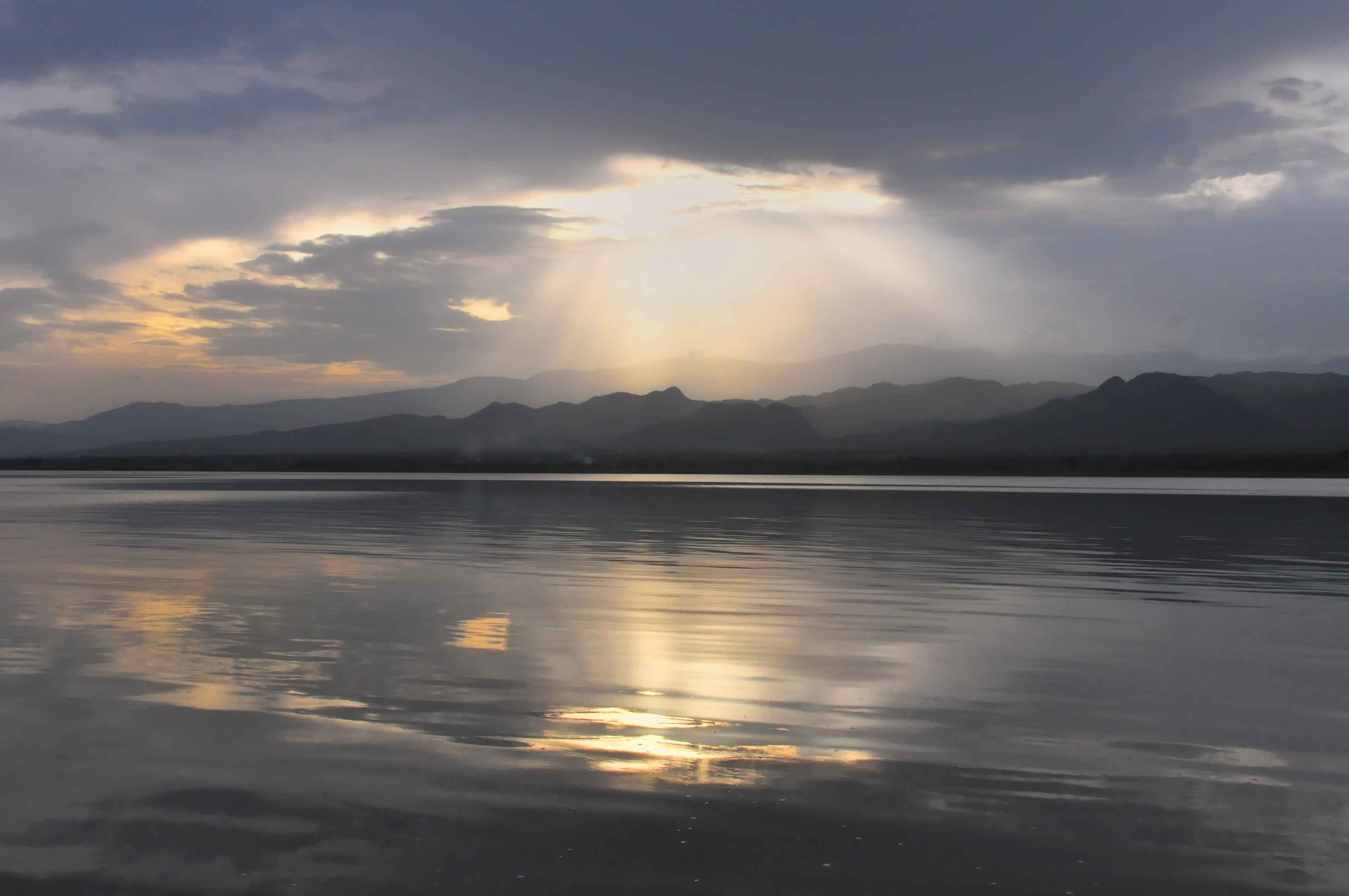

- Location within Ethiopia

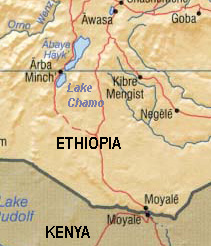
- Coordinates: 6°26′N 37°53′E
- Primary inflows: Bilate River; Gidabo River; Gelana River
- Basin countries: Ethiopia
- Max. length: 60 km (37 mi)
- Max. width: 20 km (12 mi)
- Surface area: 1,162 km^{2} (449 sq mi)
- Average depth: 7.1 m (23 ft)
- Max. depth: 13.1 m (43 ft)
- Water volume: 8.2 km^{3} (2.0 cu mi)
- Surface elevation: 1,175 m (3,855 ft)
- Settlements: Arba Minch

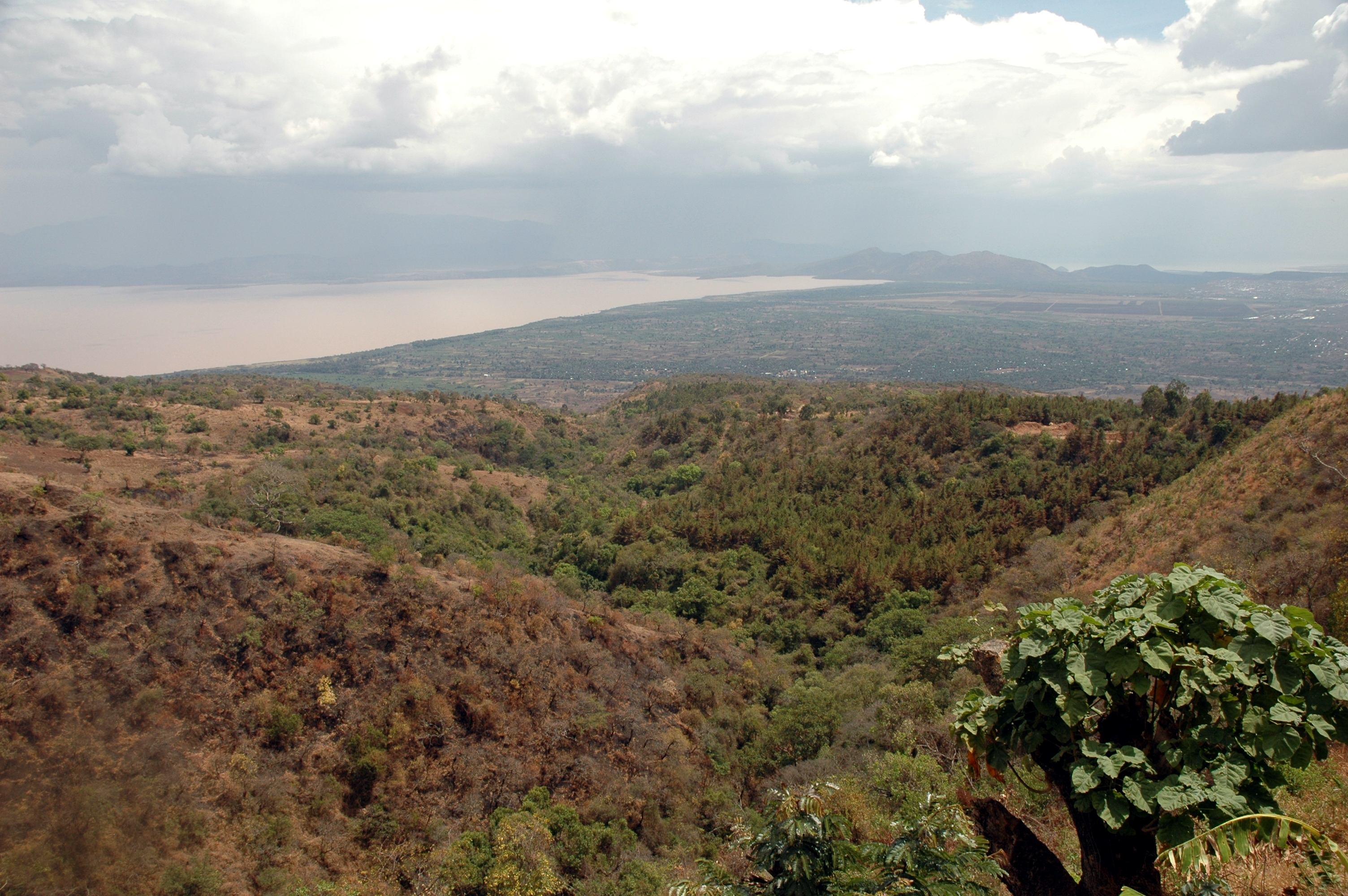
Lake Abaya as seen from a Dorze village. On the far right Arba Minch and Lake Chamo can be seen. Between the two lakes is the Nechisar National Park.

Lake Abaya (Amharic: አባያ ሐይቅ) is a lake in the South Ethiopia Regional State of Ethiopia. It is located in the Main Ethiopian Rift, east of the Guge Mountain.

The town of Arba Minch lies on its southwestern shore, and the southern shores are part of the Nechisar National Park. Just to the south is Lake Chamo. Savanna, known for its wildlife and birdlife, surrounds the lake, which is also fished by local people. According to the Ethiopian Department of Fisheries and Aquaculture, 412 tonnes of fish are landed each year, which the department estimates is 69% of its sustainable amount.

Lake Abaya is 60 kilometers long and 20 wide, with a surface area of 1162 square kilometers. There are a number of islands in this lake, the largest being Aruro; others include Gidicho, Welege, Galmaka, and Alkali. The lake is reddish-brown due to a high load of suspended sediments.

The lake is fed by three medium-sized rivers. First there is the Bilate which rises on the southern slopes of Mount Gurage, then runs mostly southward to drain into Lake Abaya at its northern shore. Second is the Gidabo, which rises on the western slopes of the Bale Mountains, then also runs mostly southwards to drain into Lake Abaya at its northeastern tip after having passed the Gidabo flood plains. The third river is the Gelana, which rises at the western escarpment of the Rift Valley northwest of Bule Hora Town. Tributary streams also rise on the eastern and northern slopes of the Amaro Mountains. The Gelana then flows northwards through the Gelana Graben in the middle between both mountain ranges before it enters the Bore swamps and finally drains on the eastern side into the lake.

The only outflow of the lake is through the lower reaches of Kulfo River directly below an alluvial fan at an elevation of 1,190 m (at 6.0109°N 37.5854°E). The riverbed acts as an spillway in the case of high lake levels and discharges the excess water into Lake Chamo. Usually, the lake level oscillates somewhat, in 2017 it was at 1,175 m, 15 m below the overflow level. In the last 50 years, the lake level has oscillated only ±1.5 m around a mean value which is well below the overflow level. Consequently, the maximum depth of the lake changes only slightly from year to year, in the year 2002 the lake had a maximum depth of 13.1 meters.

In 1896 Lake Abaya was renamed "Lake Margherita" after the Queen Margherita of Savoy, wife of King Humbert I of Italy by the Italian explorer Vittorio Bottego who first explored the region. The name "Lake Margherita" (Lago Margherita) is still used in Italy.

== See also ==
- Rift Valley lakes
