= Gedeo people =

Ethnic group in southern Ethiopia

Gedeo
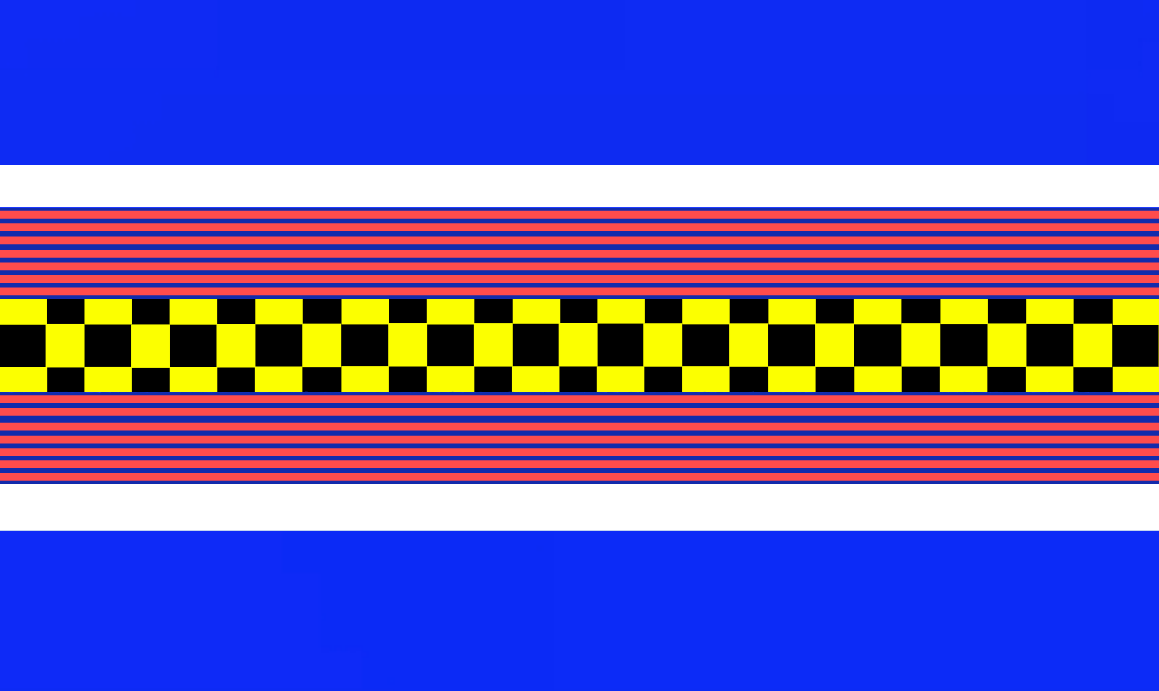
- Gedeo Pattern

Total population
- 986,977 (2007 census)

Regions with significant populations
- Ethiopia

Languages
- Gedeo language, Amharic

Religion
- predominantly Protestant Christianity, Islam, Traditional, Ethiopian Orthodox Christianity

Related ethnic groups
- Guji Oromo, Sidama, Welayta

The Gedeo are an ethnic group in southern Ethiopia. The Gedeo Zone in the South Ethiopia Regional State is named for this people. They speak the Gedeo language, which is one of the Cushitic languages.

== Overview ==
According to the 2007 Ethiopian national census, this ethnic group has 986,977 members, of whom 75.05% live in the SNNPR and 24.84% in adjacent parts of the Oromia Region. Almost one in sixteen—6.24% -- live in urban areas.

== Culture ==
The culture of the Gedeo is distinguished by two features. The first is the baalle, a tradition of ranks and age classes similar to the Gadaa system of the Oromo people. Beckingham and Huntingford describe the system as seven grades that span a 10-year period of birth, creating a 70-year cycle. Asebe Regassa Debelo provides oral traditions showing that the Gedeo acquired the practice from the Guji Oromo, with whom they have had, historically, a close relationship. On the other hand, their agricultural economy is based on cultivating ensete, as is their neighbors the Sidama people, whose language is closely related to theirs. From a geopolitical point of view, the Gedeo are Horners, and from an ethnic point of view, they are Cushites.

== History ==
The origin of the Gedeo is not well known. Tadesse Kippie Kanshie mentions one story in which the Gedeo trace their origin to the aboriginal tribe called Murgga-Gosallo, perhaps the earliest people to have lived in the area. Another Gedeo tradition traces their origins to one Daraso, who was the older brother of Gujo the ancestor of the Guji Oromo, and Boro ancestor of the Borana Oromo, two pastoral groups who live to the east of the Gedeo; this tradition may have its origins in an Oromo practice of mass adoption of indigenous ethnic groups, known as guddifacha. Daraso is said to have had seven sons from two wives, from whom were descended the seven Gedeo clans: Doobba’a, Darashsha, Gorggorshsha, Hanuma, Bakarro, Henbba’a and Logoda. These are organized into two classes or "houses": shoole baxxe (the senior) to which the first four belong and sase baxee (the junior) to which the last three belong. The shoole baxxee comprises more than twenty-five sub-tribes while the sase baxxe consists of ten sub-tribes, all of which are exogamous. To these seven clans specific roles were attributed, which meant only a given clan or sub-clan contributed members from its ranks for the role of leadership while other clans or sub-clans performed duties associated with ritual, traditional medicine, etc. Accordingly, the Aba Gada used to be chosen from the Logoda and Henbba'a clans.

Incorporation into expanding Ethiopia empire in 1895 led to numerous social upheavals. In areas where the Gedeo "submitted peacefully" local administration was not disturbed, but in those that required military action, military governors ruled and at times became feudal lords. The incorporation seriously affected their socio-economic, political and cultural autonomy. For instance, the Gedeo were barred from using their baalle tradition in their day-to-day lives, except in religious rituals, leading to social disintegration, and loosened the social ties amongst the different tribes. Those who fought against the Ethiopian empire had their land confiscated and were reduced to gebbars, the Ethiopian equivalent of serfs. The local landlords, known as naftagna and balabat, were entitled to take one-third (siso) to one-half (gama) of whatever the gebbars produced. The landlords emphasized production of coffee due to its importance as a cash crop—to the benefit of the landlords, not the Gedeo peasantry. On top of this, the gebbars and their families were required to perform unpaid work for the landlords. The gebbars also had to contribute asrat (one-tenth of the total produce) to the Ethiopian Church. The landlord also controlled the social life of a gabbar, requiring them to seek his permission before proposing a marriage for his children or to send his children to school.

However, one authority holds that the greatest administrative action that changed the lives of the Gedeo was during the 1920s when measurement of land through qallad (a rope or leather thong about 66–67 meters long) was introduced. The process of measuring land brought many hitherto unoccupied lands, and formerly forested areas that had been under the control of the traditional authorities, into the hands of the national authorities. This forced the ordinary Gedeo to abandon their traditional lands where they grew ensete (as the landlords claimed rist and maderia rights over measured lands), and towards peripheral areas in search of unoccupied and forested lands. This migration led to assimilation of different clans, eliminated traditional no-man's zones and encouraged clearing of forested areas for the purposes of growing mixed coffee and ensete.

Protestant missionaries arrived in the early 1950s. They established two churches, the Ethiopian Kalehiywot Church and Ethiopian Evangelical Church Mekaneyesus. Of these, the Ethiopian Kalehiywot Church attracted the bulk of the Gedeo population and exerted a far-reaching influence. The missionaries found their evangelical work quite easy, for they had only to substitute the Christian God for the Mageno, the Supreme Being of the Gedeo. Moreover, before the Christian missionaries arrived there was virtually no formal education among the Gedeo. The handful of government schools were in the towns. The missionaries quickly identified this gap and used it to their advantage, establishing Bible and elementary schools. Gedeo were so eager to learn how to read and write, that elementary schools had to offer evening classes for the adults, lit by kerosene lamps. As Tadesse Kippie Kanshie writes, "These schools not only taught religious cadres but also cadres of change."

The landlords, well aware of the consequences, were vehemently opposed to any education of the Gedeo, and worked against the efforts of the missionaries, by limiting their movement in the countryside in various ways. While the missionaries relied on the help of their converts to circumvent the effect of these limitations, the local elites also struck against them. Some, such as Murtti Obese, one of the first converts to evangelize to the Gedeo south of Dila, lost his life in 1970 while in the remote areas of Hagere Mariam woreda, and Tesfaye Argaw was murdered while on a similar mission in the lowlands.

Related to this was the effort of the Gedeo to regain their lost rights. In the 1950s, Gedeo elders were selected and presented a petition to Emperor Haile Selassie in Addis Ababa, but to no avail. The Gedeo clashed with the Ethiopian Army in 1960 at Michille hill near Dilla. With traditional weapons like spears against modern firearms, the Gedeo killed 68 government army and officials, while the latter killed 86 Gedeo peasants, "a small number considering the state’s level of military power," Asebe Regassa Debelo notes with some satisfaction. Nevertheless this defeat led to government persecution of local Protestants. Church leaders were accused of inciting the people against the feudal government and church gatherings were banned. Further, government authorities forcibly resettled Gedeo in Adola, Hagere Mariam (Bule Hora) and other Guji Oromo territories located far from the homelands of the Gedeo. While the fall of Emperor Haile Selassie at first led to improved conditions, such as land reform, but these improvements did not last. Cheating and deceiving had become "normal" ways used by most town merchants in dealing with Gedeo peasants. They were told by Political Commissars when to harvest, when to sell and whom to sell to, and these officials eventually tried to enforce agricultural collectivization on the Gedeo. In response, farmers clashed with government soldiers in 1981 near Rago-Qishsha.

== Politics ==
Besides the baalle system, before their conquest by the Ethiopian Empire in the 1890s, the Gedeo lived in a federation of three territories called Sasserogo, or "three Roga". These Roga, Sobbho, Ributa and Rikuta, shared one Aba Gada, which was similar to the Oromo office, and every eight years was passed to a new office holder in the next age set at a ceremony also known as baalle. According to Gedeo tradition, all leadership positions from Aba Gada at the top down to the office of Hyiticha were assumed at the baalle ceremony, while specific roles were held by specific clans or sub-clans.

When boundary lines were drawn between the new SNNPR and Oromia administrative units during the Transitional Government of Ethiopia, much territory originally belonging to the Guji Oromo, including the Qallu compound (galma) in Wenago, was given to the SNNPR. The local Guji Oromo were dissatisfied with this arrangement, and unsuccessfully appealed the decision to the office of then Prime Minister. This led to violent clashes in Hagere Mariam woreda between the Guji and Gedeo in April–May 1995. The federal army attempted to intervene between the two to stop the fighting, but only succeeded in becoming the target of Guji militants.

=== Gedeo-Oromo clashes ===
Conflict between the Guji Oromo and the Gedeo people in Gedeo Zone since 2018 led to Ethiopia having the largest number of people to flee their homes in the world in 2018, with 45000 newly displaced people.
