= Industrial development policy of Ethiopia =

Between 1950 and 1960, the imperial government of Ethiopia enacted legislation and implemented a new policy to encourage foreign investment in the Ethiopian economy. This new policy provided investor benefits in the form of tax exemptions, remittances of foreign exchange, import and export duty relief, tax exemptions on dividends, and the provision of financing through the Ethiopian Investment Corporation and the Development Bank of Ethiopia. In addition, the government guaranteed protection to industrial enterprises by instituting high tariffs and by banning the importation of commodities that might adversely affect production of domestic goods. Protected items included sugar, textiles, furniture, and metal. The government also participated through direct investment in enterprises that had high capital costs, such as oil refineries and the paper and pulp, glass and bottle, tire, and cement industries. In 1963, with the Second Five-Year Plan under way, the government enacted Proclamation No. 51. The proclamation's objective was to consolidate other investment policies enacted up to that period, to extend benefits to Ethiopian investors (previous legislation had limited the benefits to foreigners only), and to create an Investment Committee that would oversee investment programs. In 1966 the Ethiopian government enacted Proclamation No. 242, which elevated the Investment Committee's status as an advisory council to that of an authorized body empowered to make independent investment decisions. Thus, by the early 1970s, Ethiopia's industrialization policy included a range of fiscal incentives, direct government investment, and equity participation in private enterprises.

The government's policy attracted considerable foreign investment to the industrial sector. For instance, in 1971/72 the share of foreign capital in manufacturing industries amounted to 41 percent of the total paid-up capital. Many foreign enterprises operated as private limited companies, usually as a branch or subsidiary of multinational corporations. The Dutch had a major investment (close to 80 percent) in the sugar industry. Italian and Japanese investors participated in textiles; and Greeks maintained an interest in shoes and beverages. Italian investors also worked in building, construction, and agricultural industries.

== Under the Derg ==
In 1975 the Derg nationalized most industries and subsequently reorganized them into state-owned corporations. On February 7, 1975, the government released a document outlining Ethiopia's new economic policy, which was explicitly socialist in philosophy and intent. The policy identified three manufacturing areas slated for state involvement: basic industries that produced goods serving other industries and that had the capacity to create linkages in the economy; industries that produced essential goods for the general population; and industries that made drugs, medicine, tobacco, and beverages. The policy also grouped areas of the public and private sectors into activities reserved for the state, activities where state and private capital could operate jointly, and activities left to the private sector.

The 1975 nationalization of major industries scared off foreign private investment. Private direct investment, according to the National Bank of Ethiopia, declined from 65 million birr in 1974 to 12 million in 1977. As compensation negotiations between the Ethiopian government and foreign nationals dragged on, foreign investment virtually ceased. The United States Congress invoked the Hickenlooper Amendment, which had the effect of prohibiting the use of United States funds for development purposes until Ethiopia had settled compensation issues with United States nationals. During 1982 and 1983, the Ethiopian government settled claims made by Italian, Dutch, Japanese, and British nationals. Negotiation to settle compensation claims by United States nationals continued until 1985, when Ethiopia agreed to pay about US$ 7 million in installments to compensate United States companies.

Issued in 1983, the Derg's Proclamation No. 235 (the Joint Venture Proclamation) signaled Ethiopia's renewed interest in attracting foreign capital. The proclamation offered incentives such as a five-year period of income tax relief for new projects, import and export duty relief, tariff protection, and repatriation of profits and capital. It limited foreign holdings to a maximum of 49 percent and the duration of any joint venture to twenty-five years. Although the proclamation protected investors' interests from expropriation, the government reserved the right to purchase all shares in a joint venture "for reasons of national interest." The proclamation failed to attract foreign investment, largely because foreign businesses were hesitant to invest in a country whose government recently had nationalized foreign industries without a level of compensation these businesses considered satisfactory.

In 1989 the government issued Special Decree No. 11, a revision of the 1983 proclamation. The decree allowed majority foreign ownership in many sectors, except in those related to public utilities, banking and finance, trade, transportation, and communications, where joint ventures were not allowed. The decree also removed all restrictions on profit repatriation and attempted to provide more extensive legal protection of investors than had the 1983 proclamation.

President Haile Mariam Mengistu's March 1990 speech to the Central Committee of the Workers' Party of Ethiopia was a turning point in Ethiopia's recent economic history. Acknowledging that socialism had failed, Mengistu proposed implementing a mixed economy. Under the new system, the private sector would be able to participate in all parts of the economy with no limit on capital investment (Ethiopia had a US$ 250,000 ceiling on private investment); developers would be allowed to build houses, apartments, and office buildings for rent or sale; and commercial enterprises would be permitted to develop industries, hotels, and a range of other enterprises on government-owned land to be leased on a concessionary basis. Additionally, state-owned industries and businesses would be required to operate on a profit basis, with those continuing to lose money to be sold or closed. Farmers would receive legal ownership of land they tilled and the right to sell their produce in a free market. Whereas there were many areas yet to be addressed, such as privatization of state enterprises and compensation for citizens whose land and property had been confiscated, these proposals generated optimism among some economists about Ethiopia's economic future. However, some observers pointed out that Mengistu's proposals only amounted to recognition of existing practices in the underground economy.

== See also ==
- Economy of Ethiopia
- Foreign aid to Ethiopia
- Manufacturing in Ethiopia
