= Wadera =

Wadera may refer to:

- Wadera, Ethiopia, a town in south-eastern Ethiopia
- Wadera (woreda), a woreda in the Oromia Region of Ethiopia
