= Economy of Ethiopia =

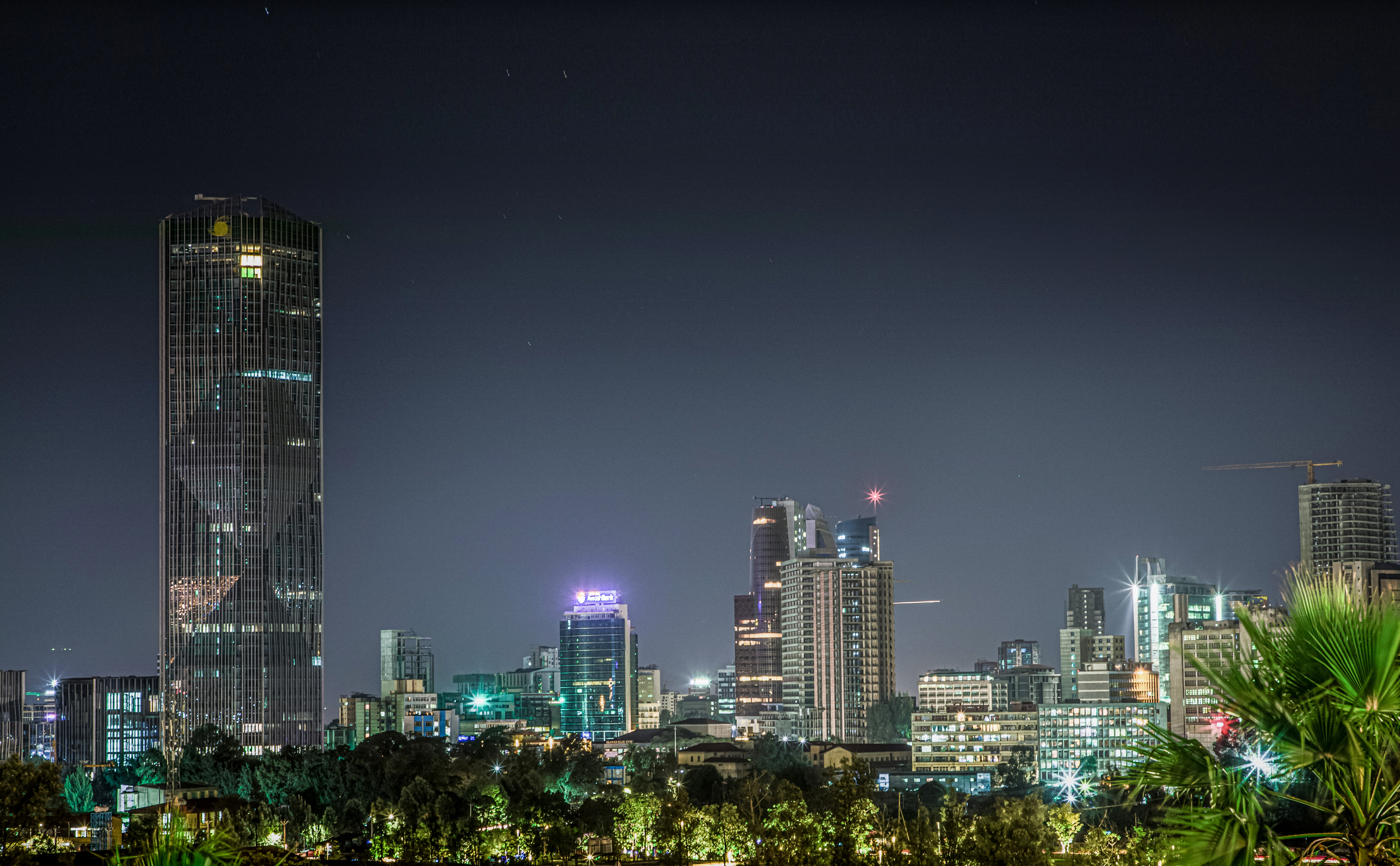
- Addis Ababa, the financial centre of Ethiopia
- Currency: Birr (ETB, ብር)
- Fiscal year: 8 July – 7 July
- Trade organisations: AU, AfCFTA, BRICS, COMESA, IGAD, WTO (observer), G24
- Country group: Least developed; Low-income economy

Statistics
- GDP: ▲$201.42 billion (nominal; 2026); ▲$561.35 billion (PPP; 2025)
- GDP rank: 64th (nominal; 2026); 48rd (PPP; 2026)
- GDP growth: 10.2% (2026f)
- GDP per capita: ▲$1,180 (nominal; 2026); ▲$4,974 (PPP; 2026)
- GDP per capita rank: 170th (nominal; 2025); 157th (PPP; 2025)
- GDP per capita growth: 6.9% (2024)
- GDP by sector: Agriculture: 35.79%; Industry: 24.48%; Services: 36.98%; (2020 est.)
- Inflation (CPI): ▼9.4% (2026 est.)
- Population below national poverty line: ▼20% (2019, World Bank); 32.6% on less than $1.90/day (2015)
- Gini coefficient: 35.0 medium (2015, World Bank); 33.6 (2015)
- Human Development Index: ▲0.498 low (2022); 0.337 low IHDI (2018)
- Corruption Perceptions Index: ▼37 out of 100 points (2023, 98th rank)
- Labour force: ▲61,664,369 (2023); ▲78% employment rate (2023)
- Labour force by occupation: agriculture: 72.7%; industry: 7.4%; services: 19.9%; (2013 est.)
- Unemployment: 3.5% (2022)
- Informal employment: 77.7% (2021)
- Main industries: food processing, beverages, textiles, leather, chemicals, metals processing; & cement

External
- Exports: ▲$16.79 billion (2025 est.)
- Export goods: coffee($2.6billion)]]; gold($3.5billion); khat; leather products; live animals; & oilseeds
- Main export partners: Switzerland: 21%; Somalia: 11%; People's Republic of China: 8%; Sudan: 8% (2025)
- Imports: ▼$23 billion (2025)
- Import goods: Machinery, aircraft; metal and metal products; electrical materials; petroleum products; motor vehicles; chemicals; and fertilizers
- Main import partners: People's Republic of China: 39%; United Arab Emirates: 17%; India: 14%; Saudi Arabia: 10% (2025)
- FDI stock: ▲$31.6 billion (2022 est.) Inflows: $2.43 billion (2021-22 est.)
- Current account: ▲ −US$3.25 billion (2.6% of GDP, 2024 est.)
- Gross external debt: ▲$52.21 billion (2022 est.)

Public finance
- Government debt: ▼41.1% of GDP (2024 est.)
- Foreign reserves: ▲$15.9 billion (FY 2024 est.)
- Revenue: ▲$26.18billion (2022.est)
- Spending: ▲$26.8 billion (2022 est.)
- Credit rating: Standard & Poor's: B (Foreign currency ratings); B (Local currency ratings); B (T&C assessment), Moody's: B1 (Outlook stable); Fitch: B (Outlook stable)
- All values, unless otherwise stated, are in US dollars.

Ethiopia has a mixed transition economy with a large public sector. The government of the Federal Republic of Ethiopia is in the process of privatizing many of the state-owned businesses and moving toward a market economy. The banking, telecommunication and transportation sectors of the economy are influenced by government-owned companies.

It has one of the fastest-growing economies in the world and is Africa's second most populous country. Many properties owned by the government during the previous regime have now been privatized or are in the process of privatization and the liberalization of its financial sector in the near future. However, certain sectors such as telecommunications, financial and insurance services, air and land transportation services, and retail, are considered to be strategic sectors and are expected to remain under state control for the foreseeable future.

Almost 50% of Ethiopia's population is under the age of 18. Even though education enrollment at primary and tertiary level has increased significantly, job creation has not caught up with the increased number of secondary and postsecondary educational graduates. The country must create hundreds of thousands of jobs every year just to keep up with population growth.

In 2023, Ethiopia reached an estimated GDP of 156.1 billion nominal dollars and an estimated PPP of 393.85 billion dollars. This mostly comes from a services-based economy with agriculture. In the latest data from 2019 Ethiopia's top trading partners globally included China, the United States, UAE, France, the United Kingdom, South Korea, Saudi Arabia, Germany, Japan, Switzerland, the Netherlands, Belgium, Turkey, India, and Egypt. In 2021, agriculture made up 37.5% of the country's economic output, while services 36.25% and industry made up 21.85% of the economy. Ethiopia's economy is ranked 159th place out of 190 countries in 'Ease of doing business'. Ethiopia is also a part of African Continental Free Trade Area, Common Market for Eastern and Southern Africa, Intergovernmental Authority on Development, and the G24, and has observer status at the World Trade Organization. Ethiopia joined the BRICS economic alliance in January 2024.

In terms of terms of foreign direct investment, Ethiopia attracted US$4.32 billion during the 2025/26 fiscal year.

While Ethiopia does not currently have a stock exchange, it did have one in the past during the reign of Emperor Haile Selassie I, called an 'ākisīyoni gebeya.' It now has a commodity exchange in Addis Ababa called the Ethiopia Commodity Exchange, established in 2008.

The Ethiopian economy has a large foreign debt, with an overall external debt of 28 billion US dollars. China owns over 13 billion dollars of its debt. Its debt to GDP ratio is smaller than similar and neighboring countries. Ethiopia currently has 2.4 billion dollars of foreign reserves, representing a decline compared to previous years.

Ethiopia expects to reach a national middle-income status by 2025. Despite this, based on the most recent data from 2019, 68.7% of the population continues to be affected by multidimensional poverty and an additional 18.4% vulnerable to it.

== History ==
Development of GDP per capita

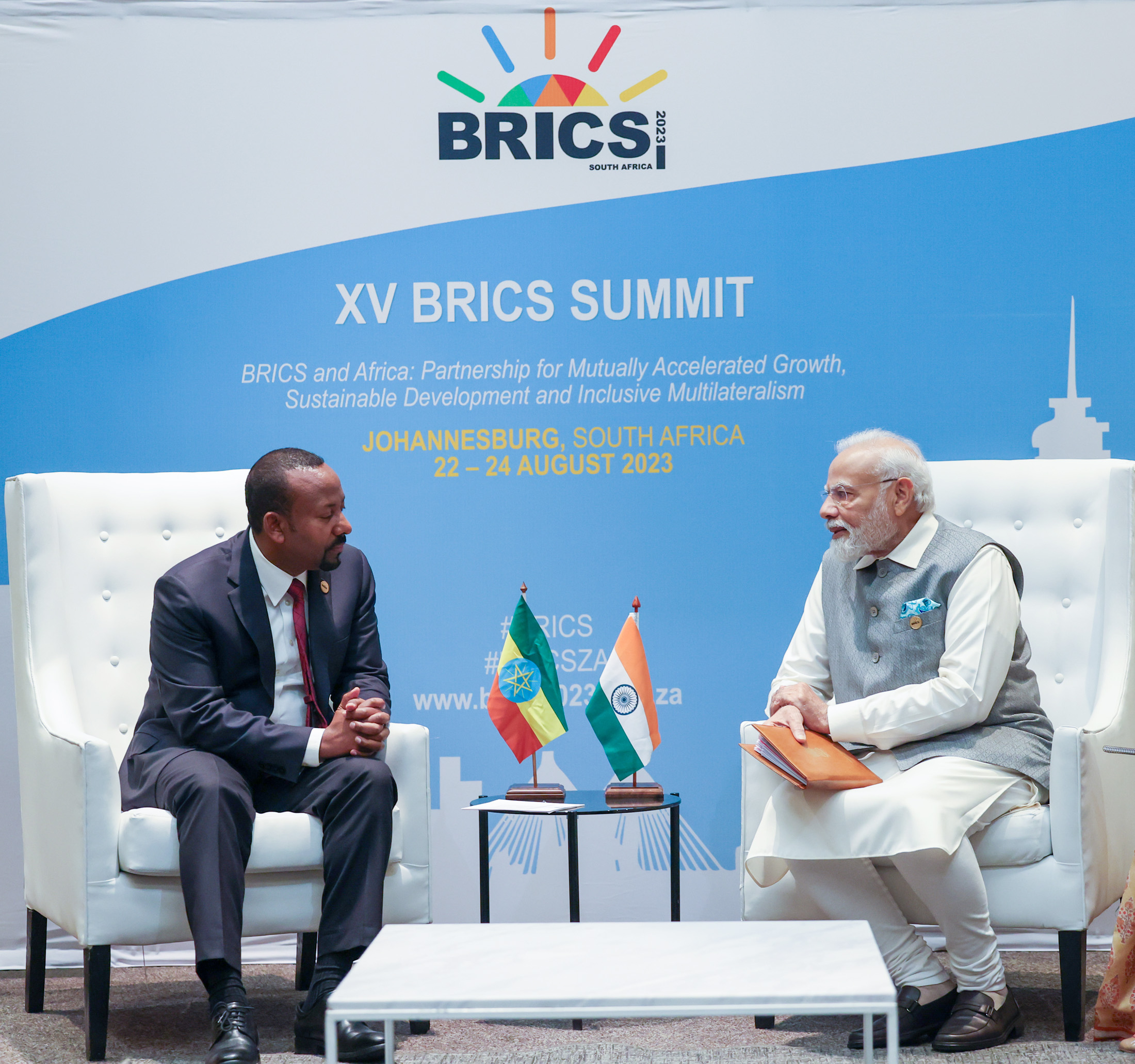
Ethiopian Prime Minister Ahmed with Indian counterpart Prime Minister Narendra Modi meeting for Ethiopia's admission to the alliance

Ethiopia's resources have enabled the country—unlike most sub-Saharan African countries—to maintain contacts with the outside world for centuries. Since ancient times, Ethiopian traders exchanged gold, ivory, musk, and wild animal skins for salt and luxury goods, such as silk and velvet. By the late nineteenth century, coffee had become one of Ethiopia's more important cash crops. At that time, most trade flowed along two major trade routes, both of which terminated in the far southwest in the Kefa-Jima region. From there, one route went north to Mitsiwa via Gonder and Adwa, the other along the Awash River valley to Harer and then on to Berbera or Zeila on the Red Sea.

Ethiopia lost its status as a great trading state after the fall of Axum. Most Ethiopians came to despise traders, preferring instead to emulate the country's legendary warriors and priests. After establishing a foothold in the country, Greek, Armenian, and Arab traders became the economic intermediaries between Ethiopia and the outside world. Arabs also settled in the interior and eventually dominated all commercial activity except petty trade.

When their occupation of Ethiopia ended in 1941, the Italians left behind them a country whose economic structure was much as it had been for centuries. There had been some improvements in communications, particularly in the area of road building, and attempts had been made to establish a few small industries and to introduce commercial farming, particularly in Eritrea, which Italy had occupied since 1890. But these changes were limited. With only a small proportion of the population participating in the monetized economy, trade consisted mostly of barter. Wage labor was limited, economic units were largely self-sufficient, foreign trade was negligible, and the market for manufactured goods was extremely small.

During the late 1940s and 1950s, much of the economy remained unchanged. The government focused its development efforts on expansion of the bureaucratic structure and ancillary services. Most farmers cultivated small plots of land or herded cattle. Traditional and primitive farming methods provided the population with a subsistence standard of living. In addition, many nomadic peoples raised livestock and moved seasonally in drier areas. The agricultural sector grew slightly, and the industrial sector represented a small part of the total economy.

By the early 1950s, Emperor Haile Selassie I (reigned 1930–74) had renewed calls for a transition from a subsistence economy to an agro-industrial economy. To accomplish this task, Ethiopia needed infrastructure to develop resources, a material base to improve living conditions, and better health, education, communications, and other services. A key element of the emperor's new economic policy was the adoption of centrally administered development plans.

The First Five-Year Plan (1957–1961) sought to develop strong infrastructure, particularly in transportation, construction, and communications, to link isolated regions. The Second Five-Year Plan (1962–1967) signaled the start of a 20-year program to change Ethiopia's predominantly agricultural economy to an agro-industrial one. The Third Five-Year Plan (1968–1973) also sought to facilitate Ethiopia's economic well-being by raising manufacturing and agro-industrial performance. However, unlike its predecessors, the third plan expressed the government's willingness to expand educational opportunities and to improve peasant agriculture.

During the First Five-Year Plan, the gross national product (GNP) increased at a 3.2 percent annual rate as opposed to the projected figure of 3.7 percent, and growth in economic sectors such as agriculture, manufacturing, and mining failed to meet the national plan's targets. The Planning Commission never assessed the performance of the Second Five-Year Plan and Third Five-Year Plan, largely because of a shortage of qualified personnel. However, according to data from the Ethiopian government's Central Statistical Authority, during the 1960/61 to 1973/74 period the economy achieved sustained economic growth. Between 1960 and 1970, Ethiopia enjoyed an annual 4.4 percent average growth rate in per capita gross domestic product (GDP). Relative to its neighbors, Ethiopia's economic performance was mixed.

By the early 1970s, Ethiopia's economy not only had started to grow but also had begun to diversify into areas such as manufacturing and services. However, these changes failed to improve the lives of most Ethiopians. About four-fifths of the population were subsistence farmers who lived in poverty because they used most of their meager production to pay taxes, rents, debt payments, and bribes.

The 1974 revolution resulted in the nationalization and restructuring of the Ethiopian economy. After the revolution, the country's economy can be viewed as having gone through four phases. Internal political upheaval, armed conflict, and radical institutional reform marked the 1974-78 period of the revolution. There was little economic growth; instead, the government's nationalization measures and the highly unstable political climate caused economic dislocation in sectors such as agriculture and manufacturing. As a result of these problems, GDP increased at an average annual rate of only 0.4 percent.

In the second phase (1978–1980), the economy began to recover as the government consolidated power and implemented institutional reforms. More important, security conditions improved as internal and external threats subsided. GDP grew at an average annual rate of 5.7 percent.

In the third phase (1980–1985), the economy experienced a setback. Except for Ethiopian fiscal year (EFY) 1982/83, the growth of GDP declined. Manufacturing took a downturn as well, and agriculture reached a crisis stage, particularly due to drought that lead to widespread famine.

In the fourth period (1985–1990), the economy continued to stagnate. GDP and the manufacturing sector also grew during this period, GDP increasing at an average annual rate of 5 percent. However, the lingering effects of the 1984-85 drought undercut these achievements and contributed to the economy's overall stag.

Since 1991, the Ethiopian government has embarked on a program of economic reform, including privatization of state enterprises and rationalization of government regulation. While the process is still ongoing, the reforms have attracted foreign direct investment.

In 2015, Ethiopia has 2,700 millionaires, a number that has more than doubled since 2007. Their fortunes are mainly built-in niches of economic rents (banks, mines, etc.) without investing in structural and strategic sectors (industrial production, infrastructure, etc.) and should in no way promote economic development or represent a source of competition for Western multinationals.

The Ethiopian government is stepping up its efforts to attract foreign investors, particularly in the textile sector. They can now import their machines without customs duties, benefit from a tax exemption for ten years, pay rents much lower than market prices, and use very inexpensive water and electricity. Major brands have established themselves in the country, such as Decathlon, H&M, and Huajian. These companies also benefit from a cheap labor force, with a monthly salary of around 35 euros. Finally, trade agreements between Ethiopia and the European Union allow them to export duty-free.

== Sectors ==
=== Agriculture, forestry and fishing ===
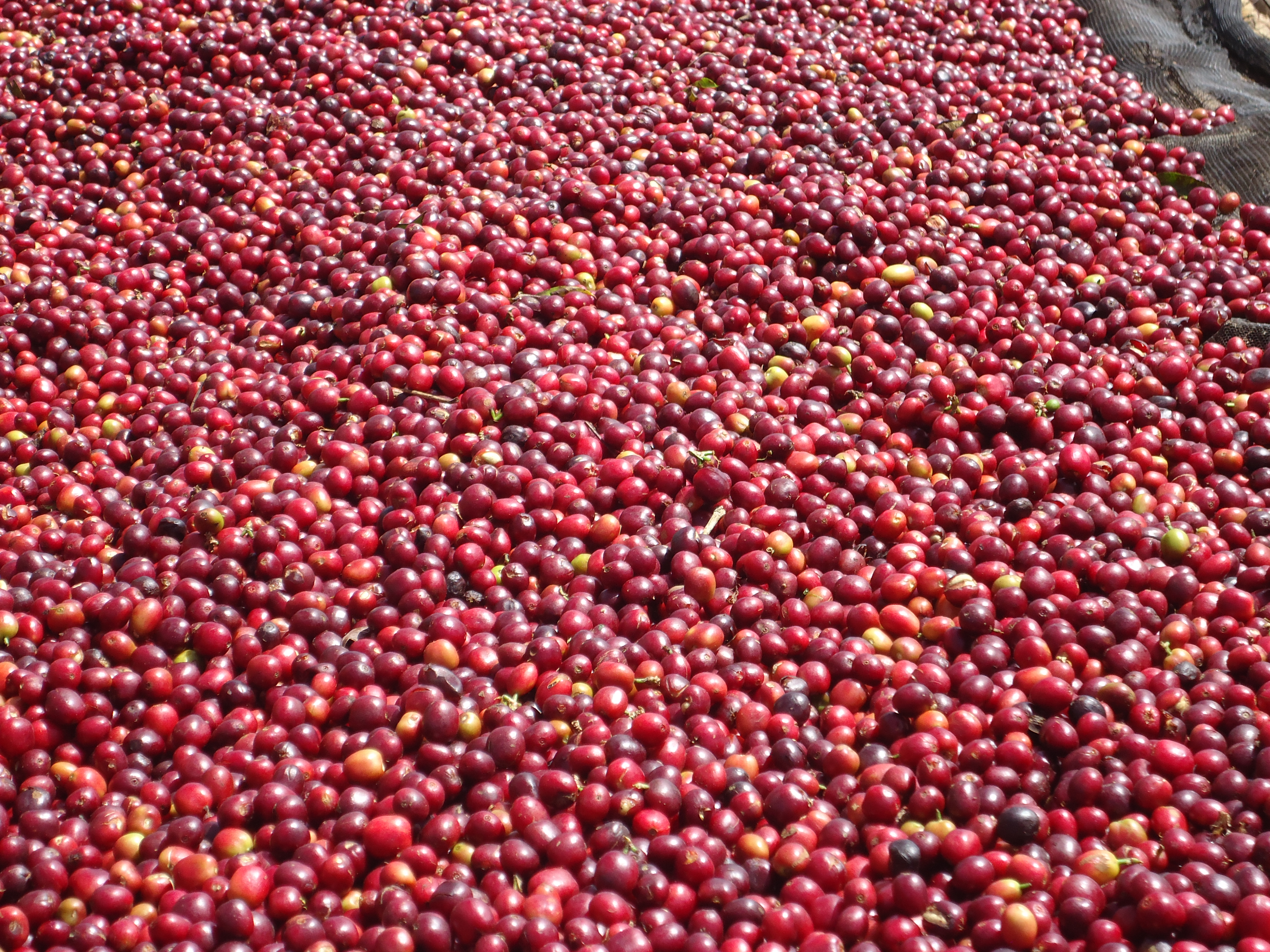
Coffee sorting process is huge since Ethiopia exports over a billion dollars' worth of coffee globally

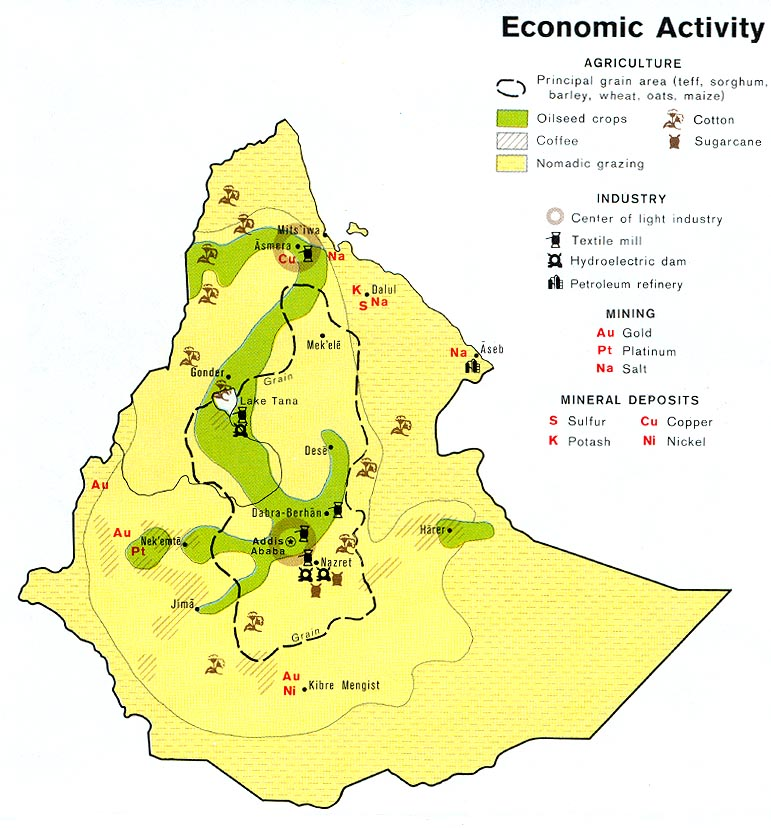
Map of economic activities in Ethiopia and Eritrea (1976)

As of 2023, agriculture accounts for almost 36% of GDP, 81 percent of exports, and 73 percent of the labour force. Many other economic activities depend on agriculture, including marketing, processing, and export of agricultural products. Production is overwhelmingly of a subsistence nature, and a large part of commodity exports are provided by the small agricultural cash-crop sector. Principal crops include coffee, pulses (e.g., beans), oilseeds, cereals, potatoes, sugarcane, and vegetables. Exports are almost entirely agricultural commodities, with coffee as the largest foreign exchange earner, and its flower industry becoming a new source of revenue: for 2005/2006 (the latest year available) Ethiopia's coffee exports represented 0.9% of the world exports, and oilseeds and flowers each representing 0.5%. Ethiopia is Africa's second biggest maize producer. In 2000, Ethiopia's livestock contributed to 19% of total GDP.

As of 2008, some countries that import most of their food, such as Saudi Arabia, have begun planning the purchase and development of large tracts of arable land in developing countries such as Ethiopia. This land grabbing has raised fears of food being exported to more prosperous countries while the local population faces its own shortage.

Forest products are mainly logs used in construction. The silvicultural products are used in construction and manufacturing, and as energy sources. Ethiopia's fisheries are entirely fresh water, as it has no marine coastline. Although total production has been continuously increasing since 2007, the fishing industry is a very small part of the economy. Fishing is predominantly artisanal. In 2014, nearly 45,000 fishermen were employed in the sector with only 30% of them employed full-time.

In 2018, Ethiopia produced the following goods:

- 7.3 million tons of maize (17th largest producer in the world)
- 4.9 million tons of sorghum (4th largest producer in the world)
- 4.2 million tons of wheat
- 2.1 million tons of barley (17th largest producer in the world)
- 1.8 million tons of sweet potato (5th largest producer in the world)
- 1.4 million tons of sugar cane
- 1.3 million tons of yam (5th largest producer in the world)
- 988 thousand tons of broad bean
- 982 thousand tons of millet
- 743 thousand tons of potato
- 599 thousand tons of vegetable
- 515 thousand tons of chick pea (6th largest producer in the world)
- 508 thousand tons of banana
- 470 thousand tons of coffee (6th largest producer in the world)
- 446 thousand tons of cabbage
- 374 thousand tons of pea (20th largest producer in the world)
- 322 thousand tons of onion
- 301 thousand tons of sesame seed (7th largest producer in the world)
- 294 thousand tons of bell pepper
- 172 thousand tons of lentil (11th largest producer in the world)
- 144 thousand tons of rice
- 143 thousand tons of peanut
- 140 thousand tons of cotton
- 124 thousand tons of garlic
- 102 thousand tons of mango (including mangosteen and guava)
- 101 thousand tons of linseed (7th largest producer in the world)

=== Textile industry ===
Employees of Ethiopian garment factories, who work for brands such as Guess, H&M or Calvin Klein, receive a monthly salary of 26 dollars per month. These very low wages have led to low productivity, frequent strikes and high turnover. Some factories have replaced all their employees on average every 12 months, according to a 2019 report of the Stern Centre for Business and Human Rights at New York University.

=== Minerals and mining ===
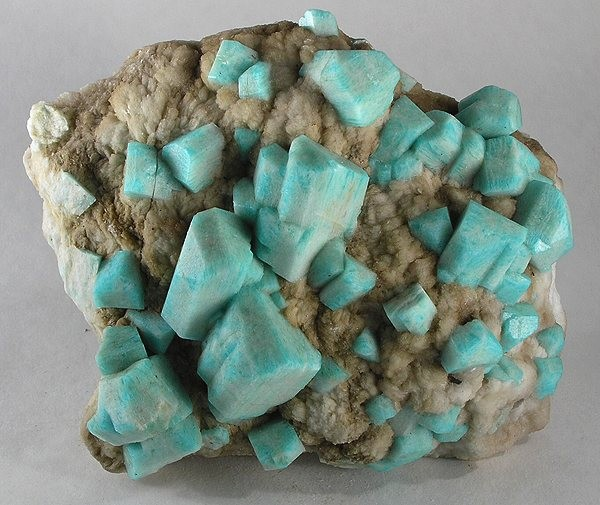
Microcline from the Kenticha mine, Oromia Region, Ethiopia.

Mining is important to the economy of Ethiopia as a diversification from agriculture. Currently, mining comprises only 1% of GDP. Gold, gemstones (diamonds and sapphires), and industrial minerals are important commodities for the country's export-oriented growth strategy.

The country has deposits of coal, opal, gemstones, kaolin, iron ore, soda ash, and tantalum, but only gold is mined in significant quantities. In Salt extraction from salt beds in the Afar Depression, as well as from salt springs in Dire and Afder districts in the south, is only of internal importance and only a negligible amount is exported.

Tantalum mining has also been profitable. It was reported that in the late 1980s, the mineral industry lacked importance given that it contributed less than 0.2 percent of Ethiopia's GDP. Mining for gold is a key development sector in the country. Gold export, which was just US$5 million in 2001, has recorded a large increase to US$602 million in 2012. 2001 gold production amounted to some 3.4 tons.

=== Energy ===
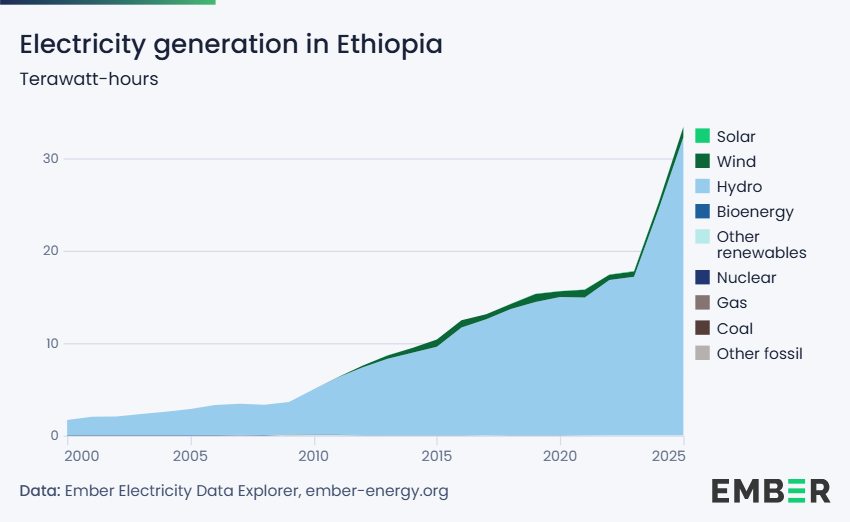
Electricity generation in Ethiopia in terawatt-hours

Waterpower and forests are Ethiopia's main energy sources. The country derives about 90 percent of its electricity needs from hydropower, which means that electricity generation, as with agriculture, is dependent on abundant rainfall. Present installed capacity is rated at about 2000 megawatts, with planned expansion to 10,000 megawatts. In general, Ethiopians rely on forests for nearly all of their energy and construction needs; the result has been deforestation of much of the highlands during the last three decades. Ethiopia has set out plans to invest $40 billion to 71 energy projects by 2030 Less than one-half of Ethiopia's towns and cities are connected to the national grid. Petroleum requirements are met via imports of refined products, although some oil is being hauled overland from Sudan. Oil exploration in Ethiopia has been underway for decades, ever since Emperor Haile Selassie I granted a 50-year concession to SOCONY-Vacuum in September 1945.

Recent oil and gas discoveries across East Africa have seen the region emerge as a new player in the global oil and gas industry. As exciting as the huge gas fields of East Africa are, however, the strong decline in oil prices and expectations for an L-shaped recovery with low prices over the coming years are increasingly challenging the economic viability of the industry in this region. The reserves are estimated at 4 trillion cubic feet (110×10^{9} m^{3}), while exploration for gas and oil is underway in the Gambela Region bordering South Sudan. The discoveries were expected to drive billions of dollars in annual investment to the region over the next decade. According to BMI estimates, the findings in the last few years are more than that of any other region in the world, and the discoveries are expected to continue for the next few years. However, falling global oil prices are threatening the commercial viability of many of these gas prospects.

=== Manufacturing ===
A program to privatize state-owned enterprises has been underway since the late 1990s. There has been a large growth of manufacturing in Ethiopia. Several industrial parks have been built with a focus on textiles.

=== Transport ===
Prior to the outbreak of the 1998–2000 Eritrean–Ethiopian War, landlocked Ethiopia mainly relied on the seaports of Asseb and Massawa in Eritrea for international trade.

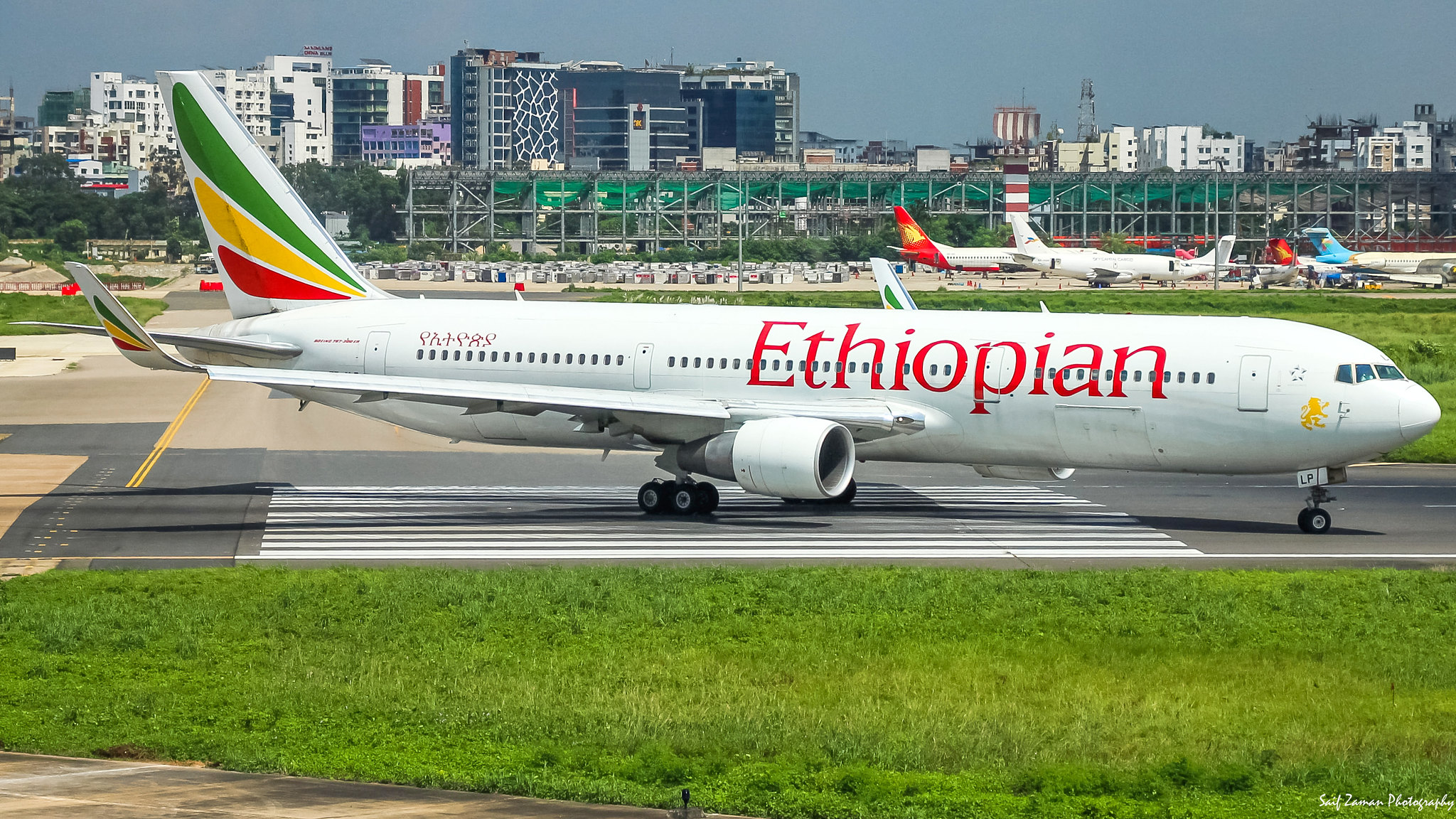
Ethiopian Airlines is the largest airline in Africa, and one of the highest grossing airlines in the world with a revenue over 5 billion USD.

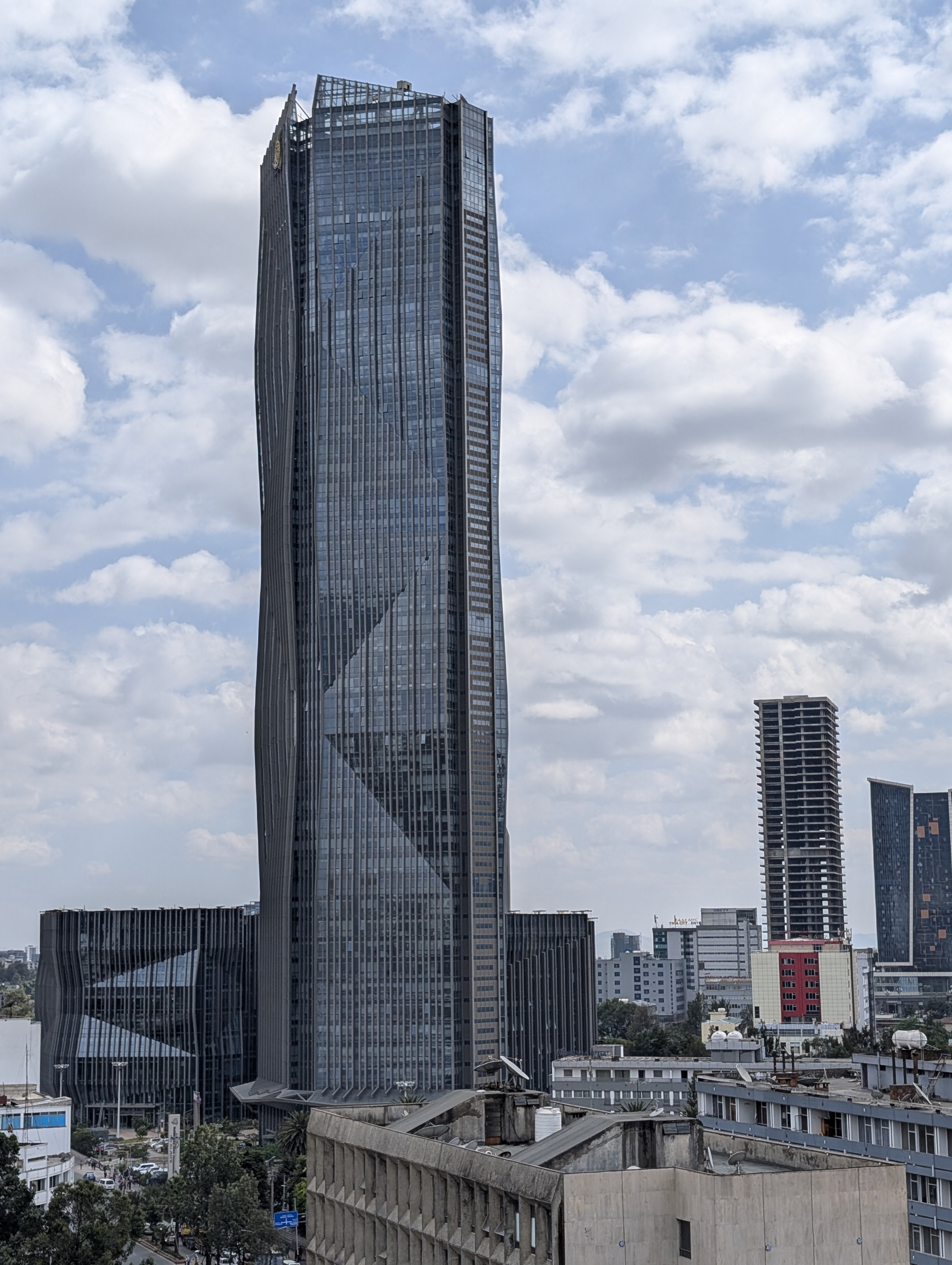
The largest bank in Ethiopia, the commercial bank's headquarters in Addis Ababa.

As of 2005, Ethiopia uses the ports of Djibouti, connected to Addis Ababa by the Addis Ababa – Djibouti Railway, and to a lesser extent Port Sudan in Sudan. In May 2005, the Ethiopian government began negotiations to use the port of Berbera in Somaliland.

By 2030, the government expects a $74 billion investment in transportation.

==== Road ====
As of 2016, there are 113,066 kilometres (70,256 mi) all-weather roads.

==== Air ====
Ethiopian Airlines is Africa's largest and most profitable airline. It serves 132 destinations with a fleet of 141 aircraft.

==== Rail ====
The Ethiopian railway network has been rapidly expanding. In 2015, the first light rail in Africa was opening in Addis Ababa. In 2017, the electric Addis Ababa-Djibouti railway began operations. Presently, two other electric railways are under construction: Awash-Woldiya and Woldiya-Mekelle.

=== Telecommunications and technology ===
Telecommunications were historically provided by a state-owned monopoly, Ethio Telecom, formerly the Ethiopian Telecommunications Corporation. However, on October, 2022, Safaricom Telecommunications Ethiopia launched its telecommunications services, becoming the first private operator in the country.

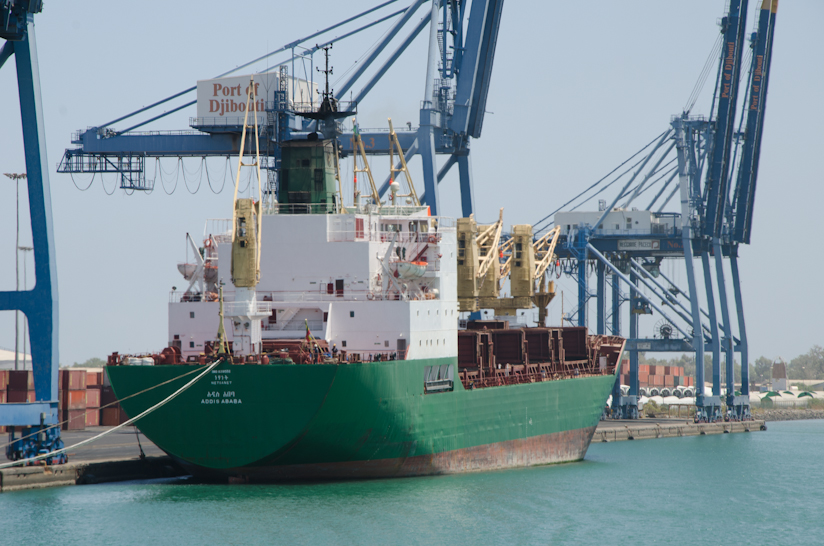
Ethiopian shipment cargo ship, docked in Djibouti

In 2020, ministers set out a national transformation strategy called Digital Ethiopia 2025. Its aim is to prepare the country for the development of an economy based on digital technology.

=== Tourism ===
The services sector consists almost entirely of tourism, with additional economic opportunity in wholesale and retail trade, transportation, and communications. Developed in the 1960s, tourism declined greatly during the late 1970s and the 1980s under the military government. Recovery began in the 1990s, but growth has been constrained by the lack of suitable hotels and other infrastructure, the impact of drought, the 1998–2000 war with Eritrea, and the specter of terrorism. In 2002 more than 156,000 tourists entered the country, many of them Ethiopians visiting from abroad, spending more than US$77 million. In 2008, the number of tourists entering the country had increased to 330,000. A decade later, in 2019, Ethiopia registered a record of 812,000 tourists visiting the country, bringing a revenue of $3.55 bn (4.2 percent of the gross national product). In 2015, Ethiopia was ranked the "World's Best Tourist Destination" by the European Council on Tourism and Trade.

== Macroeconomic trends ==
Share of world GDP (PPP)
Year	Share
1980	0.08%
1990	0.07%
2000	0.07%
2010	0.10%
2017	0.16%
2026	0.25%

The following table displays the trend of Ethiopia's gross domestic product at market prices, according to estimates by the International Monetary Fund with figures in millions of Ethiopian Birr.

Year	Gross Domestic Product	GDP (USD)	US Dollar
	Birr (millions)	per capita	Exchange
1980	14,665	190	2.06 Birr
1990	25,011	257	2.06 Birr
1995	47,560	148	5.88 Birr
2000	64,398	124	8.15 Birr
2005	106,473	169	8.65 Birr
2006	131,672	202	8.39 Birr
2007	171,834	253	8.93 Birr
2008	245,973	333	9.67 Birr
2009	386,215	398	12.39 Birr
2010	427,026	361	13.33 Birr
2017	1,832,786	823	
2020	3,374,349	969	
2023	8,499,779	1,473	

The current GDP (USD) per capita of Ethiopia shrank by 43% in the 1990s. The economy saw continuous real GDP growth of at least 5% since 2004.

The following table shows the main economic indicators in 1980–2026. Inflation below 5% is in green.

Year	GDP (in bn. US$ PPP)	GDP per capita (in US$ PPP)	GDP (in bn. US$ nominal)	GDP growth (real)	Inflation rate (in Percent)	Government debt (in % of GDP)
1980	11.9	367	7.4	▲4.0%	▲12.4%	n/a
1981	▲13.0	▲393	▲7.6	n/a	▲1.9%	n/a
1982	▲14.0	▲409	▲8.0	▲1.0%	▲7.8%	n/a
1983	▲15.7	▲445	▲8.9	▲7.8%	▲3.6%	n/a
1984	▲15.9	▼436	▼8.4	▼−2.3%	▼−0.3%	n/a
1985	▼14.5	▼386	▲9.8	▼−11.4%	▲18.4%	n/a
1986	▲16.2	▲418	▲10.2	▲9.7%	▲5.5%	n/a
1987	▲18.9	▲472	▲10.9	▲13.9%	▼−9.1%	n/a
1988	▲19.7	▲476	▲11.3	▲0.6%	▲2.2%	n/a
1989	▲20.4	▲476	▲11.9	▼−0.5%	▲9.6%	n/a
1990	▲21.7	▲491	▲12.6	▲2.6%	▲5.2%	n/a
1991	▼20.8	▼455	▲13.9	▼−7.2%	▲20.9%	n/a
1992	▼19.4	▼410	▲14.7	▼−8.9%	▲21.0%	87.9%
1993	▲22.5	▲460	▼9.1	▲13.4%	▲10.0%	▲141.0%
1994	▲23.8	▲470	▼8.1	▲3.5%	▲1.2%	▲155.2%
1995	▲25.8	▲494	▼7.9	▲6.1%	▲13.4%	▼146.6%
1996	▲29.8	▲554	▲8.8	▲13.5%	▲0.9%	▼132.8%
1997	▲31.2	▲563	▼8.6	▲2.8%	▼−6.4%	▼80.3%
1998	▼30.2	▼531	▼7.8	▼−4.2%	▲3.6%	▲89.3%
1999	▲32.6	▲557	▼7.5	▲6.3%	▲7.9%	▲97.8%
2000	▲36.6	▲609	▲8.2	▲9.8%	▲0.7%	▼93.6%
2001	▲40.2	▲652	▼8.1	▲7.4%	▼−8.2%	▲97.3%
2002	▲41.5	▲656	▼7.8	▲1.6%	▲1.7%	▲107.4%
2003	▼41.4	▼638	▲8.6	▼−2.1%	▲17.8%	▼103.7%
2004	▲47.5	▲714	▲10.1	▲11.7%	▲3.2%	▼103.1%
2005	▲55.1	▲808	▲12.4	▲12.6%	▲11.7%	▼78.2%
2006	▲63.4	▲905	▲15.3	▲11.5%	▲13.6%	▲79.6%
2007	▲72.8	▲1,005	▲19.3	▲11.8%	▲17.2%	▼55.7%
2008	▲82.5	▲1,101	▲26.3	▲11.2%	▲44.4%	▲56.1%
2009	▲91.3	▲1,188	▲28.7	▲10.0%	▲8.5%	▼30.0%
2010	▲102.2	▲1,296	▼26.9	▲10.6%	▲8.1%	▲39.4%
2011	▲116.2	▲1,439	▲30.5	▲11.4%	▲33.2%	▲44.6%
2012	▲128.6	▲1,555	▲42.2	▲8.7%	▲24.1%	▼39.4%
2013	▲143.8	▲1,695	▲46.5	▲9.9%	▲8.1%	▲44.1%
2014	▲161.3	▲1,854	▲54.2	▲10.3%	▲7.4%	▲44.2%
2015	▲179.8	▲2,017	▲63.1	▲10.4%	▲9.6%	▲50.7%
2016	▲196.0	▲2,149	▲72.1	▲8.0%	▲6.6%	▲51.8%
2017	▲219.9	▲2,354	▲76.8	▲10.2%	▲10.7%	▲55.3%
2018	▲236.1	▲2,472	▲80.2	▲7.7%	▲13.8%	▲58.4%
2019	▲259.5	▲2,659	▲92.6	▲9.0%	▲15.8%	▼54.7%
2020	▲286.2	▲2,870	▲96.6	▲6.1%	▲20.4%	▼53.2%
2021	▲316.1	▲3,103	▲99.3	▲6.3%	▲26.8%	▲53.8%
2022	▲360.2	▲3,460	▲119.0	▲6.4%	▲33.9%	▼46.9%
2023	▲400.3	▲3,787	▲159.8	▲7.2%	▲30.2%	▼38.7%
2024	▲443.3	▲4,089	▼142.1	▲8.1%	▲21.0%	▼33.4%
2025	▲497.5	▲4,499	▼109.1	▲9.2%	▲13.2%	▲43.1%
2026	▲558.9	▲4,974	▲121.5	▲9.2%	▲11.8%	▼40.4%

Ethiopia's economy experienced strong, broad-based growth averaging 9.4% a year from 2010/11 to 2019/20. Ethiopia's real gross domestic product (GDP) growth slowed down to 6.1% in 2019/20 due to the COVID-19 pandemic. Industry, mainly construction, and services accounted for most of the growth. Agriculture was not affected by the COVID-19 pandemic and its contribution to growth slightly improved in 2019/20 compared to the previous year. Private consumption and public investment explain demand-side growth, the latter assuming an increasingly important role.

=== Poverty ===
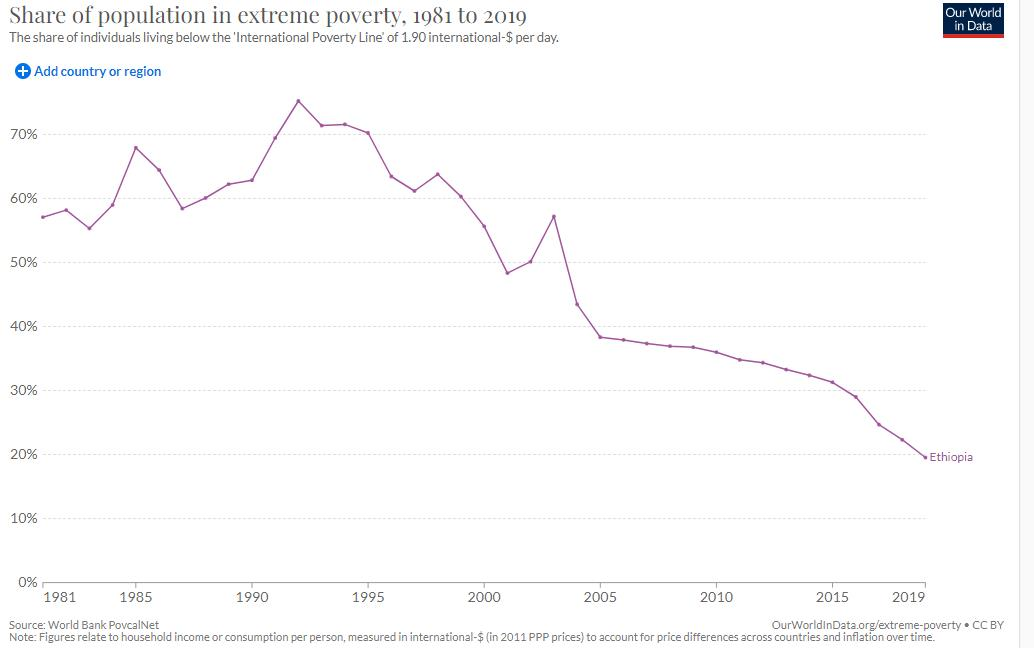
Share of population in extreme poverty over time

The African country of Ethiopia has made strides towards alleviating poverty since 2000 when it was assessed that their poverty rate was one of the greatest among all other countries. The country has made great strides in different areas of the Millennium Development Goals including eradicating various diseases and decreasing the rate of child mortality. Despite these improvements, poverty is still extremely high within the country. Based on the most recent data from 2019, 68.7% of the population is affected by multidimensional poverty and an additional 18.4% vulnerable to it. One of the leading factors in driving down poverty was the expansion of the agricultural sector. Poor farmers have been able to set higher food prices to increase their sales and revenue, but this expansion has come at a cost to the poorest citizens of the country, as they could not afford the higher priced food. One of the biggest challenges to alleviating this issue is changing the structure of Ethiopia's economy from an agricultural-based economy to a more industry-based economy. The current strategy for addressing poverty in Ethiopia is by building on existing government systems and development programs that are already in place within the country.

== External trade ==
Exports of Ethiopia by product category (2019) Chemical products Transportation Machines Mineral products Plastics and rubbers Metals Foodstuffs Precious metals Textiles Instruments Animal products Vegetable products Paper goods Footwear and headwear Miscellaneous Stone and glass Wood products Animal and vegetable bi-products Animal hides Arts and antiques Weapons

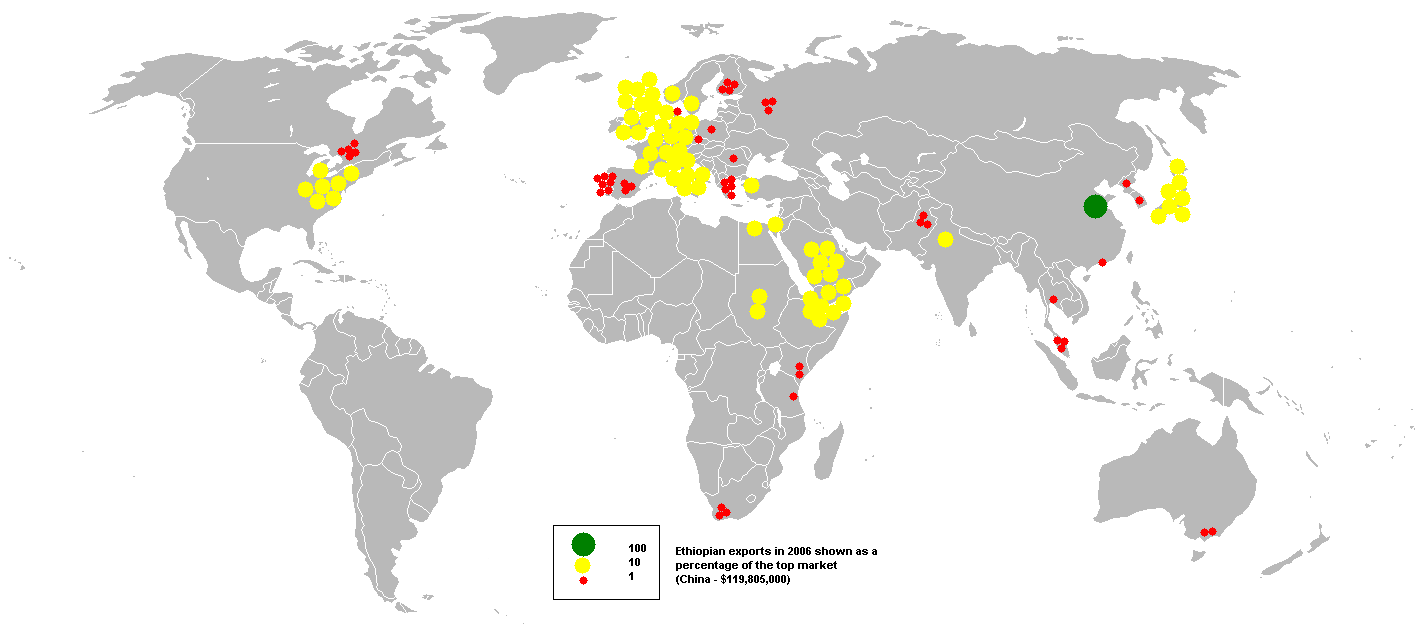
Ethiopian exports in 2006

Until 2013, the major agricultural export crop was coffee, providing about 26.4% of Ethiopia's foreign exchange earnings. In the beginning of 2014, oilseeds exports have been more important. Coffee is critical to the Ethiopian economy. More than 15 million people (25% of the population) derive their livelihood from the coffee sector. Other exports include live animals, leather and leather products, chemicals, gold, pulses, oilseeds, flowers, fruits and vegetables and khat (or qat), a leafy shrub which has psychotropic qualities when chewed. Cross-border trade by pastoralists is often informal and beyond state control and regulation. In East Africa, over 95% of cross-border trade is through unofficial channels and the unofficial trade of live cattle, camels, sheep and goats from Ethiopia sold to Somalia, Kenya and Djibouti generates an estimated total value of between US$250 and US$300 million annually (100 times more than the official figure). This trade helps lower food prices, increase food security, relieve border tensions and promote regional integration. However, there are also risks as the unregulated and undocumented nature of this trade runs risks, such as allowing disease to spread more easily throughout the region. Furthermore, the government of Ethiopia is purportedly unhappy with lost tax revenue and foreign exchange revenues. Recent initiatives have sought to document and regulate this trade.

Dependent on a few vulnerable crops for its foreign exchange earnings and reliant on imported oil, Ethiopia lacks sufficient foreign exchange. The financially conservative government has taken measures to solve this problem, including stringent import controls and sharply reduced subsidies on retail gasoline prices. Nevertheless, the largely subsistence economy is incapable of supporting high military expenditures, drought relief, an ambitious development plan, and indispensable imports such as oil; it therefore depends on foreign assistance.

In December 1999, Ethiopia signed a $1.4 billion joint venture deal with the Malaysian oil company, Petronas, to develop a huge natural gas field in the Somali Region. By the year 2010, however, implementation failed to progress and Petronas lost its license to develop the field, which is now being invested in by Chinese company, Poly-GCL Petroleum. Ethiopia has already begun exporting electricity to Kenya, South Sudan and Djibouti. Earning from this has generated US$300 million annually.

After the completion of the Grand Ethiopian Renaissance Dam (GERD) total generation of exports to neighboring countries is expected to bring in US$1 billion annually to the economy. The dam, which was completed in 2023, is the largest hydroelectric power plant in Africa as well as among the 20 largest in the world.

=== Trade statistics ===
Year	Goods exports (million US$)	Goods imports (in million US$)	Net trade (in million US$)
2023	▲$3,470	▲$15,318	▼−$11,849
2020	▲$3,253	▼$11,762	▼−$8,509
2015	▲$2,920	▲$14,977	▼−$12,057
2010	▲$2,480	▲$7,365	▼−$4,885
2005	▲$917	▲$3,701	▼−$2,784
2000	▲$486	▲$1,131	▼−$645
1990	▼$292	▲$912	▼−$620
1980	$419	$650	▼−$230

== See also ==
- Foreign aid to Ethiopia
- Famines in Ethiopia
- Growth and Transformation Plan
- List of companies of Ethiopia
- Special economic zone
- Trade unions in Ethiopia
- United Nations Economic Commission for Africa
