= Adola =

District in Oromia Region, Ethiopia

Coordinates: 6°00′N 39°05′E

Adola Adoolaa (Oromo)
- Woreda
- Location within Ethiopia
- Country: Ethiopia
- Region: (Oromia Region) Oromia
- Zone: Guji
- Time zone: UTC+3 (EAT)

Adola is one of the woredas in the Oromia Region of Ethiopia. It is part of former Adolana Wadera woreda what was divided for Adola, Girja and Wadera woredas and Adola town. Part of the Guji Zone, Adolana Wadera was bordered on the south by Liben, on the southwest by Odo Shakiso, on the west by Bore, on the north by the Southern Nations, Nationalities, and Peoples Region, and on the east by the Bale Zone.

== Overview ==
The altitude of this woreda ranges from 1500 to 2500 meters above sea level; Maleka Gudiba Wadera Tule is the highest point. Rivers include the Ganale Dorya and the Awata. A survey of the land in this woreda shows that 33% is arable (24% was under cultivation), 30% pasture, 20% forest, and the remaining 17% is considered swampy, degraded or otherwise unusable. State forests include Wadera, Zenbaba and Anferara. Khat, bananas and enset are important cash crops. Coffee is also an important cash crop; over 5,000 hectares are planted with it.

Industry in the woreda includes 19 grain mills, 3 metal works, 2 wood works, and 4 government-owned saw mills. While deposits of gold, nickel, kaolinite, chromium, and graphite have been identified in this woreda, only the gold deposits have been commercially exploited. The gold mine near Adola has historically been the most important gold mine in Ethiopia since its opening in 1941. There were 43 Farmers Associations with 29,438 members and 9 Farmers Service Cooperatives; about 75% of the farmers are pastoralists. Adolana Wadera has 45 kilometers of dry-weather and 110 of all-weather road, for an average road density of 50.9 kilometers per 1000 square kilometers. About 7.4% of the rural and 28.8% of the urban population has access to drinking water.

Adolana Wadera was one of four woredas that suffered from a wildfire that was started 10 February 2000 but was not brought under control until 7 April, after it had burned a total of 70,000 hectares.

== Demographics ==
The 2007 national census reported a total population for this woreda of 110,034, of whom 55,940 were men and 54,094 were women; none of its population were urban dwellers. The majority of the inhabitants said they were Protestant, with 59.91% of the population reporting they observed this belief, while 10.29% of the population were Muslim, 8.13% practiced traditional beliefs, 5.89% practised Ethiopian Orthodox Christianity, and 2.23% were Catholic.

Based on figures published by the Central Statistical Agency in 2005, this woreda has an estimated total population of 194,574, of whom 95,722 are men and 98,852 women; 43,052 or 22.13% of its population are urban dwellers, which is greater than the Zone average of 11.6%. With an estimated area of 3,064.22 square kilometers, Adolana Wadera has an estimated population density of 63.5 people per square kilometer, which is greater than the Zone average of 21.09.

The 1994 national census reported a total population for this woreda of 134,343, of whom 68,174 were men and 66,169 women; 24,048 or 17.9% of its population were urban dwellers at the time. The five largest ethnic groups reported in Adolana Wadera were the Oromo (86.14%), the Amhara (6.92%), the Gedeo (2.24%), the Silt'e (1.17%), and the Soddo Gurage (0.91%); all other ethnic groups made up 2.62% of the population. Oromiffa was spoken as a first language by 82.77%, 13.22% spoke Amharic and 2.01% spoke Gedeo; the remaining 2% spoke all other primary languages reported. The plurality of the inhabitants were Protestant, with 37.45% of the population having reported they practiced that belief, while 23.7% of the population said they were Muslim, 20.44% professed Ethiopian Orthodox Christianity, 9.63% practiced traditional beliefs, and 3.8% were Catholic.
