= Trade unions in Ethiopia =

- National organization(s): CETU
- Density: 9.6 (2013)

Global Rights Index
- 4 Systematic violations of rights

International Labour Organization
- Ethiopia is a member of the ILO

Convention ratification
- Freedom of Association: 4 June 1963
- Right to Organise: 4 June 1963

The trade unions of Ethiopia have a total membership of approximately 300,000. Over 203,000 are members of the Confederation of Ethiopian Trade Unions (CETU).

Ethiopia has also ratified ILO conventions 29 (in 2003), 87 (1963), 98 (1963), 100 (1999), 105 (1999), 111 (1966), 138 (1999), and 182 (2003).

== History ==
An organized labor movement came late to Ethiopia. This was due, in part, to the small size of its industrial working force (which was estimated to number 15,583 in 1957), but more importantly because the Ethiopian government viewed any type of organized protest as a form of insurrection.

Although the 1955 constitution guaranteed the right to form workers' associations, it was not until 1962 that the Ethiopian government issued the Labor Relations Decree, which authorized trade unions. In April 1963, the imperial authorities recognized the Confederation of Ethiopian Labor Unions (CELU), which represented twenty-two industrial labor groups. By 1973 CELU had 167 affiliates with approximately 80,000 members, which represented only about 30 percent of all eligible workers. The CELU drew its membership from not only the railway workers, but included workers at the Addis Ababa Fiber Mills, Indo-Ethiopian Textiles, Wonji Sugar Plantation, Ethiopian Airlines and General Ethiopian Transport (also known as the Anbassa Bus Company).

CELU never evolved into a national federation of unions. Instead, it remained an association of labor groups organized at the local level. The absence of a national constituency, coupled with other problems such as corruption, embezzlement, election fraud, ethnic and regional discrimination, and inadequate finances, prevented CELU from challenging the status quo in the industrial sector. Further, both management and government officials treated the unions with contempt. As Keller notes, "The government was slow to revise archaic labor laws such as those which dealt with child labor and the minimum wage. Union leaders were harassed, and when unions threatened to strike, they were 'locked out.'" CELU had organized general strikes in 1964, and 1970, but each time failed to attract necessary widespread support. After 1972 CELU became more militant as drought and famine caused the death of up to 200,000 people. The government responded by using force to crush labor protests, strikes, and demonstrations. This militancy peaked with the successful general strike of 7–11 March 1975, which not only led to salary and pension increases, but played an important role in the Ethiopian Revolution and helped to discredit the regime of Emperor Haile Selassie.

Although many of its members supported the overthrow of Emperor Haile Selassie, the CELU came to ally itself with the radical intelligentsia in pressuring the Derg to share power. The CELU also demanded shop-floor control over production. Despite numerous strikes in and around Addis Ababa, which sometimes ended in bloody confrontations, on May 19, 1975, the Derg temporarily closed CELU headquarters on the grounds that the union needed to be reorganized. The military authorities also demanded that workers should elect their future leaders according to the aims and objectives of Ethiopian socialism. This order ostensibly did not rescind traditional workers' rights, such as the right to organize freely, to strike, and to bargain collectively over wages and working conditions. Instead, the intent was to control the political activities of the CELU leadership. As expected, CELU rejected these actions and continued to demand democratic changes and civilian rights. After battling one another for most of the year, the Derg at last decreed a curfew and martial law on 30 September, and arrested 1,500 union members; although the CELU responded with a general strike, it failed to gather support in the main industrial sectors. As Rene Lafort concludes, "The CELU was dead. The Labour Code promulgated on 6 December 1975 was its obituary."

On 8 January 1977, the Derg replaced the CELU (abolished December 1975) with the All-Ethiopia Trade Union (AETU). The AETU had 1,341 local chapters, known as workers' associations, with a total membership of 287,000, or twice as large as CELU had been. The government maintained that the AETU's purpose was to educate workers about the need to contribute their share to national development by increasing productivity and building socialism.

In 1978 the Derg replaced the AETU executive committee after charging it with political sabotage, abuse of authority, and failure to abide by the rules of democratic centralism. In 1982 a further restructuring of the AETU occurred when Addis Ababa issued the Trade Unions' Organization Proclamation. An uncompromising Marxist–Leninist document, this proclamation emphasized the need "to enable workers to discharge their historical responsibility in building the national economy by handling with care the instruments of production as their produce, and by enhancing the production and proper distribution of goods and services." A series of meetings and elections culminated in a national congress in June 1982, at which the government replaced the leadership of the AETU. In 1986 the government renamed the AETU the Ethiopia Trade Union (ETU).

In 1983/84 the AETU claimed a membership of 313,434. The organization included nine industrial groups, the largest of which was manufacturing, which had accounted for 29.2 percent of the membership in 1982/83, followed by agriculture, forestry, and fishing with 26.6 percent, services with 15.1 percent, transportation with 8.1 percent, construction with 8.0 percent, trade with 6.2 percent, utilities with 3.7 percent, finance with 2.4 percent, and mining with 0.7 percent. A total of 35.6 percent of the members lived in Addis Ababa and another 18.0 percent in Shewa. Eritrea and Tigray accounted for no more than 7.5 percent of the total membership. By the late 1980s, the AETU had failed to regain the activist reputation its predecessors had won in the 1970s. According to one observer, this political quiescence probably indicated that the government had successfully co-opted the trade unions.

== Current status ==
In 2000 a private company dissolved its labor union after a disagreement between management and the workers. A total of 586 workers were expelled from the company, including union leaders. The Ethiopian government attempted to mediate the dispute, but the employer refused to cooperate; the case was expected to be referred to the Ministry of Labor and Social Affairs later that year.

During 2008, the top management of the state-owned Bole Printing Enterprise disagreed with its union over issues of worker compensation and unlawful termination. In late December a labor advisory board, composed of state ministers, representatives of the employees, the CETU, and Bole Printing Enterprise management, found that both sides were at fault and decided to reinstate the unlawful terminations of employees. The employees were expected to resume their duties.

== See also ==
- Economy of Ethiopia
