= Danakil =

Danakil may refer to:

- Danakil people or Afar people, an ethnic group in the Horn of Africa
- Danakil Depression, a desert basin in north-eastern Ethiopia and southern Eritrea
- Danakil Desert, a desert in the Horn of Africa
- Danakil Depression or Afar Triangle, a geological depression in the Horn of Africa
- Danakil Alps, a mountain range in the Horn of Africa
- Danakil Isthmus, a land bridge across the Bab-el-Mandeb strait during the Miocene epoch
- Danakil mine, a mine in the northern Afar Region of Ethiopia
- Danakil desert lark, a subspecies of Desert lark
- Danakilia, a genus of fish native to northeastern Africa
- Danakil (band), a French reggae band
- Danakil, the pseudonym of the French photographer and videographer Cyrille de Vignemont (on French Wikipédia)

== See also ==
- Dankali (disambiguation)
