= Danakil mine =

Mine in Afar Region, Ethiopia

Location
- Location: Afar Region, Ethiopia

Production
- Products: Potash

The Danakil mine is a mine located in the northern Afar Region of Ethiopia. It represents one of the largest potash reserves in the country, estimated at 3.03 billion tonnes of ore grading 18% potassium chloride metal.

== See also ==
- Dawa Okote mine
- Gewane-Mille mine
