= Timeline of the Ethiopian Revolution =

This is chronology of the Ethiopian Revolution that took place from 12 January to 12 September 1974 in the Ethiopian Empire.

== January ==
- 12 January - Rank-and-file soldiers of the Negele Borana garrison mutiny over bad food and lack of drinking water. They seize the Emperor's personal envoy sent to negotiate and pacify, Lt. Gen. Deresse Dubale, and force him to eat and drink as they did.

== February ==
- 10 February - Technicians and NCOs at the main Air Force base in Debre Zeyit (Bishoftu) mutiny, holding their officers hostage for three days in a mess tent.
- 14 February - Students at Haile Selassie University in the capital go on strike against a proposed reform in the educational system. High school teachers and college professors support the student strike.
- 18 February - School teachers strike for better pay. On the same day, taxi drivers in Addis Ababa strike over a proposed 50% increase in gas prices.
- 23 February - Emperor Haile Selassie concedes to some of the strikers' demands.
- 25 February - Junior Officers/NCOs and enlisted men of the Second Division, headquartered in Asmara, mutiny, capturing a radio station and broadcasting their demands to the public.
- 28 February - Prime minister Aklilu Habte-Wold resigns. His resignation was not demanded by any of the rebellious groups, and is seen as a sign of panic and weakness by the palace which is later exploited by civilians and soldiers. He is replaced by Endelkachew Makonnen.

== March ==
- 5 March - Emperor Haile Selassie announces that the 1955 Constitution would be revised to make the Prime Minister responsible to parliament.
- 7–9 March - The Confederation of Ethiopian Labor Unions calls a general labor strike.
- 31 March - General Abiye Abebe, the new chief of staff and Minister of Defense, announces a plot against the government by Air Force officers had been uncovered and foiled.

== April ==
- 20 April - Muslims stage a demonstration in Addis Ababa demanding religious equality and separation of church and state.
- 26 April - After weeks of agitation and intermittent strikes, the government shuts down Haile Selassie University.
- 27 April - The Coordinating Committee of the Armed Forces (under the command of Colonel Alem Zewde Tessema of the Airborne Corps) issues their first statement, announcing that 19 ministers and former officials of the imperial regime have been arrested.
- 30 April - Prime Minister Endelkachew Makonnen announces the creation of a joint military-civilian National Security Commission under General Abiye Abebe to deal with growing lawlessness and the numerous wildcat strikes crippling the country. (This National Security Commission replaces the first Coordinating Committee of the Armed Forces.

== June ==
- 25 June - The wives and relations of the arrested officials of the imperial regime (now 25 in number) petition that the prisoners be released pending an investigation. It is rejected by parliament, who see this as an attempt to restore the status quo.
- 28 June - In response to the unsuccessful petition, a new Coordinating Committee of the Armed Forces (which becomes the Derg) seizes the radio station in Addis Ababa, and begin to arrest other aristocrats, high officials, and generals suspected of being behind the reactionary movement, while at the same time still professing to be non-ideological and loyal to the monarchy as system of government.

== July ==
- 9 July - The Derg issues its first political statement, in an announcement in 13 points.
- 22 July - Prime Minister Endelkachew Makonnen resigns. He is replaced by Mikael Imru, a progressive aristocrat.

== August ==
- 1 August - Endelkachew Makonnen is arrested by the Derg.

== September ==
- 12 September - Emperor Haile Selassie is deposed and removed from the palace. The military committee declared Crown Prince Asfaw Wossen (who was abroad for medical treatment) "King" instead of "Emperor". The prince would refuse to acknowledge this.
- 15 September - The Coordinating Committee of the Armed Forces renames itself as the Provisional Military Administrative Council, and announces General Aman Mikael Andom as the new chairman, who de facto becomes the acting Ethiopian head of state.

== November ==
- 20 November (approximate date) - General Aman resigns in protest.
- 23 November - General Aman dies in a shootout with troops sent to arrest him. That same night 57 important political prisoners held by the Derg are executed.

== December ==
- 20 December - The Derg proclaims the establishment of "Ethiopian Socialism", based on the declaration of Etiopia Tikdem.
