= Dankali =

Dankali may refer to:

- Dankali, Cameroon, Adamawa Province, Cameroon
- Dankali Sultanate, a medieval Muslim kingdom in the Horn of Africa, ruled by the Afar people
- Afar people, or Dankali, an ethnic group in the Horn of Africa
- Denkalia, or Dänkali, a former province of Eritrea

== See also ==
- Danakil (disambiguation)
