= Manufacturing in Ethiopia =

Manufacturing in Ethiopia was, before 1957, dominated by cottage and handicraft industries which met most of the population's needs for manufactured goods such as clothes, ceramics, machine tools, and leather goods. Various factors – including the lack of basic infrastructure, the dearth of private and public investment, and the lack of any consistent public policy aimed at promoting industrial development – contributed to the insignificance of manufacturing.

== Five-year plans ==
In 1957, Ethiopia initiated a series of five-year development plans. Throughout much of the 1960s and early 1970s, manufacturing activity increased as the government's five-year plans diversified the economy by encouraging agro-industrial activity and by substituting domestically produced goods for imported items. Thus, according to the World Bank, manufacturing production increased at an annual rate of 6.1 percent between 1965 and 1973. During the same period, agriculture grew at an annual 2.1 percent rate, and services grew at an annual 6.7 percent rate. Despite this favorable growth rate, manufacturing in 1975 accounted for less than 5 percent of the gross domestic product (GDP) and employed only about 60,000 people. Handicrafts, such as weaving, pottery, blacksmithing, leather working, and jewelry making, along with other small-scale industries, accounted for another 5 percent of GDP. In 1984/85 manufacturing and handicrafts together accounted for 11.4 percent of GDP.

== Nationalization ==
In 1975 the Derg nationalized more than 100 industries and took partial control of some of them. The main characteristics of the manufacturing sector inherited by the revolution included: a predominance of foreign ownership and foreign managerial, professional, and technical staffing; great emphasis on light industries; inward orientation and relatively high tariffs; capital-intensiveness; underutilized capacity; minimal linkage among the different sectors; and excessive geographical concentration of industries in Addis Ababa, the capital city.

== Exodus of foreigners ==
Following nationalization, there was an exodus of foreigners who had owned and operated the industrial enterprises. The war in Eritrea and labor strikes and demonstrations also closed the approximately 30 percent of the country's manufacturers that had been located in that region.

== Economic dislocation ==
The economic dislocation that followed the revolution had a significant impact on the manufacturing sector. Private sector capital investment ceased, and labor's marginal productivity began to decline. In performance terms, the manufacturing sector's output after 1975 grew haltingly. Manufacturing had grown at an average annual rate of 6.1 percent between 1965 and 1973. A period of decline from 1974/75 to 1977/78 and an average annual growth rate of 18.9 percent for 1978/79 and 1979/80 were followed by a reduction of the growth rate to about 3.1 percent per annum between 1980/81 and 1984/85 and 3.8 percent per annum from 1985/86 to 1988/89.

== Socialist economy ==
Finally, in March 1990 president Mengistu Haile Mariam announced the replacement of Ethiopia's communist economic system with a socialist economic system. Among the proposed changes were that private investors would be permitted to participate in all parts of the economy with no limit on the amount of capital invested.

== See also ==
- Economy of Ethiopia
- Industrial development policy of Ethiopia
- Cotton production in Ethiopia
