= Industrial sector in Ethiopia =

Ethiopia's industrial sectors classified into four basic groups: agriculture, food processing, construction, resources and energy and tourism. Agriculture constitutes over 50% of economic sector in Ethiopia, and the largest dependable economic activity. It includes production of livestock products (milk, egg, meat), beverages, leather and textiles industry. Besides, Ethiopia is the largest exporter of coffee involving over 15 million active workers.

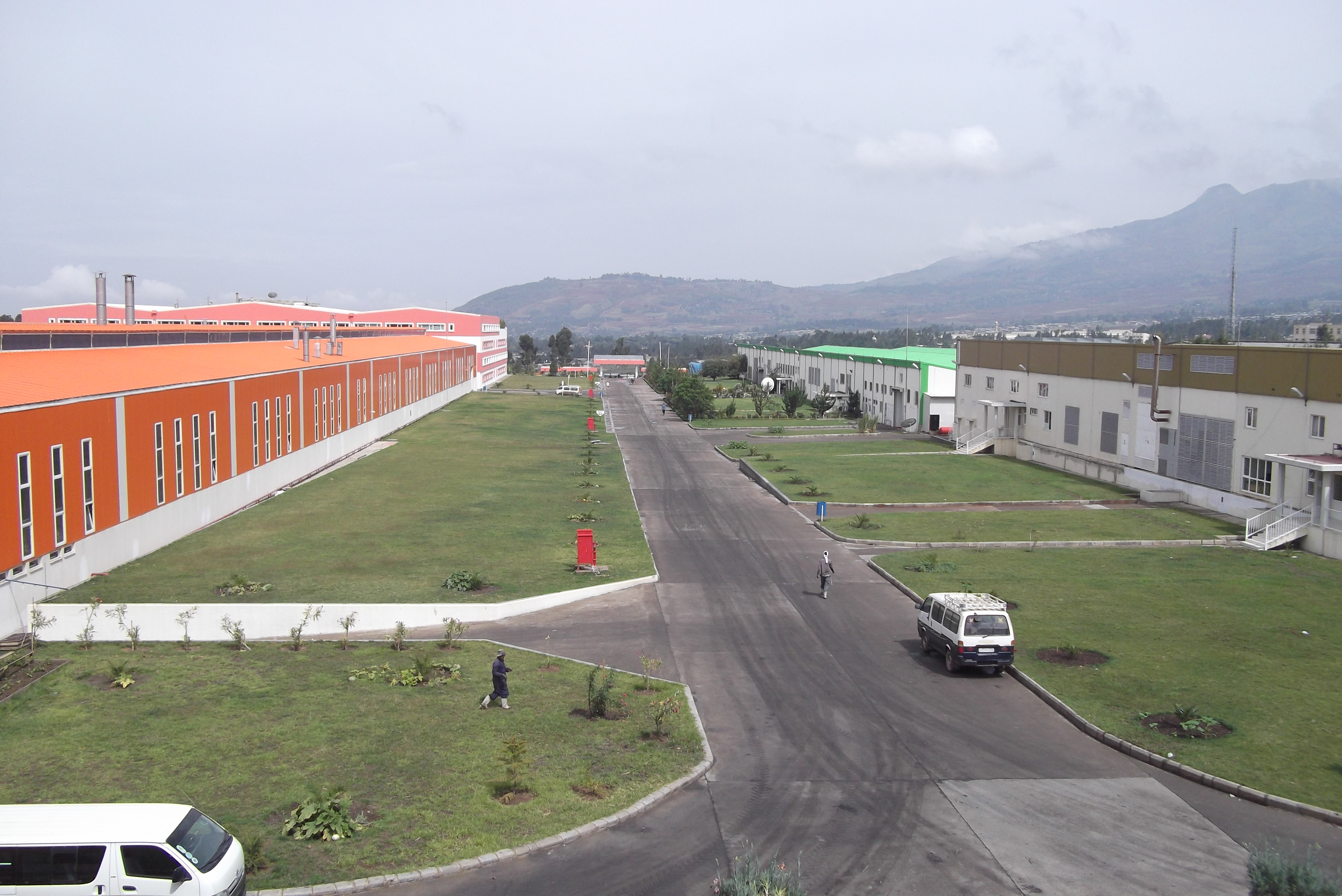
Factory buildings of Ayka Textile Industry in Alem Gena, Addis Ababa

Construction industry has been the second largest economic sector in Ethiopia with annual growth of 11.6%. Infrastructures and buildings of residential or non-residential are regularly constructed with government intervention in policy to encourage sustainable growth, and foreign direct investment from Chinese and European investors.

In energy and resources, Ethiopia has abundant natural resources that generate 60,000 MW of electric power from hydroelectric, wind, solar and geothermal sources from different major rivers, the Blue Nile, Awash, Shebelle, Omo, and Gilgel Gibe River. Tourism is the most popular economic sector impacting the GDP growth. Tourist attractions include Semien Mountains National Park, Rock-Hewn Churches in Lalibela, ruins and stelae in Axum, Harar Jugol, Negash Mosque, Gondar Fasil Ghebbi and among others.

== Agriculture ==
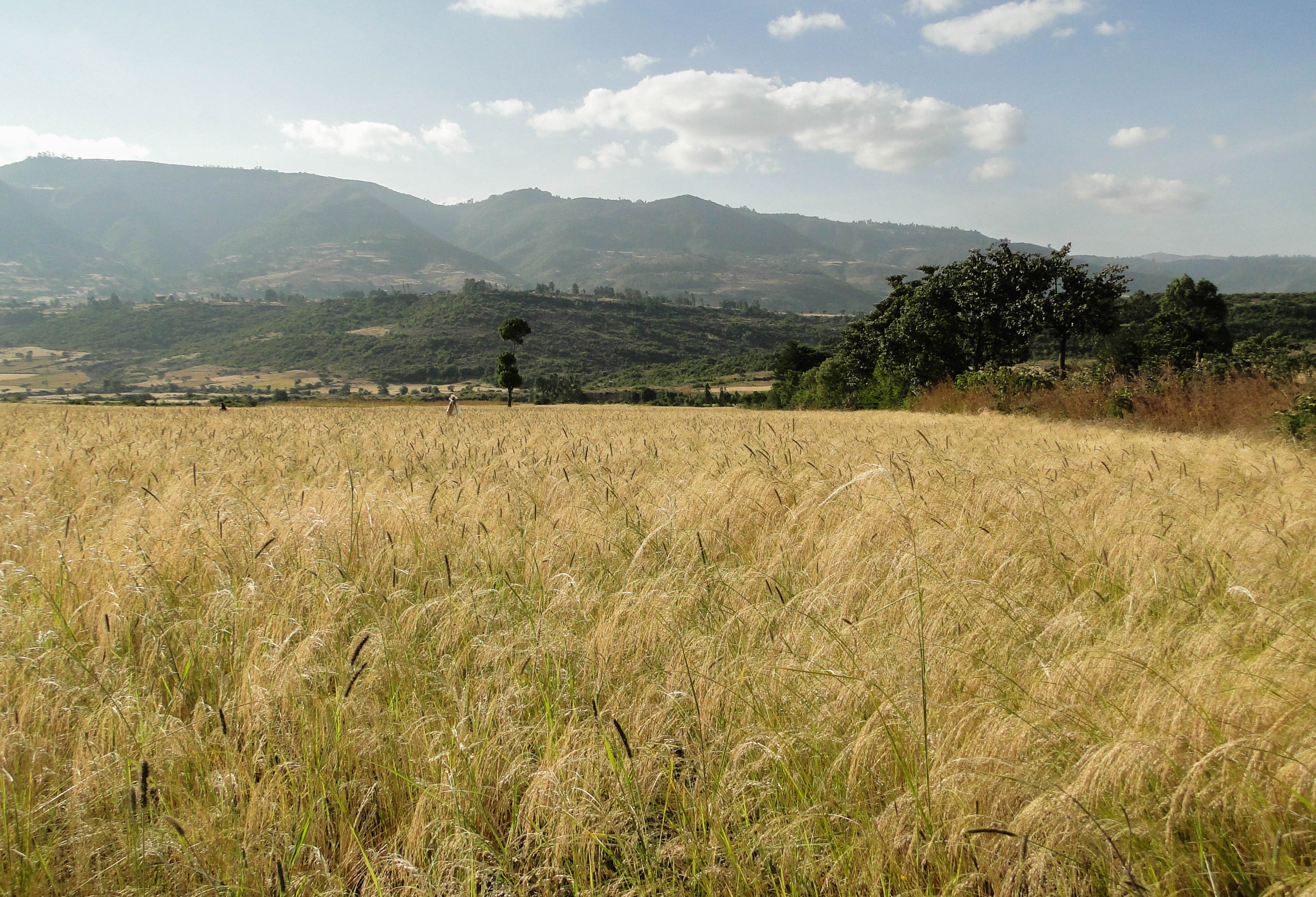
Teff field near Mojo, Oromia Region

Over 50%, agriculture comprises the largest industry sector in Ethiopia. The government undertakes both large-scale and small-scale farming, leading to high production of livestock products (milk, egg and meat) beverages, leather and textiles industry. Other goods are apparel, leather goods, and finished meat products for export and domestic purposes. About 60% Ethiopian labor population deployed to cash crop farming sector, which include spices, coffee, tea, cut flowers, honey, cotton, wheat, oilseeds, khat, beeswax, vegetables, fruits and pulses. The high-value oil seeds cultivated in Ethiopia for exports accounted $446 million while fruits and vegetables accounted $538 million in 2017.

Coffee has been the most exported product of Ethiopia. Over 15 million workers involved to cultivation and processing. In 2016/2017, annually export revenue estimated about $881 million. By 2019/2020, the government planned to increase export revenue by 2 million dollars. Subsistence livestock farming is an integral agricultural activity in Ethiopia which is practiced in the lowland region. They produced mutton and beef and goat meat, which contributed $97 million worth whereas raw hides exports revenue amounted about $74 million in 2017. In general, the agricultural activity in Ethiopia cultivated for other nascent industrial sectors such as for machinery manufacturing and even for wholesale and retail businesses.

Ethiopian farmers often frustrated to secure foot at large, primarily due to ecological factors. Population growth, climate change, declination of available natural resources, unemployment, political unrest and inflation are fundamental problems to challenge sustainable growth. In one instance, inflation could heavily impact the growth, requiring food demand. From 2005 to 2012, maize grain in Addis Ababa drastically increased from 1,469 to 5,013 ETB per ton, and the price was tripled in the last five years. Overall, the food price inflation was increased from 7.4% to 15.8% between 2014 and 2019 years.

== Food processing ==
Food processing industry is the second largest sector in Ethiopia after agriculture. In 2009/2010, it accounted for 39% of gross value of production in medium and large sized manufacturing, employing 1 million people that comprises about 2% of overall economic activity. The food sector produces large amount of revenue to the government of Ethiopia, which requires one million workers. Products typically are meat, butter, sugar, bakery, grain milling, pasteurized milk, frozen food, fresh fruits, bakery products, sugar, and cheese—together cover 47% of total gross value product (GVP).

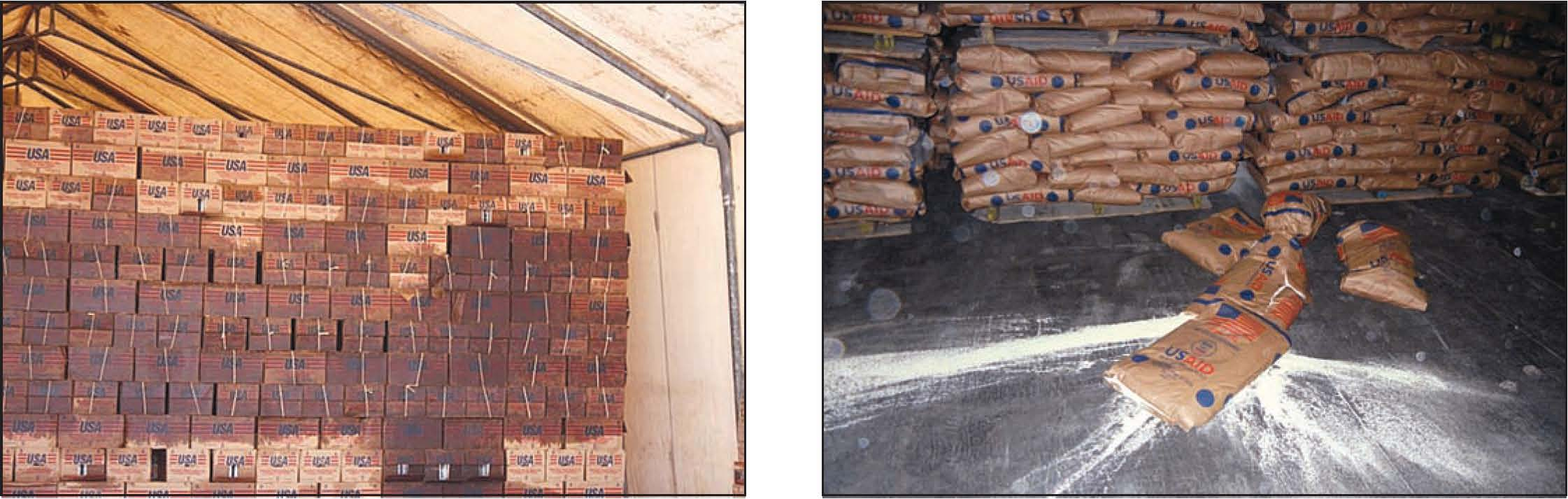
Improperly stored vegetable oil within cardboard boxes in a warehouse in Dire Dawa

Meanwhile, the sectorial analysis shows quality and standard problem in supply. In other secondary manufacturers, raw materials badly deformed. Thus, upgrading the quality and stability would alleviate the problem and contributed for sustainable growth.

Injera marketing is evolving rapidly, employing more than 100,000 people in urban areas. Rice routinely importing for almost US$200 million in 2015, so that rice is important for Injera makeup.

== Construction ==
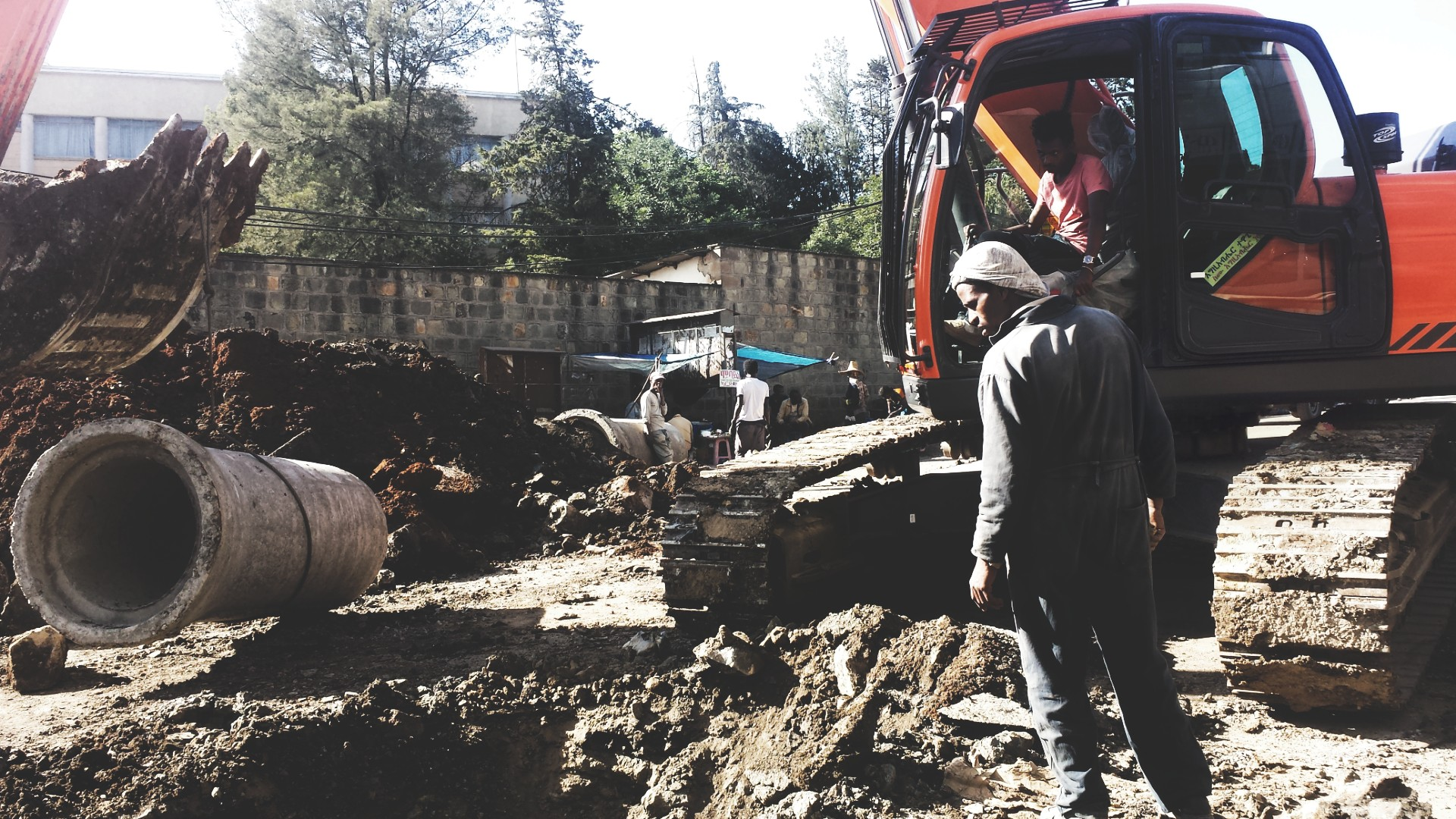
Construction site worker in 2017

Rapid infrastructure development increasing across regions contributed annual growth of construction sector by 11.6%. Building residential or non-residential areas transformed people to more employment, easing trade and industry beneficiaries. Energy and infrastructure sectors cover the larger construction activities in Ethiopia, responsible for providing cost-effective homes for benefit of low-income households, and increased the country's GDP to 9.5%. This segment employs 1.8 million workers, which makes the second largest sector in Ethiopia.

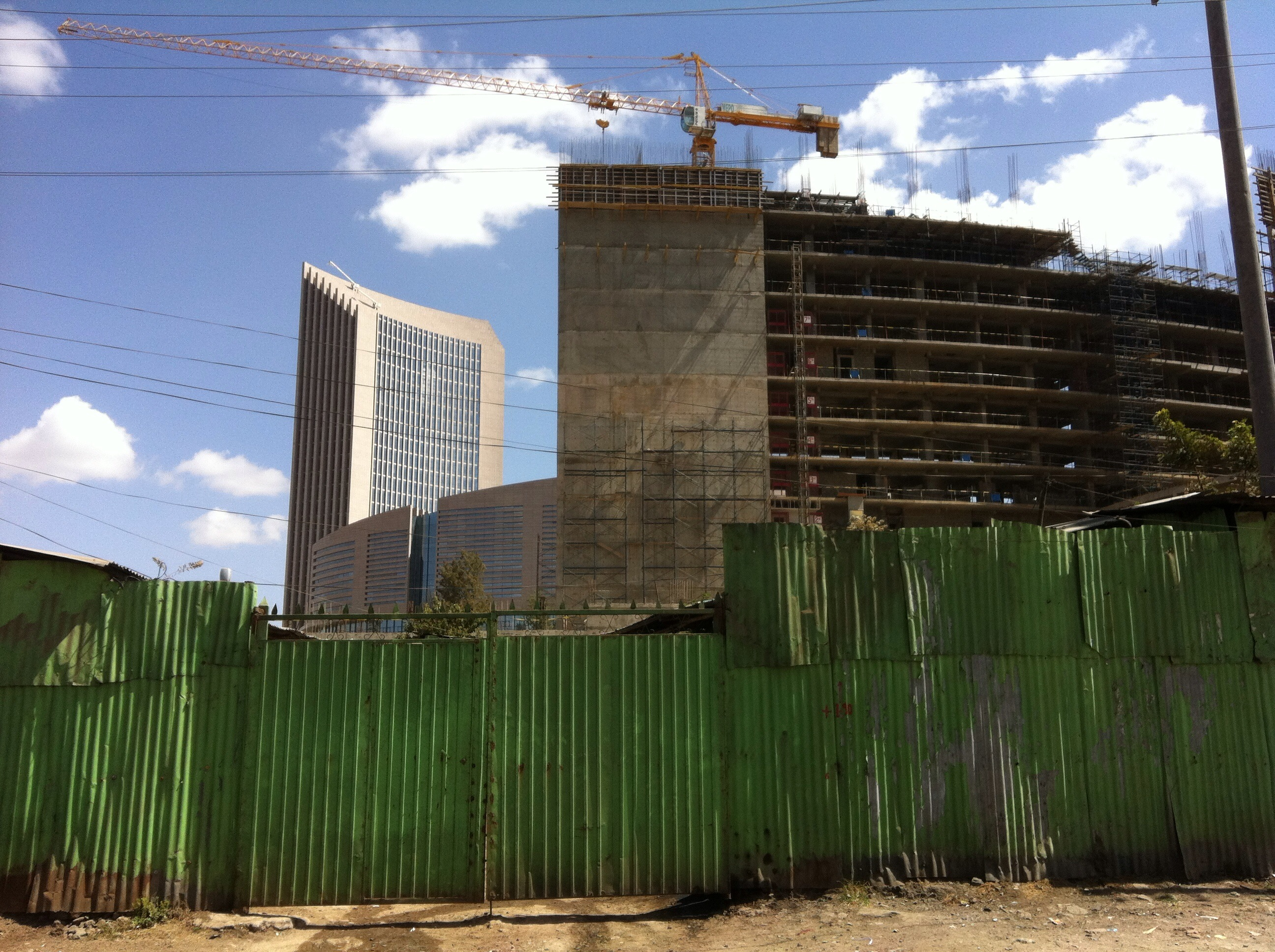
Unfinished building in 2012

The government also intervenes to address various restraints on management of industry and facilities implementation of laws. Foreign countries such as China and other European investors helped a significant role in the development of both industrial and infrastructural unit, plus the Ethiopian industries linked its partnership with suppliers, consultants, contractors and engineers etc.

== Resources and energy ==
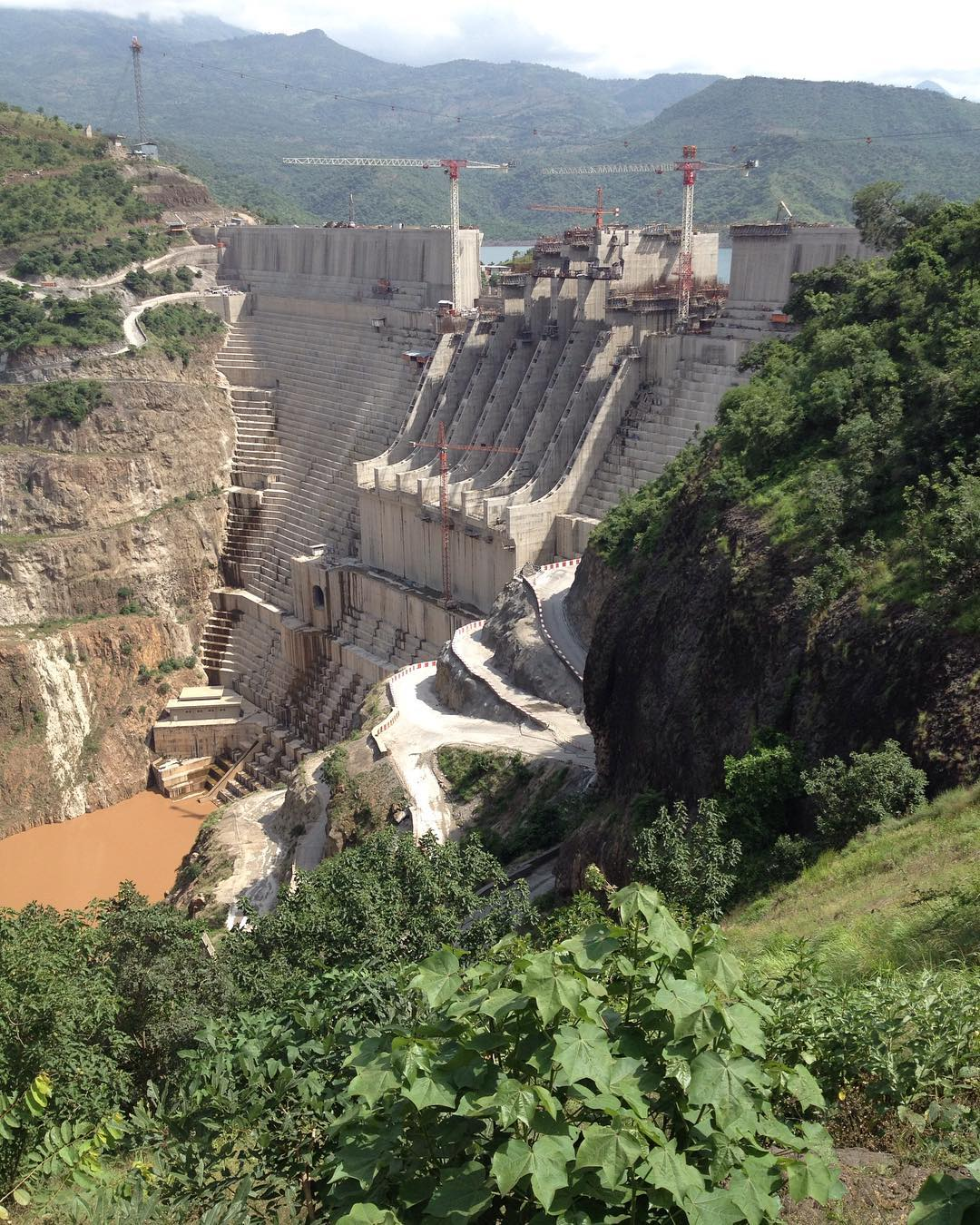
Gilgel Gibe III Dam in Omo River

Mineral resources like tantalum has contributed to 10% increase of GDP. Sites like Kibre Mengist and Yubdo, which are located both south and west Ethiopia respectively, are ideals for mining place, and tantalum has been mined in Keticha located in Oromia Region. Annual production of tantalum accounts 120 tons, which makes Ethiopia the largest world's producer of tantalum as of 2013. Other minerals include niobium, gemstone, soda ash, and rock salt which is found in Denakil plain. Ethiopia has also natural gases and petroleum, which are scarcely located in some parts.

The energy sector played preliminary role in million people's lives, contributing to social, economic and ecological impacts. Major hydroelectricity generated from the dams stationed in Blue Nile and tributaries, Awash, Shebelle, Omo and Gilgel Gibe rivers. The government is constructing new hydroelectric dam and expanding power stations to various parts of the country. This will lead to rural electrification.

Ethiopia has abundant renewable energy resources and potentially generate 60,000 megawatt of electric power from hydroelectric, wind, solar and geothermal sources. This makes boosted its GDP growth rapidly, and electricity demand always increasing as well. Despite its growth, the Ethiopian energy sector do not complying with public demand as a result of energy shortages and load shedding to feed 110 million people and the demand predicted to grow by 30%.

Resource	Unit	Exploitable Reserve	Exploited percent
Hydropower	MW	45,000	<5%
Solar/day	kWh/m^{2}	4 – 6	<1%
Wind: Power Speed	GW m/s	100 >7	<1%
Geothermal	MW	<10,000	<1%
Wood	Million tons	1120	50%
Agricultural waste	Million tons	15-20	30%
Natural Gas	Billion m^{3}	113	0%
Coal	Million tons	300	0%
Oil shale	Million tons	253	0%

== Tourism ==
Tourism plays an important role to Ethiopian industry, with employment of thousands of local people. In 2015, the European Council named Ethiopia "World's Best Tourism Destination". In 2006, it contributed to 5.5% of GDP with private companies played significant role. Major tourist attractions include the Semien Mountains National Park, Rock-Hewn Churches in Lalibela, ruins and stelae in the place of Axum, Tiya stelae, Negash Mosque and in the cities like Harar Jugol and Gondar Fasil Ghebbi.

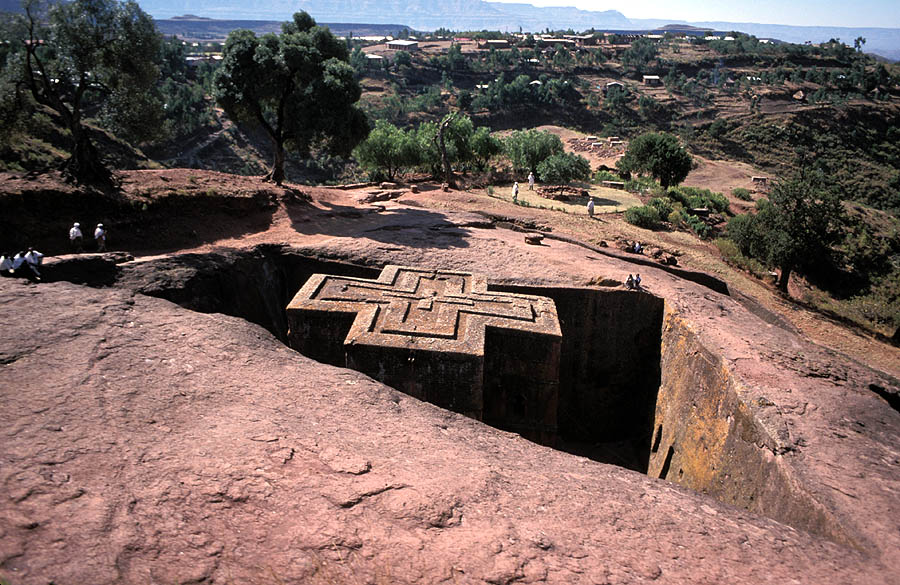
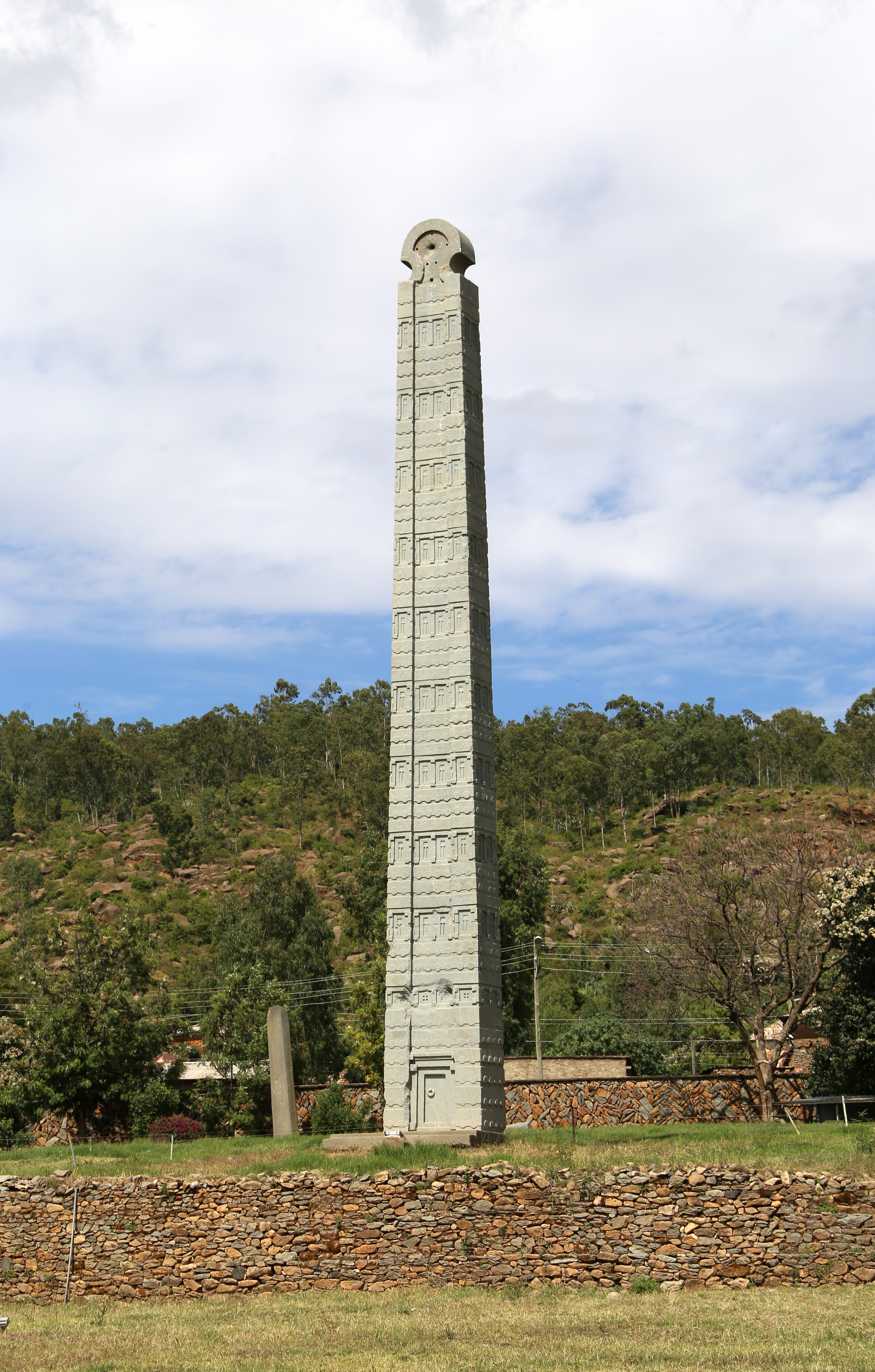
Church of Saint George (Beta Giyorgis) (top) and Obelisk of Axum (bottom)

The diverse culture of Ethiopia generally itself garnered tourism attraction. This would lead to government initiative to bring economic development and reducing poverty. In 2020, Ethiopia totally registered 518,000 tourists, being 126th rank in the world. It generated 2.28 million dollars in the tourism sector alone, corresponds to 2.1% GDP and approximately 5.4% of all international tourism receipts in East Africa.
