= Girja =

One of the woredas in the Oromia Region of Ethiopia

Girja is one of the woredas in the Oromia Region of Ethiopia. It was part of former Adolana Wadera woreda.

== Demographics ==
The 2007 national census reported a total population for this woreda of 50,179, of whom 25,198 were men and 24,981 were women; 977 or 1.95% of its population were urban dwellers. The plurality of the inhabitants said they were Protestant, with 34.98% of the population reporting they observed this belief, while 32.05% of the population were Muslim, and 12.24% practiced traditional beliefs.
