= Confederation of Ethiopian Labor Unions =

1963–1977 umbrella organization in Ethiopia

The Confederation of Ethiopian Labor Unions (CELU) was an umbrella organization that represented a number of labor unions and employee self-help associations in Ethiopia. The Derg, the military junta which ruled Ethiopia at the time, banned the organization and replaced it with the All-Ethiopian Trade Union 8 January 1977.

== History ==
Although the 1955 constitution guaranteed the right to form workers' associations, it was not until 1962 that the Ethiopian government issued the Labor the Relations Decree, which authorized trade unions. The next year, the imperial authorities recognized the CELU, which at the beginning represented twenty-two industrial labor groups. By 1973 the Confederation had 167 affiliates with approximately 80,000 members, which represented only about 30 percent of all eligible workers. The CELU drew its membership from not only the railway workers, but included workers at the Addis Ababa Fiber Mills, Indo-Ethiopian Textiles, Wonji Sugar Plantation, Ethiopian Airlines and General Ethiopian Transport (also known as the Anbassa Bus Company). The Ottaways note that the formation of a national labor organization, when only 27,000 people were employed in the manufacturing sector "was one of the paradoxes of Ethiopian politics at the time." They assert that the formation of CELU "can best be explained in terms of the country's foreign relations. A long time adherent to the International Labour Organization's charter, Emperor Haile Selassie apparently found it increasingly difficult not to respect it in practice, particularly at a time when he was trying to establish himself as a central figure in independent Africa."

However, during the 1960s the CELU failed to exert a serious challenge to the economic status quo for a number of reasons. One was that most of the membership were "white collar workers in such organizations as banks, insurance companies and airlines" who had little in common with their industrial counterparts. As a result, the CELU "did not seriously attempt before the revolution to establish a minimum wage." Other were flaws in the organization, which Edward Keller lists as including "corruption, embezzlement, election fraud, ethnic and regional discrimination, and insufficient finances. Seleshi Sisaye indicates that less than 40 percent of CELU's regular members paid dues. Annual revenues from dues averaged less than US$3,000. This forced CELU to rely on contributions from such international labor organizations as the International Confederation of Free Trade Unions, the All-African Labor Congress, and the International Labour Organization to finance its operations." Further, when the CELU had attempted to flex its power in two general strikes in 1964 and 1970, both times it had failed to secure the necessary widespread support. Despite these problems, the Ottaways note that when the Ethiopian Revolution erupted, "as the largest organization representing any of the new social groups and classes, it was a potential force to be reckoned with." Rene Lefort observes that the Conferation "wanted to take advantage of the opportunity to increase the power of their organization. They launched a vast recruitment campaign (in two weeks the number of trade-union members rose by 40% to reach 120,000, according to CELU)".

The CELU's role in the revolution came in March 1974. The Confederation presented to Prime Minister Endelkachew Makonnen a list of 16 demands, and warned that if the government did not satisfy these demands, they would call a general strike on 7 March; most of these demands specifically concerned labor issues, and only five addressed broader economic or political topics. The Endelkachew government delayed in responding to this list until the day before the general strike would occur, and then simply stated that each point would be answered in three to six months' time. "To its surprise, the general strike began the very next day," write the Ottaways. "With 85,000 to 100,000 workers participating, the country's main cities, particularly Addis Ababa, were paralyzed. But the CELU had no funds to sustain an unlimited strike, though they had promised one, and workers had no savings to fall back upon. By the third day, many were back on their jobs. The strike lasted long enough to force the Endelkachew government to sign an agreement, but not long enough to extract significant concessions." Despite the lack of a decisive victory, this general strike inspired a series of wildcat strikes over the following weeks by the public employees of the different government bodies. CELU also increased its membership in the months following the general strike by a third, although the Ottaways argue that this "shows how great was its past failure to fully organize the working class.

Up to this time, the CELU was dominated by leaders like CELU President Beyene Solomon, who had been trained by American labor unions, saw the organization in purely economic terms and denied any intent to make it into a political force. But as the revolution progressed, these leaders were pushed aside by more radical members in the annual meeting in September 1974. Two factions vied for control, according to Rene Lefort: a much smaller one, led by Alem Abdi, which came to align itself with the Derg; and the majority faction, led by Marqos Hagos. Four days after the deposition of Emperor Haile Selassie, on 16 September the CELU issued a communique condemning the Derg and demanding a civilian government, which led to the top three leaders of the CELU being arrested 24 September. Lacking the direction of a relatively moderate leadership, by May 1975 the CELU was under the control of one faction which viciously opposed the Derg along Marxist lines. The Derg ordered the CELU headquarters closed and the organization reorganized on 19 May, but eventually backed down and allowed the headquarters to be reopened in the face of worker unrest.

By the time of the general congress in Addis Ababa that September, the political makeover of the CELU was complete. "The socialist, even Maoist, language of its resolutions was unmistakable," note the Ottaways. "American-trained leaders had been replaced by more radical ones who embraced a far different ideology and concept of unionism. but, as would become apparent later, the new leadership was far ahead of, and cut off from, the bulk of the confederation's own rank and file." According to Marxist theory, for the Ethiopian Revolution to be successful a vanguard party needed to be formed; the CELU, along with a number of civilian groups, opposed the Derg having control over the creation of this vanguard party. On 25 September, an Ethiopian Airlines employee was caught distributing CELU literature amongst airport workers, leading to a battle between workers and police which left four people dead and 22 wounded. The CELU leadership called for a general strike and went underground; the Derg placed the capital city under martial law on 30 September, and over the following month more than 1,500 civilians were arrested. The failure of the CELU to mount an effective protest destroyed its national organization, although individual unions survived, and a number of its leaders, including Marqos Hagos, joined the growing Ethiopian People's Revolutionary Party, which was becoming the primary opposition to the Derg—and which became the principal target of the Red Terror.

== See also ==
- Trade unions in Ethiopia
