= Kenticha mine =

Tantalum mine in Oromia, Ethiopia

- Location within Ethiopia
- Location: Oromia Region, Ethiopia; 5°31′0.01″N 39°1′59.99″E
- Products: Tantalum

The Kenticha mine is a tantalum and lithium mine located in the Oromia Region of Southern Ethiopia. It is one of the largest tantalum reserves in the country, having estimated reserves of 116 million tonnes of ore grading 0.02% tantalum.

Mining at Kenticha has resulted in environmental conflict, as local unemployed youth have fought to gain control of the resource, while the Ministry of Public Enterprises has solicited bids to develop the mine from international mining corporations. Community members have also reported pollution from the mine.

== Production ==
The mine is located in Oromia state, 600 km south of Addis Ababa. It is mined by Ethiopian Minerals, Petroleum and Bio Fuel Corporation, and the products mainly exported to China.

Kenticha was mined for tantalum from 1990 to 2017. Peak production from the mine was 90-95 tons of tantalum concentrate per year, valued at $20 million per year.

Another sources states that before 2012, the mine produced 275 tons of tantalum/year, which was nearly 14% of global supply. Operations were stopped for a period in 2012 due to declining prices and due to radioactive by-products.

Later mining has been for lithium.

== Conflict ==
Mine operation was stopped in December 2017 when local residents reported that the tailing dam was filled above its designed capacity and that mine waste was causing pollution. After the mine shut down, illegal mining continued by "unknown individuals", and two tons of tantalum concentrate was reported stolen from the facility.

A 2020 study found that Uranium and Thorium occurred along with tantalum ores, exposing workers to radiation above international safety standards.

== See also ==
- Dawa Okote mine
- Gewane-Mille mine
