= Wadera, Ethiopia =

Wadera is a town in south-eastern Ethiopia. Located in the East Guji Zone of the Oromia Region, this town has a latitude and longitude of 05°45′N 39°19′E with an altitude of 1787 meters above sea level. It is named after the nearby Wadera Forest. Wadera is the administrative center of Wadera woreda.

Wadera is located on the main all-weather road which runs through Wadera and ends at Negele. This town has both telephone and postal service, and is supplied with electricity by the Ethiopian Electric Power Corporation from the national grid.

== Demographics ==
Based on figures from the Central Statistical Agency in 2005, this town has an estimated total population of 6,999 of whom 3,537 are men and 3,462 are women. The 1994 national census reported this town had a total population of 3,912 of whom 1,994 were men and 1,918 were women.
