= Adola Town =

Adola Adoolaa (Oromo)
- Town
- Location within Ethiopia Adola (Africa)
- Coordinates: 5°53′N 38°59′E
- Country: Ethiopia
- Region: Oromia
- Zone: Guji
- Elevation: 1,758 m (5,768 ft)

Population (2007)
  - Total: 22,938
- Time zone: UTC+3 (EAT)

Adola (Oromo: Adoolaa) is a town located in the Guji Zone of the Oromia Region, at an altitude of 1,758 metres (5,768 ft) above sea level. 470 km from Addis Ababa.

== Overview ==
Adola is served by a network of roads. A new road to Shakiso was built around 1960. Two years later an all-weather road reached the town from the north and a dry-weather road south to Negele Borana. This town has both telephone and postal service, and is supplied with electricity by the Ethiopian Electric Power Corporation from the national grid.

The gold mine near Adola has been the most historically important gold mine in Ethiopia since its opening in 1941; in 1944, for example, its revenue came to nearly a fifth of the total government budget. However, in the public vocabulary, according to the Ethiopian historian Bahru Zewde, the name of the town signified "terror both in the forcible recruitment of labour and in the conditions of penal servitude that prevailed in the labour camp."

Adola was founded during the Italian occupation; a British soldier who travelled through the area wrote in his memoirs that he remembered a "long, wooded valley with a few recently-built villas, the beginning of a new Italian settlement named Adola", as well as rumors that the Italians had found gold in the area.

== Demographics ==
The 2007 national census reported a total population for this town of 22,938, of whom 11,706 were men and 11,232 were women. The majority of the inhabitants said they practiced Ethiopian Orthodox Christianity, with 69.35% of the population reporting they observed this belief, while 17.5% of the population were Protestant, 11.05% were Muslim. The 1994 national census reported this town had a total population of 20,136 of whom 10,159 were males and 9,977 were females. It is the larger of two towns in Adola and Wadera woreda.

== Climate ==
Climate data for Adola (1971–2000)
Month	Jan	Feb	Mar	Apr	May	Jun	Jul	Aug	Sep	Oct	Nov	Dec	Year
Mean daily maximum °C (°F)	28.4 (83.1)	29.4 (84.9)	29.0 (84.2)	27.3 (81.1)	26.1 (79.0)	24.9 (76.8)	23.3 (73.9)	23.6 (74.5)	25.7 (78.3)	25.8 (78.4)	26.2 (79.2)	26.0 (78.8)	26.3 (79.4)
Mean daily minimum °C (°F)	9.8 (49.6)	8.9 (48.0)	10.7 (51.3)	13.2 (55.8)	14.1 (57.4)	13.6 (56.5)	13.4 (56.1)	13.4 (56.1)	13.6 (56.5)	12.9 (55.2)	10.4 (50.7)	10.1 (50.2)	12.0 (53.6)
Average precipitation mm (inches)	20.0 (0.79)	30.0 (1.18)	87.0 (3.43)	224.0 (8.82)	116.0 (4.57)	43.0 (1.69)	35.0 (1.38)	50.0 (1.97)	72.0 (2.83)	160.0 (6.30)	87.0 (3.43)	34.0 (1.34)	958 (37.73)
Source: FAO
