= Wadera (woreda) =

Wadera: Oromia Woreda (Ethiopia)

Wadera is one of the woredas in the Oromia Region of Ethiopia. It was part of former Adolana Wadera woreda. It is part of the Guji Zone. The largest town is Wadera.

== Demographics ==
The 2007 national census reported a total population for this woreda of 50,554, of whom 25,670 were men and 24,884 were women; 4,729 or 9.35% of its population were urban dwellers. The majority of the inhabitants said they were Muslim, with 64.18% of the population reporting they observed this belief, while 26.62% of the population were Protestant, 4.78% practised Ethiopian Orthodox Christianity, 2.62% practiced traditional beliefs, and 1.11% were Catholic.
