= List of government-owned companies of Ethiopia =

This is a list of government-owned companies of Ethiopia. A Government-owned corporation is a legal entity that undertakes commercial activities on behalf of an owner government. There is no standard definition of a government-owned corporation (GOC) or state-owned enterprise (SOE), although the two terms can be used interchangeably. The defining characteristics are that they have a distinct legal shape and they are established to operate in commercial affairs. While they may also have public policy objectives, GOCs should be differentiated from other forms of government agencies or state entities established to pursue purely non-financial objectives.

== Government-owned companies of Ethiopia ==
- Ethiopian Construction Design and Supervision Works Corporation
- Ethiopian Agricultural Businesses Corporation
- Ethio-Telecom
- Gumaro Tea Development Enterprise
- Industrial Parks Development Corporation
- Ethiopian Grain trade Enterprise
- Ethiopian Railway Corporation
- Sugar Corporation
- Metal and Engineering Corporation
- Commercial Bank of Ethiopia
- Development Bank of Ethiopia
- Ethiopian Electric Utility
- Ethiopian Electric Power
- Ethiopian Airlines Group
- Water Works
- Design and Supervision Enterprise
- Ethiopian water works construction
- Ethiopian shipping and logistic service
- Ethiopian Insurance corporation
- Chemical Industries Corporation
- Birhanena Selam printing enterprise
- Hotels Development S.C(A.A. Hilton)
- Adola Mine Enterprise
- Ethiopian Tourist Trading enterprise
- Spa Service Enterprise
- Ghion Hotels Enterprises
- National Alcohol and Liquor Factory
- Ethiopian Pulp and Paper S.C.
- Ethiopian Postal Service Enterprise
- Ethiopian Trading Business Enterprise
- Ethiopian Mineral, petroleum and Bio-fuel corporation
- Shebele Transport Share company
- Ethiopian public service employees transport enterprise
- Land bank and development corporation
- Ethiopians Toll roads enterprises
- Caustic Soda S.C.
- Awash Melkasa Aluminum Sulfate and Sulfuric Acid S.C
- Adamitulu Pesticide processing S.C
- Awassa Agricultural Development Enterprise
- Assala Malt Factory
- Building materials supply enterprise
- Industrial inputs development enterprise
- Defense construction materials manufacturing enterprise
- Defense construction enterprises
- Ethiopian Agricultural Commodities Warehousing
- Service Enterprise
- Ethiopian Construction Works Corporation
- Federal Housing Corporation
- Dry Port Service Enterprise
- The ethio-Djibouti standard Gauge railway transport S.C
- The Educational Materials Production and Distribution Enterprise
- Ethiopian Conformity assessment Enterprise

== See also ==
- List of government-owned companies
- Lists of companies (category)
- State ownership
