= Mining in Ethiopia =

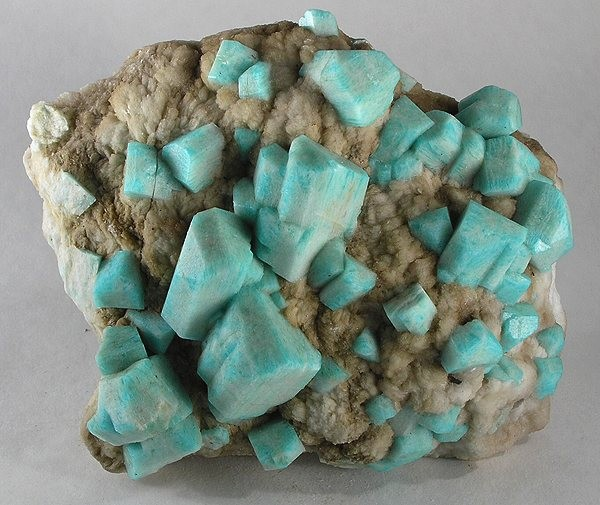
Microcline from the Kenticha mine, Oromia Region, Ethiopia.

Mining is important to the economy of Ethiopia as a diversification from agriculture. Currently, mining comprises only 1% of GDP. Gold, gemstones (diamonds and sapphires), and industrial minerals are important commodities for the country's export-oriented growth strategy.

The country has deposits of coal, opal, gemstones, kaolin, iron ore, soda ash, and tantalum, but only gold is mined in significant quantities. In Salt extraction from salt beds in the Afar Depression, as well as from salt springs in Dire and Afder districts in the south, is only of internal importance and only a negligible amount is exported.

Tantalum mining has also been profitable. It was reported that in the late 1980s, the mineral industry lacked importance given that it contributed less than 0.2 percent of Ethiopia's GDP. Mining for gold is a key development sector in the country. Gold export, which was just US$5 million in 2001, has recorded a large increase to US$602 million in 2012. 2001 gold production amounted to some 3.4 tons.

== Resources ==
The Ethiopian Geological Survey of the Ministry of Mines and Energy (MME) with assistance from UNDP and private companies have assessed the mineral and petroleum resources of Ethiopia. The resources discovered in different regions of the country are mainly gold, tantalum, phosphorus, iron, salt, potash, soda ash, gemstones, coal, geothermal and natural gas, apart from many industrial and construction materials. Other mineral resources are platinum, niobium, copper, nickel, manganese and molybdenum; marble is found extensively in most parts of the country.

Gold has been exploited since ancient times. Large ore based gold mines are the Lega Dembi (the largest mine in Guji Zone, Oromia region of Ethiopia) and Sakaro, which have been mined by private companies; the amount of gold produced by these mines is reported to be about 5 tons per year. In the Western and Northern Greenstone Belts of the country (finest mining reserve in gold mining), orogenic mines have been located; also discovered in this area are ores of the volcanogenic massive sulfide (VMS).

Tantalum is mined at Kenticha mine. It is found in the pegmatitic rocks of the Southern Greenstone Belt. Tantalum is used in making all electronic devices such as mobile phones, cameras, computers and so forth; and its mining programme is the sixth largest in the world. Kenticha mines has resources to the extent of 9,000 tonnes of processed potash which could be extracted over the next 15 years. This mine also produces quartz, feldspar, kaolin and dolomite used in industries. The gas fields are located in the southeastern part of the country at Calub, Hilala and Genale gas fields in the Ogaden Basin. The gas resources potential of these fields have been assessed as 4.6 Trillion Cubic Feet (TCF). Precambrian to Recent period rock formations are found suitable for use in construction and in industrial use.

== Laws ==
The legal and fiscal environment instituted by the government permits a free market-driven economy allowing both foreign and local companies to participate in the mining development of the country, in a transparent manner that would help boost the economy of the country. Licenses have been granted to investigate and assess the mining potential but also for its exploitation. The licensing policy brought out in June 1993 is titled "Mining and Mining Income Tax Proclamation". Some of the licenses issued cover mining of gold and base metals and also manufacture of cement, potash, diatomite and also covering industrial and construction materials. Licenses have been issued to 250 foreign firms from countries such as China, South Africa, the UK, the US and Canada. The license stipulates that every mining company should allocate 5% free equity shares apart from 8% royalties and 35% income tax. The initial validity of the lease is for 25 years extendable for further ten-year period.

Though the country is rich in mining resources its exploration and extraction has contributed only about 1% of its GDP with an investment of 14 billion birr. To give a boost to the five-year Growth and Transformation Plan (GTP) for the mining sector launched by the government, incentives are proposed to be offered in terms of tax reduction from the present level of 35% to 25%. During 2013, a draft document has been placed before the House of Peoples' Representatives for approval so that the sector becomes more competitive vis-à-vis those offered by neighboring countries.

== Production ==
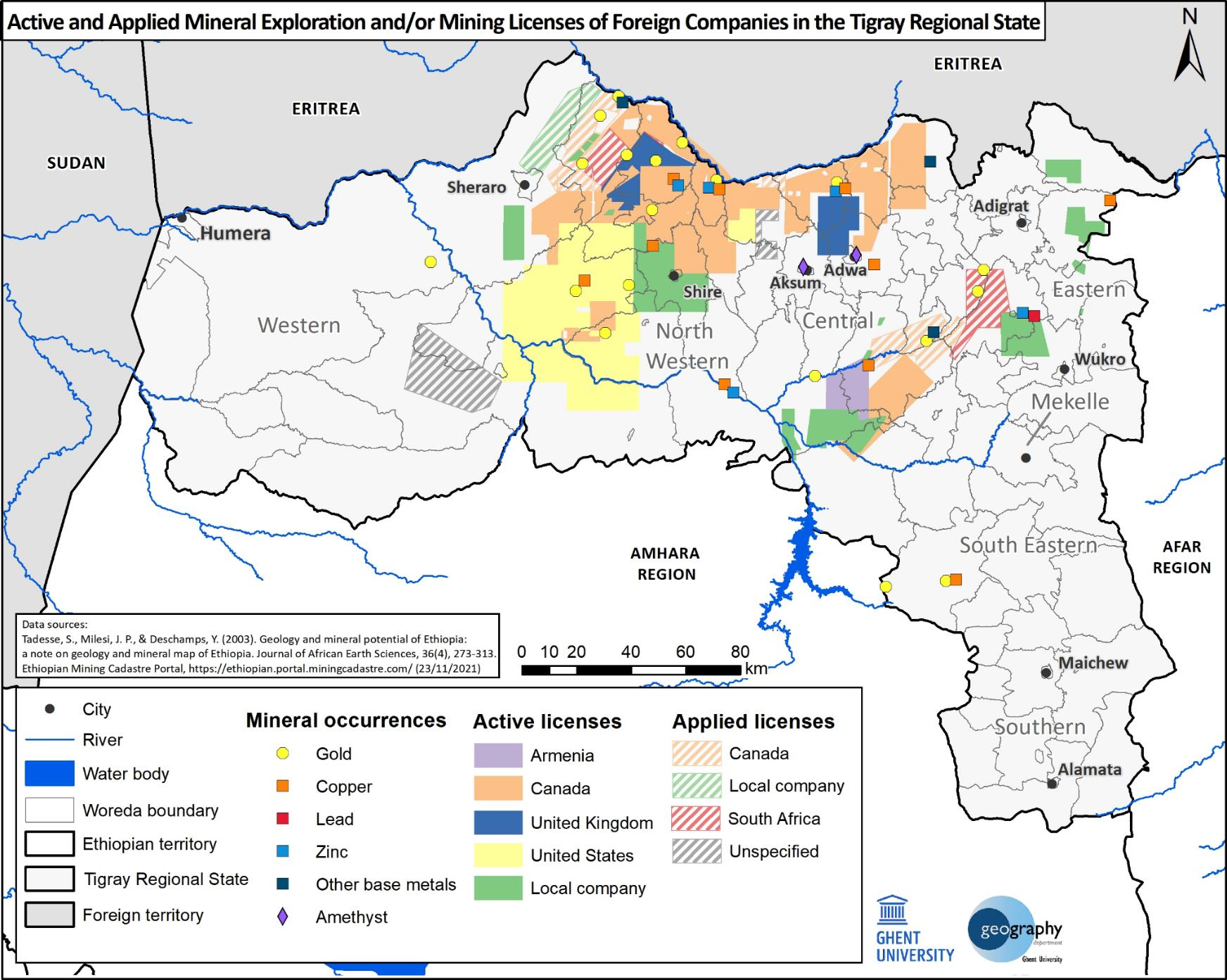
Gold and base metal potential; exploration concessions of foreign companies in the Tigray Region c. 2019

Production and sale of gold had touched a level of US$23.8 million (as of 2005) and that of tantalum is US$2.3 million. The mining stakes in Ethiopia are held by: The Ethiopian Mineral Development Share Company, a Government organization (EMDSC) (an amalgamation of earlier four Government enterprises) established in 2000 is engaged in all mining activities in the country; the Ezana Mining Development, functioning since 1993, a privately owned Ethiopian enterprise in consulting in all aspects related to mining including all types of explorations; the Midrock Gold, a subsidiary of Midrock Gold Group, in operation at Shakisso town in southern Ethiopia, is involved in gold mining (production of 3500 kg of gold per year extracting 50,000 tons of rock per month); and the National Mining Corporation (set up in 1993), a private company involved in all facets of mineral and petroleum product production including byproducts.

Potash mining has generated lot of interest in recent years. Allana Potash, a Canadian mining company is poised to start mining for potash in the Afar Regional State while the Indian Sainik Potash has been working in the Dallol depression.

Prospecting for iron, gold and base metals is also in progress in many regions of the country. More and more gold mines are being located, such as in the Afar region and in the Konso woreda in south western Ethiopia.

On 30 August 2012 it was announced that British firm Nyota Minerals was about to become the first foreign company to receive a mining licence to extract gold from an estimated resource of 52 tonnes in western Ethiopia.

== Human rights issues ==
The U.S. Department of Labor has reported that gold mining in Ethiopia makes use of child labor. In December 2014, the Department's List of Goods Produced by Child Labor or Forced Labor mentions gold among 3 other goods produced in similar working conditions.

Lega Dembi mine has been plagued with extreme human rights violations resulting from improper disposal of toxic chemicals including mercury, arsenic, and cyanide. Protests against the mine have been brutally repressed with mass arrests, killings, and disappearances.
