= Gewane-Mille mine =

Bentonite mine in Ethiopia

- Location: Ethiopia
- Products: Bentonite

The Gewane-Mille mine is a mine located in southern Ethiopia. It represents the largest bentonite reserve in the country, and has been estimated at 70 million tonnes.

== See also ==
- Dawa Okote mine
