= Confederation of Ethiopian Trade Unions =

Ethiopian National Trading Alliance Organization

CETU
- Confederation of Ethiopian Trade Unions
- Founded: January 1977
- Headquarters: Addis Ababa, Ethiopia
- Location: Ethiopia
- Members: 751,887
- Key people: Kassahun Follo, president
- Affiliations: WFTU

The Confederation of Ethiopian Trade Unions (CETU) is an alliance of trade unions in Ethiopia. As of March 2020, this group had 751,887 members. The CETU is affiliated with the World Federation of Trade Unions. The CETU has been described as being controlled by the government.

CETU was founded in January 1977 as the All-Ethiopia Trade Union (AETU). The AETU changed its name in 1986, to the Ethiopian Trade Union (ETU), then again in 1993 to the CETU.

In 2008, top management of the state-owned Bole Printing Enterprise disagreed with its trade union over worker compensation and unlawful termination. In late December a labor advisory board composed of state ministers, representatives of the employees, the CETU, and the management of Bole Printing found that both sides were at fault and called for employees terminated as a result of the dispute to be reinstated. The employees were expected to resume their duties.

CETU held its 23rd regular assembly 10 March 2009. They celebrated their successful resolution of a labor dispute at the Bole Printing Enterprise, and the Kaliti Food Share Company, while announcing their intent to unionize the growing flower industry in the country.
