= Foreign aid to Ethiopia =

Overview of aid

After World War II, Ethiopia began to receive economic development aid from the more affluent Western countries. Originally the United Kingdom was the primary source of this aid, but they withdrew in 1952, to be replaced by the United States. Between 1950 and 1970, one source estimated that Ethiopia received almost US$600 million in aid, $211.9 million from the US, $100 million from the Soviet Union and $121 million from the World Bank. Sweden trained the Imperial Bodyguard and India at one point contributed the majority of foreign-born schoolteachers in the Ethiopian educational system.

This aid dried up under the military regime that followed the Ethiopian Revolution, except for food aid during the early- to mid-1980s famine. While the Soviet Union provided extensive amounts of aid, either directly or through its allies like East Germany and South Yemen, this was predominantly in the form of either military aid, or ideological education; these ended with the close of the Cold War. Large aid inflows resumed in the early 1990s aimed at reconstruction and political stabilization but declined during the war with Eritrea. The post-2000 period, however, has seen a resumption of large disbursements of grants and loans from the United States, the European Union, individual European nations, Japan, the People's Republic of China, the World Bank, and the African Development Bank. These funds totaled US$1.6 billion in 2001.

In 2001 Ethiopia qualified for the World Bank-International Monetary Fund-sponsored Highly Indebted Poor Countries (HIPC) debt reduction program, which is designed to reduce or eliminate repayment of bilateral loans from wealthy countries and international lenders such as the World Bank. In Ethiopia's case, the program aims to help stabilize the country's balance of payments and to free up funds for economic development. A noteworthy advance toward these goals came in 1999, when the successor states to the former Soviet Union, including Russia, cancelled US$5 billion in debt contracted by the Derg, a step that cut Ethiopia's external debt in half. HIPC relief is expected to total almost US$2 billion.

In November 2007 the magazine The Economist reported that there was tangible evidence that the foreign aid given to Ethiopia reaches the people it is meant to, based on a visit to the south of the country. Roads, schools and water systems are being built and "there are few complaints about corruption, a fact that continues to make Ethiopia popular with foreign donors". However, the article also notes that, despite almost a decade of well-intentioned development policies, Ethiopians remain mired in the most wretched poverty.

In March 2010, the BBC claimed that it had evidence that millions of dollars earmarked for victims of the Ethiopian famine of 1984–85 went to buy weapons. Rebel soldiers apparently diverting the funding to their organisation in an attempt to overthrow the government. Their data were confirmed by participants and eye-witnesses of the time. However, following a complaint from the Band Aid Trust, the Editorial Complaints Unit of the BBC carried out "an investigation" and concluded that the reporting had no evidence to support it, and the BBC apologized to the Trust for the "misleading and unfair representation it created".

On 8 June 2023, the US Agency for International Development announced a temporary suspension of food aid to Ethiopia because its supplies are being diverted. One day later, the UN World Food Program also announced a suspension of aid citing the same concerns.
