= Dawa Okote mine =

Gold mine in Oromia, Ethiopia

Location
- Location: Oromia Region, Ethiopia

Production
- Products: Gold

The Dawa Okote mine is one of the largest gold mines in Ethiopia and the world. It is located in the central Oromia Region. The mine has estimated reserves of 20.035 million oz of gold.

== See also ==
- Gewane-Mille mine
