= Southern Nations, Nationalities, and Peoples' Region =

1992–2023 regional state of Ethiopia

Southern Nations, Nationalities, and Peoples' Region: የደቡብ ብሔር ብሔረሰቦችና ሕዝቦች ክልል (Amharic)
- Former regional state
- 1992–2023
- Flag Emblem

- Map of Ethiopia showing Southern Nations, Nationalities, and People's Region (1992 to 2020 boundaries)
- Capital: Hawassa
- Area
  - Coordinates: 6.5°N 37.1°E
- Population
  - 2023: 13,044,044
- History
  - Established: 1992
  - Disestablished: 2023
Succeeded by
| South Ethiopia Regional State |
| South West Ethiopia Peoples' Region |
| Central Ethiopia Regional State |
| Sidama Region |

The Southern Nations, Nationalities, and Peoples' Region (often abbreviated as SNNPR; Amharic: የደቡብ ብሔር ብሔረሰቦችና ሕዝቦች ክልል, romanized: Yädäbub Bḥer Bḥeräsäbočna Hzboč Kllə) was a regional state in southwestern Ethiopia. It was formed from the merger of five kililoch, called Regions 7 to 11, following the regional council elections on 21 June 1992. Its government was based in Hawassa.

The SNNPR bordered Kenya to the south (including a small part of Lake Turkana), the Ilemi Triangle (a region claimed by Kenya and South Sudan) to the southwest, Oromia region to the north and east. The capital city of the region was Hawassa. The region included major cities and towns like Wolaita Sodo, Arba Minch, Jinka, Dila, Boditi, Areka, Butajira, Welkite, Bonga, Hosaena and Worabe.

The region dissolved when Sidama Region, Southwest Ethiopia Region, South Ethiopia Regional State and Central Ethiopia Regional State emerged independently.

In June 2020, following the formation of the Sidama Region the region's capital Hawassa is located outside of the boundaries of the region. The then regional government planned to move to a city within the region's boundaries after two consecutive national electoral cycles. The largest cities in the region were Sodo with a population of 194,977 and Arba Minch with a population of 151,013.

The dissolution of the region was certain when on 18 August 2023 the South Ethiopia Regional State was created following the 2023 South Ethiopia Region referendum with remainder of the SNNPR becoming the Central Ethiopia Regional State.

== Demographics ==
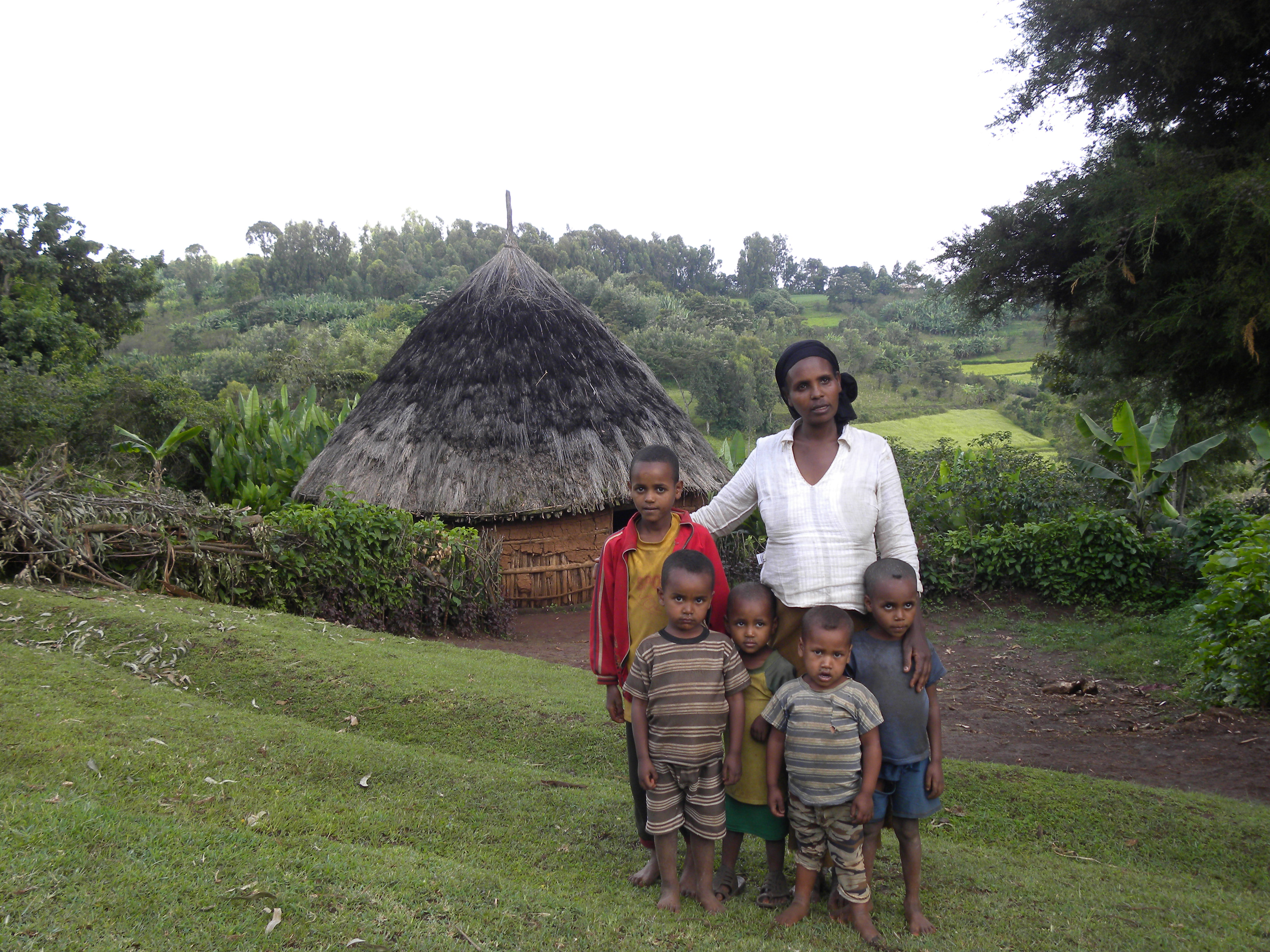
Kambaata family in front of their tukul in the Kembata Tembaro Zone

Based on the 2007 Census conducted by the Central Statistical Agency of Ethiopia (CSA), the SNNPR regional state had an estimated total population of 17,929,548, of whom 8,425,918 were men and 8,503,630 women. 13,433,991 or 89.98% of the population are estimated to be rural inhabitants, while 1,495,557 or 10.02% are urban; this makes the SNNPR Ethiopia's most rural region. With an estimated area of 105,887.18 square kilometers, this region has an estimated density of 141 people per square kilometer. For the entire region 3,110,995 households were counted, which results in an average for the region of 4.8 persons to a household, with urban households having on average 3.9 and rural households 4.9 people. The projected population for 2017 was 19,170,007.

In the previous census, conducted in 1994, the region's population was reported to be 10,377,028 of whom 5,161,787 were men and 5,215,241 were women. At the time of the census, the rural population of the Region accounted for 93.2% of the total population. Semien Omo, Wolayita, and Gurage were the three zones with the highest population. The population is concentrated mostly in eastern, northern and central part of the SNNPR while the western and southern part of the region is sparsely populated.

The SNNPR Water Resources Bureau announced that as of the fiscal year ending in 2006, they had increased the area of the region that had access to drinkable water to 54% from 10 to 15% 15 years ago. In August 2008, the head of public relations for the Bureau, Abdulkerim Nesru, announced that 94 million birr had been spent to further increase the availability of drinkable water in the region from 58% in the previous year to 63.6%. Priority was given to certain zones, such as Sidama, Welayta and Gurage, as well as the Alaba special woreda and several resettlement areas.

Values for other reported common indicators of the standard of living for the SNNPR as of 2005 include the following: 10.7% of the inhabitants fall into the lowest wealth quintile; adult literacy for men is 57% and for women 22.4%; and the Regional infant mortality rate is 85 infant deaths per 1,000 live births, which is greater than the nationwide average of 77; at least half of these deaths occurred in the infants' first month of life.

Historical population
| Year | Pop. | ±% |
|---|---|---|
| 1994 | 10,377,028 | — |
| 2007 | 17,929,548 | +72.8% |
| 2017 | 36,170,007 | +101.7% |

=== Religion ===
| Religion | 1994 Census | 2007 Census |
|---|---|---|
| Orthodox Christians | 34.6% | 41.9% |
| Protestants | 21.8% | 38.5% |
| Muslim | 15.2% | 14.1% |
| Roman Catholics | 3% | 3.2% |
| Traditional religions | 26.4% | 2.4% |
| Other religious affiliations | — | 0.5% |

=== Ethnicities ===
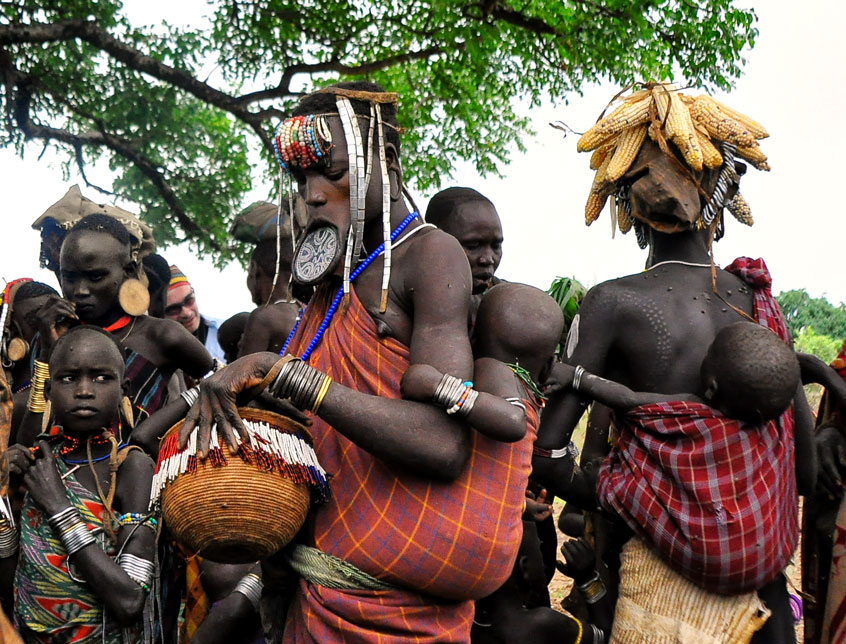
Mursi people

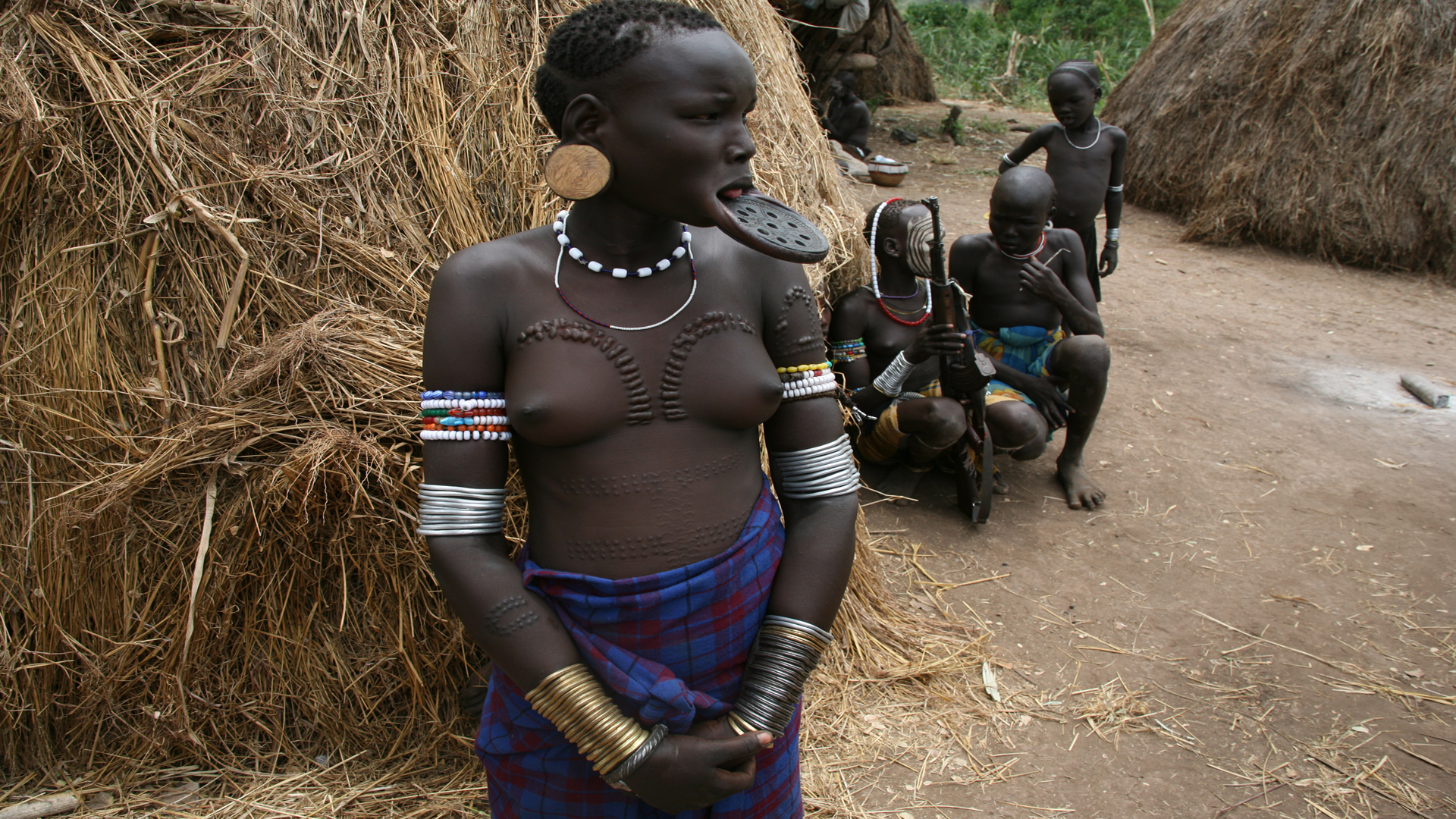
Surma people

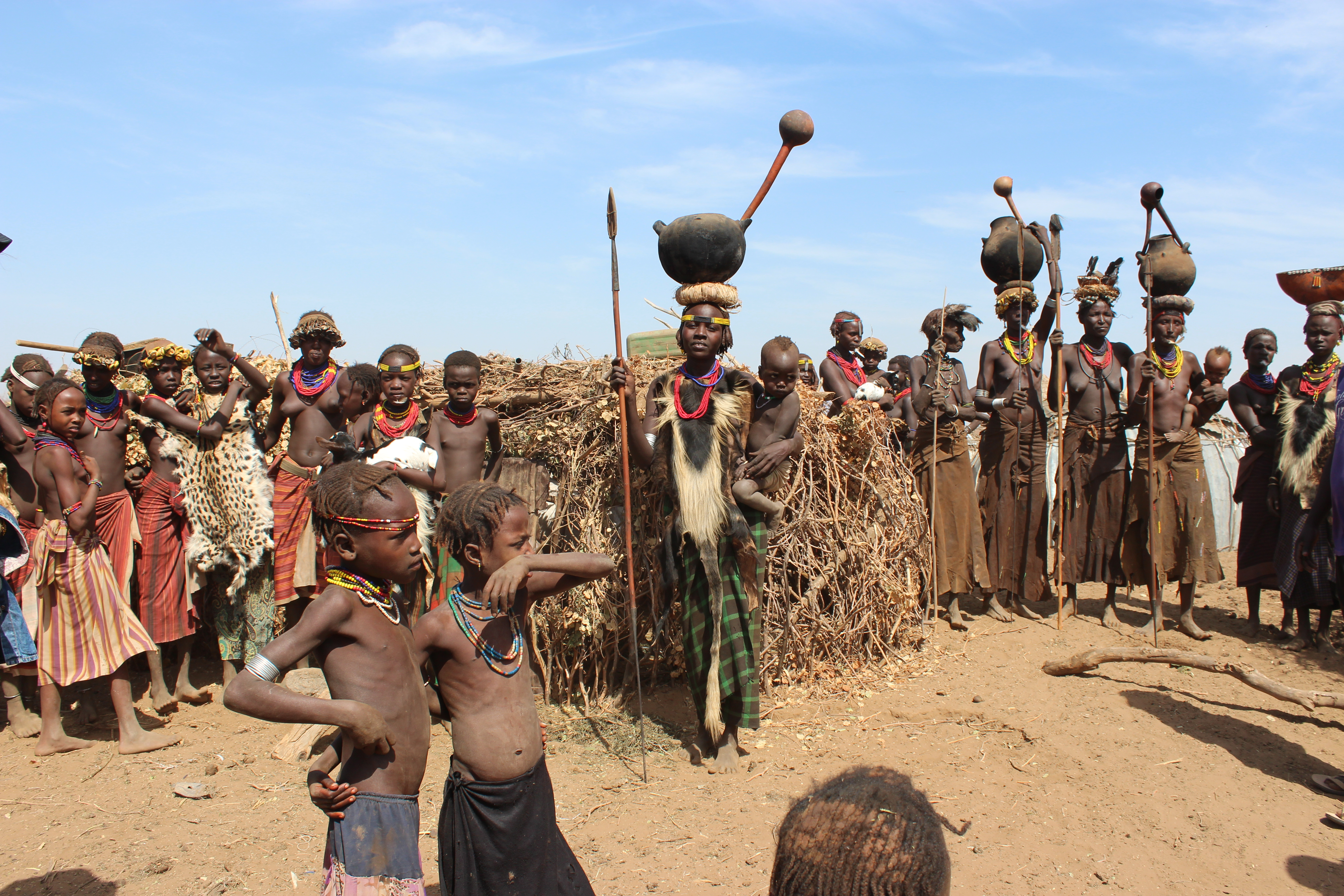
Daasanach people

The SNNPR, being an amalgam of the main homelands of numerous ethnicities, contains over 45 indigenous ethnic groups:

Largest ethnicities
| People | 1994 Census | 2007 Census |
|---|---|---|
| Welayta | 20% | 20.59% |
| Hadiya | - | 7.98% |
| Gurage | 15% | 19.54% |
| Gamo | - | 14% |
| Kafficho | - | 6.44% |
| Silt'e | - | 7.37% |
| Amhara | - | 4.10% |

All ethnicities in region

The ethnicities native to the SNNPR, with percentages of the population as reported in the 2007 national census and organized by linguistic grouping, include:

- Cushitic:
  - Alaba – 1.35%, mostly in Alaba special woreda
  - Tembaro – 1.32%, mostly in Tembaro Woreda.
  - Arbore – 0.04%
  - Daasanach – 0.32%, mostly in Dasenech (woreda)
  - Dirashe – 0.2%, mostly in Dirashe special woreda
  - Gawwada – 0.43%, mostly in Dirashe special woreda
  - Gedeo – 4.9%, mostly in Gedeo Zone
  - Hadiya – 7.98%, mostly in Hadiya Zone
  - Kambaata – 3.82%, mostly in Kembata Tembaro Zone
  - Burji – 0.38%, mostly in Burji special woreda
  - Konso – 1.47%, mostly in Konso special woreda
  - Libido (or Mareqo) – 0.38%, mostly in Mareko (woreda)
  - Sidama – 19.38%, mostly in the former Sidama Zone
  - Kebena – 1.21% mostly in Kebena
  - Tsamai – 0.13%, mostly in Bena Tsemay (woreda)
- Nilo-Saharan:
  - Bodi – 0.04%
  - Kichepo
  - Kwegu – 0.01%
  - Me'en – 1%
  - Mursi – 0.05%, mostly in South Omo Zone
  - Nyangatom – 0.12%, mostly in Nyangatom
  - Shabo, mostly in Keficho Shekicho Zone
  - Shita people
  - Suri/Surma – 0.17%, mostly in Surma (woreda)
- Omotic:
  - Aari – 1.9%, mostly in Bako Gazer (woreda)
  - Basketo – 0.52%, mostly in Basketo special woreda
  - Bench – 2.34%, mostly in Bench Maji Zone
  - Chara – 0.08%, mostly in South Omo Zone
  - Dawro – 3.28%, mostly in Dawro Zone
  - Dime – < 0.01%
  - Dizi – 0.23%, mostly in Maji (woreda)
  - Dorze, mostly in Chencha (woreda)
  - Gamo – 7%, mostly in Gamo Gofa Zone
  - Goffa – 2.41%, mostly in Gamo Gofa Zone
  - Hamar – 0.31%, mostly in Hamer (woreda)
  - Kachama, mostly in Arba Minch (woreda)
  - Karo – 0.01%
  - Kafficho – 5.44%, mostly in Keffa Zone
  - Konta – 0.54%, mostly in Konta special woreda
  - Koorete – 1.02%, mostly in Amaro special woreda
  - Male – 0.59%, mostly in Male (woreda)
  - Mello, mostly in Melokoza (woreda)
  - Oyda – 0.25%, mostly in Oyda (woreda)
  - Shakacho – 0.44%, mostly in Sheka Zone
  - Sheko – 0.24%, mostly in Sheko (woreda)
  - Welayta – 10.59%, mostly in Wolayita Zone
  - Yem (Yemse) – 0.5%, mostly in Yem special woreda
- Semitic:
  - Amhara – 4.10%, widespread
  - Gurage – 17.57, mostly in Gurage Zone
  - Silte – 5.37%, mostly in Silt'e Zone
  - Zayse – 0.1%, mostly in the Lake Zway area
  - Zergula

=== Languages ===
The 2007 census reported that the predominantly spoken mother tongue languages include Sidama (19.59%), Welayta (34.48%), Hadiya (8%), Gurage (7.13%), Gamo (6.9%), Kafa (5.36%) and Amharic (4.10%). Other languages spoken in the State include Kambaata, Melo, Gofa, Gedeo and Dime; because of the relatively few number of speakers of most of the languages in the region, the working language of the state is Amharic (the most widely spoken language in Ethiopia and formerly the only official language).

The 1994 census reported that the predominantly spoken languages include Sidamo (16%), Gurage (14.72%), Welayta (18.53%), Hadiya (8.53%), Kafa (5.22%), and Kambaata (4.35%). Other languages spoken in the State include Gamo, Melo, Gofa, and Gedeo.

Amharic is still the working language although most pupils get eight years of primary education in their home language and all secondary and further education is in English.

== Agriculture ==
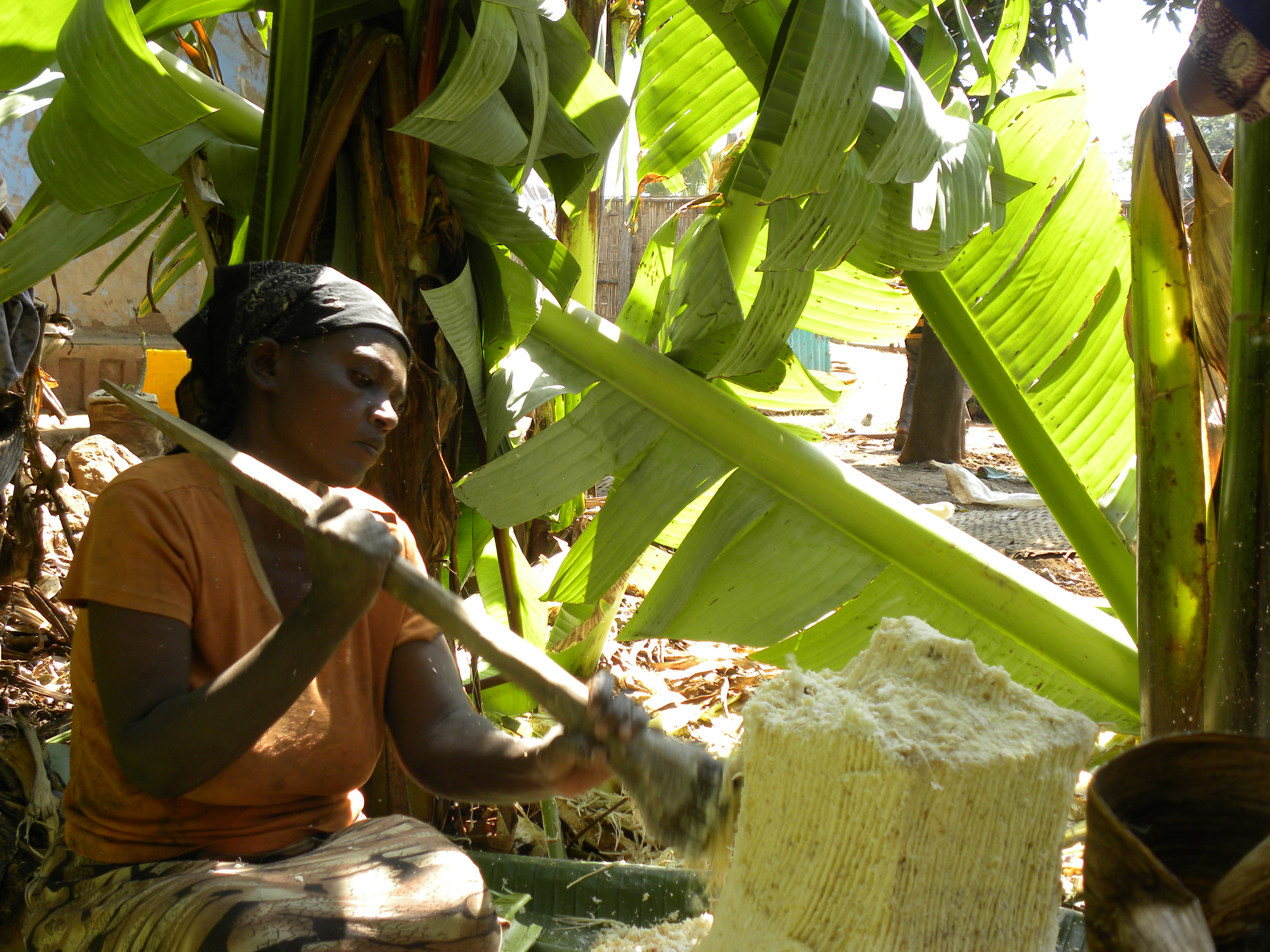
A Kambaata woman extracting the edible part of an enset (a major staple crop of the SNNPR) with a traditional tool.

The CSA reported that for 2004–2005 100,338 tons of coffee were produced in the SNNPR, based on inspection records from the Ethiopian Coffee and Tea authority. This represents 44.2% of the total production in Ethiopia.

Farmers in the Region had an estimated total 7,938,490 head of cattle (representing 20.5% of Ethiopia's total cattle), 3,270,200 sheep (18.8%), 2,289,970 goats (17.6%), 298,720 horses (19.7%), 63,460 mules (43.1%), 278,440 asses (11.1%), 6,586,140 poultry of all species (21.3%), and 726,960 beehives (16.7%).

Enset is a major indigenous local crop in the SNNPR.

== List of chief administrators ==
- Abate Kisho (SEPDM), 1992–2001
- Hailemariam Desalegn, 12 November 2001 – March 2006
- Shiferaw Shigute (SEPDM), March 2006 – July 2013
- Dessie Dalke, July 2013 – 2018
- Million Mathiwos, 2018 – 2019
- Erstu Yirdaw, 31 August 2019 – 18 August 2023

== Administrative zones ==
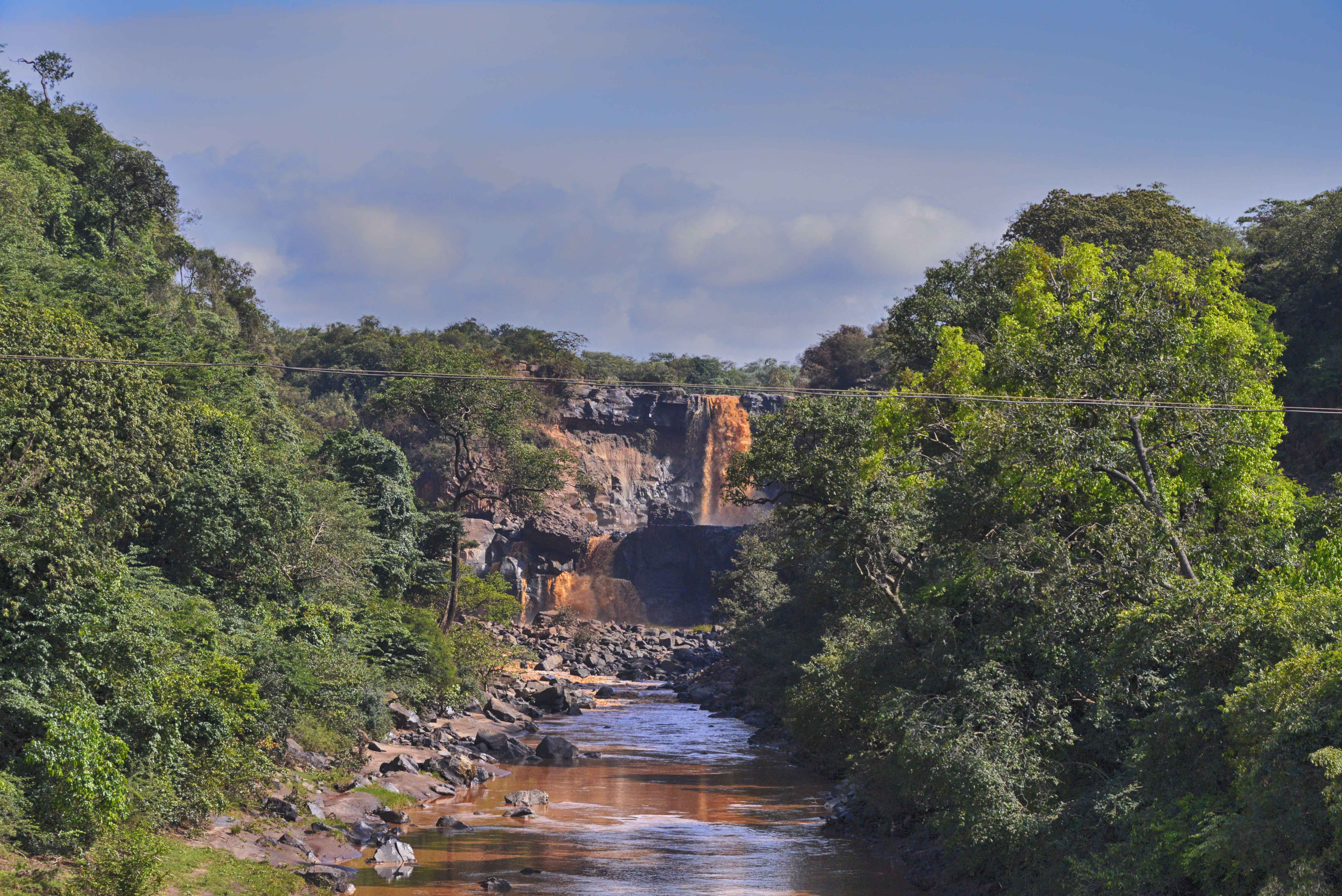
Waterfalls in Arba Mich

The following table shows administrative zones and special woredas (an administrative subdivision which is similar to an autonomous area) is based on information from 2022; the list of second administrative level bodies maintained by the United Nations Geographic Information Working Group dates from 2002.

Zones and Special Woredas in SNNPR
| Number | Zone | Seat | Notes |
|---|---|---|---|
| 1 | Ale special woreda | Kolango | Included in South Ethiopia Regional State and got Zonal status in August 2023 |
| 2 | Amaro special woreda | Kele | Included in South Ethiopia Regional State and got Zonal status in August 2023 |
| 3 | Basketo special woreda | Laska | Included in South Ethiopia Regional State and got Zonal status in August 2023 |
| 4 | Bench Sheko | Mizan Teferi | Included in South West Ethiopia Peoples' Regional State |
| 5 | Burji special woreda | Soyama | Included in South Ethiopia Regional State and got Zonal status in August 2023 |
| 6 | Dawro Zone | Tarcha | Included in South West Ethiopia Peoples' Regional State |
| 7 | Dirashe special woreda | Gidole | Included in South Ethiopia Regional State and got Zonal status in August 2023 |
| 8 | Gamo Zone | Arba Minch | Included in South Ethiopia Regional State |
| 9 | Gedeo Zone | Dilla | Included in South Ethiopia Regional State |
| 10 | Gofa Zone | Sawula | Included in South Ethiopia Regional State |
| 11 | Gurage Zone | Welkite | Included in Central Ethiopia Regional State |
| 12 | Hadiya Zone | Hosaena | Included in Central Ethiopia Regional State |
| 13 | Halaba Zone | Halaba Kulito | Included in Central Ethiopia Regional State |
| 14 | Keffa Zone | Bonga | Included in South West Ethiopia Peoples' Regional State |
| 15 | Kembata Tembaro Zone | Durame | Included in Central Ethiopia Regional State |
| 16 | Konso Zone | Karati | Included in South Ethiopia Regional State |
| 17 | Konta special woreda | Amaya | Included in South West Ethiopia Peoples' Regional State and got Zonal status in 2021 |
| 18 | Sheka Zone | Tepi | Included in South West Ethiopia Peoples' Regional State |
| 19 | Sidama Zone | Hawassa | Got Regional state status in 2020 |
| 20 | Silt'e Zone | Worabe | Included in Central Ethiopia Regional State |
| 21 | South Omo Zone | Jinka | Included in South Ethiopia Regional State |
| 22 | West Omo Zone | Jemu | Included in South West Ethiopia Peoples' Regional State |
| 23 | Wolayita Zone | Wolaita Sodo | Included in South Ethiopia Regional State |
| 24 | Yem special woreda | Saja | Included in Central Ethiopia Regional State and got Zonal status in August 2023 |

=== Former zones ===
- Keficho Shekicho Zone
- North Omo Zone

== See also ==
- List of districts in the Southern Nations, Nationalities, and Peoples' Region
