= 2023 South Ethiopia Region referendum =

Southern Ethiopian autonomy referendum

- 6 February 2023
- Do you support the organisation of the six zones (Konso, Wolayita, South Omo, Gamo, Gedeo, Gofa) and the special woredas (Burji, Basketo, Ale, Amaro, Dirashe) into one common region?

Results
Choice	Votes	%
Yes	2,398,469	95.22%
No	120,501	4.78%
Valid votes	2,518,970	96.73%
Invalid or blank votes	85,189	3.27%
Total votes	2,604,159	100.00%
Registered voters/turnout	2,791,882	99.86%

Results
For	95.22%
Against	4.78%
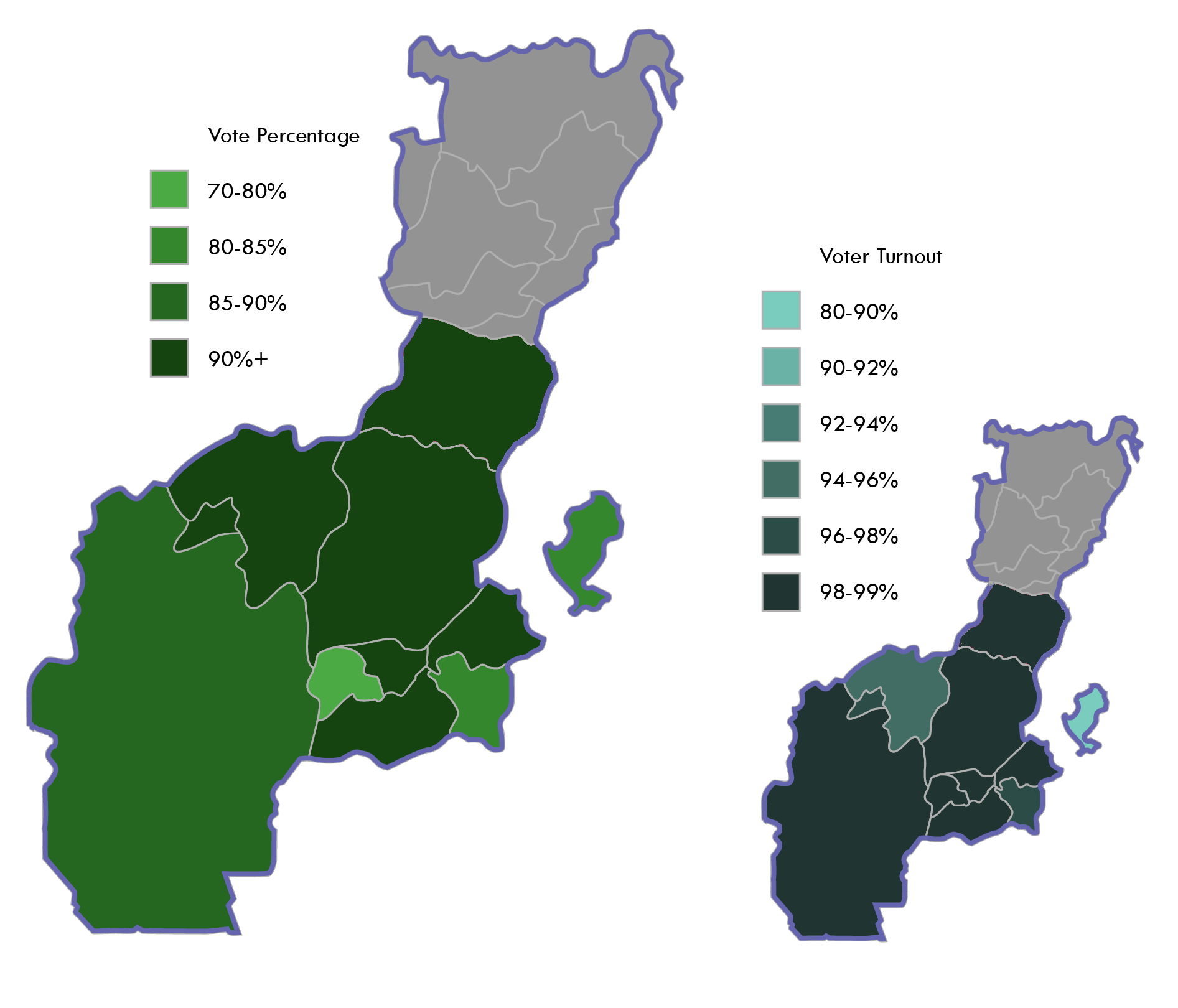
- Results by zone and woreda

On 6 February 2023 a referendum was held in the Wolayita, Gamo, Gofa, South Omo, Gedeo, and Konso Zones, as well as the Dirashe, Amaro, Burji, Ale, and Basketo special woredas of the Southern Nations, Nationalities, and Peoples' Region (SNNP) of Ethiopia, on whether the included areas should leave SNNP and form their own Region.

This referendum follows two previous referendums from 2019 and 2021 in other areas of the then-SNNP, both of which resulted in votes to split off into new regions.

The referendum was tentatively approved, although Wolayita Zone had to rerun voting after it was found that irregularities were present. The approval of the new region in the other zones and woredas was conveyed to the national House of Federation by the SNNP government. The new region's name was set as the South Ethiopia Region. Wolayita Zone reran the referendum successfully in the summer, with a majority also voting in favor of a new region. The House of Federation unanimously voted in favour of the creation of the new region on 5 July 2023. The remaining part of the SNNP was renamed to the Central Ethiopia Region.

== Background ==
The Constitution of Ethiopia grants every ethnic group the right to have their own region in Ethiopia. The Southern Nations, Nationalities, and Peoples' Region (SNNP) previously contained 56 ethnic groups. The ascension of prime minister Abiy Ahmed in 2018, along with his promises for reforms, reignited demands for autonomy by some ethnic groups in SNNP. The 2019 Sidama Region referendum saw the Sidama Region split off from the SNNP. A similar referendum in 2021 saw 5 zones and 1 special woreda leave the SNNP and form the new South West Region.

At the end of July 2022, 10 zones and 6 special woredas in SNNP passed resolutions aiming to split off two new states from what remained of the SNNP. These resolutions were greeted positively by the SNNP government. (There were reports that the Gurage Zone was also involved, however it wished to continue with a proposal it had submitted on 26 November 2018 to become its own region.)

The South Ethiopia Region (in purple) following the 2023 referendum and secession, note the territory that split off following the 2019 Sidama Region referendum and the 2021 South West Region referendum (in pink and lighter purple), as well as the Central region that did not have a referendum and did not secede, hence being somewhat of a successor to the former big region.

On 5 August, the SNNP Council submitted the requests to the House of Federation. The Speaker of the House of Federation noted that the House would come to a quick decision, and tasked the National Election Board of Ethiopia with looking into carrying out the referendums. Official approval of the referendum by the House of Federation for the proposal given by from 6 zones and 5 special woredas occurred on 18 August. Specifically, this was for the Wolayita, Gamo, Gofa, South Omo, Gedeo, and Konso Zones, as well as the Dirashe, Amaro, Burji, Ale, and Basketo special woredas. (The simultaneous request, from the Hadiya, Halaba, Kembata Tembaro, and Silte Zones, and the Yem Special Woreda request has not yet been acted upon.) The House of Federation requested the referendum, for a new South Ethiopia Region, be held within three months.

In September the National Election Board submitted a budget request to the House of Peoples' Representatives.

On 10 October the National Election Board announced that a referendum would be held in parts of Southern Nations, Nationalities, and Peoples' Region on 6 February, targeting results to be released on 15 February. Campaigning began on 17 October, and voter registration ran for two weeks beginning on 20 December. By 9 January, 2,934,143 voters had registered, and registration for 24 polling stations was extended.

== Logistics ==
The National Election Board expected to hire 18,885 people, and requested 541,270,104.82 birr to carry out the referendum. 410.1 million birr was given. 5,200 election observers from Ethiopia and elsewhere were expected.

3,771 polling stations were set up, divided into 31 groups. These are expected to see around 3 million voters. Each polling station is expected to release its results over the five days following the referendum. To assist those with reading difficulties, each option on the referendum was also represented by an easily identifiable symbol: a white dove for a vote in favor of a new region, and a hut for a vote against.

== Results ==
Full results were initially expected on 15 February, and partial results were released on 18 February. The National Election Board announced on 20 February that a majority had voted to secede, although the official results from the Wolayita Zone were still pending as the board stated a variety of irregularities occurred before and during the vote. These irregularities are possibly due to a longstanding campaign for Wolayita to become a region on its own. Of the areas with approved results, the largest opposition came from the Gedeo zone. The referendum in the Wolayita Zone was rerun on 19 June, and its results were released eight days later.

Choice	Votes	%
For	2,398,469	95.22
Against	120,501	4.78
Total	2,518,970	100.00
Valid votes	2,518,970	96.73
Invalid/blank votes	85,189	3.27
Total votes	2,604,159	100.00
Registered voters/turnout	2,791,882	93.28
Source: NEBE (summary). Wolayita: NEBE

=== Result by subdivision ===
Subdivision	For	%	Against	%	Invalid	Registered voters	Turnout %
Wolayita Zone	752,044	94.77	41,531	5.23	44,938	840,226	99.80
Konso Zone	101,114	98.17	1,890	1.83	2,180	111,561	94.28
South Omo Zone	256,159	97.95	5,364	2.05	5,273	297,948	89.54
Gamo Zone	583,757	98.37	9,682	1.63	8,141	630,340	95.44
Gedeo Zone	241,695	83.79	46,749	16.21	11,941	372,754	80.59
Gofa Zone	243,327	95.19	12,306	4.81	8,471	289,307	91.29
Burji special woreda	28,460	97.38	765	2.62	676	36,123	82.78
Basketo special woreda	27,674	96.07	1,133	3.93	1,098	32,639	91.62
Ale special woreda	22,395	98.19	412	1.81	710	29,950	78.52
Amaro special woreda	90,377	99.76	216	0.24	598	94,233	96.77
Dirashe special woreda	51,467	99.13	453	0.87	1,163	56,801	93.45
