= Halaba Kulito =

Town in Halaba Zone, Central Ethiopia Regional State, Ethiopia

Halaba Kulito ሀላባ ቁሊቶ Kulito
- Location within Ethiopia
- Coordinates: 7°18′44″N 38°05′21″E
- Country: Ethiopia
- Region: Central Ethiopia Regional State
- Zone: Halaba
- Elevation: 1,726 m (5,663 ft)

Population (2005)
  - Total: 27,359
- Time zone: UTC+3 (EAT)
- Climate: Aw

Halaba Kulito (also known as Kulito or Kuliito) is a town in southern Ethiopia. Located in the Halaba Zone of Central Ethiopia Regional State (CERS), this town sits on the left bank of the Bilate River, with an elevation of 1726 meters above sea level. Halaba Kulito's total population is 300, 000. Halaba Kulito is the administrative center of the Halaba Zone.

According to the CERS's Bureau of Finance and Economic Development, as of 2003 Halaba Kulito's amenities include digital telephone access, postal service, 24-hour electrical service, and a bank.

== History ==
The Town of Halaba Kulito is believed to have been founded towards the end of the 19th century, around 1896.

Kulito was known as a center of Muslim settlement, with over 1,000 students in Koran schools in 1974. Ethiopian radio reported on 29 October 1996 that the remains of five youths alleged to have been killed between 1978 and 1979 through the direct involvement of senior Derg officials had been exhumed in the premises of the police station by a team of Argentine archaeologists by order of the special prosecutor.

== Demographics ==
Based on figures from the Central Statistical Agency in 2005, this town has an estimated total population of 27,359 of whom 13,741 were males and 13,618 were females.

The 1994 census reported this town had a total population of 15,101 of whom 7,608 were males and 7,493 were females. The five largest ethnic groups reported in Halaba Kulito were the Amhara (18.77%), the Kambaata (18.01%), the Halaba (12.91%), the Silte (11.83%), and the Welayta (11.18%); all other ethnic groups made up 22.32% of the population. Amharic is spoken as a first language by 53.39%, 12.91% speak Halabisa, 10.85% Kambaata, 7.83% Welayta, and 6.62% speak Silte; the remaining 8.4% spoke all other primary languages reported.

Concerning migration patterns, the municipality reported that after the harvest time in December/January, there were influxes of rural people to the town, predominantly men, who come to work trade or build houses. They return to their villages in June at the beginning of the planting season. It was estimated that between five and ten thousand people migrate to the town from the countryside every year.

== Economy ==
Halaba Kulito is an important marketing and communication center, connected by asphalt road to the capital Addis Ababa, Shashamane and Arba Minch, and by gravel road to Hosaena. In addition, a new asphalt road through Halaba from Butajira to Addis Ababa emphasizes the town's economic importance. The civic road network is arranged in four tiers as follows: principal arterials, which are 26–30 meters wide; collector roads, 16–20 meters wide; minor arterials, 20–26 meters wide; and local roads, 10–16 meters wide.

The weekly market for this town is on Thursdays, and is known as one of the largest open markets in Ethiopia. The area around Halaba Kulito is famous for its production of red pepper (Berbere); hundreds of quintals of this crop are transported every week to Addis Ababa, Dessie, and other urban centers. The other cash crops include maize and teff, which are also transported to other towns including Awassa, Dilla and Shashamane.

According to a report by the local health center, Halaba Kulito had a high incidence of water related diseases, usually caused by stagnant water, especially in Summer. The most common disease in the town is malaria.
