= List of Ethiopian regional states by population =

Territorial subdivisions of Ethiopia by population

The following table presents a list of Ethiopian regional states by population based on the 1994 and 2007 censuses with the Statistics Ethiopia estimated population as of July 2023.

Region	1994 Census	2007 Census	2023 Worldometer	2025
Oromia	18,732,525	26,993,933	40,884,000	44,597,300
Amhara	13,834,297	17,221,976	23,216,000	32,935,900
South (Note: Created from the remainder of the former SNNP in 2023)	4,197,164	7,594,741	9,670,000	7,842,000
Somali	3,439,860	4,445,219	6,657,000	12,615,000
Central (Note: Part of the former SNNP until 2023)	2,120,631	4,310,923	6,271,761	9,521,300
Tigray	3,136,267	4,316,988	5,838,000	7,467,000
Sidama (Note: Part of the former SNNP until 2020)	2,044,836	2,954,136	5,301,868	4,868,000
Afar	1,106,383 (Note: Afar data from 1996)	1,852,274	4,576,000	2,525,000
South West (Note: Part of the former SNNP until 2021)	1,600,000	2,306,984	4,197,164	2,473,000
Addis Ababa	2,112,737	2,739,551	3,945,000	6,287,000
Benishangul-Gumuz	162,397	784,345	1,251,000	1,096,000
Dire Dawa	251,864	341,834	551,000	600,000
Gambela	181,862	307,096	525,000	496,000
Harari	131,139	183,415	283,000	312,000
Total	55,600,000	73,918,505	128,700,000	128,635,800
