= Koshe, Ethiopia =

Town in Central Ethiopia

Koshe
- Town
- Location within Ethiopia
- Coordinates: 8°0′47.87″N 38°31′55.46″E
- Country: Ethiopia
- Region: Central Ethiopia Regional State
- Special Woreda: Mareko special woreda
- Elevation: 1,885 m (6,184 ft)
- Time zone: UTC+3 (East Africa Time)

Koshe is town in central Ethiopia. Koshe serves as the administrative seat of Mareko special woreda of Central Ethiopia Regional State. The town is located at 8° 0' 47.87" N, 38° 31' 55.46" E, and its altitude is 1,885 meters above sea level. Koshe is a home of Mareko people and located in 197 km south from Addis Ababa. After disintegration of the former SNNPR and formation of Central Ethiopia Regional State in 2023, Mareko woreda became a special woreda and Koshe remained as the seat of the special woreda under newly established Central Ethiopia Regional State. Koshe serves as the seat of the special woreda.

== Infrastructures ==
Koshe has infrastructures such as paved roads and electric service, health centers, public market services, hotels and restaurant services, pure water services and telecommunication services.
