= Kambaata =

Kambaata may refer to:

- the Kambaata people
- the Kambaata language
