= Basketo =

Basketo may refer to:

- the Basketo people
- the Basketo language
- Basketo special woreda
