= Libido language =

Afroasiatic language spoken in Ethiopia

Libido
- Mareqo, Mareko
- Libixxiso
- Native to: Ethiopia
- Region: Gurage, Hadiya, Kembata regions
- Native speakers: 64,000 (2007 census)
- Language family: Afro-Asiatic: Cushitic; Highland East; Hadiyya; Libido
- Writing system: Latin

Language codes
- ISO 639-3: liq
- Glottolog: libi1250

Libido (also known as Libixxiso, Mareqo, Mareko, Marekinga) is an Afroasiatic language of Ethiopia, which is spoken in the Mareko special woreda in the Central Ethiopia Regional State, directly south-east of Butajira. According to the information of the Central Statistical Authority (2007) census, 64,381 people speak the language as their mother tongue. Most of them are multilingual, due to contact with other languages.

== Classification ==
It is closely related to Hadiyya (a dialect per Blench 2006) within the Highland East Cushitic languages.

== Orthography ==
Libido has become written in recent times, following motivation from the Ethiopian language policy to use the Latin script; the language has also been taught since 2002 for grades 1 to 4.

Libido alphabet
Letter	A a	B b	C c	D d	E e	F f	G g	H h	I i	J j	K k	L l	M m	N n
IPA	[a]	[b]	[ʧʼ]	[d]	[e]	[f]	[g]	[h]	[i]	[ʤ]	[k]	[l]	[m]	[n]
Letter	O o	Q q	R r	S s	T t	U u	W w	X x	Y y	Z z	CH ch	PH ph	Sh sh	’
IPA	[o]	[kʼ]	[r]	[s]	[t]	[u]	[w]	[tʼ]	[j]	[z]	[ʧ]	[pʼ]	[ʃ]	[ʔ]

== Grammar ==
Its syntax is SOV; its verb has passive, reflexive and causative constructions, as well as a middle voice.
