= Derba, Amaro =

Coordinates: 05°50′N 37°54′E

Kele is a small town in the Amaro special woreda of Southern Nations, Nationalities, and Peoples Region, Ethiopia. It is situated about 400 km south of the capital Addis Ababa.
