= Hosaena =

Town in Central Ethiopia Regional State, Ethiopia

Hosaena: Hossana (Hadiyya); ሆሣዕና (Amharic)
- Town
- Location within Ethiopia
- Coordinates: 7°33′N 37°51′E
- Country: Ethiopia
- Region: Central Ethiopia Regional State
- Zone: Hadiya
- Elevation: 2,177 m (7,142 ft)

Population (2007)
  - Total: 69,995
  - Estimate (2021): 179,761
- Time zone: UTC+3 (EAT)
- Climate: Cfb

Hossana, Hossaena, Hosanna, or Hosaina is a city which level as a Region, Zone in central Ethiopia, and currently serve as the administrative center of Hadiya Zone and Central Ethiopia Regional State as well. Geographically located in Central Ethiopia, south of the capital Addis Ababa with a latitude and longitude of 7°33′N 37°51′E with an elevation of 2177 meters above sea level. It was part of Lemo woreda and is surrounded by it.

A nearby landmark is the rock-hewn Dawabelo Cave, whose rock-hewn pillars suggest that it is an unfinished monolithic church. An all-weather road was built in 1963 by the Gurage Road Association, which connected Hossana to Addis Ababa by way of Welkite and Endibir. According to the SNNPR's Bureau of Finance and Economic Development, as of 2003 Hosaena's amenities include digital telephone access, postal service, 24-hour electrical service, a bank and a hospital.

== History ==
In 1910 Hosaena became the administrative center of the province of Hadiya. The town was occupied by the Italians on 11 February 1937. By 1958 Hosaena was one of 27 places in Ethiopia ranked as First Class Township.

In 1929, a pair of missionaries settled in the town, their efforts leading to Hosaena becoming a center of Protestant Christianity in southern Ethiopia; as early as December 1949, the town hosted a Bible conference, attended by 800 persons. In April 1970, the administrative center of the Kembata Synod of the Mekane Yesus Church was officially moved from Durame to Hosaena; the synod was later renamed the "South Central Synod."

== Demographics ==
Based on the 2007 Census conducted by the CSA, this woreda has a total population of 69,995, of whom 35,523 are men and 34,472 women. The majority of the inhabitants were Protestants, with 65.74% of the population reporting that belief, 24.6% practiced Ethiopian Orthodox Christianity, 6.57% were Muslim, and 1.99% were Catholic.

The 1994 national census reported this town had a total population of 31,701 of whom 15,593 were men and 16,108 were women.

== Sports ==
Hadiya Hossana FC is the most popular sports club from Hossana. They played numerous matches in the Ethiopian Premier League, the top-flight football league of Ethiopia. Hadiya Hossana Football Club use the 5,000-capacity Abiyo Ersamo Stadium for home games.
