= Halaba =

Zone in the Central Ethiopia Regional State

Coordinates: 7°25′N 38°15′E

Map of the regions and zones of Ethiopia

Halaba is a zone in the Central Ethiopia Regional State. It is named after the Halaba people, and covers part of their homeland. Located in the Great Rift Valley, Halaba zone is bordered on the south by an exclave of Hadiya Zone, on the southwest by the Kembata Zone, on the west and north by Hadiya Zone, on the north east by Lake Shala, and on the east by Oromia Region; the Bilate River, which is its major body of water, defines its western boundary. The administrative center is halaba Kulito.

== Overview ==
Except for the portion that slopes down to the edge of Lake Shala, the elevation of this Zone ranges from 1700 to 2200 meters above sea level. High points include Mount Bubisa. The climate is characterized as temperate or locally called woinadega, the mean annual temperature is about 17.6 - 22.5 C and the mean annual rainfall falls between 601-1200mm. However, due to a long history of agriculture and population pressure, plant cover is minimal with only a few scattered trees, and the southern end of Halaba has numerous gullies, which have carried off much of the topsoil. Numerous attempts have been made in the last two decades of the 20th century to rehabilitate the land have been unsuccessful. Combined with an erratic rainfall, these factors prevent the inhabitants of this Zone from growing enough food to feed themselves.

The economy is largely based on subsistence agriculture in the form of dryland farming and raising livestock, with some apiculture. The main cash crops include pepper, maize, teff, sorghum, haricot beans and wheat. Halaba has 16 kilometers of asphalt roads, 15 kilometers of all-weather roads and 96 kilometers of dry-weather roads, for an average road density of 130 kilometers per 1000 square kilometers. One micro-finance institution operates in Halaba, the Omo Microfinance Institution SC (OMFI), established in 1997. OMFI, with three branch offices in Durame and a sub-branch in Halaba Kulito, has 945 clients in this woreda.

== History ==
Originally Halaba Zone was a normal woreda of the Kembata, Halaba and Tembaro Zone, but in 2002 it was separated off to become a special woreda.

Halaba endured an extremely heavy hail storm on 27 August 2005, which was accompanied by local flooding. Eleven people were killed by the hailstones while two were drowned in the flooding; several livestock were also killed. Damage included up to 2,555 hectares of crops, and the roofs of many houses.

== Demographics ==
Based on the 2007 Census conducted by the Central Statistical Agency of Ethiopia (CSA), this Zone has a total population of 232,325, of whom 117,291 are men and 115,034 women. With an area of 994.66 square kilometers, Halaba has a population density of 233.57; 26,867 or 11.56% are urban inhabitants. A total of 49,028 households were counted in this Zone, which results in an average of 4.74 persons to a household, and 47,205 housing units. The largest ethnic groups reported in Halaba Zone are the namesake Halaba (79.08%), the Kambaata (7.95%), the Silte (5.19%), the Amhara (3.76%) and the Hadiya (3.6%). Halaba is spoken as a first language by 77.23%, 7.7% speak Kambaata and 5.91% speak Amharic. 90.9% of the population said they are Muslim, 5.02% are Protestant and 3.79% practice Ethiopian Orthodox Christianity.

The 1994 national census reported a total population for this woreda of 187,034 in 23,627 households, of whom 93,194 were men and 93,840 were women; 16,723 or 8.94% of its population were urban dwellers. The five largest ethnic groups reported in Halaba were the Halaba (63.07%), the Silte (23.01%), the Kambaata (6.36%), the Amhara (3.13%) and the Hadiya (1.58%); all other ethnic groups made up 2.85% of the population. Halaba was spoken as a first language by 53.88%, 32.48% spoke Silte, 5.77% Kambaata, 5.13% Amharic, and 1.27% spoke Hadiya; the remaining 1.57% spoke all other primary languages reported. 93.84% of the population said they were Muslim, 4.62% practiced Ethiopian Orthodox Christianity, and 1.2% were Protestants.

== Literature ==
- Abebe Shiferaw; K. Berhe; M. Jaleta; B. Gebremedhin; Hoekstra, Dirk (15 December 2010). "Improving elements of haricot bean value chain in Alaba Special District, Southern Ethiopia: Experiences from IPMS". ILRI. hdl:10568/3028.
