= Laska, Ethiopia =

Town in South Ethiopia

Laska: ላስካ (Amharic)
- Town
- Location within Ethiopia
- Coordinates: 6°18′7″N 36°37′19″E
- Country: Ethiopia
- Region: South Ethiopia Regional State
- Zone: Basketo Zone

Government
  - Mayor: Milkias Doro (Prosperity party)
  - Party Leader: Balem Aguno
- Time zone: UTC+3 (East Africa Time)

Laska (Geʽez: ላስካ) is a town in Basketo Zone, of South Ethiopia Regional State, Ethiopia. The elevation of the town in meter is 1,320. The town is an administrative capital of Laska Zuria woreda and also Basketo Zone. Laska is located at abaut 512 km from the capital city of Ethiopia, Addis Ababa. The town is the home of the Basketo people. Laska has different infrastructures such as pure drinking water, health institutions and electric service.
