= Basketo Zone =

Zone in the South Ethiopia Regional State

Coordinates: 6°15′N 36°35′E

- Zone
- Interactive map of Basketo Zone
- Country: Ethiopia
- Region: South Ethiopia Regional State
- Capital: Laska
- Time zone: UTC+3 (EAT)

Basketo Zone is a zone in the South Ethiopia Regional State of Ethiopia, named after its inhabitants, the Basketo people. It was formerly a part of the Southern Nations, Nationalities and Peoples' Region (SNNPR)'s, and included in to South Ethiopia Regional State in 2023 after a referendum.

Map of the regions and zones of Ethiopia

== Settlements ==
The administrative center of the zone is Laska; other rural administrative centres include Donka, Saattsa, Zabba, Mandit, Obc'a, Bunibas, Gaara etc.

== Geography ==
Basketo is bordered in the south and west by the Debub (South) Omo Zone, and in the north and east by the Gofa Zone. Rivers in this zone include the Berso, Sirso, Sanka, Usino and the Ergino.

== Economy ==
Food crops include enset, sweet potatoes, yams, taro, maize and horse beans, while coffee and the cardamom-like spice Aframomum corrorima are significant cash crops. According to a 2004 report, Basketo had 27 kilometers of all-weather roads and 180 kilometers of dry-weather roads, for an average road density of 1803 kilometers per 1000 square kilometers.

== History ==
Originally Basketo was part of the Semien (North) Omo Zone, and the 1994 national census counted its inhabitants as part of that Zone. However friction between the various ethnic groups in this Zone, which was often blamed on the Welayta for "ethnic chauvinism" and despite the efforts of the ruling party to emphasize the need to co-ordinate, consolidate, and unify the smaller ethnic units to achieve the "efficient use of scarce government resources", eventually led to the division of the Zone in 2000, and reorganizing Basketo as a special woreda.

Basketo was selected by the Ministry of Agriculture and Rural Development in 2004 as one of several woredas for voluntary resettlement for farmers from overpopulated areas, becoming the new home for a total of 7,000 heads of households and 28,000 total family members.

== Demographics ==
Based on the 2007 Census conducted by the Central Statistical Agency of Ethiopia (CSA), this zone has a total population of 56,689, of whom 28,532 men and 28,157 women. With an area of 411.09 square kilometers, Basketo has a population density of 137.90; 5,215 or 9.20% are urban inhabitants. A total of 13,424 households were counted in this woreda, which results in an average of 4.22 persons to a household, and 13,069 housing units. The four largest ethnic groups reported in Basketo were the namesake Basketo people (87.75%), the Wolayta (4.28%), the Amhara (3.73%), and the Konso (1.92%); all other ethnic groups made up 2.32% of the population. Basketo is spoken as a first language by 89.06%, 4.18% Wolaytta, 3.09% Amharic, and 1.92% speak Konso; the remaining 1.75% spoke all other primary languages reported. 64.06% were Protestants, 30.73% of the population said they were Ethiopian Orthodox Christians, 2.13% practiced traditional beliefs, 1.51% embraced Roman Catholicism, and 1.25% were Muslim.

The 1994 national census reported a total population for this zone of 33,672 of whom 16,739 were men and 16,933 were women; 2,191 or 6.51% of its population were urban dwellers. The four largest ethnic groups reported in Basketo were the namesake Basketo people (90.75%), the Amhara (4.04%), the Aari (2.74%), and the Gofa (0.81%); all other ethnic groups made up 1.66% of the population. Basketo is spoken as a first language by 93.2%, 2.94% Amharic, and 2.46% speak Aari; the remaining 1.4% spoke all other primary languages reported.
