= Kambaata people =

Cushitic ethnic group in south-central Ethiopia

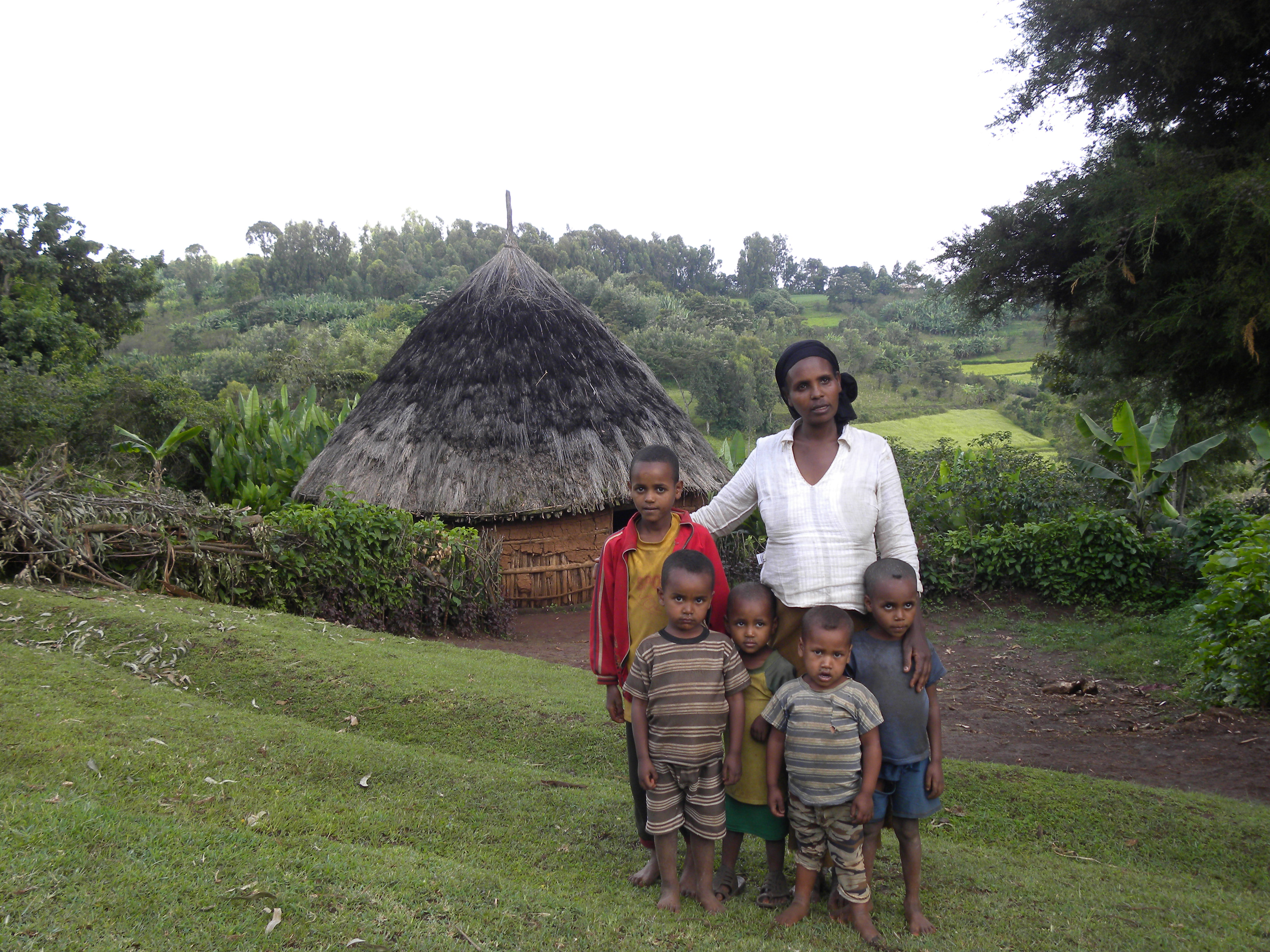
- Kambaata mother with her children in front of their tukul in the Kembata Tembaro Zone, Ethiopia

Total population
- 630,627 (2007)

Regions with significant populations
- Kembata Zone in Central Ethiopia Regional State

Languages
- Kambaata language

Religion
- Ethiopian Orthodox Christianity

Kambaata (Amharic: ከምባታ) is a Cushitic ethnic group in south-central Ethiopia, specifically in Kambaata Zone in Central Ethiopia Regional State. The Kambaata people and Kambaatissa (their language) belongs to the East Highland Cushitic language family. Kambaata was first mentioned in the chronicles of Emperor Yeshaq I. Kambaata was "one of the southern kingdoms with well-established monarchical system...instituted in 16th century and operated without interruption until it ended at the last decade of ninetieth century" when it was incorporated by Emperor Menelik II. During this first period incorporation, Kambaata province was largely Christianized.

== People ==
The Kambata ethnic group is one of the indigenous peoples in Ethiopia. Scientists categorize the Kambata as a highland east Cushitic tribe. In a broader sense, the term Kambata people, is used to describe the various clans and groups of Kambata [Kambata, Alaba, Tambaro]. More specifically, it refers to inhabitants around the heartland of Hambaricho massif. These three autonomous groups speaking dialects of the same language are collectively referred to as the Kambata people. The differences between the various groups of Kambata are not very strict. People are astonishingly mingled, intermarried and spoke one another’s languages. It is, therefore, difficult to specify clear boundaries of these groups

== Demographics ==
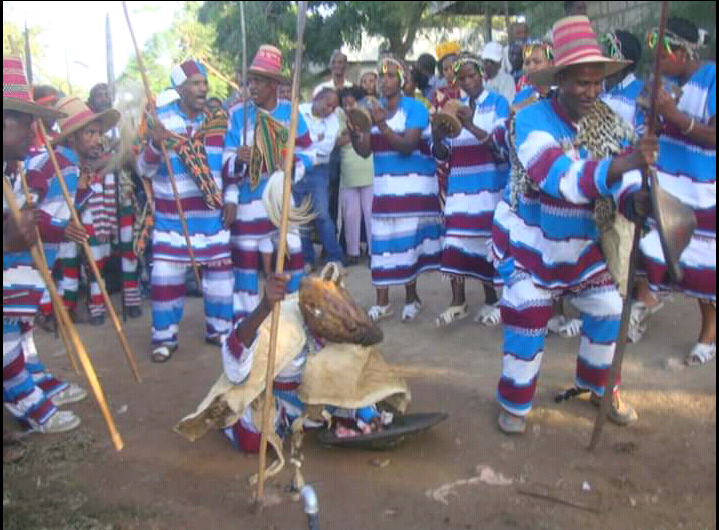
Traditional dressing and dancing of Kambaata culture

According to Ethiopian statistics, the population of the Kambaata people was 630,236, of which 90.89% live in the Southern Nations, Nationalities, and People's Region. Almost one in five – 18.5% – live in urban areas.

The Kambaata people speak the Kambaata language, a Cushitic language.

== History ==
The Kingdom of Kembata was ruled by a long line of its kings known as Woma. King Hamlmal (locally known as Hamo) was the first King of Kambata Kingdom and the founder of the ruling Oyeta clan. King Dagoye, was one of the famous kings known for expanding Kambata territories. The last independent king of Kambaata was King (Woma) Delbato Degoye, who was killed by the armies of Menelik II toward the end 19th Century.

An important landmark for the Kambaata people is the Hambaricho Mountain, which was the residence of the Kambata kings, Woma'The Kambata people used to celebrate Gifata, their annual annual festivals. The king and Abba Sarecho, the god of Kambaata lived there.

== Language ==
Kambata language [self‐name Kambaatissa], [also Kambatigna in Amharic] is one of the working languages of Ethiopia. It is a more known language, spoken by around 4 million speakers. It includes several dialects, such as Tembaaro, Alaba, and Qabeena. It is closely related also to the Hadiyya and Sidama languages, spoken in the neighboring regions. All of these are classified in the group of Highland East Cushitic languages. They are further a part of the Cushitic group of the Afroasiatic language family.

Both the Latin script and Ge'ez script are used for writing. For example, the Bible (full New Testament and part of the Old Testament) has been published in Ge’ez script. The officially established spelling usage [orthography] taught currently in primary schools in the region deviates from the International Phonetic Alphabet convention. For example, in the word Kambaata, the double letters ⟨aa⟩ indicate length.

The language of inter‐ethnic communication is Amharic, the national language of Ethiopia. Kambatas have Amharic names, and some even speak Amharic as their first language. These days, traditional Kambata names are hardly given to children. English is the only spoken foreign language and is the language of teaching in secondary schools.

== Subsistence ==
They have various indigenous traditional cuisines, the most important of which is kocho, which is made from ensete. They also cultivate a variety of tubers, spices, coffee, crops, and vegetables.

Other clans in Kembata province, such as Tembaro, Alaba, and others, live together and form the Kambaata. Tanners Shekla Seriwoch is the most secluded clan in Kembata province; this clan is unable to participate in any socioeconomic activity with Kambaata. Tanners clan and Kambaata people could never marry.

Kambaata is one of the most densely populated regions in Ethiopia. Due to overpopulation and lack of economic opportunities in their region, they migrate to large cities, industrial areas, and large plantation farms. In recent years they experienced a large influx of migration to South Africa and Middle Eastern countries.

== Notable people ==
- Bogaletch Gebre - founder of KMG Ethiopia
- Adane Girma – Ethiopian National Team Football Player
- Lapiso Gedelebo - Ethiopian Historian
- Shimelis Bekele – Ethiopian National Team Football Player
- Loza Abera – Ethiopian National Team Football Player
- Adane Girma -Ethiopia National Team Football player
- Getahun Heramo - Ethiopian chemical engineer, inventor, and entrepreneur known for his work in paint and color technology.
- Belachew Girma - Ethiopia and the world laughter master.
- Gedion Timothewos - Minister of Foreign Affairs of Ethiopia
