= Saja, Ethiopia =

Town in Central Ethiopia

Saja
- Town
- Location within Ethiopia
- Coordinates: 7°58′10″N 37°26′24″E
- Country: Ethiopia
- Region: Central Ethiopia Regional State
- Zone: Yem Zone
- Elevation: 1,942 m (6,371 ft)
- Time zone: UTC+3 (East Africa Time)

Saja is town in central Ethiopia. Saja serves as the administrative seat of Yem Zone and Deri Saja Zuria district of Central Ethiopia Regional State. The town is located at 7° 58′ 10″ N, 37° 26′ 24″ E, and its altitude is 1,942 meters above sea level. Saja is a home of Yem people and located in 239 km southwest from Addis Ababa.

== Infrastructures ==
Saja has infrastructures such as paved roads and electric service, public market services, hotels and restaurant services, pure water services and telecommunication services.
