= 2021 South West Region referendum =

Vote to create region in Ethiopia

Referendum on the creation of a South West region, 2021
- 30 September 2021

Results
Choice	Votes	%
Yes	1,221,092	98.07%
No	24,024	1.93%
Valid votes	1,245,116	98.61%
Invalid or blank votes	17,563	1.39%
Total votes	1,262,679	100.00%
Registered voters/turnout	1,344,622	93.91%

Results
For	98.07%
Against	1.93%

A referendum on the creation of a South West Ethiopia Peoples' Region was held in the Keffa, Sheka, Bench Sheko, Dawro, West Omo Zones, and Konta special district of the Southern Nations, Nationalities, and Peoples' Region (SNNPR) of Ethiopia on 30 September 2021 in conjunction with the 2021 Ethiopian general election. The result was 98% in favor of creating a new region, with turnout of 94%.

It was held two years after the 2019 Sidama Region referendum, making it the second referendum on the creation of a new regional state held in Ethiopia since Abiy Ahmed became prime minister in 2018.

== Results ==
Choice	Votes	%
✓ For	1,221,092	98.07
Against	24,024	1.93
Blank or invalid	17,563	-
Total	1,262,679	100
Voter turnout	1,344,622	93.91
Source: Addis Standard Nebe

== Aftermath ==
On 9 October 2021, the National Election Board of Ethiopia (NEBE) released the results of the referendum. In a turnout of nearly 94%, voters decisively approved the proposed new regional state.

The result meant that South West Ethiopia Peoples' Region became the country's 11th regional state, after it was approved by the House of Federation. It has its own regional council and constitution, enjoying a degree of autonomy enshrined in Ethiopia's constitution.

After being approved on 30 October by the House of Federation, the new South West Ethiopia Peoples' Region was established on 23 November 2021, and Negash Wagesho appointed to lead it.
