= Konso Zone =

Zone in the South Ethiopia Regional State

Coordinates: 5°20′N 37°20′E

Map of the regions and zones of Ethiopia

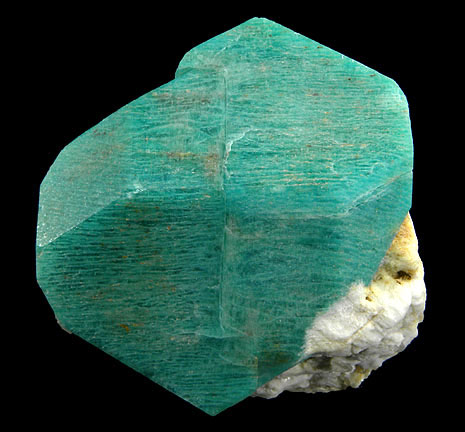
Amazonite mineral specimen from Konso. Size: 4.6 x 4.5 x 4.3 cm.

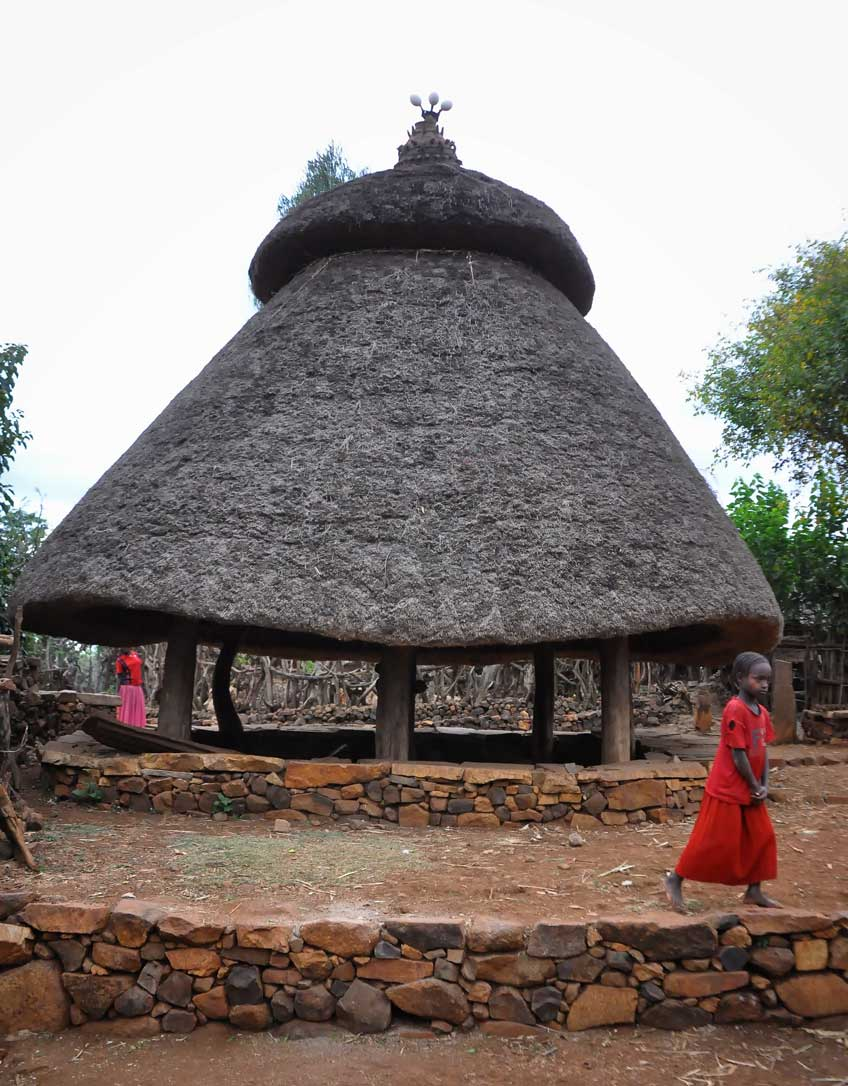
Men and boys' sleeping hut in Konso, Ethiopia

Konso is a zone in the South Ethiopia Regional State, Ethiopia. It was formerly a woreda. Prior to 2011, Konso was not part of any Zone in the Southern Nations, Nationalities and Peoples' Region (SNNPR) and was therefore considered a special woreda, an administrative subdivision which is similar to an autonomous area. In 2011, the Segen Area Peoples Zone was established, which includes Konso special woreda and the 3 former woredas surrounding it. This special woreda is named after the Konso people. Located in the Great Rift Valley, Konso is bordered on the south by the Oromia Region, on the west by the South Omo Zone, on the northwest by Alle special woreda, on the north by Dirashe special woreda, on the northeast by Amaro special woreda, and on the east by Burji special woreda. The Sagan River, which flows south then west to join the Weito, defines part of the woreda's boundary with Burji and the entire length of the boundary with the Oromia Region. The administrative center is Karati; other towns in Konso include Fasha and Sagen. After protesting by residents to become a zone for several years, Konso became a zone in November 2018.

== Overview ==
Rivers in this woreda include the Talpeena, a tributary of the Sagan. A 1996 United Nations Development Programme Emergencies Unit for Ethiopia report divided the area of this special woreda "by differences of altitude and economic exploitation", which are the "semi-arid lowland areas supporting the majority of the population (between 60-70 percent); and agricultural uplands in the middle altitude supporting the rest of the primarily cultivating population." The native Konso traditionally practice a distinct and sustainable form of agriculture that involves the building and maintaining of stone terraces, and fertilizing the fields with manure. A central feature of their fields is the endemic tree crop, Moringa stenopetala. The main crop is sorghum, along with some root crops and cotton.

According to a 2004 report, Konso had 178 kilometers of all-weather roads and 81 kilometers of dry-weather roads, for an average road density of 114 kilometers per 1000 square kilometers. The Central Statistical Agency (CSA) reported that five tons of coffee were produced in this woreda in the year ending in 2005, based on inspection records from the Ethiopian Coffee and Tea authority. This represented less than 0.1% of the SNNPR's output and less than 0.1% of Ethiopia's total output.

== History ==
The Konso area, formerly a woreda, has had a number of boundary disputes with adjacent administrative units. According to Sarah Vaughan, the "most serious of these concerns Teltele district, claimed since 1992 by [the] Borana zone of Oromia" which has been ongoing since 1992. Another dispute was over Gato and Bayde Fuchucha kebeles with Derashe special woreda administrations, with a further claim for Ale, which after mediation between the two woredas was referred to the SNNPR parliament for action.

The 1996 UNDP-EUE report quotes an earlier report prepared in 1993, which had stated that "one peculiarity of the Konso area is its frequent earthquakes. A recent strong tremor sent panic around the villages. Some hillside villages (one nicknamed New York) have slid as a result. Another danger is fire, in the crowded, stockaded villages full of wooden structures." The 1996 report however concludes, "No earthquakes occurred after 1993."

Local government officials in Konso denied elected officials of the opposition Konso People's Democratic Union (KPDU) the offices to which they had been elected in 2001 for several months. Over the next few years, the KPDU was subjected to a campaign of harassment. After opening a branch office in Fasha on 29 December 2002, pro-government supporters severely beat several KPDU members and seriously damaged the newly opened office; the landlord who rented the office space to the KPDU was reportedly arrested. In July of the following year, ruling party supporters, backed by local militia, closed the KPDU branch office in Karati and imprisoned party leaders Tesfaye Korra and Adane Fulayta for one week. Activists of the ruling party then looted the offices and damaged the roof. Then on 12 October, government militias acting on the authority of local officials arrested the chairman of the KPDU, Shako Otto Kora, in Karati and detained him for six days. The local officials accused him of "disturbing development activities" for visiting one of his party's branch offices that had been closed.

The Sudan Times reported that on 14 May 2008 continuing conflict between the Konso and Borena Oromo left 36 people dead and forced more than 5,000 inhabitants to flee their homes. "Among the dead, 35 of them belong to Konso tribes" Areke Geyto, the administrator of the special woreda told local reporters. The refugees were sheltered in the Aba-Roba, Kashale, Nalaya Segen and Gesergo kebeles.

=== Zone status ===
In 2014, Konso residents were unhappy with being part of the Segen Area People's Zone, complaining about unfair budget and job allocation and other local administration and justice issues and called for creating Konso Zone. A petition with two thousand signature was submitted to the regional council and higher authorities. It was rejected. In November 2018, after Abiy Ahmed became prime minister of Ethiopia, the SNNPRS Council made Konso into a zone.

== Demographics ==
Based on the 2007 Census conducted by the Central Statistical Agency of Ethiopia (CSA), this woreda has a total population of 235,087, of whom 113,412 are men and 121,675 women. With an area of 2,273.79 square kilometers, Konso has a population density of 103.39; 9,415 or 4.00% are urban inhabitant. A total of 44,902 households were counted in this woreda, which results in an average of 5.24 persons to a household, and 43,535 housing units. The two largest ethnic groups reported in Konso were the Konso (87.04%), and the Gawwada (9.79%); all other ethnic groups made up 3.17% of the population. Konso was spoken as a first language by 86.18% of the inhabitants, 9.73% spoke Gawwada, 2.08% spoke Oromiffa, and 1.26% spoke Amharic; the remaining 0.75% spoke all other primary languages reported. 50.34% were Protestants, 34.62% of the population said they practiced traditional religions, and 13.81% practiced Ethiopian Orthodox Christianity.

In the 1994 Census this woreda had a population of 157,585 in 29,629 households, of whom 77,147 were men and 80,438 women; 5,479 or 3.48% of its population were urban dwellers. The four largest ethnic groups reported in Konso were the Konso (87.01%), the Gawwada (9.2%), the Amhara (1.25%), and the Oromo (0.75%); all other ethnic groups made up 1.79% of the population. Konso was spoken as a first language by 86.64% of the inhabitants, 9.11% spoke Gawwada, 2.26% spoke Oromiffa, and 1.4% spoke Amharic; the remaining 0.59% spoke all other primary languages reported. 65.62% of the population said they practiced traditional religions, 24.47% were Protestants, and 5.49% practiced Ethiopian Orthodox Christianity. Concerning education, 8.14% of the population were considered literate; 3.79% of children aged 7–12 were in primary school; 1.45% of the children aged 13–14 were in junior secondary school, and 0.94% of the inhabitants aged 15–18 were in senior secondary school. Concerning sanitary conditions, about 89% of the urban houses and 11% of all houses had access to safe drinking water at the time of the census; 55% of the urban and 7% of the total had toilet facilities.
