= Kolango =

Town in South Ethiopia

Kolango: ኮላንጎ (Amharic)
- Town
- Location within Ethiopia
- Coordinates: 5°48′N 37°21′E
- Country: Ethiopia
- Region: South Ethiopia Regional State
- Zone: Ale Zone
- Time zone: UTC+3 (East Africa Time)

Kolango is a town in Ale Zone, of South Ethiopia Regional State, Ethiopia. The town is an administrative capital of Kolango Zuria district and also Ale Zone. Kolango is located at about 670 km south from the capital city of Ethiopia, Addis Ababa. The town is the home of the Ale people. Kolango includes infrastructures such as pure drinking water, health institutions and electric service.
