= Soyama =

Town in Burji Zone, Ethiopia

Soyama is a town in southern Ethiopia, and is the administrative center of the Burji special woreda. Located in the Southern Nations, Nationalities, and Peoples Region, this town has a latitude and longitude of 05°42′N 37°53′E with an elevation of 1660 meters above sea level. According to information on the Nordic Africa Institute website, Soyama appears to be named after a nearby range of mountains northeast of the town and to the southwest of Lake Chamo.

Based on figures from the Central Statistical Agency in 2005, Soyama has an estimated total population of 8,052 of whom 4,134 were males and 3,918 were females. The 1994 national census reported this town had a total population of 4,445 of whom 2,289 were males and 2,156 were females.
