= Welkite =

Town in Central Ethiopia Regional State, Ethiopia

Welkite ወልቂጤ
- Town
- Location within Ethiopia
- Coordinates: 8°17′N 37°47′E
- Country: Ethiopia
- Region: Central Ethiopia Regional State
- Zone: Gurage
- Elevation: 1,910 m (6,270 ft)

Population (2007)
  - Total: 28,866
- Time zone: UTC+3 (EAT)

Welkite (also transliterated Wolkite; Amharic: ወልቂጤ) is a town and separate woreda in south-western Ethiopia. The second administrative center of the Central Ethiopia Regional State, and Gurage Zone . The town has a latitude and longitude of 8°17′N 37°47′E and an elevation between 1910 and 1935 meters above sea level. According to the government, Welkite is one of 12 towns with electrical power, one of 11 with telephone service and one of nine that have postal service. The SNNPR's Bureau of Finance and Economic Development, adds that as of 2003 Welkite also had a bank branch and other financial institutions, as well as a hospital. An all-weather road was built in 1963 which connects Welkite to Addis Ababa by way of Endibir.

== Overview ==
At Welkite an extreme example of an attempt at eviction of tenants before the Ethiopian revolution is reported to have occurred. A retired colonel living in the area held title to 4,000 hectares, which some 500 tenants cultivated. Following a fertilizer demonstration by the United Nations' Food and Agriculture Organization in 1969, the colonel decided to introduce modernized farming. At first he decided to modernize rapidly and announced that he was going to terminate the tenancy relationships with all of his tenants. The tenants, however, are said to have responded violently, attempting to stone their landlord one night as he left a bar in Welkite. The colonel then changed tactics, modernizing his lands piecemeal and evicting smaller numbers of tenants. By 1972, he had 160 hectares under tractor cultivation, and 140 tenant families were said to have been evicted. These people did not, however, leave the area, relying on the ensete cultivations around their houses for a minimum of food.

The town has well over 150 years of ages. It expanded along the Addis-Jimma highway and has been sprawling over the crescent shaped plateau.

== Demographics ==
Based on the 2007 Census conducted by the Central Statistical Agency, this town has a total population of 28,866, of whom 15,074 are men and 13,792 women. The plurality of the inhabitants practiced Ethiopian Orthodox Christianity with 48.17% of the population reporting that belief, while 42.31% were Muslim, 7.86% were Protestants, and 1.34% were Catholic.

The 1994 national census reported this town had a total population of 15,329 of whom 7,580 were men and 7,749 were women. In the villages around Welkite there are believed to be about 1,000 speakers of Gumuz language, who are a Nilo-Saharan people whose homeland straddles between Ethiopia and Sudan.
