= Alaba-Kʼabeena language =

Highland East Cushitic language of East Africa

Alaba-Kʼabeena
- Native to: Ethiopia
- Region: Rift Valley southwest of Lake Shala
- Native speakers: 280,000 (2007 census)
- Language family: Afro-Asiatic: Cushitic; Highland East; Kambaata; Alaba-Kʼabeena
- Writing system: Geʽez script

Language codes
- ISO 639-3: alw
- Glottolog: alab1254

Alaba-Kʼabeena (Alaaba, Alaba, Allaaba, Halaba), also known as Wanbasana, is a Highland East Cushitic language spoken in Ethiopia by the Halaba and Kebena people in the Great Rift Valley southwest of Lake Shala, specifically in the Alaba special district, the Kebena district of Gurage Zone, and the Goro district of the Oromia Region. The literacy rate of native speakers in their language is below 1%, while their literacy rate in second languages is 8.6%; Alaba-Kʼabeena is taught in primary schools. It has an 81% lexical similarity with Kambaata. However, Fleming (1976) classifies Kʼabeena (also transliterated "Qebena" or "Kebena") as a dialect of Kambaata, and Blench (2006) classifies both as dialects of Kambaata. The 2007 census in Ethiopia lists Alaba and Qebena as separate languages.

A collection of over 400 proverbs in this language has been published with English translations.

The Alaba speakers consists of 23 different groups.

The Alaba Groups
Siidee	Kolminee	T'orumboraa	Ajjaa
Sofaatoo	Toogoo	Genzaa	Korjoo
Wusharminee	Azoobaddaa	Torodaa	Guzubee
K'ujjee	Zeebaddaa	Dariimoo	Kuuk'ee
Kanassaa	Galminee	Gumbee	Anashakoo
Wushiiraa	Melgaa	Shadgeraa	

The number of speakers of this language has increased. In 2001 there were 204,000 speakers and in 2007 approximately 280,000 speakers.

== Phonology ==
=== Vowel Inventory ===
Alaba has ten vowels, which contrast in height and backness as well as in length.

Vowels
	front	back
high	ɪ ⟨i⟩ iː ⟨ii⟩	ʊ ⟨u⟩ uː ⟨uu⟩
mid-low	ɛ ⟨e⟩ ɛː ⟨ee⟩	ɔ ⟨o⟩ ɔː ⟨oo⟩
low	a ⟨a⟩ aː ⟨aa⟩	

=== Consonants ===
Consonants
		labial	dental/ alveolar	post-alveolar/ palatal	velar	glottal
plosive/ affricate	voiceless	(p)	t	tʃ	k	ʔ
plosive/ affricate	voiced	b	d	dʒ	g	
plosive/ affricate	ejective	pʼ	tʼ	tʃʼ	kʼ	
fricative	voiceless	f	s	ʃ		h
fricative	voiced		z	ʒ		
sonorant	nasal	m	n	ɲ		
sonorant	liquid		ɾ/r			
sonorant	liquid		l			
sonorant	glide	(ɰ)		j	ɰ	

=== Geminates ===
In linguistics, the term refers to the duplication of sounds or words as well as the associated linguistic phenomena, such as a longer pronunciation.

This denotes a doubled of sounds in the pronunciation of the word. Almost all consonants have a geminated counterpart. This means, in terms of stops, that the release is being delayed while other consonants are being extended. Similarities to the Shaddah and its function in Arabic are visible.

Geminates in Alaba are often used to indicate the plural form.

Examples of Gemenation in Alaba - Plural Forms
Alaba	Translation	Alaba	Translation
zazzát(a)	scythe	zazzarrát(a)	scythes
sumudát(a)	sign	sumuddát(a)	signs
wot'át(a)	ghost	wott'át(a)	ghosts
gomát(a)	cloud	gommát(a)	clouds

=== Syllabic Structure ===
Syllables in Alaba consist of a consonant or one or two vowels. There are several syllables in Alaba, for example light, heavy and extra heavy.

Alaba - Syllable Structure
Alaba	Translation	onset	peak	coda	Comment
ʔa-li	body	C	V		light syllable
ʔa-fóo	mouth	C	VV		heavily syllable, open
gen-na-nú	shoulder	C	V	C	heavy syllable, closed
huun-kí	sweat	C	VV	C	extra heavy syllable

== Grammar ==
=== Gender ===
In Alaba grammatical gender is indicated by word-final vowels for masculine and feminine words. "Apart from cases of biological sex, there is no semantic motivation for gender."

Masculine Nouns
Alaba	Translation
ʔanná	father
ʔanjá	saliva
c'ullí	son, boy, child
mulí	kidney

"Feminine nouns, as they appear in citation form end almost exclusively in -t(a)."

Feminine Nouns
Alaba	Translation
ʔamát(a)	mother
laagát(a)	voice
ʔillít(a)	eye
ʔashó	ant

=== Cases ===
Alaba differentiates between several different types of cases. There are primary and secondary cases. Absolutive and Nominative are the primary cases and will therefore be mentioned first. The Absolutive can be further subdivided into six more cases, i.e. Instrumental, Similative Genitive, Dative, Ablative and Locative.

==== Absolutive ====
The Absolutive is used in different syntactic environments: as the citation form of nouns, to encode the direct object, as the nominal predicate, marginally to indicate a location with non-motional verbs and to indicate a certain point of time.

The Absolutive is used to encode the direct object:

t’uma min-í hirʔ-éem(i)
good house {buy (1SG)}
I bought a nice house.

==== Nominative ====
The Nominative is used to encode the subject of an intransitive, as well as the subject of a transitive sentence.

==== Genetive ====
The Genetive in Alaba is mainly used to indicate a possessive relationship by using a suffix marker as it can be seen below in the table.

Genetive - Possessive Relationship
Alaba	Translation	Possessor	Possessed
c'uuli kitaabi	The boy's book	masculine	masculine
c'uule kitaabi	The girl's book	feminine	masculine
c'uuli buʔlá	The boy's head	masculine	masculine
c'uule buʔlá	The girl's head	feminine	masculine
c'uuli hak'éeta(a)	The boy's dream	masculine	feminine
c'uule hak'éet(a)	The girl's dream	feminine	feminine
c'uuli lokkát(a)	The boy's leg	masculine	feminine
c'uule lokkát(a)	The girl's leg	feminine	feminine

So, the suffix marker attaches to the possessor, independent from the gender of the possessed.

In terms of phonetics it is important to mention that "the final vowel for masculine words ending in a short vowel is i, for those ending in a long vowel it is ee." And regarding feminine nouns; "they drop -t(a), and end in e. (...) The last vowel of those nouns ending in é or ó does not change but they do lose the high pitch. If the corresponding vowel is a, long ee or aa, the Genitive ending is also a, ee or aa."

==== Dative ====
The form of the Dative in Alaba is based on morphological features that were shown in the Genetive above. The final vowel is lengthened, if not yet done, and gets a high pitch.

Again, there is difference between female and male nouns. Regarding male nouns there are two possibilities. "Either -h(a) is suffixed or it is not; when choosing, e.g. between mancíi and mancíih(a)," The second version [mancíih(a)] refers to a specific man/person.

Feminine nouns suffix -t(a) without exception.

Names like Muhammad, only the last vowel is lengthened, which leads to Muhammadii but NOT Muhammadiih(a). Therefore, -h(a) is never suffixed.

One example for more clarity:

mánc(u) kitaab-í mancóot(a) ʔaassée
mánc(u) kitaab-í mancóot(a) ʔaaʔʔ-is-ée
{person (NOM)} book {person (DAT)} {take from (CAUS)}
The man gave the book to the woman.

And the other way around:

mancút(i) mancíih(a) kitaab-í ʔaattóo
{person (NOM)} {person (DAT)} book {give (SG)}
The woman gave the book to the man.

=== Pronouns ===
The table below shows the pronouns and pronominal clitics (PC) related to their grammatical cases.

			Absolutive		Nominative	Genitive		Genitive		Ablative	Instrumental	Similative
			Pronoun	PC	Nominative	Pronoun	PC	Pronoun	PC	Ablative	Instrumental	Similative
1st person	singular		ʔisá	-(ʔ)e	an(i)	ʔii	-(ʔ)e	ʔesáa/ ʔisáa	-(ʔ)e	ʔicc(i)	ʔíin(i)	ʔíg(a)
1st person	plural		nesa	-(n)ne	ʔnáʔ(u)	nii	-(n)ne	nesáa	-(n)ne	níicc(i)	níin(i)	nig(a)
2nd person	singular		kesa	-he/ -ke	at(i)	kii	-ki	kesáa	-he/-ke	kíicc(i)	kíin(i)	kig(a)
2nd person	plural		kiʔnet(a)	-hiʔne/ -kiʔne	ʔáʔn(u)	kiʔne	kiʔne	kiʔnée	-hiʔne/ -kiʔne	kiʔnéecc(i)	kiʔnéen(i)	kiʔneg(a)
3rd person	singular	fem.	ʔiset(a)	-se	ʔíse(e)	ʔise	-se	ʔisée	-se	ʔiséecc(i)	ʔséen(i)	ʔiseg(a)
3rd person	singular	masc.	ʔisú	-si	ʔis(i)	ʔisi	-si	ʔisíih(a)/ ʔisíi	-si	ʔisíicc(i)	ʔisíin(i)	ʔisig(a)
3rd person	plural		ʔissat(a)	-(s)sa	ʔíss(a)	ʔissa	-(s)sa	ʔissáa	-(s)sa	ʔissáacc(i)	ʔssáan(i)	ʔsság(a)

=== Negation ===
The most common negative marker is -baʔ(a). If the whole clause is negated, the clitical element is attached to the main verb.

Muslím-mat(i) ʔasaam-á ʔit-táa-baʔ(a)
PL pig/pork {eat not}
Muslims do not eat pork.
