= Butajira =

Town in central Ethiopia

Butajira ቡታጅራ
- Town
- Location within Ethiopia
- Coordinates: 8°7′15″N 38°22′45″E
- Country: Ethiopia
- Region: Central Ethiopia Regional State
- Zone: East Gurage
- Elevation: 2,131 m (6,991 ft)

Population (2007)
  - Total: 33,406
- Time zone: UTC+3 (EAT)
- Climate: Cwb

Butajira (Amharic: ቡታጅራ) is a town and separate woreda in central Ethiopia. Located at the base of the Zebidar massif in the East Gurage Zone of the Central Ethiopia Regional State, Butajira has an elevation of 2131 meters above sea level.

== Overview ==
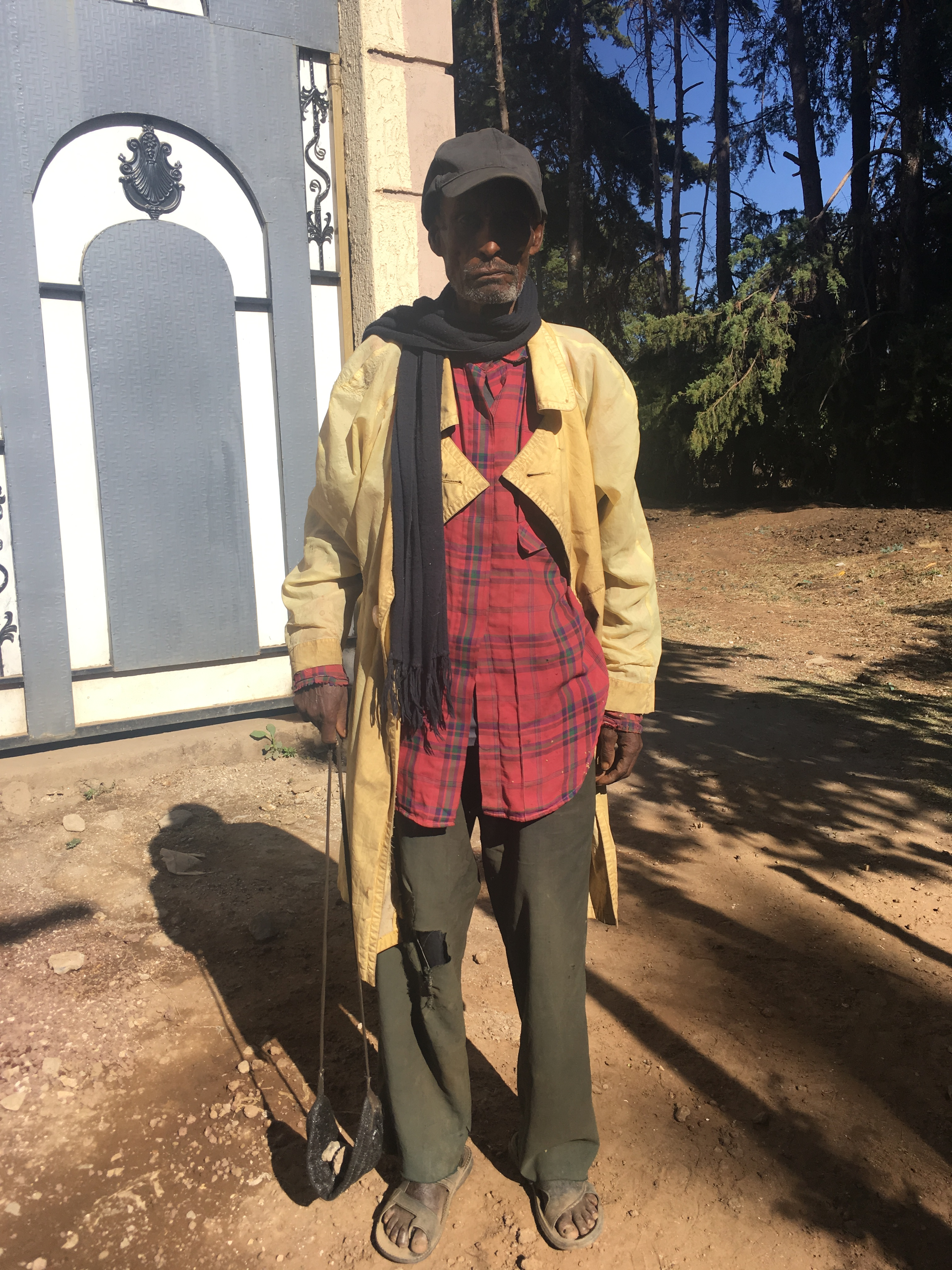
Gurage man with a slingshot in Butajira.

Butajira was founded between 1926 when a missionary Pere Azaiz found nothing there, and 1935 when a German ethnographic expedition found a town laid out in "straight lines and square shapes" with a Fitawrari as governor of the area. After Ras Desta Damtew was taken prisoner on 24 February 1937 in the small village of Eya he was brought to Butajira where, after a perfunctory trial, he was executed that evening. British patrols, acting as part of the East African Campaign, found that arbegnoch groups had dispersed the local Italian positions, leading to both the British and Ethiopian flags being raised over the town on 21 April 1941.

According to the Gurage Zone government, as of 2007 Butajira is one of 12 towns with electrical power, one of 11 with telephone service, and one of nine that have postal service in the Gurage Zone. drinkable water is provided by 4 boreholes. The town has a weekly market on Fridays. Notable landmarks in the town include a fountain on the south side of the town, which is fed from a sacred spring dedicated to saint Tekle Haymanot. The zone authorities mention another local landmark is the local mosque (constructed by the financial contributions of both Muslims and Christians), which was completed in 1979 (1972 EC), and has two large praying halls, each with room for 2500 individuals: the hall on the ground floor is for women while the hall on the second floor is for men.

Roughly 10 kilometers from Butajira is Butajira Crater Lake, which was created by phreatic eruptions.

== Demographics ==
Based on the 2007 Census conducted by the CSA, this town has a total population of 33,406, of whom 16,923 are men and 16,483 women. The majority of the inhabitants were reported as Muslim, with 51.27% of the population reporting that belief, while 39.58% practice Ethiopian Orthodox Christianity, and 8.72% were Protestants. The 1994 national census reported this town had a total population of 20,509 of whom 9,827 were men and 10,682 were women. As of 2011, the total fertility rate was estimated to be 5.3 children per woman, and the total marital fertility rate was estimated to be 7.8 children per married woman.

== Health ==
A 2021 study revealed high rates of under-immunization in young children, with just 22.4% of children aged 12 to 23 months being fully immunized.

As of 2010, Butajira has relatively low prevalence of malaria, with less than 1% overall prevalence. Prevalence varies among villages in the area and tends to be lower with higher altitudes.
