= Central Ethiopia Regional State =

Regional state in Ethiopia

Central Ethiopia Regional State: ማዕከላዊ ኢትዮጵያ ክልላዊ መንግስት (Amharic)
- Regional state
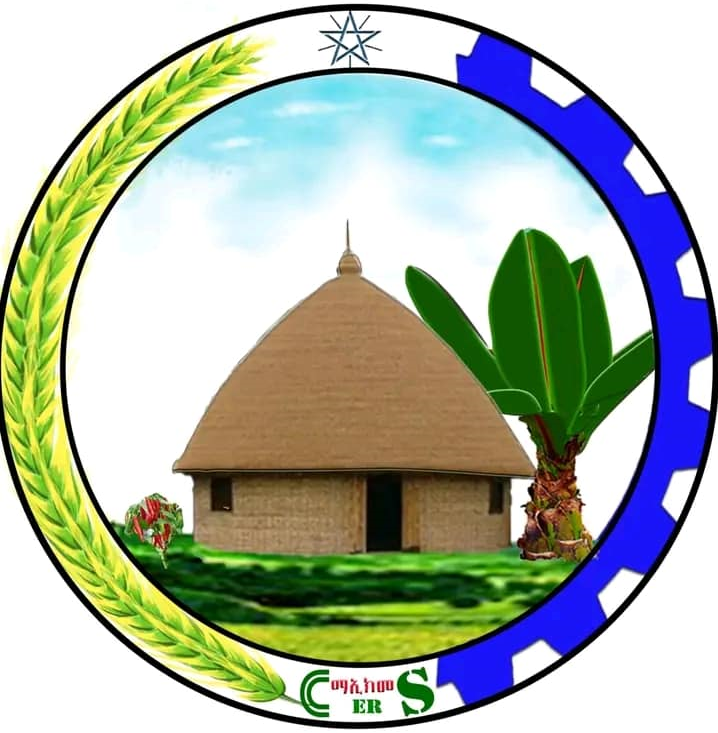
- Flag Seal

- Map of Ethiopia showing the Central Ethiopia Regional State
- Coordinates: 7°4′0″N 38°0′0″E
- Country: Ethiopia
- Established: 19 August 2023
- Capital: Hosaena

Government
  - Chief Administrator: Yetimgeta Asrat (Dr.)

Area
  - Total: 15,098.97 km^{2} (5,829.74 sq mi)

Population (2025)
  - Total: 9,521,000
  - Rank: 3rd
  - Density: 630.6/km^{2} (1,633/sq mi)
- Website: Central Ethiopia Regional Government Communication Affairs bureau

The Central Ethiopia Regional State is a regional state in Ethiopia. It was formed from northern part of the then Southern Nations, Nationalities, and Peoples' Region (SNNPR) on 19 August 2023. Its formation was effected when South Ethiopia Regional State was established after a successful referendum from the former SNNPR. The largest ethnic groups in the region are the Gurage and Hadiya, constituting 70 percent of the region's population, and both the inaugural president and the current president hails from the Gurage people.

Hosaina is the seat to the executive branch of government, whereas Welkite is the seat to the legislative branch of government (the regional parliament). Other regional bureaus were established in Butajira, Durame, Halaba Kulito, Saja and Worabe.

== Chief administrator ==
List of chief administrators of the Central Ethiopia Regional State
Number	Incumbent	Tenure	Portrait	Affiliation	Notes
1	Endashaw Tassew	19 August 2023 - 03 October 2026		Prosperity Party	
2	Yetimgeta Asrat (Dr.)	03 October 2026 - present		Prosperity Party	

== Administrative divisions ==
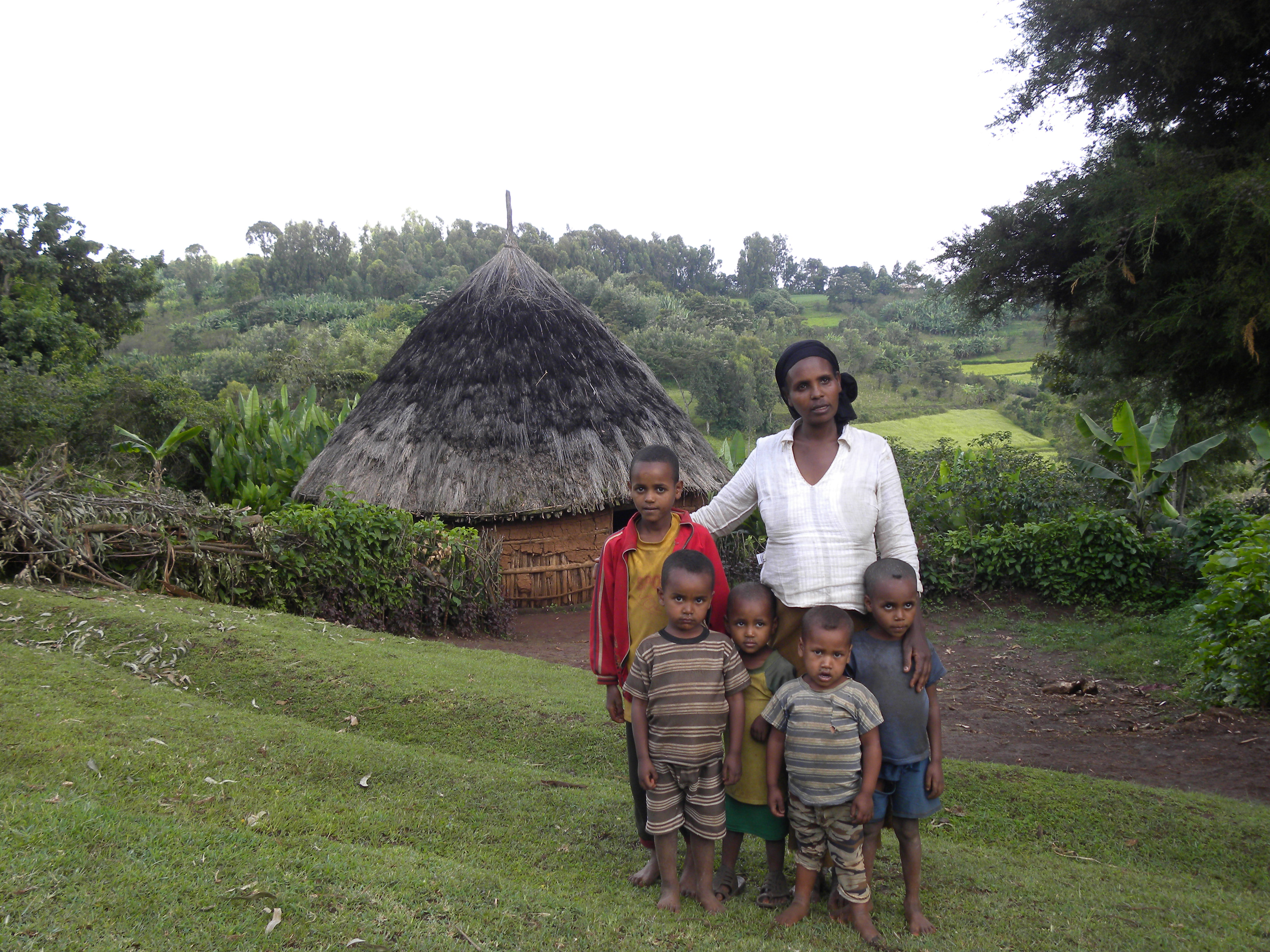
Kambaata family in front of their tukul in the Kembata Zone

The following list shows founding and newly established Zones and Special Woreda in Central Ethiopia Regional State.

Zones and Special woreda in the Central Ethiopia Regional State
No.	Zone/Special Woreda	Seat
1	East Gurage Zone	Butajira
2	Gurage Zone	Welkite
3	Hadiya Zone	Hosaena
4	Halaba Zone	Halaba Kulito
5	Kembata Zone	Durame
6	Siltʼe Zone	Worabe
7	Yem Zone	Saja
8	Kebena Special Woreda	Wolkite
9	Mareko Special Woreda	Koshe
10	Tembaro Special Woreda	Mudula
