= Hambaricho Mountain =

Mountain in Ethiopia

Hambaricho, (Amharic ሐምባርቾ), at an elevation of 3058 meters above sea level, is one of the highest mountains in southern Ethiopia. It is located in the Central Ethiopian Regional State in Kambata (Amharic ከምባታ) Zone. Durame, the capital city of Kambata Zone, is located at the foothills of the Hambaricho Mountain. The mountain has a lot of historical, cultural, and spiritual significance to the local Kambata community. It is believed that the first seven tribes of the Kambata lived on Mount Hambaricho from ancient times, and the Kambatas still refer to these groups as "Hambaricho Lamala" (ሀምበሪቾ ላማላ) (the seven kin-groups of Kambata) as the original/founding groups of the Kambata. As can be learned from historical sources based on oral traditions, people radiated from this historical center of Mount Hambaricho and began to settle around the mountain.

The Hambaricho Mountain and its ranges served as the administrative center and seat for successive Kambata kings from 16th century until the last decade of 19th century when the last Kambata Woma (king), Woma Dilbato Degoye, and his advisors were captured and executed during the invasion and military occupation of Kambata by the armies of Menelik II from 1890 to 1893. The conquest ended the Kambata monarchy. The rule of the Woma was replaced by the rule of the Balabat, the local nobility until it lost importance after the Ethiopian civil war.However, Hambaricho continued to serve as acenter for the Kambata people. After the conquest of Kambata Dejazmatch Bashah Aboye was "believed to have relocated his garrison" headquarters to Hambaricho. Tessema Darge, who led the conquest against Kambatta, had "lived at Hambaricho garrison and then relocated it into a new garrison in Angacha, Kambata."

The Kambata people (ከምባቲ ምናደቡ) used to gather in Hambaricho annually to celebrate the Masala festival with gifata (patriotic and war songs) and shalla (cultural songs and dances) in the presence of the revered Abba Serecho (አባ ሰሬቾ), who was generally believed to have possessed immense Spiritual gift, spiritual power. Today, one can get a panoramic view of Hambaricho from Durame, an administrative center of Kambata Zone, and from other places in the Zone. The Kambata Zone administration has built 777 staircases that crisscross the mountain from the bottom to the summit which made the Hambaricho Mountain easily accessible for local and international visitors & tourists. The Hambaricho 777 Eco Tourism project was managed by Kambata engineers from the project from site survey and design to construction and completion of the stairs, demonstrating a great engineering performance. In the words of the Regional Centre for Mapping of Resources for Development (RCMRD) expert, Degalo Sendabo, the newly inaugurated Hambaricho Mountain staircase is "one of the best viewpoints to see the Great Rift Valley of Eastern Africa." The 777 stairs project, coupled with other ongoing Hambaricho Tourism and Green Development Projects (HT GDP), is part and parcel of making "the historical center of Kambata people" one of the tourist destination centers in Southern Ethiopia. In 2025 Kambata Zone built over 700 new staircases which increased the total staircases of the Hambaricho Mountain to over 1,500 staircases.
