= 2019 Sidama Region referendum =

Secessionist referendum in Ethiopia

Referendum on the creation of a Sidama region, 2019
- 20 November 2019

Results
| Choice | Votes | % |
|---|---|---|
| Yes | 2,225,249 | 98.52% |
| No | 33,463 | 1.48% |
| Valid votes | 2,258,712 | 99.19% |
| Invalid or blank votes | 18,351 | 0.81% |
| Total votes | 2,277,063 | 100.00% |
| Registered voters/turnout | 2,280,147 | 99.86% |

Results
| For | 98.52% |
| Against | 1.48% |

A referendum on creating a Sidama Region was held on regionalisation in the Sidama Zone of Ethiopia on 20 November 2019. The creation of such a region is a long-standing claim of the Sidama people.

The referendum's management and its likely centrifugal consequences on Ethiopia's system of ethnic federalism were seen as a crucial test for Prime Minister Abiy Ahmed's policy of democratic openness ahead of the 2020 general election.

== Results ==
| Choice | Votes | % |
|---|---|---|
| ✓ For | 2,225,249 | 98.52 |
| Against | 33,463 | 1.48 |
| Blank and invalid votes | 18,351 | – |
| Total | 2,277,063 | 100 |
| Voter turnout | 2,280,147 | 99.86 |
Source: Addis Standard

The choices on the ballot paper were for the Sidama people to be organized within their regional state, which was represented by the election symbol of “Shafeta” (traditional Sidama food vessel), and for Sidama to stay in the Southern Nations, Nationalities, and Peoples' Region (SNNPR), represented by the “Gojo” (traditional Sidama hut) symbol. The latter choice got a tiny percentage of votes, an expected result given the popularity of the decades-long statehood quest among the Sidama and the lackluster campaigning by the SNNPR.

== Aftermath ==
The result meant that Sidama would become Ethiopia's 10th regional state, with its own regional constitution and regional council, and would enjoy a degree of sovereignty enshrined in Ethiopia's multinational constitution.

The Sidama regional state is Ethiopia's 10th regional state in Ethiopia. It borders the Guji Zone, the West Arsi Zone of the Oromia Region, the Wolayita Zone, and the Gedeo Zone of the SNNPR.

The question of what to do about the city of Awasa in the Sidama Zone, also the capital city of the SNNPR but outside of the region when the Sidama state was officially declared, was a sticking point for some time. However, it was addressed when the regional council decided that the SNNPR government would stay in Awasa for two consecutive election terms, during which it would facilitate its future capital city.

The Sidama Region officially began on 18 June 2020, seven months after the referendum.

The successful referendum also gave hope to other ethnicities belonging to the SNNPR who wanted their own regional state as the Sidama region did, leading to the 2021 South West Region referendum.
