= Ale Zone =

Zone in the South Ethiopia Regional State

- Zone
- Location in Ethiopia
- Coordinates: 5°35′N 37°11′E
- Country: Ethiopia
- Region: South Ethiopia Regional State
- Capital: Kolango
- Time zone: UTC+3 (EAT)

Map of the regions and zones of Ethiopia

Ale or Alle is an administrative zone in South Ethiopia Regional State. In 2011 Ale was included in the Segen Area People's Zone. Ale demanded their own district for decades and secured woreda status in 2011. Before 2011, the Ale were a minority in the then Konso and Dirashe Special Woredas. Ale got Zonal status upon inauguration day of South Ethiopia Regional State in August 2023. The zone is named for the Ale people, whose homeland is in the zone. Ale is bordered on the North by Gamo Zone, on the East by the Gardula Zone, West by the South Omo Zone and South by the Konso Zone. The administrative centre of Ale Zone is Kolango.

== Administrative division ==
Currently, Ale Zone has one woreda and a city administration. These are Kolango Zuria Woreda and Kolango city administration.
