= Basketo people =

The Basketo people are an Omotic-speaking ethnic group whose homeland lies in the northwestern part of the South Ethiopia Regional State (SERS) of Ethiopia. The Basketo Zone is named after this ethnic group. According to the 2007 Ethiopian national census, this ethnic group has 78,284 members, of whom 99.3% live in the SNNPR.

The Basketo cultivate ensete and, additionally, tuber roots, maize, millet and vegetables. They also keep domestic animals in small numbers.

Traditionally, the Basketo were organized as a segmentary clan society headed by a divine king, the kati. The ethnic religion of the Basketo knew a duality of the sky-god Tsosii and the earth-mother Qacharunde. When they were united with the other ethnic groups by King Menelik II in 1893 many of them converted to Ethiopian Orthodox Christianity.

The Basketo were conquered for the Ethiopian empire by Ras Welde Giyorgis in 1893.

== See also ==
- Basketo language

== Sources ==
- Azeb Amha and Dirk Bustorf: "Basketo". In: Encyclopaedia Aethiopica. vol. 1. Wiesbaden 2003. pp. 499f.
- Eike Haberland: "Die Basketto und verwandte Stämme". In: Altvölker Süd-Äthiopiens. Stuttgart 1959. pp. 189–226.
