= Yem Zone =

Zone in Central Ethiopia Regional State

Coordinates: 7°50′N 37°30′E

Map of the regions and zones of Ethiopia

Yem Zone is one of the zones in the Central Ethiopia Regional State. Yem is named for the Yem, people whose homeland lies in this zone, (see Kingdom of Yamma). Yem is bordered on the west and north by the Oromia Region, and separated from Gurage on the northeast and Hadiya on the east by the Omo River. High points in Yem include Mount Bor Ama, Mount Azulu and Mount Toba. The administrative center of Yem is Saja.

The form of subsistence agriculture practiced in this zone is based on cereal and enset. Important cash crops include teff, wheat, barley and pulses. Other important non-agricultural sources of income include selling butter and remittances. According to a 2004 report, Yem had 12 kilometers of asphalt roads, 11 kilometers of all-weather roads and 31 kilometers of dry-weather roads, for an average road density of 81 kilometers per 1,000 square kilometers.

== Demographics ==
Based on the 2007 Census conducted by the Central Statistical Agency of Ethiopia (CSA), this zone has a total population of 80,687, of whom 40,566 are men and 40,121 women; with an area of 647.90 square kilometers, Yem has a population density of 124.54. While 7,952 or 9.86% are urban inhabitants, a further 106 or 0.13% are pastoralists. A total of 17,632 households were counted in this zone, which results in an average of 4.58 persons to a household, and 17,204 housing units. The three most numerous ethnic groups reported in this woreda were the Yem (90.57%), the Oromo (5.41%), and the Hadiya (1.27%); all other ethnic groups made up 2.75% of the population. Yemsa was spoken as a first language by 72.67% of the inhabitants, 22.63% spoke Oromo, 2.57% spoke Amharic, and 1.16% spoke Hadiya; the remaining 0.97% spoke all other primary languages reported. 63.05% of the population said they practiced Ethiopian Orthodox Christianity, 27.09% were Muslim, and 9.61% were Protestants.

In the 1994 Census Yem had a population of 64,852 in 13,643 households, of whom 32,382 were men and 32,470 women; 1,065 or 1.64% of its population were urban dwellers. The three most numerous ethnic groups reported in this zone were the Yem (91.87%), the Oromo (5.6%), and the Hadiya (0.82%); all other ethnic groups made up 1.71% of the population. Yemsa was spoken as a first language by 79.05% of the inhabitants, and 19.24% spoke Oromo; the remaining 1.71% spoke all other primary languages reported. 71.24% of the population said they practiced Ethiopian Orthodox Christianity, 25.14% were Muslim, and 3.48% were Protestants. Concerning education, 29.08% of the population were considered literate; 8.13% of children aged 7–12 were in primary school; 2.33% of the children aged 13–14 were in junior secondary school, and 1.82% of the inhabitants aged 15–18 were in senior secondary school. Concerning sanitary conditions, about 10% of the urban houses and 19% of all houses had access to safe drinking water at the time of the census; 69% of the urban and 33% of the total had toilet facilities.
