= Burji Zone =

Zone in the South Ethiopia Regional State

Coordinates: 5°30′N 37°50′E

Map of the regions and zones of Ethiopia

Burji Zone is one of the zones in the South Ethiopia Regional State of Ethiopia. In August 2023 Burji special Woreda was given zonal status upon the formation of South Ethiopia Region. In 2011, the Segen Area Peoples Zone was established, which includes Burji woreda and the 3 former special woredas surrounding it. It is named for the Burji people, who have their homeland in this zone. Burji is bordered on the east and south by the Oromia Region, on the west by the Konso Zone, and on the north by the Amaro Zone. The administrative center of Burji is Soyama.

Burji has 86 kilometers of all-weather roads and 20 kilometers of dry-weather roads, for an average road density of 80 kilometers per 1000 square kilometers.

== Demographics ==
Based on the 2007 Census conducted by the Central Statistical Agency of Ethiopia (CSA), this zone has a total population of 155,681, of whom 76,439 are men and 79,241 women; with an area of 1,128.40 square kilometers, Burji has a population density of 97.35. While 11.27% are urban inhabitants, a further 12 individuals are pastoralists. A total of 29,690 households were counted in this woreda, which results in an average of 5.24 persons to a household. The three largest ethnic groups reported in Burji were the Burji (80.15%), koore (15.38%) and the Konso (1.03%); all other ethnic groups made up 3.44% of the population. Burji was spoken as a first language by 76.31% of the inhabitants, 15.38% spoke Oromiffa, 5.39% Koorete, and 1.07% Konso; the remaining 1.85% spoke all other primary languages reported. 42.8% were Protestants, 35.82% of the population said they were Ethiopian Orthodox Christianity, and 20.93% were Muslim.

In the 1994 Census this woreda had a population of 108,331 in 20,409 households, of whom 53,190 were men and 55,141 women; 11.47% of its population were urban dwellers. The four largest ethnic groups reported in Burji were the Burji (84.54%), the Koore (11.75%), the Konso (1.3%), and the Amhara (1.06%); all other ethnic groups made up 1.35% of the population. Burji was spoken as a first language by 80.47% of the inhabitants, 13.81% spoke Oromiffa 3.9%Koorete, 0.87% Konso, and 0.66% spoke Amharic; the remaining 0.29% spoke all other primary languages reported. 42.71% of the population said they were Ethiopian Orthodox Christianity, 24.05% were Protestants, 18.05% practiced traditional religions, and 14.29% were Muslim. Concerning education, 24.19% of the population were considered literate; 14.48% of children aged 7-12 were in primary school; 1.62% of the children aged 13-14 were in junior secondary school, and 1.01% of the inhabitants aged 15-18 were in senior secondary school. Concerning sanitary conditions, about 3% of the urban houses and 9% of all houses had access to safe drinking water at the time of the census; 39% of the urban and 6% of the total had toilet facilities.
