= South Ethiopia Regional State =

Regional state in southern Ethiopia

South Ethiopia Regional State: Tohossa Toophphiya Dalgga Manttiya (Wolaytta); ደቡብ ኢትዮጵያ ክልላዊ መንግስት (Amharic)
- Regional state
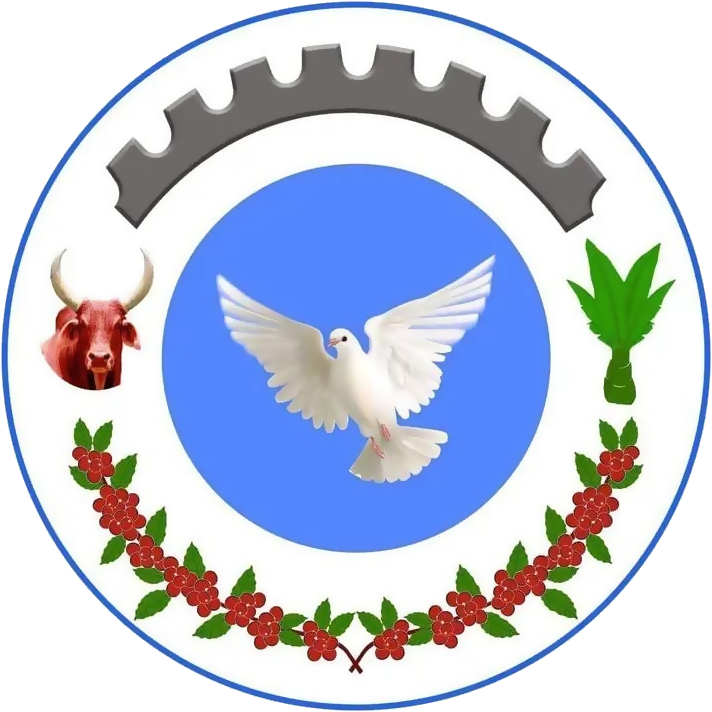
- Flag Seal

- Map of Ethiopia showing the South Ethiopia Regional State
- Coordinates: 6°51′10″N 37°45′16″E
- Country: Ethiopia
- Referendum: 6 February 2023
- Formation: 19 August 2023
- Capital: Wolaita Sodo

Government
  - Chief Administrator: Tesfaye Beljige (Dr.) (Prosperity Party)
  - Party delegate: Abebayehu Tadesse (Dr)
  - Chief Speaker of the House: Kasech Elias

Area
  - Total: 45,209.26 km^{2} (17,455.39 sq mi)

Population (2025)
  - Total: 7,842,000
  - Rank: 4th
  - Density: 173.5/km^{2} (449.3/sq mi)
- ISO 3166 code: ET-SE
- Website: South Ethiopia Regional State Official Website

The South Ethiopia Regional State (Amharic: ደቡብ ኢትዮጵያ ክልላዊ መንግስት, romanized: debubi ītiyop’iya kililawī menigisiti) is a region in southern Ethiopia. It was formed from the southern part of the Southern Nations, Nationalities, and Peoples' Region (SNNPR) on 19 August 2023 after a successful referendum.

Wolaita Sodo is the region's political and administrative center. Other regional bureaus were established in Wolaita Sodo, Dilla, Arba Minch, Sawla, Karati and Jinka.

== Chief administrators ==
List of chief administrators of the South Ethiopia Regional State
| Number | Incumbent | Tenure | Portrait | Affiliation | Notes |
|---|---|---|---|---|---|
| 1 | Tilahun Kebede | 19 August 2023 - 30 September 2026 | | Prosperity Party | |
| 2 | Tesfaye Beljige (Dr.) | 02 October 2026 - present | | Prosperity Party | |

== Administrative Zones ==
The following list shows founding and newly established zones in South Ethiopia Regional State.

Zones in the South Ethiopia Regional State
| Number | Zone | Seat |
|---|---|---|
| 1 | Wolayita Zone | Wolaita Sodo |
| 2 | Gamo Zone | Arba Minch |
| 3 | Gofa Zone | Sawla |
| 4 | Gedeo Zone | Dilla |
| 5 | South Omo Zone | Dimeka |
| 6 | Ari Zone | Jinka |
| 7 | Konso Zone | Karati |
| 8 | Gardula Zone | Gidole |
| 9 | Burji Zone | Soyama |
| 10 | Koore Zone | Kele |
| 11 | Basketo Zone | Laska |
| 12 | Ale Zone | Kolango |
