= Hadiyya language =

Cushitic language spoken in Ethiopia

Hadiyya
- Native to: Ethiopia
- Region: Hadiya Zone of Southern Nations, Nationalities, and People's Region
- Ethnicity: Hadiya
- Native speakers: 1,300,000 (2007 census)
- Language family: Afro-Asiatic: Cushitic; Highland East Cushitic; Hadiyya
- Dialects: Hadiyya; Soro; Leemo
- Writing system: Latin, Ge’ez

Language codes
- ISO 639-3: hdy
- Glottolog: hadi1240

Hadiyya (speakers call it Hadiyyisa, others sometimes call it Hadiyigna, Adiya, Adea, Adiye, Hadia, Hadiya, Hadya) is the language of the Hadiya people of Ethiopia. Over 1.2 million people speak Hadiyya, making it one of the ten major languages in Ethiopia. It is a Highland East Cushitic language of the Afroasiatic family. Most speakers live in the Hadiya Zone of the Southern Nations, Nationalities, and People's Region (SNNPR). The language has four recognized dialects—Leemo, Badawacho, Shashogo, and Sooro. These are mutually intelligible, with slight regional variations.

The closely related Libido language, located just to the north in the Mareko district of Gurage Zone, is very similar lexically, but has significant morphological differences. Historically oral, Hadiyya is now written using a Latin-based orthography, developed for educational and administrative use. Hadiyya has a set of complex consonant phonemes consisting of a glottal stop and a sonorant: /ʔr/, /ʔj/, /ʔw/, /ʔl/.

In their book (English version 1999), Braukämper and Mishago compiled a reasonably sized collection of the presently vanishing art of traditional songs of Hadiyya. The lyrics adhere to the strict rule of Hadiyya traditional poetry where rhythmical rhyming occurs at the beginning of the verse.

The New Testament of the Christian Bible has been translated into Hadiyya, published by the Bible Society of Ethiopia in 1993. It was originally produced using the traditional Ethiopic syllabary. A later printing used the Latin alphabet.

== Phonology ==
=== Consonants ===
The phonology of the Hadiyya language, part of the Highland East Cushitic branch of the Afroasiatic language family, is characterized by its unique consonantal and vowel systems, syllable structure, and morphophonemic processes. Hadiyya has 23 consonant phonemes categorized by place and manner of articulation:

		Labial	Dental/ Alveolar	Palatal	Velar	Glottal
Plosive/ Affricate	voiceless		t	tʃ	k	ʔ
Plosive/ Affricate	voiced	b	d	dʒ	g	
Plosive/ Affricate	ejective	pʼ	tʼ	tʃʼ	kʼ	
Fricative	voiceless	f	s	ʃ		h
Fricative	voiced		z			
Nasal	voiced	m	n			
Nasal	preglottal	ʔm	ʔn			
Rhotic			r			
Approximant	voiced	w	l	j		
Approximant	preglottal		ʔl			

- /r/ can be heard as either a flap [ɾ] or a trill [r].
- Gemination can occur in most consonants word-medially, except for /r, z, h, ʔ/.

=== Vowels ===
	Front	Central	Back
Close	i iː		u uː
Mid	e eː		o oː
Open		a aː	

==== Vowel System ====
Hadiyya has a set of five vowel phonemes: /a, e, i, o, u/. These vowels exhibit:

- Phonemic vowel length: The length of vowels changes word meanings (e.g., short /a/ vs. long /aa/).
- Distribution restrictions: Certain vowels co-occur only under specific conditions.

==== Pitch Accent ====
Hadiyya exhibits a pitch accent system, where pitch can distinguish lexical or grammatical meanings. This is a defining feature of Highland East Cushitic languages.

== Orthography ==
The Hadiyya (Hadiyyisa) language alphabet
Letter	Name (IPA)	Example(s)
A a	[a]	mato (one), Waa’aa (God)
B b	[ba]	baxo (work), lobakata (much, many)
C c	[tʃ’a]	maceesee (hear me), cawoomoo (I’ll be silent)
CH ch	[tʃa]	manchoo (man), heechaa (life)
D d	[da]	daddaraanchoo (merchant), danaamoo (good, beautiful)
E e	[e]	neesee (us), eranee (well, good)
F f	[fa]	hoffanee (small), fatakimaa or fatahimaa (to release)
G g	[ga]	gatisima (to save, to secure), gaga (self)
H h	[ha]	hasee (find it), halichoo (donkey)
I i	[i]	iihanee (mine), hinkid (how)
J j	[dʒa]	joraa (bad), jagara (small residence usually next to a bigger one)
K k	[ka]	ka (‘you’ for male), kuk (this)
L l	[la]	lelee (play), laroo (cows)
M m	[ma]	ma’ccee (ear), maree (go)
N n	[na]	nafaraa (meadow in front area), neesee (us)
NY ny	[ɲa]	adapted for loan words such as "sanyo" (monday) of Amharic
O o	[o]	meenticcoo (woman or the woman), woroon (below)
P p	[pa]	adapted for loan words such as "politics" from English, and "police" from Amharic/English. However, monolingual Hadiya actually change the sound to [ba] in their speech
PH ph	[p’a]	aphisee (hit it), ccoophaaroo’o (food – minsed meat/greens in butter & spices)
Q q	[k’a]	qoxaraa (strong), ha’qaa (wood)
R r	[ra]	hurbaata (food), woro’nee (in)
S s	[sa]	lasagee (later), so’oo (barley)
SH sh	[ʃa]	shokkiissoohanee (hot, burning), bashillaa (far)
T t	[ta]	diinatee (money or cattle), matayanoo (being busy)
TS ts	[s’a]	adapted for loan words such as ‘tsom’ (fasting) of Amharic
U u	[u]	Uulla (earth or one’s plot/plat), hundam (all of it)
V v	[va]	adapted for loan words such as ‘university’ of English
W w	[wa]	weeraa (cedar tree), wo’oo (water)
X x	[t’a]	wiximaa (seeding), iix (he)
Y y	[ya]	iiyyimaa (carrying), malayyee (strength, force)
Z z	[za]	zara (race or ethnic group)
ZH zh	[ʒa]	adapted for loan words such as ‘gezhii’ (governor) of Amharic
’ (no allograph)	[ʔa]	ki’aakka’a (rising), liira’imito’oo (they rejoiced)

== Grammar ==
=== General features of the hadiyyan grammar ===
Word Order: Hadiyya follows a Subject-Object-Verb (SOV) word order.

Agglutinative Morphology: Words are built through the addition of suffixes and infixes, marking tense, aspect, case, number, and more.

Case Marking: Nouns and pronouns are marked for various cases, reflecting their grammatical roles in sentences.

Pitch Accent: Hadiyya employs a pitch accent system, where changes in pitch can distinguish word meanings or grammatical forms.

=== Nouns ===
Hadiyya has a detailed system for marking nouns, with about nine main cases: absolutive (the basic form), nominative, genitive, dative, ablative, locative, instrumental, comitative, and similative. The absolutive is used for subjects in simple sentences and objects when the subject performs an action. If a noun is definite, specific suffixes are added to show its role in the sentence, while indefinite nouns remain unmarked in some cases.

Hadiyya also uses postpositions (similar to prepositions in English) that combine with certain cases, like the genitive or dative, to express relationships like possession or location. Reflexive forms are common, where a suffix shows that a noun belongs to the subject of the sentence (e.g., "his own house").

Adjectives in Hadiyya usually match the nouns they describe in gender, number, and definiteness, but they don’t take case suffixes unless the noun is implied. Special suffixes are also used to create related nouns, such as ones that describe tools, doers of actions, or abstract ideas. This system makes Hadiyya a rich and expressive language, typical of its Highland East Cushitic family.

==== Pronouns ====
Hadiyya has a detailed system of pronouns that are essential for expressing relationships, ownership, and forming questions. Below is an overview of the key types of pronouns.

Personal pronouns in Hadiyya indicate the speaker, listener, or others. They are distinguished by person (first, second, third), number (singular or plural), and sometimes gender.

- Examples:
  - First Person: ane (‘I’), neen (‘we’)
  - Second Person: att (‘you’ singular), ateen (‘you all’)
  - Third Person: isu (‘he’), isa (‘she’), isen (‘they’)

Possessive pronouns show ownership and are typically formed by adding possessive suffixes to nouns. They agree with the possessor in person and number.

- Examples:
  - guri-ane (‘my house’)
  - guri-att (‘your house’)
  - guri-isen (‘their house’)

== Numerals - t'íga ==
N	Number
1	máto
2	lámo
3	sáso
4	soóro
5	ʔónto
6	lóho
7	lamára
8	sadeénto
9	hónso
10	tómmo

When combining numerals, in Hadiyya from the numbers 11-99, you attach the base of the decade with the unit, using a structure that translates as “[decade] + [unit]”. For example:

21: Tommá máto ("20 and 1")

35: Sómmo ʔónto ("30 and 5")

48: Soóre sadeénto ("40 and 8")

N	Numbers
10	tommoó
20	tommá
30	sómmo
40	soóre
50	ʔónta
60	lóhonta
70	lamárta
80	sadeénta
90	hónsájje
100	ʃíha

After 100, the speakers of Hadiyya combine the numeral of 100 with the decades and the units of the numerals before.

142: ʃíha sóore lámo ("100 and 40 and 2")
