= Kambaata language =

Highland East Cushitic language in Ethiopia

Kambaata
- Kambaatissata
- Native to: Ethiopia
- Region: Southwest Gurage, Kambaata, Hadiyya Regions
- Ethnicity: Kambaata
- Native speakers: 740,000 (2007 census)
- Language family: Afro-Asiatic: Cushitic; Highland East; Kambaata
- Writing system: Ethiopic, Latin

Language codes
- ISO 639-3: Either: ktb – Kambaata alw – Alaba-K’abeena
- Glottolog: kamb1318

Kambaata is a Highland East Cushitic language spoken in Ethiopia. It is part of the larger Afro-Asiatic family and spoken by the Kambaata people. Closely related varieties are Xambaaro (T'ambaaro, Timbaaro), Alaba, and Qabeena (K'abeena), of which the latter two are sometimes divided as a separate Alaba language. The language has many verbal affixes. When these are affixed to verbal roots, there are a large amount of morphophonemic changes. The language has subject–object–verb order. The phonemes of Kambaata include five vowels (which are distinctively long or short), a set of ejectives, a retroflexed implosive, and glottal stop.

The New Testament and some parts of the Old Testament have been translated into the Kambaata language. At first, they were published in the Ethiopian syllabary (New Testament in 1992), but later on, they were republished in Latin letters, in conformity with new policies and practices.

== Phonology ==
Here is the phonology of the Kambaata language.

Consonants
| | | Labial | Alveolar | Palatal | Velar | Glottal |
|---|---|---|---|---|---|---|
| Plosive/Affricate | voiceless | | t | tʃ | k | ʔ |
| Plosive/Affricate | voiced | b | d | dʒ | g | |
| Plosive/Affricate | ejective | pʼ | tʼ | tʃʼ | kʼ | |
| Fricative | voiceless | f | s | ʃ | | h |
| Fricative | voiced | | z | (ʒ) | | |
| Nasal | | m | n | (ɲ) | | |
| Lateral | plain | | l | | | |
| Lateral | glottalized | | lˀ | | | |
| Trill | plain | | r | | | |
| Trill | glottalized | | rˀ | | | |
| Semivowel | | w | | j | | |

Kambaata has a simple five vowel system /a, e, i, o, u/, contrasting long vowels and nasalized vowels (but only marginally).
