= Mareko special woreda =

Mareko Special Woreda (Amharic: ማረቆ ልዩ ወረዳ) is one of the woredas in the Central Ethiopia Regional State. This woreda is named after the Mareko people. The administrative center of this special woreda is Koshe.

== Demographics ==
Based on the 2007 Census conducted by the CSA, this woreda has a total population of 64,512, of whom 32,730 are men and 31,782 women; 6,880 or 10.67% of its population are urban dwellers. The majority of the inhabitants were reported as Muslim, with 84.02% of the population reporting that belief, while 7.98% practice Ethiopian Orthodox Christianity, and 7.41% were Protestants.
