= Districts of Ethiopia =

Administrative divisions of Ethiopia

Subdivisions of Ethiopia. The darkest lines indicate Regions, the lighter lines Zones, and the white lines Districts.

Districts of Ethiopia, also called woredas (Amharic: ወረዳ; Oromo: woreda), are the third level of the administrative divisions of Ethiopia – after zones and the regional states.

These districts are further subdivided into a number of wards called kebele neighbourhood associations, which are the smallest unit of local government in Ethiopia.

== Overview ==
Districts are typically collected together into zones, which form a region; districts which are not part of a zone are designated Special Districts and function as autonomous entities. Districts are governed by a council whose members are directly elected to represent each kebele in the district. There are about 670 rural districts and about 100 urban districts.

Terminology varies, with some people considering the urban units to be woreda, while others consider only the rural units to be woreda, referring to the others as urban or city administrations.

Although some districts can be traced back to earliest times—for example, the Yem special woreda, the Gera and Gomma woreda which preserve the boundaries of kingdoms that were absorbed into Ethiopia, and the Mam Midrina Lalo Midir woreda of a historic province of Ethiopia (in this case, two of the districts of Menz)— many are of more recent creation. Beginning in 2002, more authority was passed to woreda by transferring staff and budgets from the regional governments.

=== Structure ===
In Ethiopia, the woredas comprise three main organs: a council, an executive and a judicial. The Woreda Council is the highest government organ of the district, which is made up of directly elected representatives from each kebele in the woredas. The representative of the people in each kebele is accountable to their electorate. The woreda chief administration is the district's executive organ that encompasses the district administrator, deputy administrator, and the head of the main sectoral executive offices found in the district, which are ultimately accountable to the district administrator and district council. The quasi-judicial tasks belong to the Security and Justice administration. In addition to woredas, city administrations are considered at the same level as the woredas. A city administration has a mayor whom members of the city council elected. As different regional constitutions govern woredas, the names of the bodies may differ.

=== Special woredas ===
"Special woredas" are a subgroup of woredas (districts) that are organized around the traditional homelands of an ethnic minority, and are outside the usual hierarchy of zones in their respective Region. These special woredas have many similarities to autonomous areas in other countries.

List of special woredas

- Argobba (Afar)
- Argobba (Amhara)
- Itang
- Kebena
- Mao-Komo
- Mareko
- Pawe
- Tembaro
