= Regions of Ethiopia =

Regional states and chartered cities of Ethiopia
- Category: Federation
- Location: Federal Democratic Republic of Ethiopia
- Created: 1992
- Number: 12 regions, 2 chartered cities
- Government: Region government
- Subdivisions: 2nd level: Zones 3rd level: Woredas (districts)

Ethiopia is a federation subdivided into ethno-linguistically based regional states (Amharic: plural: ክልሎች kililoch; singular: ክልል kilil; Oromo: singular: Naannoo; plural: Naannolee) and chartered cities (Amharic: plural: አስተዳደር አካባቢዎች astedader akababiwoch; singular: አስተዳደር አካባቢ astedader akabibi). This system of administrative regions replaced the provinces of Ethiopia in 1992.

There are twelve regional states and two chartered cities (Addis Ababa and Dire Dawa). Being based on ethnicity and language, rather than physical geography or history, the regions vary enormously in area and population; the most notable example is the Harari Region, which has a smaller area and population than either of the chartered cities.

== Governance ==
The regions are each governed by a regional council whose members are directly elected to represent woredas (districts). Each council has a president, who is elected by the council. Each region also has an executive committee, whose members are selected by the president from among the councilors and approved by the council. Each region has a sector bureau, which implements the council mandate and reports to the executive committee.

== History ==
Ethiopia was historically divided into provinces. The current system of administrative regions was introduced in 1992 by the Transitional Government of Ethiopia, and was formalised in 1995 when the current Constitution of Ethiopia came into force.

There were 13 regions initially, but five regions were merged to form the multi-ethnic Southern Nations, Nationalities, and Peoples' Region (SNNPR) later in 1992, following the first elections of regional councils on 21 June 1992. Addis Ababa, the country's capital, and Dire Dawa became chartered cities in 2004.

=== New regions ===
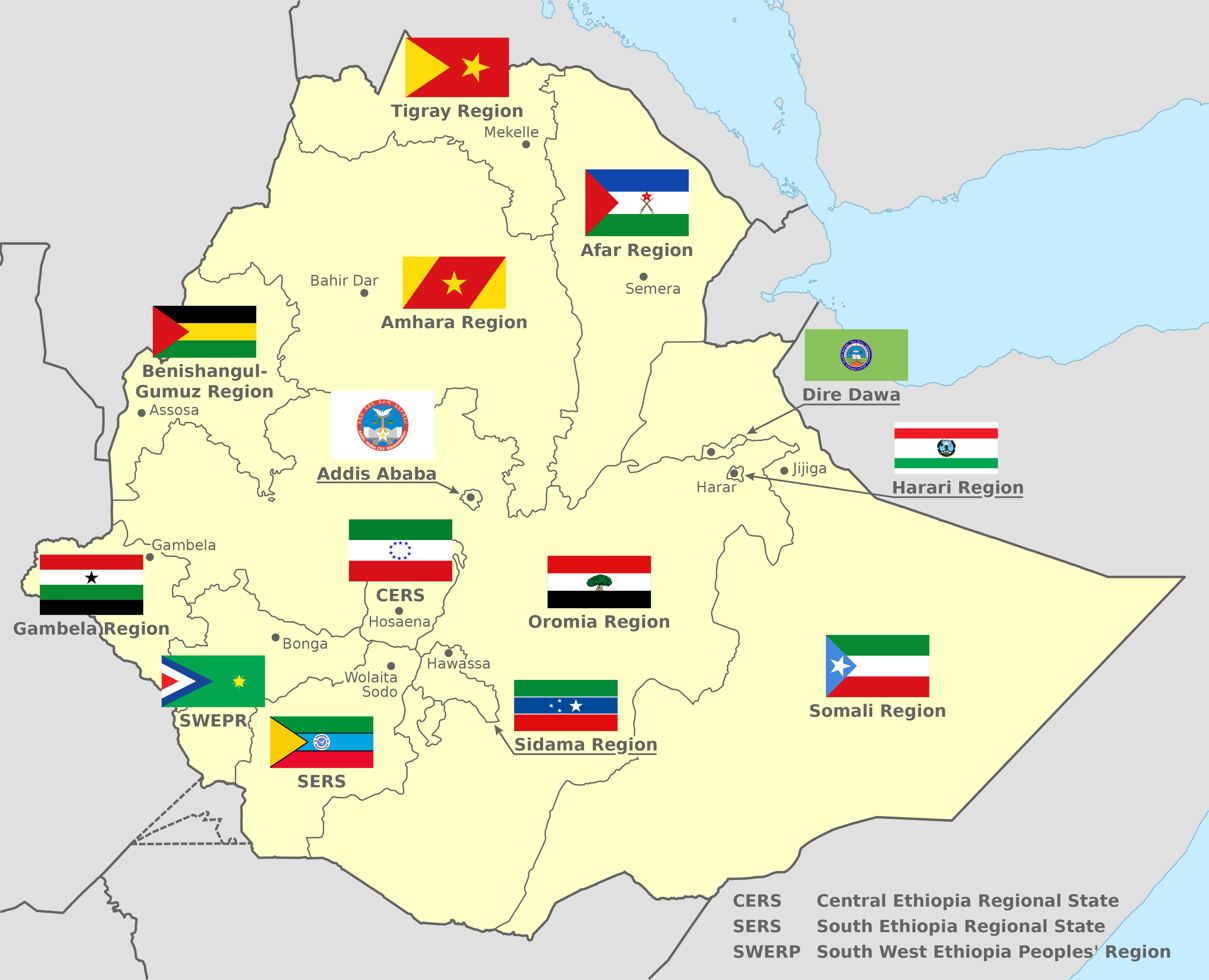
The current regions and chartered cities of Ethiopia, their respective flags, their capitals, and their largest cities

During the premiership of Abiy Ahmed, 3 new regions have been created.

In November 2019, a referendum was held in the Sidama Zone of the SNNPR, in which voters supported a proposal for Sidama Zone to become a region in its own right. The Sidama Region was created in June 2020.

The South West Ethiopia Region was created on 23 November 2021 following a successful referendum earlier that year. The new region was split off from the SNNPR and consisted of Keffa, Sheka, Bench Sheko, Dawro, and West Omo Zones, along with Konta special district.

On 19 August 2023 the South Ethiopia Regional State was created following the 2023 South Ethiopia Region referendum, with the remainder becoming the Central Ethiopia Regional State, thus dissolving the SNNPR.

== List of regions and chartered cities ==
The twelve regions and two city administrations
Flag	Name	Population (2025)	Area (km^{2})	Population density (per km²)	Capital	Map
	Addis Ababa (city)	6,287,000	527	11,900	Addis Ababa	
	Afar Region	2,525,000	72,051	35.04	Semera	
	Amhara Region	32,936,000	154,709	169.16	Bahir Dar	
	Benishangul-Gumuz Region	1,096,000	50,699	21.62	Asosa	
	Central Ethiopia Regional State	9,521,000	15,098.97	630.6	Hosaina	
	Dire Dawa (city)	600,000	1,559	490	Dire Dawa	
	Gambela Region	496,000	29,783	16.7	Gambela	
	Harari Region	312,000	334	934	Harar	
	Oromia Region	44,597,000	284,538	100	Addis Ababa (de jure); Adama (de facto)	
	Sidama Region	4,868,000	12,000	744.6	Hawassa	
	Somali Region	12,615,000	279,525	35.81	Jijiga	
	South Ethiopia Regional State	7,842,000	45,209.26	173.5	Wolaita Sodo	
	South West Ethiopia Peoples' Region	2,473,000	39,400	62.8	Bonga	
	Tigray Region	7,467,000	50,079	140.8	Mek'ele	

== See also ==
- List of governors of the regions of Ethiopia
- Flags of the regions of Ethiopia
- List of Ethiopian regions by Human Development Index
- ISO 3166-2:ET
- Subdivisions of Ethiopia
- List of Ethiopian regional states by population
