= Goro, SNNPR (woreda) =

Former district in Southern Nations, Nationalities, and Peoples' Region, Ethiopia

Coordinates: 8°20′N 37°40′E

Goro was one of the 77 woredas in the Southern Nations, Nationalities, and Peoples' Region of Ethiopia. This woreda was named after one of the sub-groups of the Sebat Bet Gurage, the Goro. Part of the Gurage Zone, Goro was bordered on the south by the Wabe River which separates it from Cheha, on the west and north by the Oromia Region, on the farther east by Kokir Gedebano Gutazer, and on the southeast by Ezhana Wolene. The major town in Goro was Welkite. Goro was divided for Abeshge, Kebena and Welkite woredas.

Local landmarks include the Acho Falls on the Wabe river which is 60 meters in height, and Walga Falls on the Walga river which is 30 meters in height.

Goro was selected by the Ministry of Agriculture and Rural Development in 2004 as one of several woredas for voluntary resettlement for farmers from overpopulated areas, becoming the new home for a total of 3000 heads of households and 12,000 total family members.

== Demographics ==
Based on figures published by the Central Statistical Agency in 2005, this woreda has an estimated total population of 169,000, of whom 84,033 are men and 84,967 are women; 27,775 or 16.43% of its population are urban dwellers, which is greater than the Zone average of 6.3%. With an estimated area of 925.01 square kilometers, Goro has an estimated population density of 182.7 people per square kilometer, which is less than the Zone average of 278.3. In the 1990s, a survey revealed an isolated enclave of 1,000 speakers of Gumuz around Welkite, a language otherwise found only in western Ethiopia.

The 1994 national census reported a total population for this woreda of 115,583 of whom 58,193 were men and 57,390 were women; 15,329 or 13.26% of its population were urban dwellers. The five largest ethnic groups reported in Goro were the Sebat Bet Gurage (38.56%), the Kebena (22.67%), the Amhara (14.48%), the Silte (10.02%) and the Oromo (7.49%); all other ethnic groups made up 6.18% of the population. Sebat Bet Gurage is spoken as a first language by 31.82%, 24.19% Amharic, 22.67% speak Kebena, 10.77% Silte, and 6.08% speak Afan Oromo; the remaining 4.47% spoke all other primary languages reported. 62.53% of the population said they were Muslim, 31.71% practiced Ethiopian Orthodox Christianity, 4.79% were Protestants, and 0.92% Catholic. Concerning education, 30.3% of the population were considered literate, which is more than the Zone average of 20.62%; 21.04% of children aged 7–12 were in primary school, 6.2% of the children aged 13–14 were in junior secondary school, and 5.56% of the inhabitants aged 15–18 were in senior secondary school. Concerning sanitary conditions, 93% of the urban houses and 36.69% of all houses had access to safe drinking water at the time of the census; 30.36% of the urban and 6.39% of all houses had toilet facilities.
