= Meskanena Mareko =

Former district in Southern Nations, Nationalities, and Peoples' Region, Ethiopia

Meskanena Mareko ("Meskane and Mareko") was one of the 77 woredas in the Southern Nations, Nationalities, and Peoples' Region of Ethiopia. Part of the Gurage Zone, Meskanena Mareko was bordered on the south by Silte, on the southwest by Gumer, on the west by Ezhana Wolene, on the northwest by Kokir Gedebano Gutazer, on the north by Sodo, and on the east by the Oromia Region. Towns in Meskanena Mareko included Butajira and Inseno. Meskanena Mareko was divided for Mareko and Meskane woredas and Butajira town.

Near Butajira are the Tufta Swamps at 8°8′N 38°24′E, located in the Western highlands near the headwaters of the Meki River.

== Demographics ==
Based on figures published by the Central Statistical Agency in 2005, this woreda has an estimated total population of 331,832, of whom 166,875 are men and 164,957 are women; 53,343 or 16.08% of its population are urban dwellers, which is greater than the Zone average of 6.3%. With an estimated area of 872.5 square kilometers, Meskanena Mareko has an estimated population density of 380.3 people per square kilometer, which is greater than the Zone average of 278.3.

The 1994 national census reported a total population for this woreda of 227,135 of whom 113,095 were males and 114,040 were females; 29,440 or 12.96% of its population were urban dwellers. The five largest ethnic groups reported in Meskanena Mareko were the Meskan sub-group of the Sebat Bet Gurage (35.62%), the Silte (22.36%), the Mareqo or Libido (15.7%), the Soddo Gurage (12.06%) and the Amhara (3.65%); all other ethnic groups made up 10.61% of the population. Sebat Bet Gurage is spoken as a first language by 32.25%, 21.8% Silte, 14.7% speak Libido, 11.35% speak Soddo Gurage, and 9.88% speak Amharic; the remaining 10.02% spoke all other primary languages reported. 62.32% of the population said they were Muslim, 32.70% practiced Ethiopian Orthodox Christianity, and 1.77% were Protestants. Concerning education, 22.8% of the population were considered literate, which is more than the Zone average of 20.62%; 7.75% of children aged 7–12 were in primary school, 1.8% of the children aged 13–14 were in junior secondary school, and 1.82% of the inhabitants aged 15–18 were in senior secondary school. Concerning sanitary conditions, 74.95% of the urban houses and 19.98% of all houses had access to safe drinking water at the time of the census; 52.98% of the urban and 8.49% of all houses had toilet facilities.

== See also ==
- Yetebon
