= Muhor Na Aklil =

Muhor Na Aklil is one of the woredas in the Southern Nations, Nationalities, and Peoples' Region of Ethiopia. This woreda is named after the sub-group of the Sebat Bet Gurage, the Muher and Aklil. Part of the Gurage Zone, Muhor Na Aklil is bordered on the south by Ezha, on the northwest by Kebena, on the north by Kokir Gedebano, and on the east by Meskane. It was part of former Ezhana Wolene woreda.

== Demographics ==
Based on the 2007 Census conducted by the CSA, this woreda has a total population of 87,756, of whom 41,022 are men and 46,734 women; 723 or 0.82% of its population are urban dwellers. The majority of the inhabitants practiced Ethiopian Orthodox Christianity, with 73.51% of the population reporting that belief, while 25.68% were Muslim.
