= Ezha =

District in Southern Nations, Nationalities, and Peoples' Region, Ethiopia

Ezha is one of the woredas in the Southern Nations, Nationalities, and Peoples' Region of Ethiopia. This woreda is named after the sub-group of the Sebat Bet Gurage, the Ezha. Part of the Gurage Zone, Ezha is bordered on the south by Gumer, on the west by Cheha, on the north by Kebena and Muhor Na Aklil, and on the southeast by Silt'e Zone and Meskan. The major town in Ezha is Agenna. It was part of the former Ezhana Wolene woreda.

== Demographics ==
Based on the 2007 Census conducted by the CSA, this woreda has a total population of 784,905, of whom 340,261 are men and 444,644 women; 50% of its population are urban dwellers. The majority of the inhabitants practiced Ethiopian Orthodox Christianity, with 65.61% of the population reporting that belief, while 31.47% were Muslim, and 2.35% were P'ent'ay (Protestants).
