= Abeshge =

District of Ethiopia

Coordinates: 8°17′18.4″N 37°46′47.8″E

Abeshge is one of the woredas in the Southern Nations, Nationalities, and Peoples' Region of Ethiopia. Part of the Gurage Zone, Abeshge is bordered on the south by the Wabe River which separates it from Cheha, on the west and north by the Oromia Region, and on the east by Kebena. It was part of former Goro woreda.

== Demographics ==
Based on the 2007 Census conducted by the CSA, this woreda has a total population of 61,424, of whom 32,450 are men and 28,974 women; none of the population were urban inhabitants. The majority of the inhabitants practiced Ethiopian Orthodox Christianity, with 50.8% of the population reporting that belief, while 31.96% were Muslim, 15.82% were Protestants, and 1.28% were Catholic.
