= List of districts in the Southern Nations, Nationalities, and Peoples' Region =

This is a list of the woredas, or districts, in the Southern Nations, Nationalities, and Peoples' Region of Ethiopia, compiled from material on the Central Statistical Agency website.

== Defunct districts/woredas ==
- Awasa (woreda)
- Badawacho
- Bena Tsemay
- Bench (woreda)
- Boreda Abaya
- Dita Dermalo
- Ezhana Wolene
- Gofa Zuria
- Goro
- Hamer Bena
- Isara Tocha
- Konteb
- Loma Bosa
- Mareka Gena
- Masha Anderacha
- Meinit
- Meskanena Mareko
- Omo Sheleko
- Zala Ubamale
