= East Gurage Zone =

Zone in the Central Ethiopia Regional State

East Gurage Zone ምስራቅ ጉራጌ ዞን
- Zone
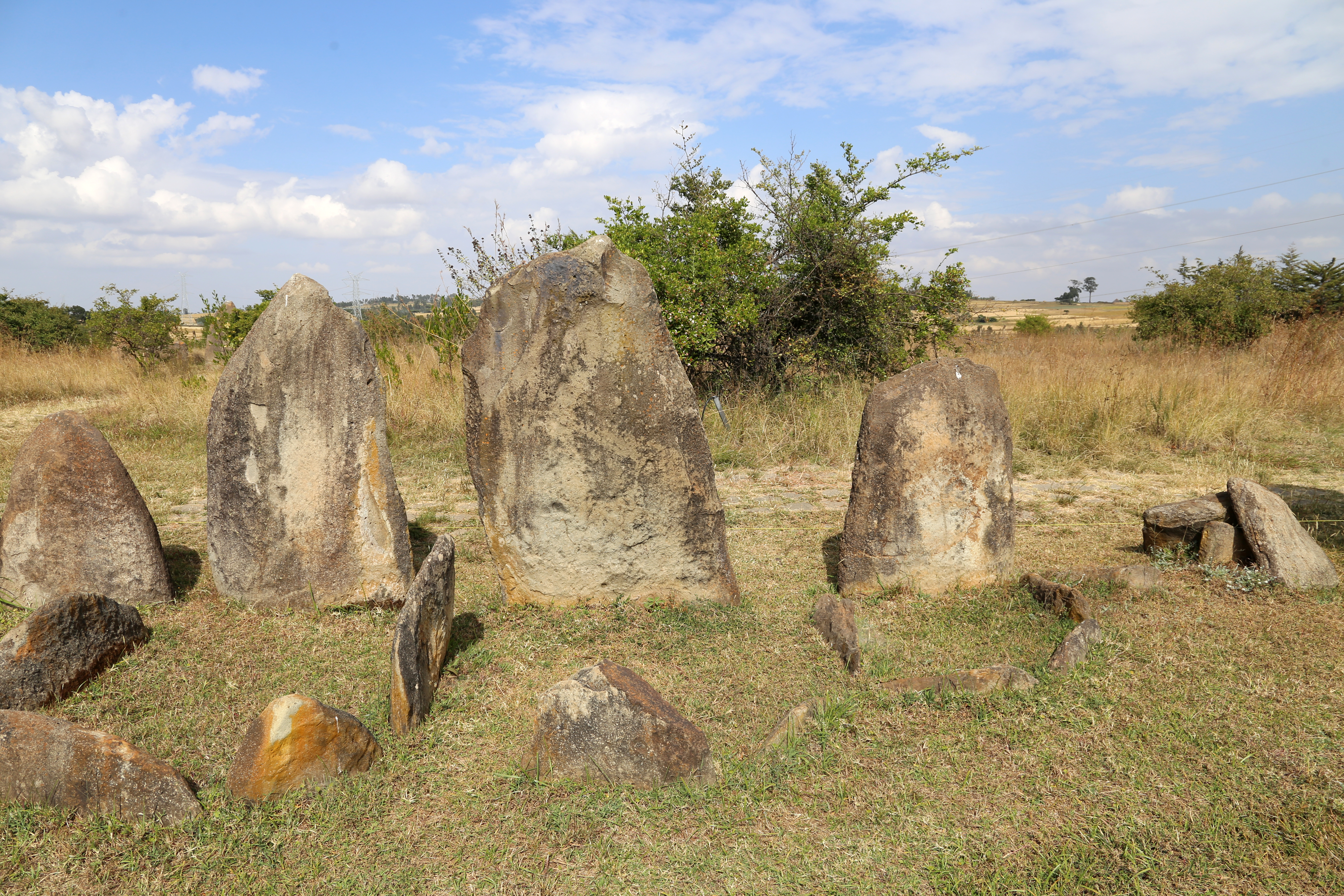
- Tiya archeological site

- Location within Ethiopia Location within Africa
- Country: Ethiopia
- Region: Central Ethiopia Regional State
- Established: 2023
- Seat: Butajira

Government
  - Chief administrator: Mustafa Hasen (Prosperity Party)
- Time zone: UTC+3 (East Africa Time)
- Area code: (+251) 11

East Gurage Zone (Amharic: ምስራቅ ጉራጌ ዞን) is a zonal administration in the Central Ethiopia Regional State of Ethiopia. East Gurage Zone is established in 2023 by union of three districts and two town administrations from eastern part of Gurage Zone. The Zone is home to the Gurage people and others. East Gurage is bordered on the Southeast by Siltʼe Zone North and East by the Oromia Region, and on the West by Gurage Zone. The Zone borders Mareko Special Woreda through its East Meskan District. The administrative centre of the Zone is Butajira.

== Woredas ==
The regions and zones of Ethiopia

East Gurage Zone is formed from the union of three city administrations and four woredas. These administrative divisions are shown in the following table.

Woredas and City administrations in East Gurage Zone Zone
Number	Woredas	Seat
1	East Meskan	Enseno*
2	Meskane	Butajira*
3	Sodo Woreda	Buee*
4	South Soddo	Kella

• City administrations, which are considered as Woreda for all administrative purposes.
