= Endegagn =

District in the Central Ethiopia Regional State

Endegagn (Amharic: እንደጋኝ) is a woreda in the Central Ethiopia Regional State of Ethiopia. This woreda is named after the Endegagn dialect of Inor language spoken by Gurage people. Part of the Gurage Zone, Endegagn is bordered on the southeast by the Silt'e Zone, on the southwest by Hadiya Zone, on the north by Enemorina Eaner, on the north by the Oromia Region, on the northeast by Sodo, and on the northeast by Geta. Endegagn was separated from the Enemorina Eaner woreda.

== Demographics ==
Based on the 2007 Census conducted by the CSA, this woreda has a total population of 49,171, of whom 22,854 are men and 26,317 women; 766 or 1.56% of its population are urban dwellers. The majority of the inhabitants practiced Ethiopian Orthodox Christianity, with 75.26% of the population reporting that belief, while 21.86% were reported as Muslim, and 2.85% were Protestants.
