= Megaliths in Ethiopia =

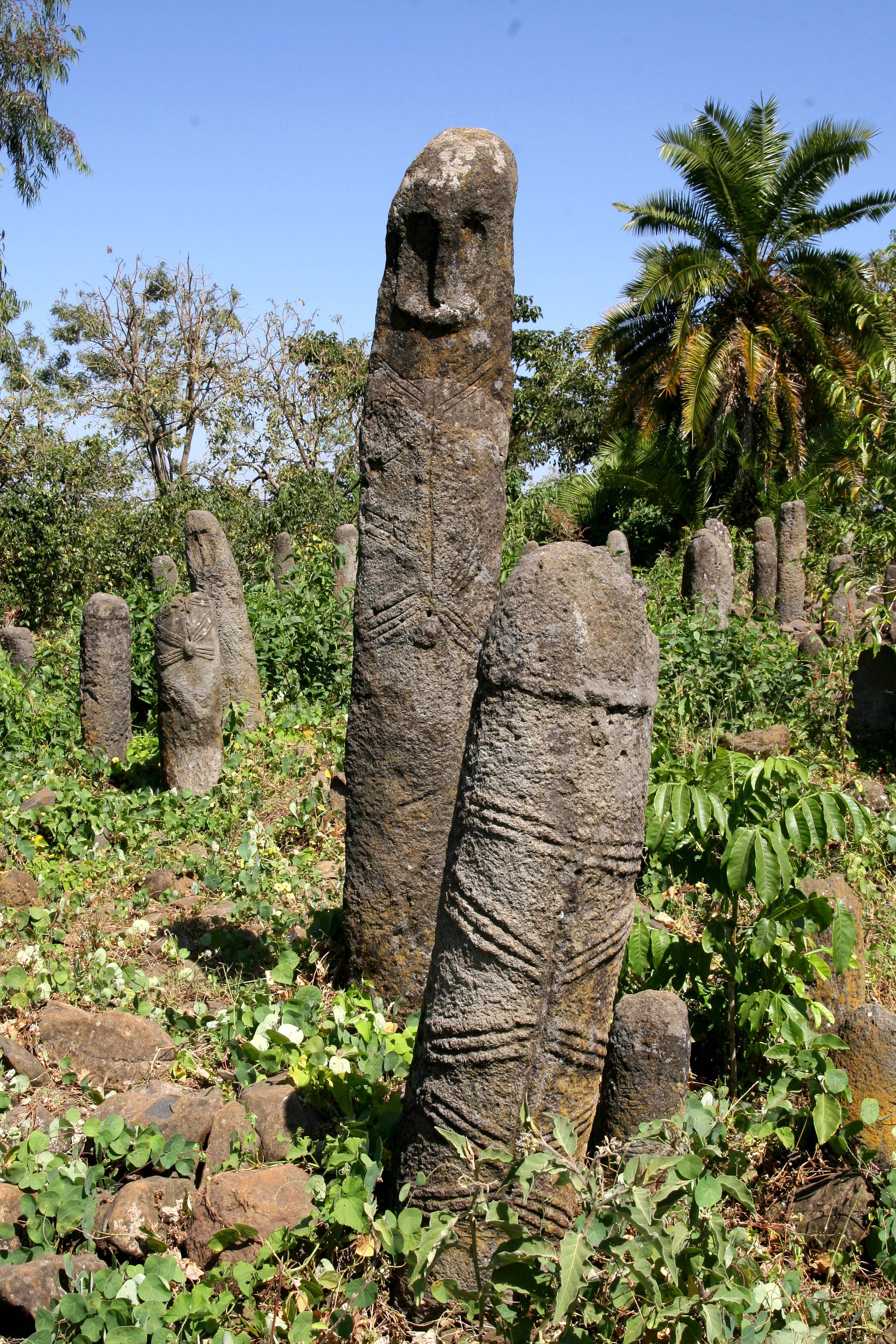
Tutofela Stelae site

Megaliths in Ethiopia are large, monumental stones, that exist in Ethiopia.

Megalithic monuments exist in all regions of Ethiopia. Most of these sites are located in the Southern Nation Nationalities and peoples Regional State (SNNPRS). The major megalithic sites are found in Gedeo Zone, Gurage Zone and Sidama Zone. Tiya is one of the megalithic sites registered by UNESCO. Stelae, tumuli and dolmens are the common megalithic monuments found in Ethiopia.

Megalith is a Greek word meaning big stone. The term megaliths first coined by Algernon Herbert in 1849. The Concise Oxford Dictionary of Archaeology (2003) describes megaliths as a general term applied to monuments of Neolithic and early Bronze Age in northwest Europe. It is used for tombs and standing stones, forming circles Dolmen, Alignment and Menhir. Megaliths are large stone structures built without mortar.

The existence of stelae, dolmens, tumuli, stone pillar and stone circle/ stone have been reported from North Africa, West Africa and East Africa. Megalithic tradition was one of the common practices in most part of Africa. The megaliths have direct or indirect related to ritual activities. The ritual activities conducted by the Bodi peoples in the Omo Valley, southern Ethiopia, can be mentioned as a good example. The Bodi are one of the pastoral peoples who perform ritual activities related to stone platform. It would have a socioeconomic role among the people who practice of such activities.

== Classification ==
Megaliths can be classified in different way. Scholars use a different approach to categorize megaliths. Mostly megaliths can be classified based on their forms and styles of techniques of building. Lewis and Daniel classified megaliths into four different categories. But Fergusson classified them into five groups. These are Tumuli (small stone chambers, megalithic chambers), Dolmen (without tumuli), Circles (surrounding tumuli and dolmen; circle without tumuli), Avenues (stones circle and without the circle) and menhir (Single or in groups). The Megaliths can be classified in a distinct way. In Ethiopian megaliths are classified into three groups dolmens, tumuli, and stelae. Stelae in Gurage and Silti are classified based on the engravings. The first type consists of flat stelae which depicting daggers, arc, and geometric and human representations. The second type of stelae is anthropomorphic stelae. In this group human chest and reversed “X” and “W” and two circles are depicted. The third groups are cylindrical stelae. The height of these group ranges between 0.5m and 1.80m. The fourth types are Phallic stelae. These groups are few compared to others. Their height ranges between 60 cm and 1.80 m. and the fifth types are hemispherical and conical respectively.

In a few sites, there are symbols engraved on stelae seems to be similar. Compared to other decorated stelae are not many. But they exist in most stelae sites in the southern region. Still, symbolism in megaliths seems to be the most challenging and some of the symbols are hard to understand. Azais and Chambard believe that the signs drawn on stelae are "solar stars" and indication of worshiping the sun. Presumably, it is too early to draw into conclusion on symbolism. Sometimes distinct symbols exist at a single site. In general, the stelae of the south are either Anthropomorphic or Phallic.

Stelae of Gurage and Silti have the symbol of sword and other symbols. In Tiya, one of the world heritage sites, many stelae have an engraving of the sword. The symbol of the sword is interpreted identified as the rank of the warrior or the number of enemies killed. Still, the interpretation is dubious and debatable.

== Purpose ==
The purposes of megaliths differ from place to place. In some area's stelae had been used as territorial markers whereas in other areas peoples use them as burial markers It might have served as a burial mark, ceremonial center and ritual. The excavation conducted at Chalba-Tutiti (Gedeo Zone) shows that the use of stelae not only associated with burial. From Tuto-Fela, other stelae site in Gedeo zone site near to Chalba-Tutiti human remains and other associated materials were recovered. These two sites are in nearby areas and inhabited by the same ethnic groups. But the current settlement might be different from the past. Megaliths might have been used for multiple purposes. Megaliths of Turkana are the earliest in East Africa and the horn region, and are built for commemorative purpose. Stiles mentioned that these megaliths were built by the earliest pastoralist of East Africa. The peoples referred to as ‘Megalithic Cushites’.

== Emergence of megaliths ==
There were conflicting arguments about the origin of megalithic monuments in Europe. The megaliths believed to be built by a single group of people. Through time this argument was rejected, and Crete was considered as a center for the origin of megalithic monuments in Europe. However, the emergence of radiocarbon dating dismissed hypothesis which based on assumption. The megalithic tombs of Western Europe were proved to be older than that of the Crete. Megaliths emerged at a different time. Alinei, and Benozzo state that megalithic monuments first emerged in Celtic, and it spread to other areas. But Colin Renfrew proposes autonomous cultural development. Recently Paulsson dismissed the diffusionism about the origin and direction off megalithic in Europe. Erection of megaliths had a long history in many parts of the world. Several megalithic sites have been reported from North Africa, West Africa, East Africa, central Africa and the horn of Africa.

== Overview ==
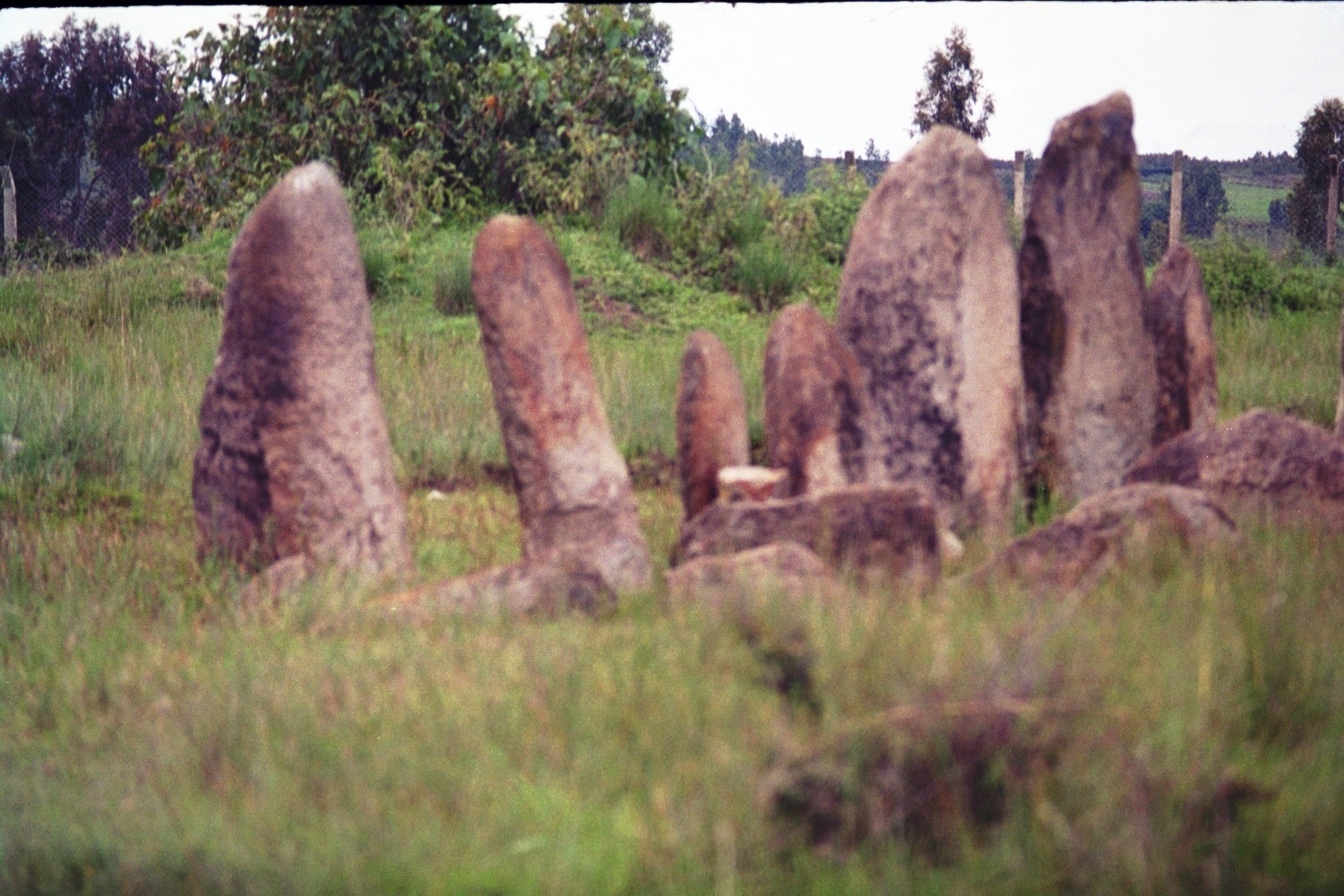
Tiya stelae

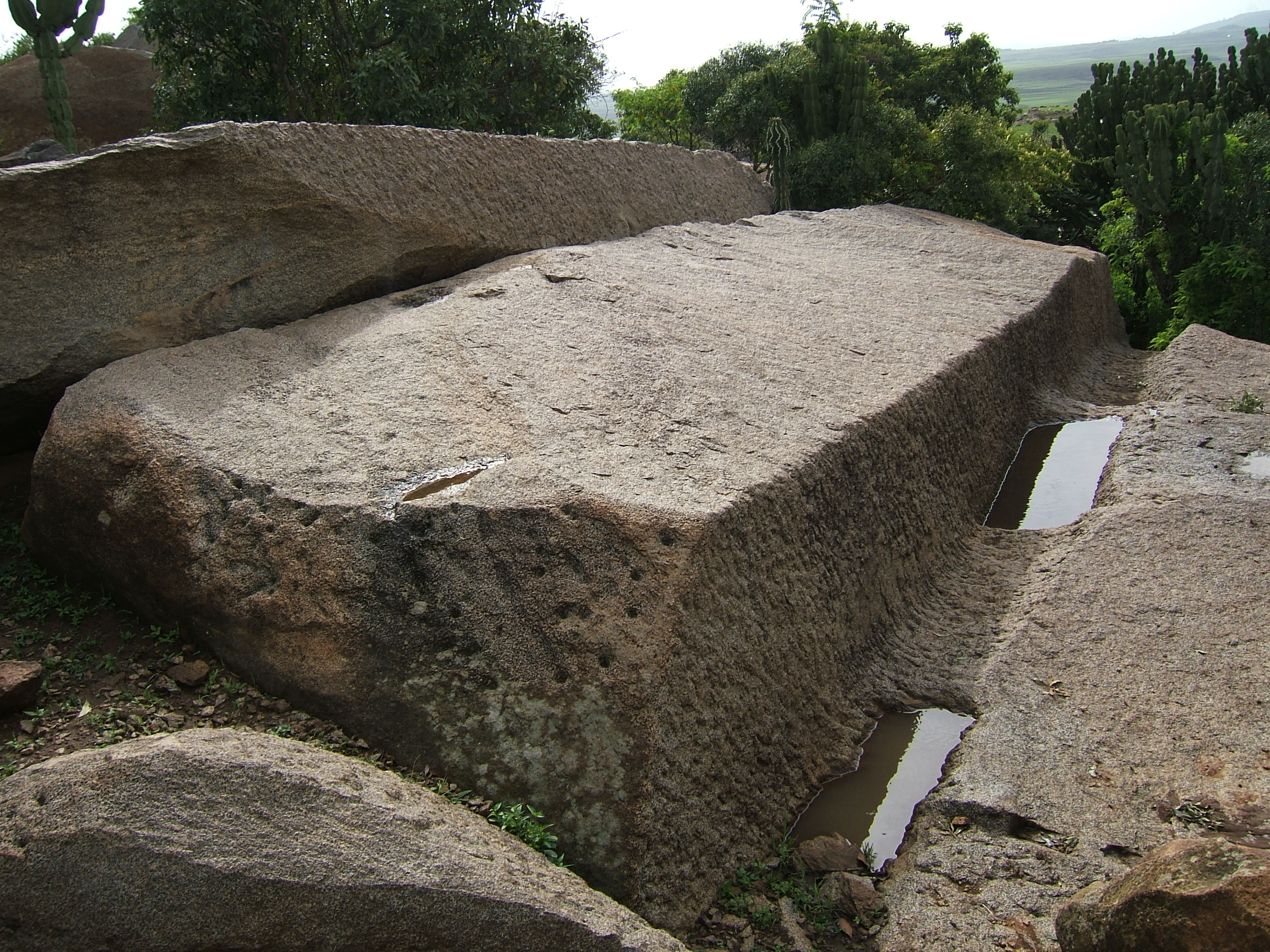
Aksum's stela quarry site

The existence of megaliths was reported in the 19th c by travelers and missionaries. Alfred Ilg and Jules Borelli had information about Tiya, one of the world heritage sites, in 1886. In 1905 F.J. Bieber had similar information about few megalithic sites south of Addis Ababa, Ethiopia's capital. In 1905 V. Chollet and H. Neuville visited Tiya, Sombo, and Seden megalithic sites. Currently, these sites are in Southern Nations, Nationalities and Peoples Regional State (SNNPRS). But studies on Ethiopian megaliths started in the 20thc. In the 1920s Azais and Chambard reported some megalithic sites from Gurage, Silti, Hadiya, Kambata, Gedeo, Sidama and other areas. Later they published their report in 1931. The report of V.Chollet and H. Neuville instigated many scholars and missionaries to visit the sites. In the meantime, many missionaries and travelers were curious about the megalithic culture. In 1932 Abbé Breuil wrote a letter to Azaïs which requests about any affinity with the megaliths of India could be an example for their curiosity. Also, in 1934 Jensen, the team from Frobenius Institute reported additional stelae sites in Gedeo. In 1939 some stelae from Gedeo were taken in Germany and still located in the Ethnological Museum of Frankfurt. Also, some stelae from Gurage were taken to Rome. Since then several megalithic sites are identified from different regions. Anfray listed about 150 stelae from Sodo, Maskan, Dobi and Silti area. He mentioned the presence of additional sites that would be investigated. Also 11 stelae sites were reported from Sodo and Mehur-Aklil. The nature and distribution of megaliths in Ethiopia vary from region to region. The types of megaliths in southern Ethiopia are different from megaliths of Eastern Ethiopia. Dolmens are the type of megaliths widely distributed in the Eastern part of the country. It is not common to identify dolmen in the central and southern regions of the country. The type of megaliths found in southern and central Ethiopia are Tumulus and stelae. Some Tumuli sites are reported Shewa (central Ethiopia) Gedeo and Borana zone (southern Ethiopia).

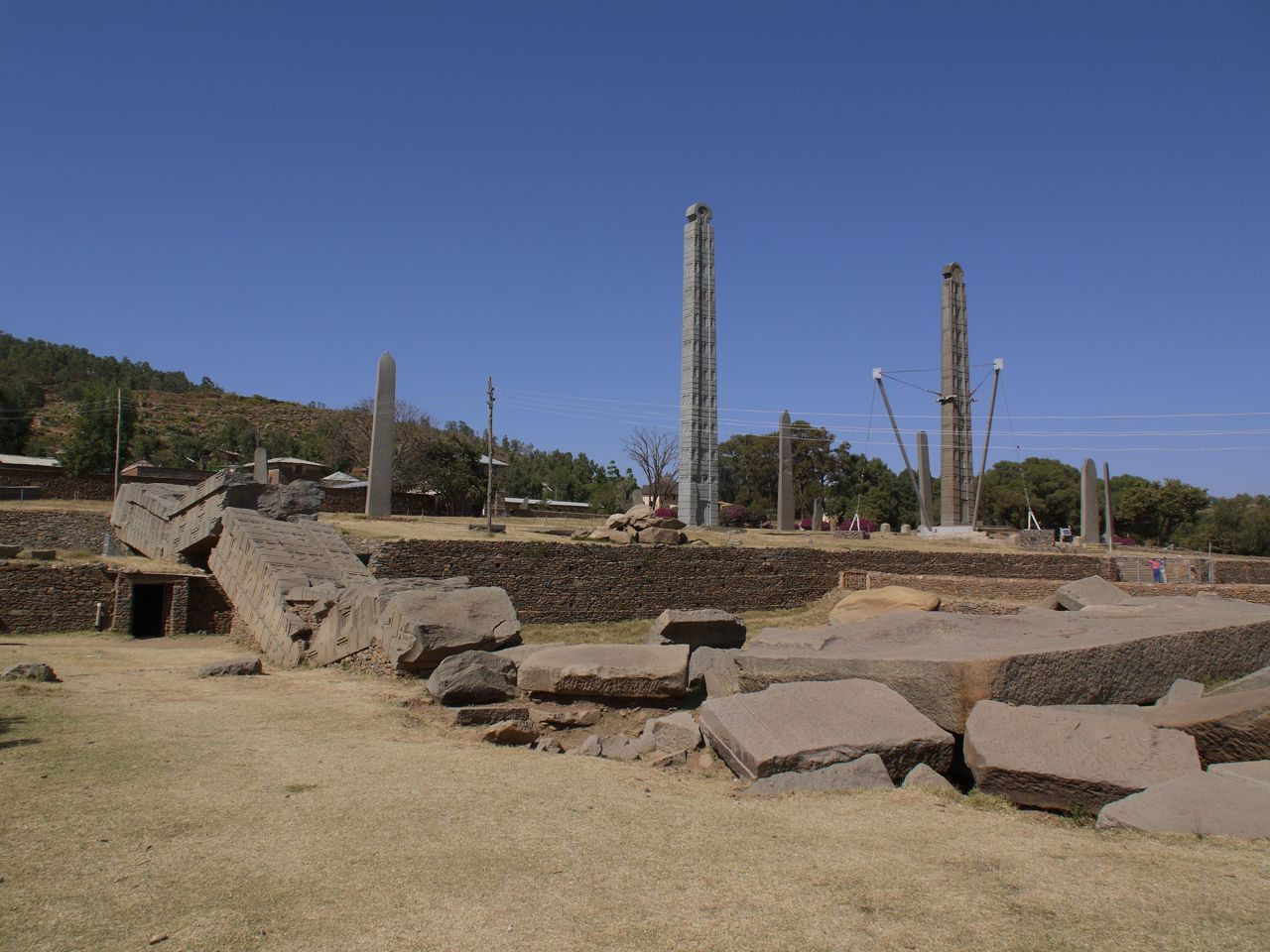
Aksum stelae

Stelae are a type of megaliths found in central, south and southwestern Ethiopia. Several stelae sites have been discovered in the southern part of Ethiopia. In the 1920s Azais studied some of the megalithic sites of located in Gedeo zones and Sidama zones. A significant number of stelae sites are identified in other areas of the southern region. Anfray and Joussaume reported several stelae sites from Gurage, Silti, Hadiya, Kambata and Wolayita. The total number of stelae in the southern region was estimated at ten thousand. The southern region is known for the huge concentration of megalithic culture. Due to this the region is referred to as “stelae belt”.

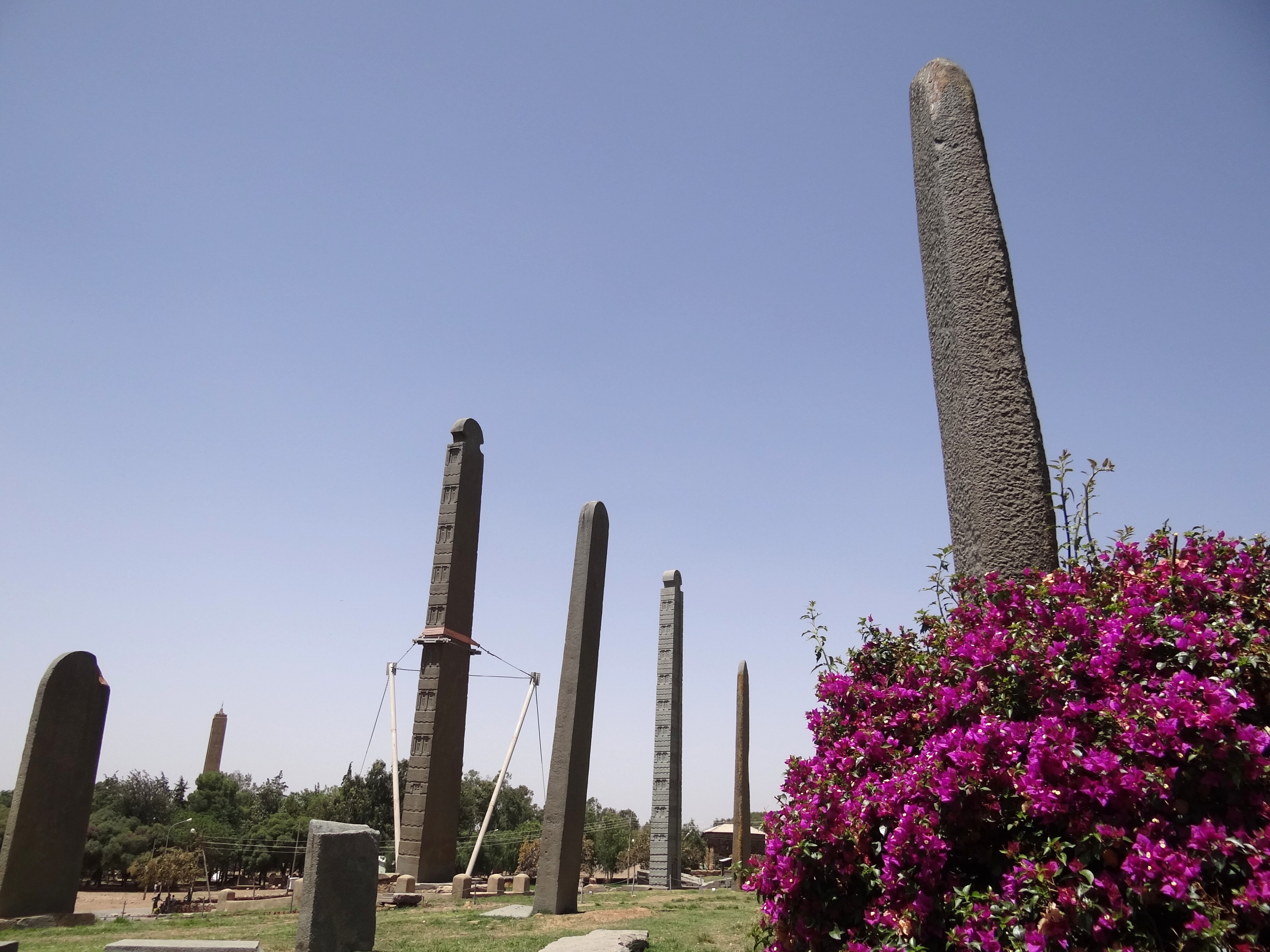
Axum's Northern Stelae Park.

Stelae also found in Aksum in northern Ethiopia. The Aksumite stelae are somehow different from other stelae. Aksumite stelae are part of Aksumite civilization and dated to 2nd and 4th century AD. Some of these stelae have an association with cemeteries. It is believed that dolmens and tumuli pre-date pre-Aksumite civilization.

Azais and Chambard conducted an excavation in Kibet, Gatir-Dama, Dimbo-Der, and Tiya in Gurage area. They recovered nothing from Kibet. But from Gatir-Dama, Human fossil and ceramics were recovered and is dated to 750 ± 110 BP. Dimbo-Der and Tiya human fossil had been recovered. They believe that Kibet might be stolen or destroyed. Gatira Dama). In Sodo and Sadden there exist 3000 and 200 burials were documented respectively. Mulicha, Gababa, Gayot Garno Harbo unspecified number of burial were reported.

== Hadiya and Kambata ==
Stelae sites of Hadiya and Kambata are few when compared to that of the Gurage area. Azais and Chambard in the 1920s, visited Shashogo, Kalisha. Later additional sites were listed by Anfray. Kunafa, Gora, Lafto-Lenka, Bishata, Bulula, Kalisha, Suta, Lisana-Kotancho, Lisana-kosa, Dishamo, Bidika, hirco, Kachara Eba, Ilfat, Danama, Wubara, Sike-Giorgis, Kutube-Jarso are stelae sites reported from Hadiaya. Leghe, Zogoba, Deketta, Bazena, and Bula are some of the sites reported from Kambata. But later in 1979 but Ambo-Kuna, Achira, Adjora, Oddo, Moggisa, Gabara, Bidika, Jarso, Lage and Kachare-Eba were added in Hadiya and Kambata area. 26 stelae were documented from 23 sites. Except for one site, all are phallic stelae. Their size ranges from 0.50 cm to 2.12 meters.

== Wolayita ==
In Wolayita Gurma, Ganame, Wachiga, Ofa, Sare Womba and around Sodo phallic stelae sites were identified. The stelae of these areas range between 55 cm and 2.30meters. In terms of size stelae of Wolayita are relatively larger than stelae identified in Hadiya and Kambata areas.

== Northern Shoa ==
Few stelae were reported to the north of Addis Ababa, at a district called Efrata and Gidim of Amhara Regional State, some 17 km west of the town Effesson. The local people name the stelae as‘Mushura Dingay’ (bride stone). 40 stelae were identified at this area. Some of them were standing, and the remaining were lying on the ground. The lying stelae were probably displaced from their original place. This site comprises both phallic and anthropomorphic stelae. The engraving of the stelae resembles with Tiya and Tutofela. Nothing is known about the purpose of these stelae because no detail research is done yet. The largest stela has 1.75meters with its circumference of 1.3meters, and the smallest stela is 0.76 meter.

The megalithic tradition exists in the northern part of Ethiopia. Some stone circles are identified in Amba Dero area. But there is scare information about megalithic culture in the northern part of Ethiopia. Fattovich mentioned that Aksum stelae as part of the development of regional megalithic culture. He believes that they are memorial monuments. Anfray did an inventory on already known and new sites in the region and from these sites they able to list only 13 sites. Research works on megalithism emerged in the 1970s but more relatively more research was started in Ethiopia and Djibouti in 1980s. Since the 1990s more organized and multidisciplinary studies are emerging in the region.

== South Omo ==
The megalithic culture in South Omo zone of the SNNPR (Southern Nation Nationalities and Peoples Regional State) is somehow distinct from the usually known megalithic culture in other parts of the country. These stone platforms are identified in Mursiland near to the River Omo. The platforms referred to benna kulugto by the local peoples. The stone structures are arranged like a concentric ring on the ground. The stones have different shape. Some stones have flat rectangular surfaces whereas the others are irregular boulders. Their size ranges from 2m to 26m diameter. These platforms assumed to be ceremonial centers which had been used by the Bodi, one of the pastoral peoples living along the Omo valley. Recently new site reported from Mursi area, at Dirikoro, near to Omo river, in Debub Omo Zone. The Mursi platforms were associated with pastoral adaptation to environmental challenge. The southern region is known from the megalithic culture. The similarity might not be only with signs and symbols engraved or drawn on stelae. Also, there is a striking inter-site similarity. Banko-Markos and Sakaro-Sodo stelae sites can be mentioned as an example of this inter-site similarity.

== Gedeo ==
Gedeo zone is known for the existence of several megalithic sites. Azais and Chambard, Jensen, Haberland, Anfray, Joussume, and many other scholars visited the megalithic sites of Gedeo. One of the early scholars, Azais and Chambard, led an expedition to Bale, Gedeo, and Sidama and listed 20 megalithic sites in these areas. Out of these sites, 16 sites were in Gedeo and Sidama. Later Anfray estimated the stelae of Gedeo about 10,000. Recently 45 megalithic sites were identified in Gedeo. Tutofela, Chalba-tutiti, Sakaro-Sodo and Sade-Markato some of the known sites from Gedeo.

== Sidama ==
Sidama is one of the zones in the region where several megalithic sites located. Anfray listed 303 in 26 sites in Sidama. These sites were found in 5 woredas and they are not far from the main road. In a total 71 stelae are standing from 16 sites. Most of the stelae were destroyed by human interference. From the listed sites Waheno, Amate, Aruje-Mogesha, Alamura, Futa’e, Gobadamo, and Makala have 68, 53, 22, 18, 26, 18 and 31 stelae respectively.

In Makala and Alamura most of the stelae are displaced from their original locations. But in Waheno, Aamate, Gobadamo and Aruja-Mogasha 48 stelae are standing. Dongora-Elmate, Masincho and Sabicha 11 are found in original locations. In the 1931 Azais and Chambard reported 82 stelae from Waheno. Now 68 stelae were reported and only 26 stelae still standing.

Waheno is a site where many stelae are located. The site is in Aleta-Wondo woreda, Homecho-Waheno kebele, Bora-Gento, and Lakola locality. The size of stelae in Waheno ranges from 1m-4.5m. It contains phallic and decorated stelae. In 1931Azais and Chambard conducted an excavation and they discovered polished stone, a fragment of pottery, obsidian, and fossil.

After the work of Francis Anfray, Matasabia reported additional megalithic sites from Sidama Zone. Wijigira and Santaro in Hawasa Zuria Woreda; Bonkaki in Arbegona woreda, and Hofa-Hamate in Hula (Hageresealm) Woreda. Shabe-Dela, Tula-Iracha, Babie-Kololcha, Bamisa and Setingela are some newly reported sites in Sidama. The other two site from Dara woreda were reported. These sites are Dela and Hamate which are located at Banko-Markos Kebele. At Dela 5 stelae were identified and one stela still standing. At Hamate 20 stelae identified and 6 are still standing. But Anfray listed 53 stelae from Hamate megalithic site.

Most of Sidama's megalithic sites are in Dara (the stelae of Daarra), Aleta-Chuko, Aleta-Wondo, Shabadino, and Hawasa Zuria woreda. The remaining sites are in Basa and Arbegona woreda. Two stelae sites are reported. The current conservation status of the sites is not known. Most of the sites were destroyed by human interference and only their names left in the documents. When it compared with early reports few sites are survived and most of these sites were under threat. Development activities and population pressure are one of the major challenges for these sites. Some of the stelae in Tuto Fela and Tiya were restored.

The research works on the megalithic monuments are limited. Only few stelae sites are dated in Gedeo and Gurage areas. In Gedeo, Sakaro Sodo stelae site is dated to 1st c AD. Tutofela is the first dated site in Gedeo and it lies between 11th to 12thc AD. The charcoal identified from Chalba-Tutiti is dated to 17th C. A single stelae from Sodit is dated to 7th -8th AD. Eric Godet dated Gattira-Demma a site in Gurage zone and it ranges between 12-13th c AD. The other dated site is Tiya also in Gurage zone. Tiya is dated to 11th to 13th c AD.

== See also ==
- Architecture of Ethiopia
