= Tiya (archaeological site) =

- Archaeological site
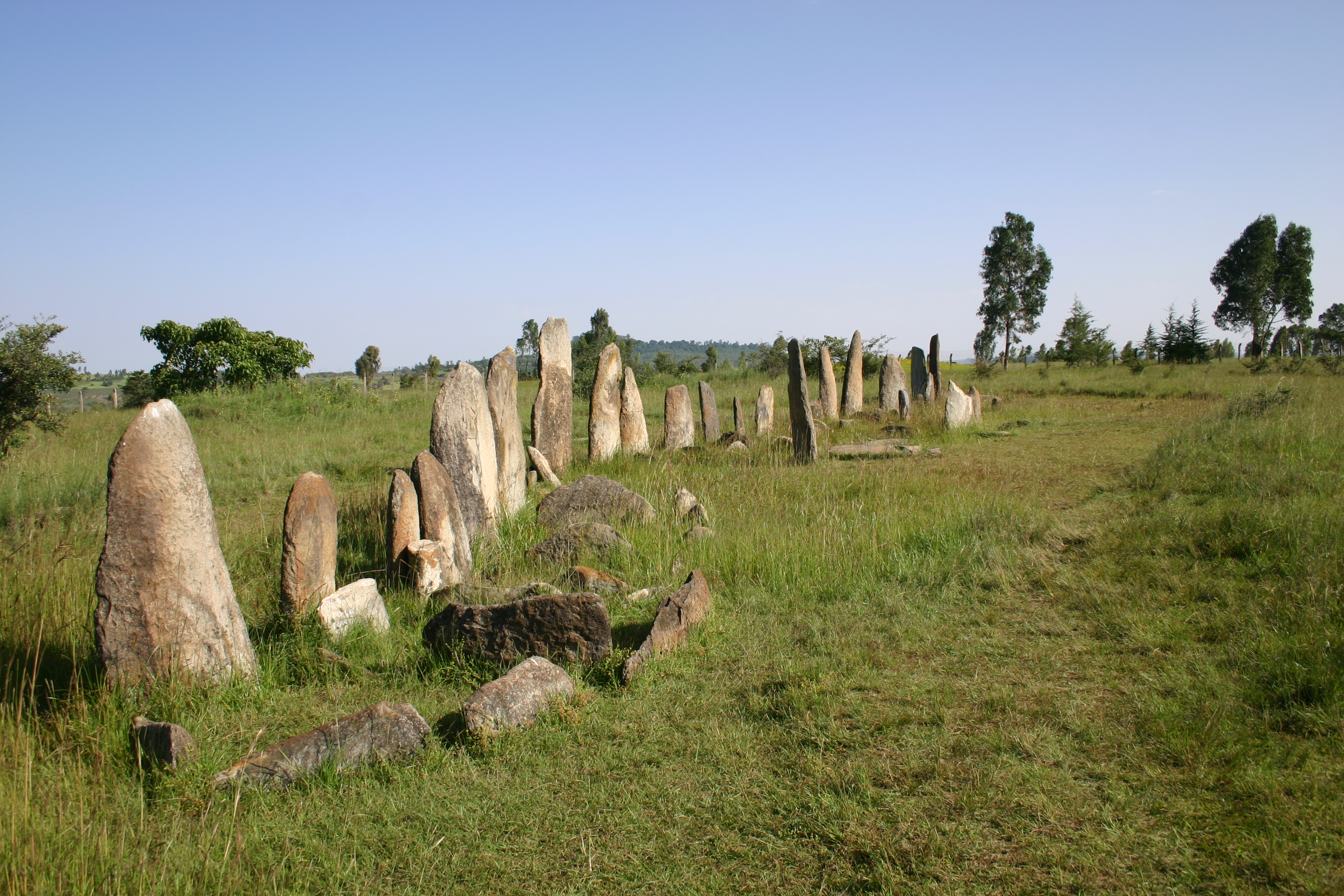

- Location in Ethiopia
- Coordinates: 8°26′N 38°37′E
- Country: Ethiopia
- Region: Southern Nations, Nationalities, and Peoples' Region
- Zone: Gurage

UNESCO World Heritage Site
- Official name: Tiya
- Type: Cultural
- Criteria: i, iv
- Designated: 1980 (4th session)
- Reference no.: 12
- Region: Africa

Tiya is an archaeological site in central Ethiopia. It is located in the Soddo woreda, in the Gurage Zone of the Southern Nations, Nationalities, and Peoples Region south of Addis Ababa. It is best known for its archaeological site its large stone pillars, many of which bear some form of decoration. The archeological site was designated a World Heritage Site in 1980, due to the unique nature of these monolithic monuments.

== Overview ==
According to Joussaume (1995), who led archaeological work at Tiya, the site is relatively recent. It was dated to a time period between the 11th and 13th centuries CE. Later dating places the stelae's construction some time between the 10th and 15th centuries CE. However, the building of megaliths in Ethiopia is a very ancient tradition, with many such monuments predating the Common Era.

The menhir or stelae at the site, "32 of which are engraved with enigmatic symbols, notably swords," likely mark a large, prehistoric burial complex. A German ethnographic expedition had visited the site in April 1935, and had found at one hour's journey to the south of the caravan camp the stone monoliths with sword symbol, which had been seen earlier by Neuville and Père Azaïs.

Surface finds at Tiya contained a selection of Middle Stone Age tools (MSA) that are technologically similar to tools found at Gademotta and Kulkuletti. Because of a unique production process that uses what are called “tranchet blows”, Tiya tools might also belong to the same time span as these other two sites. Additionally, archaeological excavations at Tiya have yielded tombs.

== Gurage stelae ==
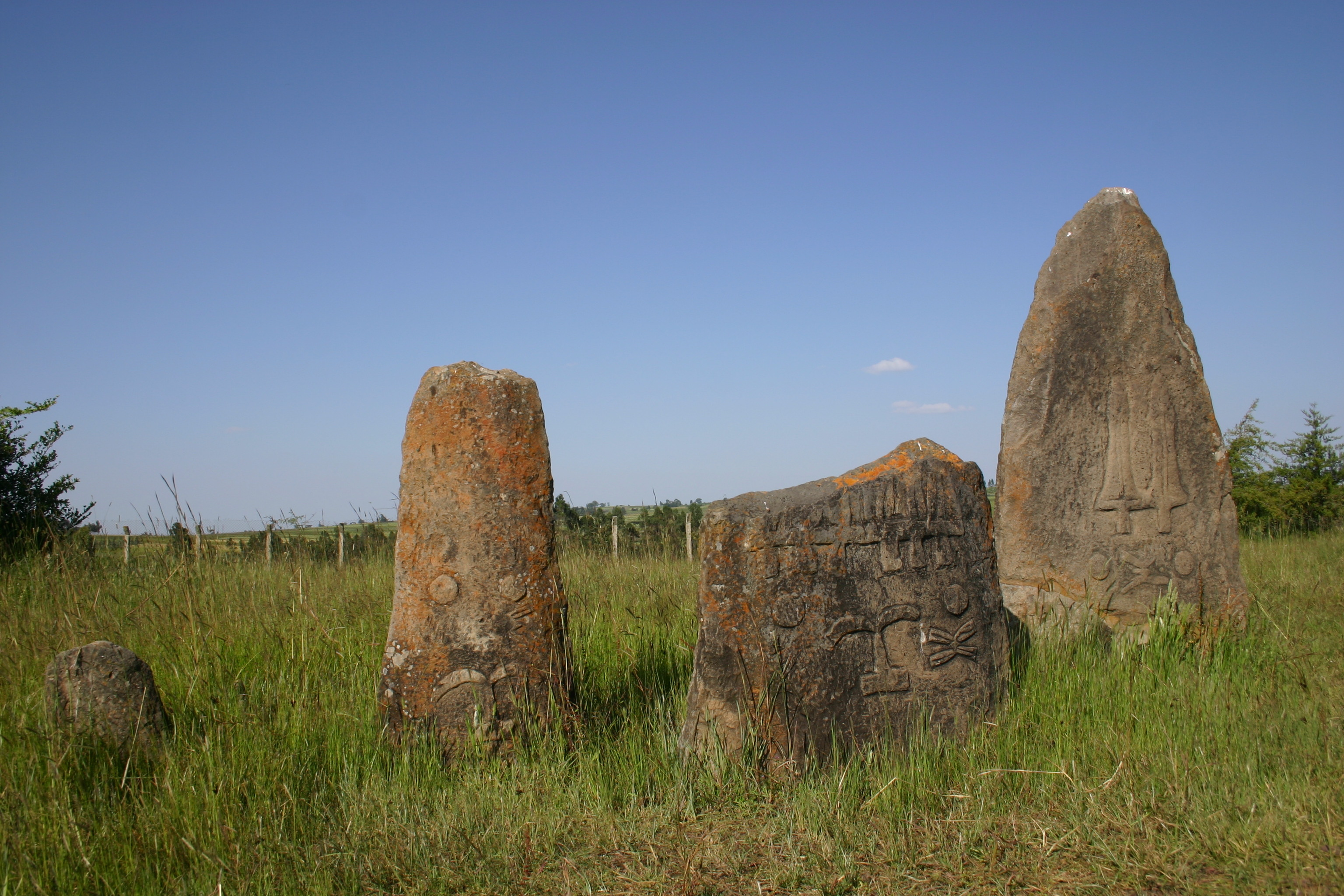
Megaliths with engraved figures in Tiya.

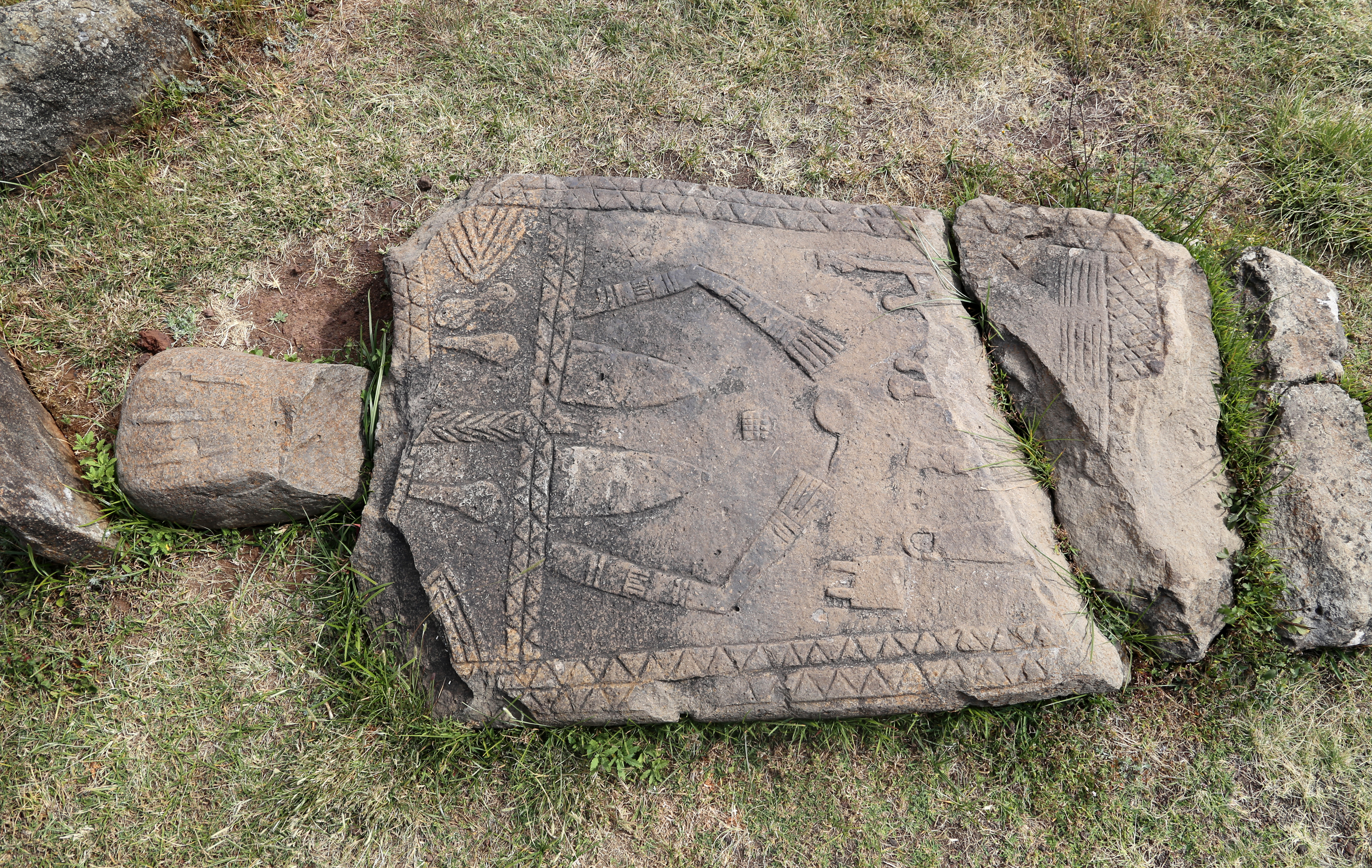
Anthropomorphic woman honorary stele, with breast

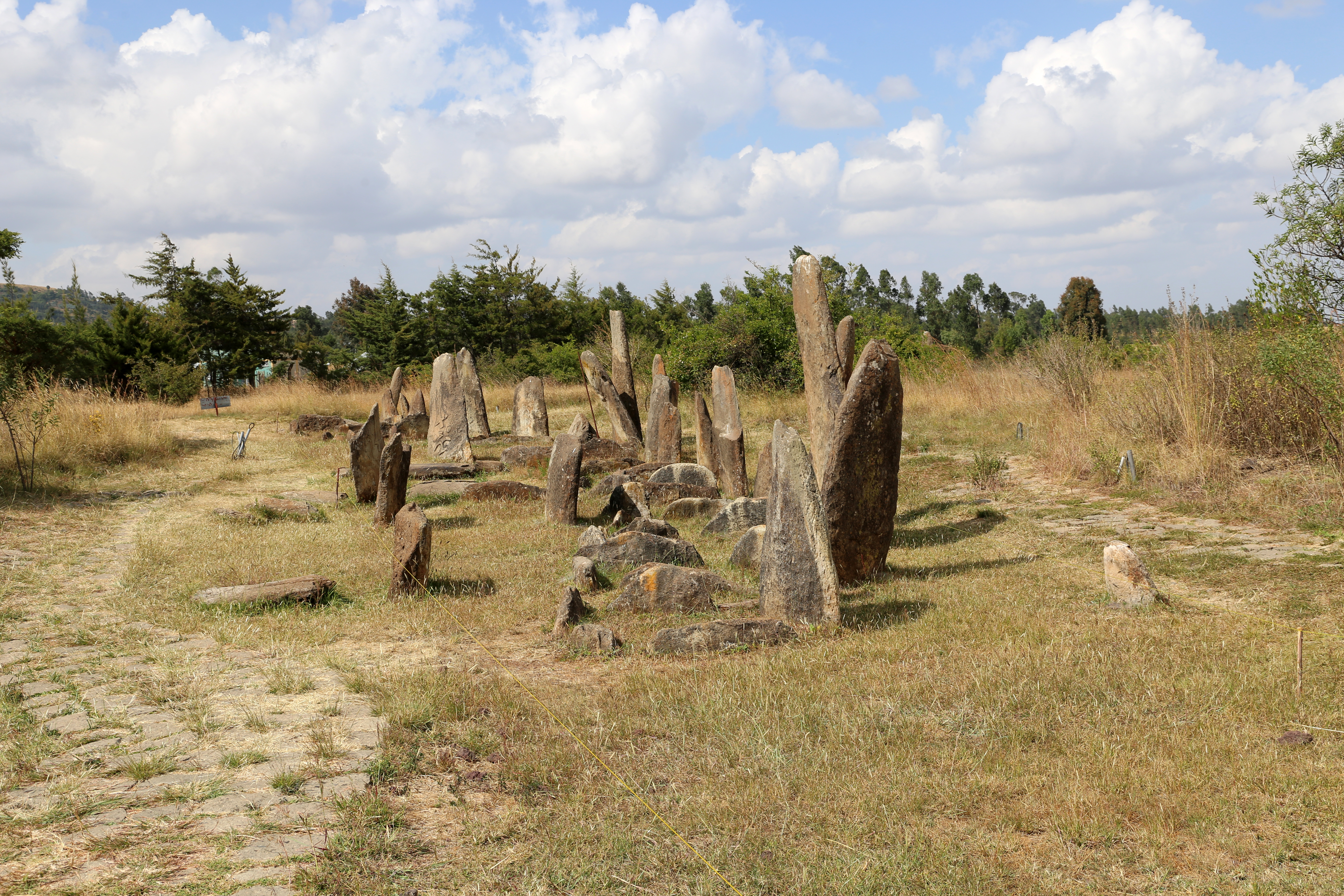
A megalithic stelae field in Tiya.

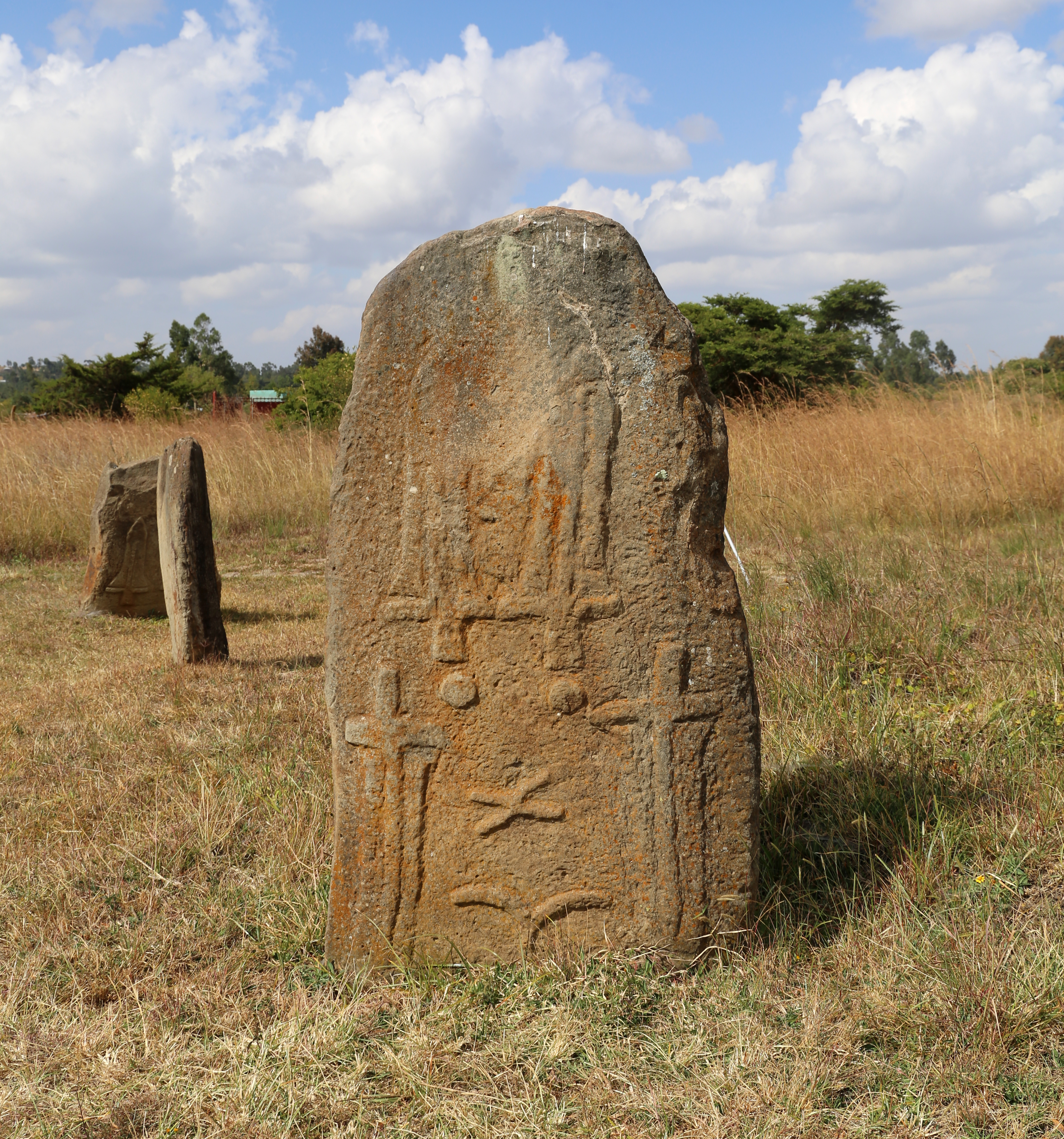
Man honorary stele, with swords

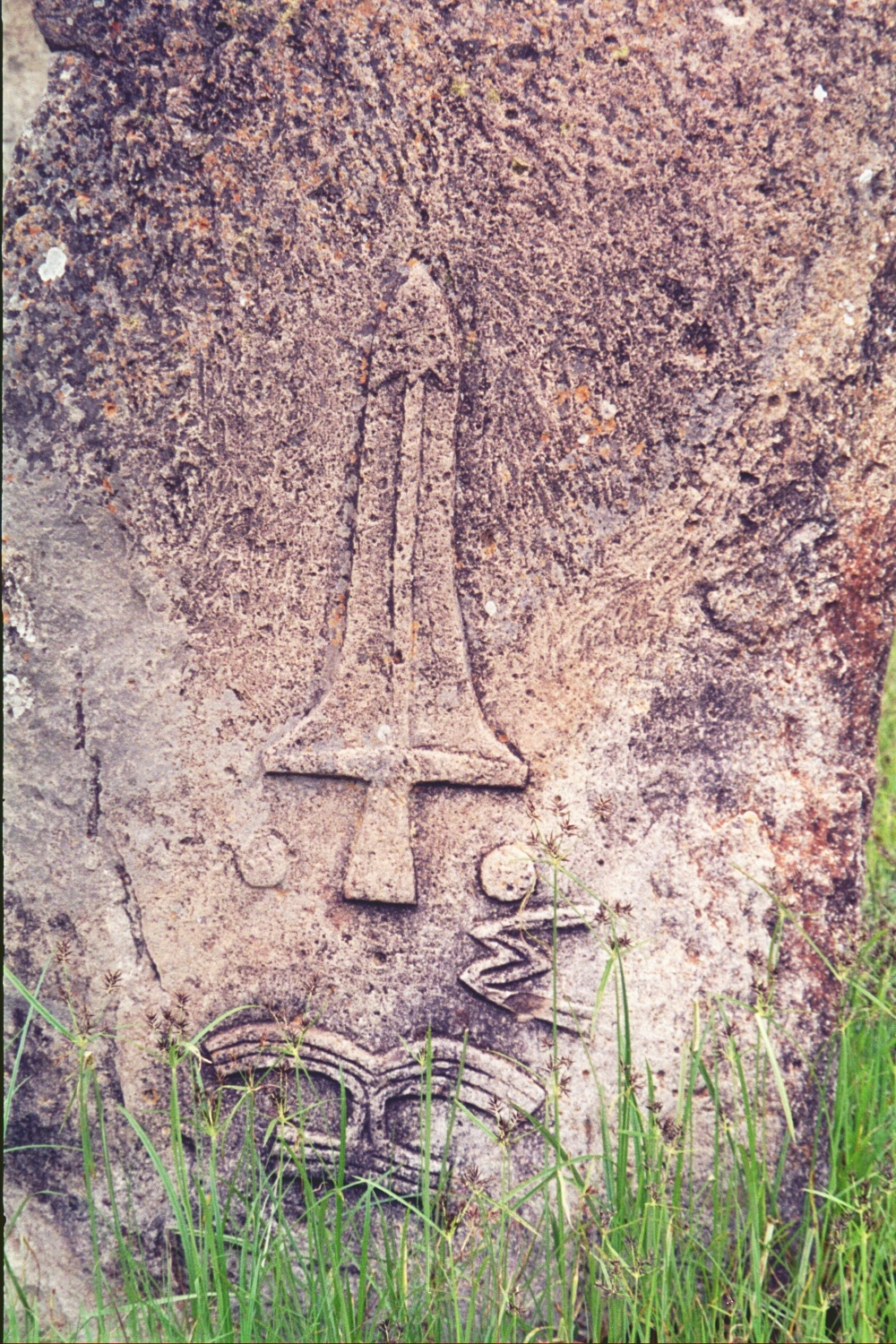
A sword symbol on a stele at Tiya.

Tiya is one of nine megalithic pillar sites in the Gurage Zone. As of 1997, 118 stelae were reported in the area. Along with the stelae in the Hadiya Zone, the structures have been identified by local residents as Yegragn Dingay or "Gran's stone", in reference to Ahmad ibn Ibrahim. Despite this, they were not made during his lifetime but centuries prior, and were simply attributed to him along with the Oromo due to the similarities in blade shapes. Like other Sidamo and Konso stele, historians have theorised they're of Aksumite origin or related through a common regional culture" to & "despite this, they were not made during his lifetime but centuries prior, and were simply attributed to him along with the Oromo due to the similarities in blade shapes.

The Gurage stelae are of three types: anthropomorphic stelae with human figures, phallic stelae, and stelae of neither anthropomorphic nor phallic type. The anthropomorphic and non-anthropomorphic/non-phallic stelae types are flat in shape, being the only stelae of this form in the southern region. Most of these stelae, including the 46 ones at Tiya, which are the largest of the bunch, also have distinctive, elaborate decorations. Among these designs are swords, plant-like symbols, and a standing human figure with arms akimbo. The plant and sword emblems can be found on the same stelae. In addition, the Tiya rock slabs also often feature a T-shaped symbol.

The stelae at Tiya and other areas in central Ethiopia are similar to those on the route between Djibouti City and Loyada in Djibouti. In the latter area, there are a number of anthropomorphic and phallic stelae, which are associated with graves of rectangular shape flanked by vertical slabs. The Djibouti-Loyada stelae are of uncertain age, and some of them are adorned with an analogous T-shaped emblem.

== Research ==
Little research has been done at Tiya, and there are several difficulties in understanding these types of sites from an archaeological standpoint. First, it is difficult to determine the identity of the megalith builders given just the megaliths themselves. Second, archaeologists have been preoccupied with reconstructing ethnic histories through oral historical accounts, yet these are unavailable or uninformative in many cases.

== See also ==
- Tiya (town)
