= Gumer =

District in Southern Nations, Nationalities, and Peoples' Region, Ethiopia

Coordinates: 7°55′N 38°05′E

Gumer (Amharic: ጉመር) is one of the woredas in the Southern Nations, Nationalities, and Peoples' Region of Ethiopia. This woreda is named after one of the sub-groups of the Sebat Bet Gurage, the Gumer. Part of the Gurage Zone, Gumer is bordered on the southeast by the Silt'e Zone, on the southwest by Geta, on the northwest by Cheha, and on the north by Ezha. Towns in Gumer include Arek'it and B'ole. Geta and Alicho Werero woredas were separated from Gumer.

Bodies of water in this woreda include Lake Arek'it, after which the town was named. Landmarks include Mugo Mountain, which is now part of silte zone azernet berbere woreda mugo kebele, which has two mosques built in the early 19th century on its summit, and is covered with dense forests of indigenous trees which include native species of fig, African olive, Afrocarpus gracilior, African juniper, and Cordia africana. The mountain also has strategic importance, having been used by the Italian army during the Italian occupation as a fortress. Mount Mugo is also the source of the Yo, Ayisechi and Balkech rivers. Gumer has 82 kilometers of all-weather roads and one kilometer of dry-weather roads, for an average road density of 231 kilometers per 1000 square kilometers.

== Demographics ==
Based on the 2007 Census conducted by the CSA, this woreda has a total population of 80,178, of whom 37,495 are men and 42,683 women; 2,923 or 3.65% of its population are urban dwellers. The majority of the inhabitants were reported as Muslim, with 59.98% of the population reporting that belief, while 29.81% practiced Ethiopian Orthodox Christianity, and 9.27% were Protestants.

The 1994 national census reported a total population for this woreda of 240,500 of whom 111,740 were men and 128,760 were women; 2,574 or 1.07% of its population were urban dwellers. The two largest ethnic groups reported in Gumer were the Sebat Bet Gurage (58.17%), and the Silte (41.22%); all other ethnic groups made up 0.61% of the population. Sebat Bet Gurage was spoken as a first language by 42.94%, 32.99% Silte, and 0.55% spoke Amharic; the remaining 23.52% spoke all other primary languages reported. The majority of the inhabitants were Muslim, with 80.35% of the population reporting that belief, while 16.15% practiced Ethiopian Orthodox Christianity, 2.79% were Protestants, and 0.62% Catholic. Concerning education, 20.06% of the population were considered literate, which is about the same as the Zone average of 20.62%; 13.24% of children aged 7–12 were in primary school, 1.94% of the children aged 13–14 were in junior secondary school, and 4.19% of the inhabitants aged 15–18 were in senior secondary school. Concerning sanitary conditions, 38.14% of the urban houses and 9.41% of all houses had access to safe drinking water at the time of the census; 18.98% of the urban and 7.54% of all houses had toilet facilities.
