= Geta (woreda) =

District in Southern Nations, Nationalities, and Peoples' Region, Ethiopia

Geta is one of the woredas in the Southern Nations, Nationalities, and Peoples' Region of Ethiopia. Geta is one of the sub-groups of the Sebat Bet Gurage. Part of the Gurage Zone, the Geta woreda is bordered on the south by the Siltʼe Zone, on the southwest by Endegagn, on the west by Enemorina Eaner, on the north by Cheha, and on the northeast by Gumer. Geta was separated from the Gumer woreda.

== Demographics ==
Based on the 2007 Census conducted by the CSA, this woreda has a total population of 69,455, of whom 33,020 are men and 36,435 women. The majority of the inhabitants were reported as Muslim, with 77.6% of the population reporting that belief, while 17.19% practiced Ethiopian Orthodox Christianity, and 4.26% were Protestants.
