= Misraq Azernet Berbere =

East Azarnat Berbere (Silt'e: ሸርቅ አዘርነት በርበሬ ወረደ/Sharq Azarinat Barbare Warada) is one of the woredas in the Southern Nations, Nationalities, and Peoples' Region of Ethiopia. This woreda is named after the sub-groups of the Silt'e people. Part of the Silt'e Zone, East Azernet Berbere is bordered on the south by the Hadiya Zone, on the west by Mirab Azernet Berbere, on the northwest by the Gurage Zone, on the northeast by Alicho Werero, and on the east by Wulbareg. It was part of Limo woreda.

== Demographics ==
Based on the 2007 Census conducted by the CSA, this woreda has a total population of 50,739, of whom 22,890 are men and 27,849 women; none of its population are urban dwellers. The majority of the inhabitants were Muslim, with 99.65% of the population reporting that belief.
