= Cheha =

District in Southern Nations, Nationalities, and Peoples' Region, Ethiopia

Coordinates: 8°10′N 37°45′E

Cheha is one of the woredas in the Southern Nations, Nationalities, and Peoples' Region of Ethiopia. This woreda is named after one of the sub-groups of the Sebat Bet Gurage, the Cheha. Part of the Gurage Zone, Cheha is bordered on the south by Enemorina Eaner, on the west by the Oromia Region, on the north by the Wabe River which separates it from Abeshge and Kebena, on the east by Ezha, and on the southeast by Gumer and Geta. The administrative center for Cheha is Endibir; other towns include Gubre.

Elevations in this woreda range from 1900 to 3000 meters. Rivers include the Gotam, Gogeb, and Metrekat. Local points of interest include the Acho Falls on the Wabe river which is 60 meters in height, and Gotam Falls on Gotam River near Emdibir Senior Secondary School which is between 50 and 60 meters in height. An all-weather road was built in 1963 which connects Emdibir north to Addis Ababa, and south to Hosaena by way of Welkite. The subsistence agriculture in Cheha is primarily based on enset, together with corn, sorghum and chickpea, as well as some annual root crops like yams and taro. Important cash crops include teff and Niger seed.

Cheha has 87 kilometers of all-weather roads and 49 kilometers of dry-weather roads, for an average road density of 237 kilometers per 1000 square kilometers.

== Demographics ==
Based on the 2007 Census conducted by the CSA, this woreda has a total population of 115,951, of whom 56,851 are men and 59,100 women; 8,992 or 7.76% of its population are urban dwellers. The plurality of the inhabitants were reported as Muslim, with 42.98% of the population reporting that belief, while 36.31% practiced Ethiopian Orthodox Christianity, 12.87% were Protestants, and 7.73% were Roman Catholics.

The 1994 national census reported a total population for this woreda of 115,864 of whom 56,740 were males and 59,444 were females; 3,693 or 3.19% of its population were urban dwellers. The largest ethnic group reported in Cheha, who were almost the only one in this woreda, were the Sebat Bet Gurage (99.23%); all other ethnic groups made up 0.77% of the population. Sebat Bet Gurage was spoken as a first language by 97.91% of the population, and 1.65% spoke Amharic; the remaining 0.44% spoke all other primary languages reported. The plurality of the inhabitants were Muslim, with 44.17% of the population reporting they practiced that belief, while 41.71% practiced Ethiopian Orthodox Christianity, 8.31% were Catholic, and 5.42% were Protestants. Concerning education, 29.33% of the population were considered literate, which is more than the Zone average of 20.62%; 20.47% of children aged 7–12 were in primary school, 5.28% of the children aged 13–14 were in junior secondary school, and 6.67% of the inhabitants aged 15–18 were in senior secondary school. Concerning sanitary conditions, 97.22% of the urban houses and 23.32% of all houses had access to safe drinking water at the time of the census; 44.12% of the urban and 10.63% of all houses had toilet facilities.
