= Enemorina Eaner =

District in Southern Nations, Nationalities, and Peoples' Region, Ethiopia

Coordinates: 8°00′N 37°40′E

Enemorina Eaner ("Enemor and Eaner") is one of the woredas in the Southern Nations, Nationalities, and Peoples' Region of Ethiopia. This woreda is named in part after one of the sub-groups of the Sebat Bet Gurage, the Enemor, who are first mentioned in a list of groups paying tribute to Emperor Yeshaq I, and other sub-group, Eaner. Part of the Gurage Zone, Enemorina Eaner is bordered on the south by the Hadiya Zone, on the southwest by Yem special woreda, on the west by Oromia Region, on the north by Cheha, on the east by Geta, and on the southeast by Endegagn. The administrative center of Enemorina Eaner is Gunchire. Endegagn was separated from this woreda.

Local landmarks include Ener Emanuel monastery, which was founded by a regional governor (balabat) named Aba Gada Agallo during the reign of Emperor Menelik II. It is located 59 kilometers from Welkite. Aba Geda agallo, who was a governor of significant part of Gurage during the reign of Emperor Menelik II, was one of the most influential personalities in the Southern Ethiopia.

== Demographics ==
Based on the 2007 Census conducted by the CSA, this woreda has a total population of 167,770, of whom 79,251 are men and 88,519 women; 6,590 or 3.93% of its population are urban dwellers. The majority of the inhabitants were reported as Muslim, with 61.26% of the population reporting that belief, while 30.13% practiced Ethiopian Orthodox Christianity, 7.39% were Protestants, and 1.1% were Catholics.

The 1994 national census reported a total population for this woreda of 196,455 of whom 92,348 were men and 104,107 were women; 1,706 or 0.87% of its population were urban dwellers. The five largest ethnic groups reported in Enemorina Eaner were the Sebat Bet Gurage (80.86%), the Soddo Gurage (15.84%), the Silt'e (1.93%), the Hadiya (0.57%) and the Amhara (0.37%); all other ethnic groups made up 0.43% of the population. Sebat Bet Gurage is spoken as a first language by 80.45%, 16.21% Soddo Gurage, 2.18% speak Silte, and 0.63% speak Amharic; the remaining 0.53% spoke all other primary languages reported. The majority of the inhabitants were Muslim, with 54.02% of the population reporting they practiced that belief, while 41.93% practiced Ethiopian Orthodox Christianity, 2.41% were Protestants, and 1.13% Catholic. Concerning education, 19.79% of the population were considered literate, which is less than the Zone average of 20.62%; 11.43% of children aged 7–12 were in primary school, 2.06% of the children aged 13–14 were in junior secondary school, and 1.3% of the inhabitants aged 15–18 were in senior secondary school. Concerning sanitary conditions, 34.87% of the urban houses and 6.06% of all houses had access to safe drinking water at the time of the census; 35.1% of the urban and 2.67% of all houses had toilet facilities.
