= Ezhana Wolene =

Former district in central Ethiopia

Coordinates: 8°10′N 38°05′E

Welene ("Welene") was one of the 7 Zones in the Central Ethiopia Region of Ethiopia. This woreda was named after two of the sub-groups of the Sebat Bet Gurage, the silte and the Wolene-Worriro. Part of the Gurage Zone, Silte Wolene was bordered on the south by Muhor, on the west by Sodo, on the north by Goro, on the northeast by Oromo, and on the east by Meskanena Mareko. The major town in Site Welene was Agenda. It was divided for Welene and Silte zones.

== Overview ==
Bodies of water in this woreda include Lake Bozebar, which is 10 hectares in area. Local landmarks include Trer Falls which is 70 meters in height and is located 2 kilometers from Agenda, Fokra Falls which is 30 meters in height and 10 kilometers from Agenda, and Muhur Eyesus monastery which according to tradition was founded by Abba Zena Markos during the reign of Emperor Yekuno Amlak.

The completion of a potable water improvement project in this woreda was announced 19 December 2006. Costing over 230,000 Birr, contributed jointly by the Ethiopian and Chinese governments, the project is expected to benefit the inhabitants of three rural kebeles.

== Demographics ==
Based on figures published by the Central Statistical Agency in 2005, this woreda has an estimated total population of 232,220, of whom 121,703 are men and 110,517 are women; 4,569 or 1.97% of its population are urban dwellers, which is less than the zone average of 6.3%. With an estimated area of 815.63 square kilometers, Ezhana Wolene has an estimated population density of 284.7 people per square kilometer, which is greater than the Zone average of 278.3.

The 1994 national census reported a total population for this woreda of 164,126 of whom 78,126 were men and 86,000 were women; 2,522 or 1.54% of its population were urban dwellers. The four largest ethnic groups reported in Ezhana Wolene were the Sebat Bet Gurage (97.21%), the Silte (1.18%), the Kebena (0.92%), and the Amhara (0.48%); all other ethnic groups made up 0.21% of the population. Sebat Bet Gurage is spoken as a first language by 97.27% of the population, 1.16% Silte, 0.94% speak Kebena, and 0.49% speak Amharic; the remaining 0.14% spoke all other primary languages reported. The majority of the inhabitants observed Ethiopian Orthodox Christianity, with 70.85% of the population reporting they practiced that belief, while 27.93% were Muslim, and 0.66% were Protestants. Concerning education, 24.76% of the population were considered literate, which is more than the Zone average of 20.62%; 19.06% of children aged 7–12 were in primary school, 3.19% of the children aged 13–14 were in junior secondary school, and 2.81% of the inhabitants aged 15–18 were in senior secondary school. Concerning sanitary conditions, 12.96% of the urban houses and 8.08% of all houses had access to safe drinking water at the time of the census; 15.23% of the urban and 1.9% of all houses had toilet facilities.
