= Lanfro =

Administrative subdivision of Ethiopia

Coordinates: 7°45′N 38°25′E

Lanfro is one of the woredas in the Southern Nations, Nationalities, and Peoples' Region of Ethiopia. Until it was included into the Silte Zone, Lanfro formed part of the Gurage Zone. Lanfro is bordered on the south by the Alaba special woreda, on the southwest by Sankurra, on the west by Dalocha, on the north by Silte, and on the east by the Oromia Region. The major town in Lanfro is Tora.

== Overview ==
Cash crops in Lanfro include pepper, which accounts for up to 60% of the cash income for many households, and teff. Butter is also an important income source, which can account for as much as 10% of the income for poor households. This woreda has 7 kilometers of all-weather roads and 3 kilometers of dry-weather roads, for an average road density of 19 kilometers per 1000 square kilometers.

== Demographics ==
Based on the 2007 Census conducted by the CSA, this woreda has a total population of 116,114, of whom 58,848 are men and 57,266 women; 12,457 or 10.71% of its population are urban dwellers. The majority of the inhabitants were Muslim, with 97.62% of the population reporting that belief, and 1.93% practiced Ethiopian Orthodox Christianity.

The 1994 national census reported a total population for this woreda of 80,072 of whom 40,145 were males and 39,927 were females; 5,096 or 6.36% of its population were urban dwellers. The three largest ethnic groups reported in Lanfro were the Silte (89.92%), the Alaba (7.1%), and the Amhara (1.46%); all other ethnic groups made up 1.52% of the population. Silte was spoken as a first language by 89.98%, 7.05% Alaba, and 1.82% spoke Amharic; the remaining 1.15% spoke all other primary languages reported. 97.57% of the population said they were Muslim, and 2.32% practiced Ethiopian Orthodox Christianity. Concerning education, 10.41% of the population were considered literate, which is less than the Zone average of 20.62%. Concerning sanitary conditions, 64.65% of the urban houses and 9.81% of all houses had access to safe drinking water at the time of the census; 27.93% of the urban and 4.11% of all houses had toilet facilities.
