= Silte (woreda) =

Coordinates: 7°55′N 38°20′E

Silti (ስልጢ) is one of the zones in the Central Ethiopia Regional State of Ethiopia. It is named after a subgroup of the Silt'e people, whose homeland includes this zone. Formerly part of the Gurage Zone, after a referendum held between 18 and 26 April 2001, this woreda became part of the Silt'e Zone. This woreda is bordered on the south by Lanfro and Dalocha, on the southwest by Wulbareg, on the west by Alicho Werero, on the north by the Gurage Zone, and on the east by the Oromia Region. The administrative center of this woreda is Kibet; other towns in Silti include Alkaso, and Werabe. Southwestern part of this woreda was added to Wulbareg woreda.

Silti has 47 kilometers of all-weather roads and 20 kilometers of dry-weather roads, for an average road density of 133 kilometers per 1000 square kilometers. Local landmarks include the Asano Stele, located 8 kilometers from Kibet. This stele has a flat shape with a height of about 1.5 meters and a width of 80 centimeters. Both sides of the Asano Stele are carved, but its head has been broken off. According to village elders, the place where this monument stands was formerly used as a burial ground.

== Demographics ==
Based on the 2007 Census conducted by the CSA, this zone has a total population of 177,249, of whom 87,600 are men and 89,649 women; 16,186 or 9.13% of its population are urban dwellers. The majority of the inhabitants were Muslim, with 98.02% of the population reporting that belief, while 0.8% practiced Ethiopian Orthodox Christianity.

The 1994 national census reported a total population for this zone of 117,784 of whom 57,510 were men and 60,274 women; 4,741 or 4.03% of its population were urban dwellers. The two largest ethnic groups reported in Silte were the Silt'e (98.22%), and the Amhara (0.88%); all other ethnic groups made up 0.87% of the population. Silt'e is spoken as a first language by 98.22%, and 0.91% speak Amharic; the remaining 0.87% spoke all other primary languages reported. The majority of the inhabitants said they were Muslim, with 98.2% of the population reporting that faith, while 0.8% practiced Ethiopian Orthodox Christianity. Concerning education, 16.61% of the population were considered literate, which is less than the Zone average of 20.62%; 3.54% of children aged 7–12 were in primary school, 0.56% of the children aged 13–14 were in junior secondary school, and 1.99% of the inhabitants aged 15–18 were in senior secondary school. Concerning sanitary conditions, 66.93% of the urban houses and 7.69% of all houses had access to safe drinking water at the time of the census; 35.96% of the urban and 4.37% of all houses had toilet facilities.
