= Mito (district) =

District in Central Ethiopia

- District
- Interactive map of Mito
- Country: Ethiopia
- Region: Central Ethiopia Regional State
- Zone: Silt'e
- Seat: Mito

.

Mito is a district in Ethiopia. The district is one of ten districts in Silt'e Zone of Central Ethiopia Regional State. The district is one of main areas of agricultural products in Ethiopia and known for its fertile soil and favorable climate for agriculture. The Koshe-Mito-Worabe asphalt road that connects Mito district to Mareko special woreda, is one of the roads that connects the district to other parts of Ethiopia.
