= Meskane =

Meskan is one of the woredas in the Southern Nations, Nationalities, and Peoples' Region of Ethiopia. This woreda is named after the Meskan speaking Gurage people. Part of the Gurage Zone, Meskane is bordered on the south by the Silt'e Zone, on the west by Muhor Na Aklil, on the northwest by Kokir Gedebanoon the north by sodo wereda, on the northeast by Sodo and Oromia, and on the southeast by Mareko. Towns in Meskane include Inseno. The town of Butajira is the capital town of Meskane. Meskane was part of the former Meskanena Mareko woreda.

Near Butajira are the Tufta Swamps at 8°8′N 38°24′E, located in the Western highlands near the headwaters of the Meki River. Mesqan Community, the subject of this study, is a member of the Gurages who are settled in south west of Ethiopia in the Southern Nations, Nationalities and Peoples Region. With an estimated population of 1.9 million, the Gurages are settled in a specific geographic location currently known as the Gurage Zone, which is further divided into 13 lower administrative units comprising eleven woredas and two town administrations. The Mesqan Community is settled in Mesqan Woreda and Buttajira Town Administration . The combined current population of Mesqan Woreda and Buttajira Town is 225,931, of which the Mesqan ethnic group constitutes the majority. Compared to the Sebat Bet and Kestane Gurage ethnic groups, migration to other parts of Ethiopia is less common among the Mesqans. Less than five per cent of the total population is believed to have migrated to urban towns in Ethiopia. The relative abundance of fertile land and suitable agricultural climate could be cited as discouraging factors for migration in past.

== Demographics ==
Based on the 2007 Census conducted by the CSA, this woreda has a total population of 155,782, of whom 76,396 are men and 79,386 women; 11,388 or 7.31% of its population are urban dwellers. The majority of the inhabitants were reported as Muslim, with 60.19% of the population reporting that belief, while 34.55% practice Ethiopian Orthodox Christianity, and 4.7% were Protestants.
