= East Meskan =

District in Central Ethiopia

- District
- Country: Ethiopia
- Region: Central Ethiopia Regional State
- Zone: East Gurage Zone
- Seat: Enseno

East Meskan, (Amharic: ምስራቅ መስቃን) is a district in Ethiopia. The district is one of four districts in East Gurage Zone of Central Ethiopia Regional State.

== History ==
East Meskan was a part of Gurage Zone until 2022, and was one of the four districts and one city administration that voted to establish the East Gurage Zone in protest against the decision of the Gurage Zone to become a separate regional state.
