= Mirab Azernet Berbere =

Mirab Azernet Berbere is one of the woredas in the Southern Nations, Nationalities, and Peoples' Region of Ethiopia. This woreda is named after the sub-groups of the Silt'e people. Part of the Silt'e Zone, Mirab Azernet Berbere is bordered on the southwest by the Hadiya Zone, on the northwest by the Gurage Zone, and on the east by Misraq Azernet Berbere. It was part of Limo woreda.

== Demographics ==
Based on the 2007 Census conducted by the CSA, this woreda has a total population of 59,289, of whom 27,011 are men and 32,278 women; 5,034 or 8.49% of its population are urban dwellers. The majority of the inhabitants were Muslim, with 96.57% of the population reporting that belief, while 2.81% practiced Ethiopian Orthodox Christianity.
