= Alicho Werero =

District in Ethiopia

- District
- Location in Ethiopia
- Coordinates: 8°00′N 38°12′E
- Country: Ethiopia
- Regional State: Southern Nations, Nationalities, and Peoples

Alicho Werero is one of the woredas in the Southern Nations, Nationalities, and Peoples' Region of Ethiopia. This woreda is named after the sub-groups of the Silt'e people. Part of the Silt'e Zone, Alicho Werero is bordered on the south by Wulbareg, on the southwest by Misraq Azernet Berbere, on the west and north by the Gurage Zone, and on the east by Silte. It was part of Gumer woreda.

== Demographics ==
Based on the 2007 Census conducted by the CSA, this woreda has a total population of 92,483, of whom 42,035 are men and 50,448 women; 783 or 0.85% of its population are urban dwellers. The majority of the inhabitants were Muslim, with 99.16% of the population reporting that belief.
