= Dalocha (woreda) =

Dalocha is one of the woredas in the Southern Nations, Nationalities, and Peoples' Region of Ethiopia. Part of the Silt'e Zone, Dalocha is bordered on the south by Sankurra, on the west by Wulbareg, on the north by Silte, and on the east by Lanfro. Towns in Dalocha include Dalocha. Western part of Dalocha was used to create Wulbareg woreda.

Dalocha has 32 kilometers of all-weather roads and 36 kilometers of dry-weather roads, for an average road density of 98 kilometers per 1000 square kilometers.

== Demographics ==
Based on the 2007 Census conducted by the CSA, this woreda has a total population of 89,807, of whom 44,960 are men and 44,847 women; 6,793 or 7.56% of its population are urban dwellers. The majority of the inhabitants were Muslim, with 98.07% of the population reporting that belief, while 1.64% practiced Ethiopian Orthodox Christianity.

The 1994 national census reported a total population for this woreda of 123,303 of whom 61,194 were men and 62,109 women; 5,513 or 4.47% of its population were urban dwellers. The two largest ethnic groups reported in Dalocha were the Silte (97.63%) and the Amhara (1.4%); all other ethnic groups made up 0.97% of the population. Silte is spoken as a first language by 97.41%, and spoke 2.14% Amharic; the remaining 0.45% spoke all other primary languages reported. 97.57% of the population said they were Muslim, 2.32% practiced Ethiopian Orthodox Christianity. Concerning education, 12.74% of the population were considered literate, which is less than the Zone average of 20.62%; 3.34% of children aged 7–12 were in primary school, 0.52% of the children aged 13–14 were in junior secondary school, and 1.36% of the inhabitants aged 15–18 were in senior secondary school. Concerning sanitary conditions, 94.04% of the urban houses and 10.46% of all houses had access to safe drinking water at the time of the census; 28.82% of the urban and 2.58% of all houses had toilet facilities.
