= Tiya =

Town in central Ethiopia

- Town
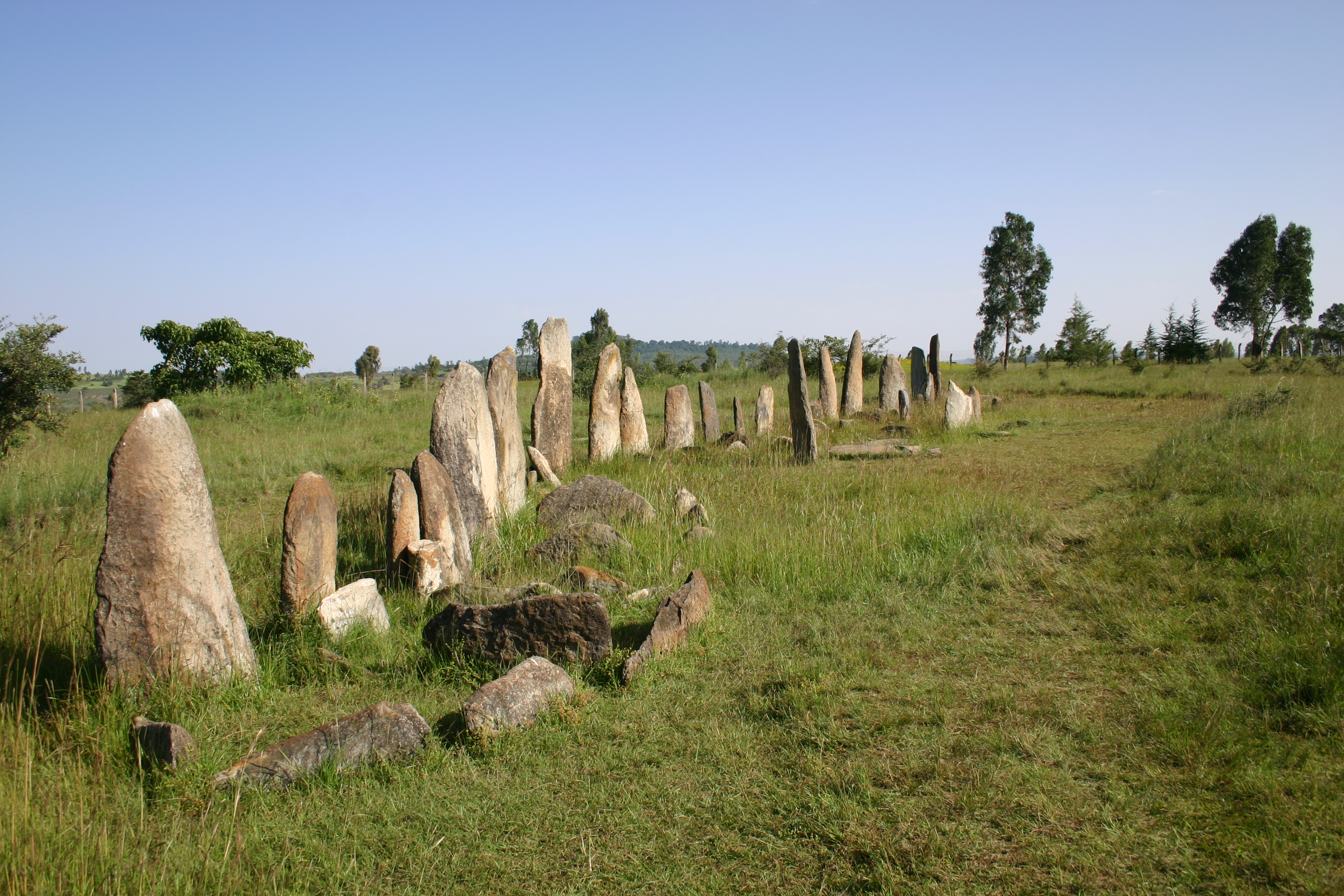

- Location in Ethiopia
- Coordinates: 8°26′N 38°37′E
- Country: Ethiopia
- Region: Southern Nations, Nationalities, and Peoples' Region
- Zone: Gurage

Population (2005)
  - Total: 3,363

Tiya is a town in central Ethiopia. It is situated in the Gurage Zone of the Southern Nations, Nationalities, and Peoples Region south of Addis Ababa. It is also the location of the Tiya archaeological site, famous for its unique stelae.

== Demographics ==
Based on figures from the Central Statistical Agency in 2005, Tiya has an estimated total population of 3,363 of whom 1,615 are men and 1,748 are women. The 1994 national census reported this town had a total population of 1,856 of whom 894 were males and 962 were females. Tiya is one of three towns in Soddo woreda.

== See also ==
- Tiya (archaeological site)
