= South Soddo =

District in Central Ethiopia

- District
- Interactive map of South Soddo
- Country: Ethiopia
- Region: Central Ethiopia Regional State
- Zone: East Gurage Zone
- Seat: Kella

Government
  - Chief administrator: Mesfin Admasu

South Soddo, (Amharic: ደቡብ ሶዶ) is a district in Ethiopia. The district is one of four districts in East Gurage Zone of Central Ethiopia Regional State. The district's administrative center is Kella town. Before August 2023, South Sodo district was administered within Gurage Zone. At that time, it was one of the districts that rejected through the council the decision of Gurage Zone to remain separate from the neighboring zones before the establishment of the Central Ethiopia Regional State.

== Population ==
The total population of the district is about 57,749. Of these numbers males count 27,968 and females count 29,781.
