= Project Mercy =

Ethiopian non-profit organization

Project Mercy, Inc. is a Christian, non profit organization located in Yetebon, Ethiopia, founded in 1977 by Marta Gabre-Tsadick and Deme Tekle-Wold. Over the past 18 years, Project Mercy's original mission has been expanded to include community development and self-help programs.

The international ministry of Project Mercy was started to provide emergency relief and relocation assistance to Ethiopian refugees. The ministry has expanded to reach to a number of additional countries including Ivory Coast, Djibouti, Guinea, Iraq, Kenya, Malawi and Sudan. In 1993, the organization shifted its focus to creating a relief and development model that can be used by others to help break the cycle of famine and poverty in communities. They have taken a holistic community development approach in aiding the Yetebon community (a farming district in Central Ethiopia) With a variety of programs to aid both the physical and spiritual needs of the area.

== Yetebon, Ethiopia ==
Yetebon is a small village located 9 km from Butajira, and is about a two-hour drive south of Addis Ababa. It has a population of about 70,000 people. Yetebon is the home of the Gurahge people who are tradesmen, herdsmen, and farmers. Project Mercy sits on 53 acres (210,000 m^{2}) of land, donated by the elders of Yetebon. The people Project Mercy serves in Yetebon are predominantly Muslim believers. There are many mosques and Ethiopian Orthodox churches in the area.

== History ==
In 1974, Marta Gabre-Tsadick, her husband, Demeke Tekle-Wold, and their children were all forced to flee Ethiopia, barely escaping the chaos of the emerging Marxist government. Marta, the first woman senator in the Ethiopian government, had been identified as a supporter of Emperor Haile Selassie, and because of this, her execution was assured. After hearing this news, Marta and Deme made the decision to flee to Kenya. After first finding help there, the family soon moved to the United States. Eventually, they all became U.S. citizens, but Marta and Deme intended to return to help the people in Ethiopia. So, in 1977, they established Project Mercy in Yetebon, the birthplace of Marta's father. It was started to provide emergency relief and relocation help to refugees. They wanted to "one day return to their homeland to do everything they could to educate its future leaders in restoring its rich heritage" (casefoundation.org). Marta eventually had the opportunity to return to Ethiopia. She received word that a few of the elders of Yetebon wanted to meet with her. The elders expressed to her how they feared for their children's future because there was no hope (people were dying from preventable diseases, the community was illiterate, and there was no clean water or usable roads). Project Mercy is affiliated with Share Our Strength (SOS). Share Our Strength works with organizations like Project Mercy to identify the most efficient ways of expanding existing social services, and to replicate exemplary models. Project Mercy was originally started as a school for children, grades K-10. In December 2002 Project Mercy used a US$20,000 donation from SOS to feed 600 people for six weeks, focusing on severely malnourished children and their parents. In 1983, Marta wrote and published a book, Sheltered by the King, which describes the hardships she and Demeke, along with their children, endured while fleeing Ethiopia to find safety in the U.S., and eventually establish Project Mercy.

== Programs ==
When it started, Project Mercy provided emergency relief and relocation assistance to African refugees. Project Mercy enlarged its initial focus and, for nearly two decades, it not only provided emergency relief aid, but has expanded its help to educational assistance and support for refugee evangelists. Project Mercy provides social services, including emergency feeding, job training, health care, including HIV/AIDS education, irrigation systems, agricultural development, orphan support, and education. Project Mercy not only responds to crises, but also focuses on self-sufficiency, sustainability and measurable impact.

"In order to fight against poverty you have to attack it from many different directions and then pluck it out," said Marta in 2009 as she described the community development model of Project Mercy. "We cannot educate children if the only outcome is to make them discontented with the limited job opportunities currently available to them. We cannot just treat symptoms of malnutrition in the clinic and not also improve nutrition and agricultural production. We cannot teach good hygiene practices if people still need to bathe and drink from the same contaminated water supply. Clean water piped into each home is possible but only if economic conditions are improved for the entire community. Project Mercy is involved in all these things in order to be a means of transformation through which God's love can renew the heart of the nation."

=== Childcare Programs ===
Project Mercy recently embarked on a new orphan and foster care program called the "Children’s Institute". This was in response to a request by the local government of the Oromia Region in Ethiopia if they would accept and provide care for vulnerable children, many of whom are HIV/AIDS victim orphans. The plan provides for an intimate and nurturing environment for 200 young children in a family-like setting of one house mother and up to eight children per home, and anticipates the construction of 30 family homes. The homes will each have a garden along with a cow to provide ongoing nutrition and care. Construction has begun with significant progress being made on the first section of six homes. Currently a number of orphans are being housed and cared for with other foster children at the Yetebon compound.

Many of the students teach literacy, HIV/AIDS prevention, family planning, basic arithmetic and back yard gardening to families in the mountain areas surrounding Yetebon. Thousands of people have benefited from this initiative and nearly 8,000 can now read and write for the first time because of these programs.

=== Education Programs ===
The Medhane-Alem School has about 1,600 students enrolled in Kindergarten through grade 12, and there are over 90 graduates of the high school who are currently enrolled in various universities within Ethiopia. The School Meal Program also provides two meals per school day to each of the students.

==== Skills Enhancement Programs ====
A Skills Enhancement Program is empowering men and women from the community by training them in marketable skills that they can use to earn an income. Women are being trained in traditional spinning of cotton, weaving baskets, creating embroidered table linens and making elegant jewelry. Men are learning masonry, construction material fabrication, carpentry and metal working. In addition to learning a valuable trade, every individual enrolled in our Skills Enhancement Program must also learn basic reading, writing and arithmetic.

=== Healthcare Programs ===
Project Mercy operates the Glenn C. Olsen Primary General Hospital. This state of the art facility is equipped with diagnostic services, as well as a Surgical Ward, Pediatric Ward, Delivery Ward and Medical Ward. Additionally, health classes are taught on personal hygiene, food keeping, housekeeping, and communicable and non-communicable disease control. The hospital also has people from the community who have gone through training to become sanitarians. They go into the mountains and outer areas of the region and teach families about hygiene and sanitation practices.

=== Relief Programs ===
Providing a means for ongoing food sources is the key to eradicating future famine. Initiating family food security measures provide sustenance and also a means for income. Project Mercy’s agricultural program’s focus began as a result of the 2003 famine. Project Mercy worked very hard during that time to deliver monthly dry rations dispersed to 200,000 heads of families at sites within a 180-mile circumference from Yetebon. Project Mercy also cared for hundreds of the most severe cases of malnutrition in its emergency feeding centers. Project Mercy’s Supplemental Care program involved 75,000 children who were fed five times per day. An additional 1,300 children and elderly were cared for (fed intravenously due to the severity of malnutrition) in our Therapeutic Feeding Program. In spite of the horrendous effects of the famine, most of the children and elderly were saved.

=== Agriculture Programs ===
==== Demonstration Gardens ====
The farmers in the rural areas of Ethiopia had not been taught many of the newer farming techniques or how to replenish their land. Project Mercy started large demonstration gardens in order to teach the school students as well as local farmers some of the methods that can be used to enhance their crops. Gardens were started using a variety of nutritious vegetables – many of which were new to the people of Yetebon. Once the vegetables matured, many from the community had their first introduction to broccoli, carrots, tomatoes, kale, spinach, etc. The seeds of some of the new vegetables were also dried for the next planting and shared with those in the community who were interested. The Project Mercy gardens are also used to provide a large portion of the food for the School Meal Program.

==== Drip Irrigation ====
Depending solely upon their small one acre farms for sustenance was something disastrous for farmers due to long periods of no rain or torrential rains that would wash out their crops. Project Mercy began experimenting with drip irrigation within its own gardens to manage the effects of the weather cycles. After it proved to be successful in the demonstration gardens, the drip irrigation program expanded through the dispersion of drip irrigation bucket kits.

==== Fruit Trees ====
Educational Concerns for Hunger Organization (ECHO) specializes in supplying expertise along with a variety of fruit tree seedlings, including avocado, mango, and papaya seeds. Once the trees reach a certain growth stage, they can be used for grafting. The avocado, mango, and papaya survive well with little water and are source for their nutrient density. Once the root stock is built up and growing strong, grafts will be provided to local residents. These trees will generate nutritious fruit at home sites throughout the community to produce a cash crop in good times and serve as a buffer in times of food scarcity.

==== Dairy Cattle Breeding ====
Additional funding and expertise continues to be invested in a Dairy Cattle Breeding Program, which hopes to dramatically increase the milk production through successful crossbreeding and artificial insemination. The number of new calves born under the program continues to grow. Barns have been constructed on the 350-acre site in Cha Cha, Ethiopia and new equipment is in place to also plant and assist with crop management.

== Citations ==
- Personal letter from Marta Gabre-Tsadick, December 13, 2005.
- Charity Navigator Rating – Project Mercy at www.charitynavigator.org
- New Hospital at Project Mercy at cindybeads.com
- Share Our Strength – Ending Childhood Hunger in America at www.strength.org
- https://marriottschool.byu.edu/alumni/portal/featured/index.cfm?siteareaid=14
