= Yetebon, Ethiopia =

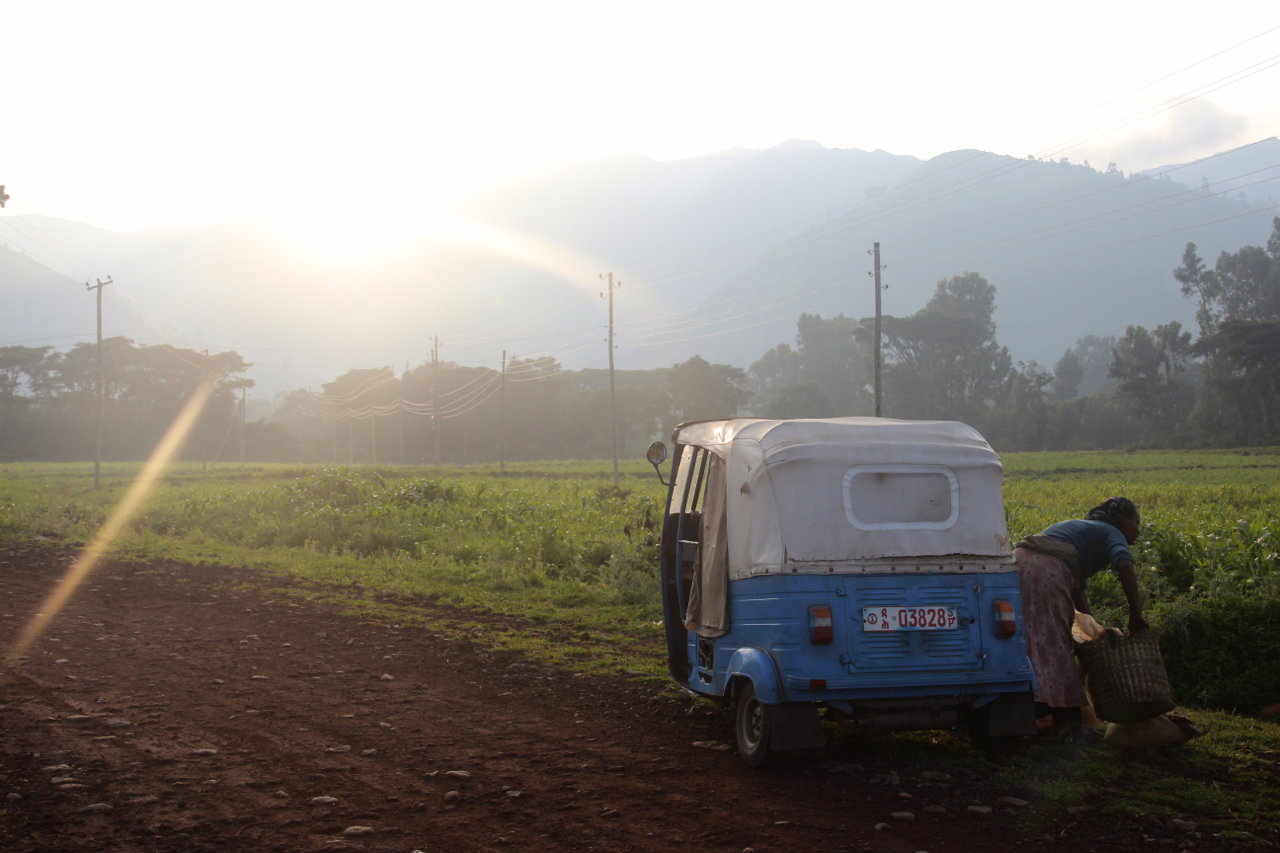
A woman in Yetebon

Yetebon is a small village in the former Meskanena Mareko woreda of Ethiopia.

The village is located 9 kilometres (5.6 mi) from Butajira, and is about a two-hour drive south of Addis Ababa, and is 75 miles (121 km) south of Addis Ababa. Yetebon is the home of the Gurage people who are tradesmen, herdsmen, and farmers.

Guraghes live in tukuls, which are circular mud and wattle structures with tall thatched roofs and generally no windows. They stand in small clusters, on the steep mountainsides and in the valleys.

Yetebon is the home of Project Mercy, a non-profit organization that not only provides emergency relief aid, but has also expanded its focus to provide educational assistance and support for refugee evangelists. Project Mercy operates a school, an orphan support program, and a well-staffed community hospital- the Glenn C. Olsen Hospital.

Project Mercy's philosophy is to take a holistic approach. "In order to fight against poverty you have to attack it from many different directions and then pluck it out," explains founder Marta Gabre-Tsadick. "We cannot educate children if the only outcome is to make them discontented with the limited job opportunities currently available to them. We cannot just treat symptoms of malnutrition in the clinic and not also improve nutrition and agricultural production. We cannot teach good hygiene practices if people still need to bathe and drink from the same contaminated water supply. Clean water piped into each home is possible only if economic conditions are improved for the entire community."

== Citations ==
- https://marriottschool.byu.edu/alumni/portal/featured/index.cfm?siteareaid=14
