= Worabe =

Werabe
- Location within Ethiopia
- Coordinates: 8°1′N 38°20′E
- Country: Ethiopia
- Region: Southern Nations, Nationalities, and Peoples' Region
- Zone: Silte
- Elevation: 2,113 m (6,932 ft)

Population (2005)
  - Total: 1,250k
- Time zone: UTC+3 (EAT)

Werabe (allegedly from the Silti word for "Hyena") is a town in south-central Ethiopia. Official sources locate this town in the Silte Zone of the Southern Nations, Nationalities and Peoples Region (SNNPR), although it is reported that at a referendum in 2000 the Silt'e people unanimously voted to form their own Zone, Silt'e, which includes Werabe. The town has a latitude and longitude of 8°1′N 38°20′E with an elevation of 2,113 meters (6,932 ft) above sea level.

According to the Central's Bureau of Finance and Economic Development, as of 2003 Werabe amenities include digital telephone access, postal service, and 24-hour electrical service. Werabe has nearly 120,000 people Capital of silte zone Near to lakes with best sand used for construction of buildings in central ethiopia

== History ==
The first recorded mention of Worabe dates to 1583/1584 (442 years ago), during the reign of Emperor Sarsa Dengel, when members of the Oromo people arrived in the area and began to besiege Worabe and Fanfara.

A German ethnographic expedition visited this town in April 1935. They found a big town on a flat hill, with a small lake to the east and fields which were likely to get waterlogged in the rainy season, as well as ancient decorated monoliths in the neighbourhood, which were first described by Père Azaïs, who had travelled in the area in the 1920s, but the later German expedition failed to find two of the most important monuments. Local people thought they had been moved to Addis Ababa, but they could not be traced there.

== Demographics ==
Based on figures from the Central Statistical Agency in 2005, Werabe has an estimated total population of 1,250 of whom 668 are men and 582 are women. The 1994 national census reported this town had a total population of 690 of whom 370 were males and 320 were females. It is one of three towns in Silte woreda.
