= Wulbareg =

Coordinates: 7.770°N 38.181°E

Wulbareg is one of the woredas in the Southern Nations, Nationalities, and Peoples' Region of Ethiopia. This woreda is named after the sub-group of the Siltʼe people . Part of the Siltʼe Zone, Wulbareg is bordered on the southwest by the Hadiya Zone, on the west by Misraq Azernet Berbere, on the north by Alicho Werero, on the northeast by Silte, on the east by Dalocha, and on the south by Sankurra. It was created from parts of Dalocha and Silte woredas.

== Demographics ==
Based on the 2007 Census conducted by the CSA, this woreda has a total population of 79,981, of whom 38,284 are men and 41,697 women; 2,198 or 2.75% of its population are urban dwellers. The majority of the inhabitants were Muslim, with 98.65% of the population reporting that belief, while 1.04% practiced Ethiopian Orthodox Christianity.
