= Kella, Ethiopia =

Town in Central Ethiopia

Kella
- Town
- Location within Ethiopia
- Coordinates: 8°15′15.5210″N 38°29′42.4475″E
- Country: Ethiopia
- Region: Central Ethiopia Regional State
- Zone: East Gurage Zone
- Elevation: 1,956 m (6,417 ft)
- Time zone: UTC+3 (East Africa Time)

Kella is town in Central Ethiopia Regional State within East Gurage Zone, Ethiopia. Kella serves as the administrative seat of South Soddo district. The town is located at 8°15′15.5210″N 38°29′42.4475″E, and its altitude is 1,956 meters above sea level. Kella is a home of Soddo gurage people and located in 111 km south from Addis Ababa.

== Infrastructures ==
Kella has infrastructures such as paved roads and electric service, health centers, public market services, hotels and restaurant services, pure water services and telecommunication services.
