= Sankurra =

Sankurra (Silt'e: ሳንኩር/Saankur) is one of the woredas in the Southern Nations, Nationalities, and Peoples' Region of Ethiopia. Part of the Silt'e Zone, Sankurra is bordered on the west by the Hadiya Zone, on the north by Wulbareg, on the northeast by Dalocha and Lanfro, and on the southeast by the Alaba special woreda. The administrative center is Alem Gebeya.

== Demographics ==
Based on the 2007 Census conducted by the CSA, the woreda has a total population of 84,736, of whom 42,480 are men and 42,256 women; 3,656 or 4.32% of its population are urban dwellers. The majority of the inhabitants were Muslim, with 98.12% of the population reporting that belief, while 1.38% practiced Ethiopian Orthodox Christianity.
