= Misraq Silti =

District in Central Ethiopia

- District
- Interactive map of Misraq Silti
- Country: Ethiopia
- Region: Central Ethiopia Regional State
- Zone: Silt'e
- Seat: Gerbeber

Government
  - Chief administrator: Salo Fani

Misraq Silti, (Amharic: ምስራቅ ስልጢ) is a district in Ethiopia. The district is one of ten districts in Silt'e Zone of Central Ethiopia Regional State. The district has a favorable ecosystem that allows for irrigation-based farming three times in a year.

== Population ==
The total population of the district is about 60,578. Of these numbers males count 37,221 and females count 23,357.
