= Tora, Ethiopia =

Town in Central Ethiopia

Tora
- Town
- Location within Ethiopia
- Coordinates: 7°51′36″N 38°25′12″E
- Country: Ethiopia
- Region: Central Ethiopia Regional State
- Zone: Siltʼe Zone

Government
  - Mayor: Husien Sunemo
- Elevation: 1,980 m (6,500 ft)
- Time zone: UTC+3 (East Africa Time)

Tora is town in central Ethiopia. Tora located in Siltʼe Zone of Central Ethiopia Regional State. The town serves as the administrative seat of Lanfro district. The town is located at 7°51'36"N, 38°25'12"E, and its altitude is 1,980 meters above sea level.

== Infrastructures ==
Tora has infrastructures such as paved roads and electric service, public market services, hotels and restaurant services, pure water services and telecommunication services. In addition, urban corridor development projects were undertaken beginning in 2024 and have significantly enhanced the city’s urban aesthetics and infrastructure quality.
