= Buee =

Town in Central Ethiopia

Buee: ቡኢ (Amharic)
- Town
- Location within Ethiopia
- Coordinates: 8°19′15″N 38°33′0″E
- Country: Ethiopia
- Region: Central Ethiopia Regional State
- Zone: East Gurage Zone

Government
  - Mayor: Belete Chaka (Prosperity party)
  - Party Leader: Debebe Adane
- Time zone: UTC+3 (East Africa Time)

Buee (Geʽez: ቡኢ) is a town in East Gurage Zone, of Central Ethiopia Regional State, Ethiopia. The town is located in the highland areas and its elevation is 2,045 meters above the sea level. Buee serves as an administrative capital of Soddo district. The distance between Buee and Addis Ababa, the capital of Ethiopia, is about 100 km. The town is the home of the Gurage people. Buee has infrastructures such as pure drinking water, health institutions and electric service. The town is one of the fast growing towns in Ethiopia.

== Demographics ==
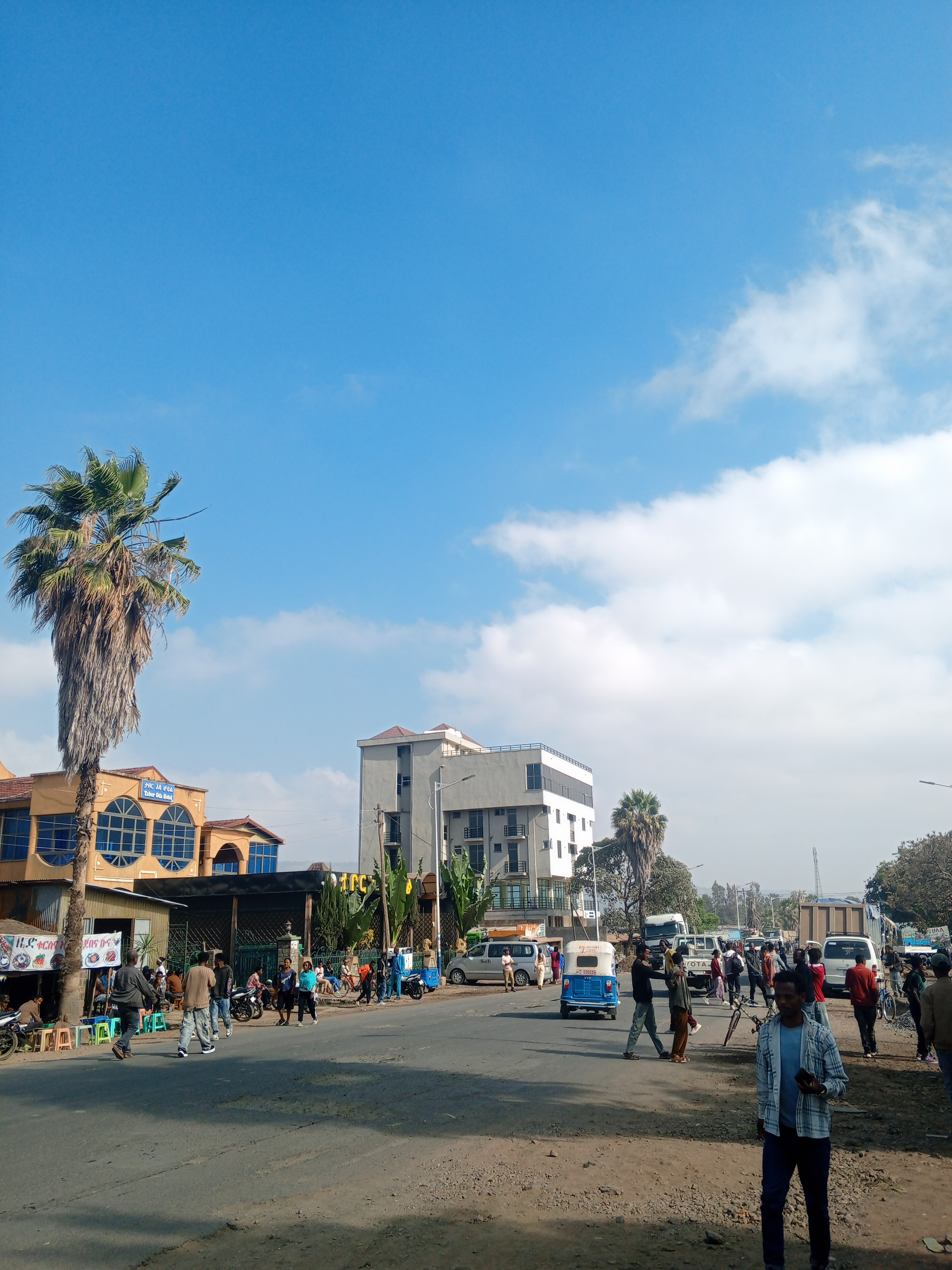
Buee main street

In the town there are Ethiopian Orthodox Christians, Protestantism Muslims, and other religious communities. The estimated population of the town in 2025 reached 50,000.
