= Wabe River =

River in the Gurage Zone, Ethiopia

Wabe River (also Wabi River, Uabi River) is a west-southwest flowing river of south-central Ethiopia, entirely confined within the reaches of Gurage Zone of the Southern Nations, Nationalities, and Peoples' Region.

This river is a perennial river. A principal tributary of the Omo River on the left side, it joins the much larger Gibe River at 8.224°N 37.623°E. The river rises at an elevation of 2,850 m in the Shewan highlands and discharges into the Omo river at an elevation of 1060 m.

Due to its steep gradient, it is a quickly flowing river with many falls. In particular to mention are the Acho Falls near Welkite with a height of 60 meters. Southwest of Welkite and several kilometers short of its confluence with the Omo River the river shows a very steep series of rapids with an elevation drop of ~400 m in just four kilometers. Due to its special characteristics, the river is (in 2018) under investigation for hydroelectric electricity generation by using the hydropower of the river.

== See also ==
- List of rivers of Ethiopia
