= Kokir Gedebano =

Districts in Central Ethiopia Regional State

Coordinates: 8°20′N 38°15′E

Kokir Gedebano is a wereda in the Central Ethiopia Regional State of Ethiopia. Part of the Gurage Zone, Kokir Gedebano is bordered on the south by Mihur Na Aklil, on the west by Kebena, on the north by the Oromia Region, and on the east by Meskane. The administrative center of Kokir Gedebano is Mehal Amba.

The highest point in this woreda, as well as in the Zone and Region, is Mount Zebidar (3719 meters).

Two varieties of subsistence agriculture are practiced in this woreda: one, in the middle elevations, is based on growing enset and Chat; the other, in the higher elevations, is based on enset and barley. Important cash crops in the middle elevations include teff and chat, while in the higher elevations they are wheat and barley. Other important non-agricultural sources of income include selling butter and remittances.

== Demographics ==
Based on the 2007 Census conducted by the CSA, this woreda has a total population of 93,408, of whom 44,390 are men and 49,018 women; 1,858 or 1.99% of its population are urban dwellers. The majority of the inhabitants were reported as Muslim, with 96.3% of the population reporting that belief, while 3.46% practiced Ethiopian Orthodox Christianity.

The 1994 national census reported a total population for this woreda of 67,862 of whom 32,411 were males and 35,451 were females; 121 or 0.18% of its population were urban dwellers. The largest ethnic group reported in Kokir Gedebano was the Kokir Gedebano people (97.26%); all other ethnic groups made up 2.74% of the population. Gedebanegna Language was spoken as a first language by 97.65% of the population; all other primary languages were spoken by the remaining 2.35%. 98.68% of the population said they were Muslim, and all other religions were observed by the remaining 1.32%. Concerning sanitary conditions, 50% of the urban houses and 4.47% of all houses had access to safe drinking water at the time of the census; 29.17% of the urban and 1.42% of all houses had toilet facilities.

== Education ==
Concerning education, 7.19% of the inhabitants of Kokir Gedebano were considered literate, which is less than the Zone average of 20.62%; 3.12% of children aged 7–12 were in primary school, 0.34% of the children aged 13–14 were in junior secondary school, and 0.15% of the inhabitants aged 15–18 were in senior secondary school. The woreda has a total of 18 primary schools with 165 teachers. There is a primary school, staffed with 40 teachers, and one secondary school, with 10 teachers, in Mehal Amba.
