= Sebat Bet Gurage language =

Gurage language spoken in Ethiopia

Sebat Bet Gurage
- ሰባት ቤት ጉራጌ (Səbat Bet Gurage)
- Native to: Ethiopia
- Region: West Gurage Zone
- Ethnicity: Gurage
- Native speakers: 2.5 million (2022)
- Language family: Afro-Asiatic: Semitic; West Semitic; South Semitic; Ethiopic; South; Outer; West Gurage; Sebat Bet Gurage
- Dialects: Chaha; Ezha; Gumer; Endegegn; Gyeto; Muher; Enemor
- Writing system: Geʽez script

Language codes
- ISO 639-3: sgw
- Glottolog: seba1251

Sebat Bet ("Seven houses") is an Ethio-Semitic language of the Afroasiatic language family spoken in Ethiopia.

== Overview ==
One of the Gurage languages, Sebat Bet is divided into several dialects. The latter are spoken in the western Gurage Region:

- Chaha (Cheha) is spoken in Cheha and is the best studied of these varieties
- Mesqan is spoken in Meskan
- Ezha (Eza, Izha) is spoken in Ezhana Wolene
- Muher is spoken in the mountains north of Cheha and Ezhana Wolene
- Geta is spoken in Geta
- Gumer (Gwemarra, Gʷəmarə), spoken in Gumer
- Inor (Ennemor), spoken in Enemorina Eaner

- Endegegn and the extinct Mesmes language are sometimes considered subdialects of Inor.
