= Soddo (woreda) =

District in Central Ethiopia Regional State

Coordinates: 8°20′N 38°40′E

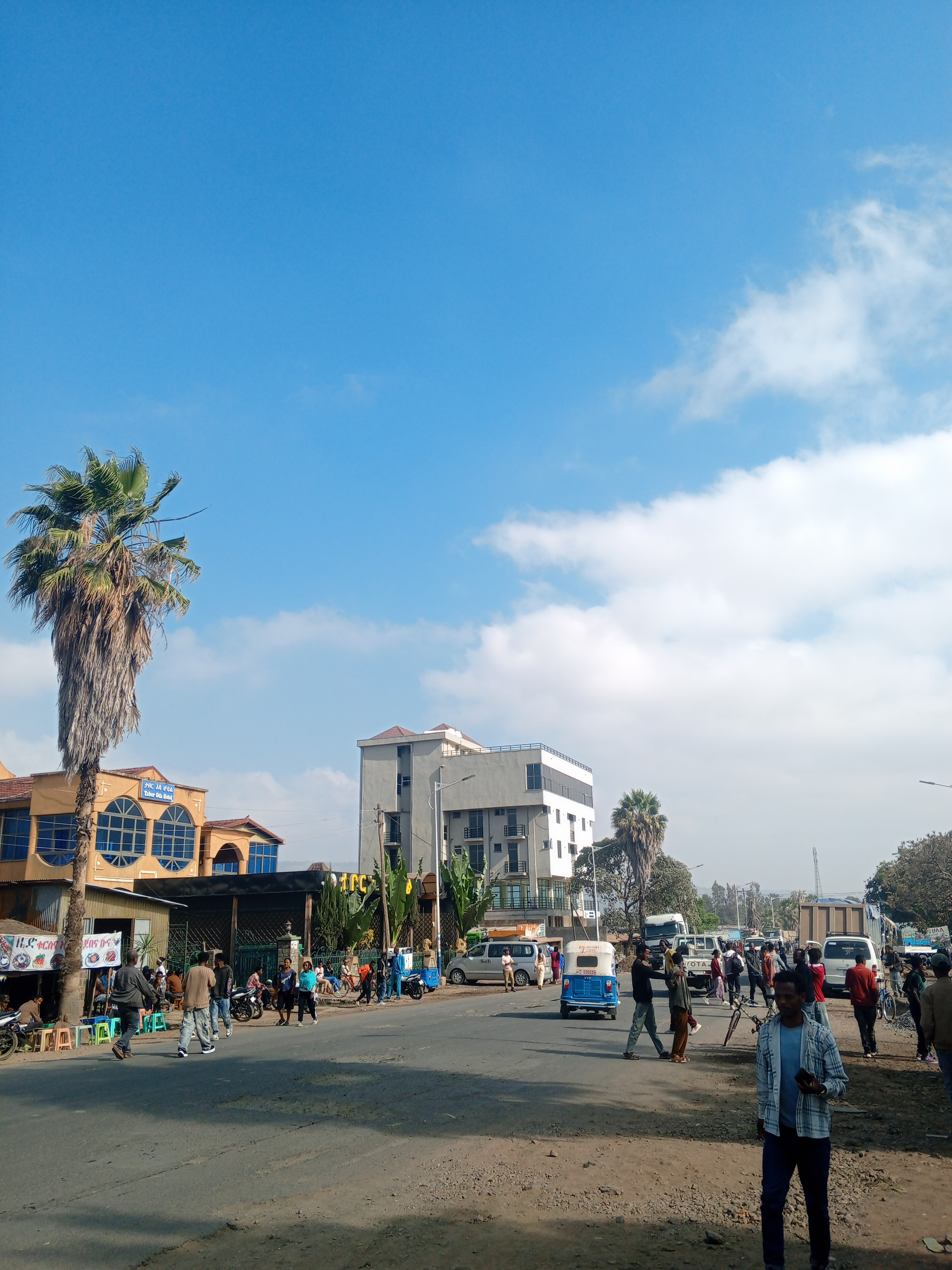
Buee main street

Soddo (Amharic: ሶዶ) is one of the woredas in the Central Ethiopia Regional State of Ethiopia. This woreda is named after the Soddo Gurage people. It is Part of the East Gurage Zone. Soddo is bordered on the south by South Soddo, and on the west, north and east by the Oromia Region. The administrative center of the district is Buee. Southern part of Soddo district separted formed South Soddo district.

Landmarks in this woreda include Medrekebd Abo monastery, which is located 22 kilometers from Buee. This 15th-century monastery is a burial place of the Ethiopian Orthodox Church martyr, Abuna Gabra Manfas Qeddus. Although the relics of the monastery were taken to an island in Lake Ziway where they escaped the destruction of Imam Ahmed ibn Ibrahim al-Ghazi in the 16th century, the monastery itself was looted by the Italians during their occupation. Another local landmark is the Geyet Gereno Stelae, a complex of about 100 stones located 14 kilometers from Buee with similarities to the stelae field in Tiya, which is also located in this woreda.

In the early 1990s, during the period of the Transitional Government, under the influence of the Soddo Jida Democratic Action Group a group of kebeles in Soddo chose through referendum to unite with the Oromia Region. This led to an angry population in Soddo to create its own opposition organization.

== Demographics ==
Based on the 2007 Census conducted by the CSA, this woreda has a total population of 2,683,743 of whom 1,341,000 are men and 1,342,743 women; 10.19% of its population are urban dwellers. The majority of the inhabitants practice Ethiopian Orthodox Christianity, with 93.35% of the population reporting that belief, while 3.3% were reported as Muslim, and 3.28% were Protestants.

The 1994 national census reported a total population for this woreda of 108,280 of whom 54,308 were males and 53,972 were females; 6,253 or 5.77% of its population were urban dwellers. The three largest ethnic groups reported in Soddo were the Soddo Gurage (85.25%), the Oromo (11.58%), and the Amhara (1.47%); all other ethnic groups made up 1.7% of the population. Soddo Gurage is spoken as a first language by 91.06% of the population; while 5.17% spoke Oromiffo, 2.54% spoke Amharic and the remaining 1.23% spoke other languages. Ethiopian Orthodox Christianity was practiced by 96.74% of the population, and 2.28% said they were Muslim. Concerning sanitary conditions, 82.24% of the urban houses and 12.45% of all houses had access to safe drinking water at the time of the census; 25.15% of the urban and 3.15% of all houses had toilet facilities.
