= Siltʼe Zone =

Zone in Central Ethiopia Regional State

- Zone
- Interactive map of Siltʼe Zone
- Country: Ethiopia
- Region: Central Ethiopia Regional State
- Capital: Worabe

Government
  - Chief Administrator: Zeyne Bilka (Prosperity Party)
- Time zone: UTC+3 (EAT)

Map of the regions and zones of Ethiopia

Siltʼe is a zone in the Central Ethiopia Regional State of Ethiopia. This zone is named for the Siltʼe people, whose homeland lies in this zone. Like other nationalities in Ethiopia, the Siltʼe people have their own language, Siltʼe. Siltʼe is bordered on the south by Halaba, on the southwest by Hadiya, on the north by Gurage, and on the east by the Oromia Region.

Following a referendum held between 18 and 26 April 2001, the Siltʼe unanimously voted to form their own Zone, Siltʼe. Later more woredas from Gurage and Hadya zones and Alaba special woreda were added.

== Demographics ==
Based on the 2007 Census conducted by the Central Statistical Agency of Ethiopia (CSA), Siltʼe Zone has a total population of 750,398, of whom 364,108 are men and 386,290 women; 78,525 or 6.28% are urban inhabitants. The largest ethnic group reported in Siltʼe was the Siltʼe people (97.35%); all other ethnic groups made up 2.65% of the population. Siltʼe is spoken as a first language by 96.95% of the population, and 1.54% speak Amharic; the remaining 1.51% speak all other primary languages reported. The majority of the inhabitants were reported as Muslim, with 97.6% of the population reporting that belief, while 2.03% practiced Ethiopian Orthodox Christianity.

== Woredas ==
Current Districts (also called woreda locally, is third level administration in Ethiopia after Zone) of Siltʼe Zone are:

Districts and administrative towns
Number	Woredas	Administrative town
1	Alicho Werero	Kawaqoto
2	Dalocha Woreda	Dalocha*
3	Lanfro	Tora*
4	Mirab Azernet Berbere	Lera
5	Misraq Azernet Berbere	Kilto
6	Misraq Silti	Gerbeber
7	Mito	Mito town
8	Sankurra	Alam Gebeya*
9	Silti	Kibet*
10	Wulbareg	Kerate

* Town administrations, which are considered as Woreda for all administrative purposes. Worabe which is the seat of the Zone also one of the town administration in the zone.
