= Kebena special woreda =

District of the Central Ethiopia Regional State, Ethiopia

Kebena Special Woreda (Amharic: ቀቤና ልዩ ወረዳ) is one of the special woredas in the Central Ethiopia Regional State of Ethiopia. The district is named after the Kebena people. Kebena is bordered to the East by Wabe river which separates this district from Kokir Ge Kebena is bordered to the west by Abeshge to the north by the Oromia Region. Kebena was historically an independent state prior to the Abyssinian annexation of the territory in 1889.

According to 19th century French geographer Élisée Reclus, Kebena region consists of the finest tobacco.

== Demographics ==
According to the 2008 Census conducted by the CSA, WOREDA had a total population of 368,577 people, of which 186,551 were men and 182,026 were women. 20% of the population are urban inhabitants. The majority of Kebena people identified themselves as Muslim, with 55.87% of the population reporting that belief, while 43.12% practiced Ethiopian Orthodox Christianity, and 0.01% were Protestants.
