= Siltʼe language =

Semitic language of Ethiopia

Siltʼe
- የስልጤ (Yesiltʼe)
- Native to: Ethiopia
- Region: Central Ethiopian
- Ethnicity: Silt'e
- Native speakers: 880,000 (2007 census)
- Language family: Afro-Asiatic: Semitic; West Semitic; South Semitic; Ethiopic; South; Transversal; Harari – East Gurage; East Gurage; Siltʼe
- Writing system: Ge'ez script

Language codes
- ISO 639-3: Either: stv – Siltʼe wle – Wolane
- Glottolog: silt1239

Siltʼe (ስልጥኘ [siltʼiɲɲə] or የስልጤ አፍ [jəsiltʼe af]) is an Ethiopian Semitic language spoken in South Ethiopia. A member of the Afroasiatic family, its speakers are the Siltʼe, who mainly inhabit the Siltʼe Zone in the Southern Nations, Nationalities, and Peoples' Region. Speakers of the Wolane dialect mainly inhabit the Kokir Gedebano district of Gurage Zone, as well as the neighbouring Seden Sodo district of the Oromia Region. Some have also settled in urban areas in other parts of the country, especially Addis Ababa.

== Speakers and dialects ==
Dialects of the Siltʼe language include: Azernet-Berbere, Silti, Wuriro, Ulbareg and Wolane. There are about 940,000 native Siltʼe speakers (2007 census); 125,000 speakers of Wolane.

== Phonology ==
=== Consonants ===
Siltʼe has a fairly typical set of consonants for an Ethiopian Semitic language. There are the usual ejective consonants, alongside plain voiceless and voiced consonants and all of the consonants, except /h/ and /ʔ/, can be geminated, that is, lengthened.

The charts below show the phonemes of Siltʼe. For the representation of Siltʼe consonants, this article uses a modification of a system that is common (though not universal), among linguists who work on Ethiopian Semitic languages, but differs somewhat from the conventions of the International Phonetic Alphabet. When the IPA symbol is different, it is indicated in brackets in the charts.

Consonants
		Labial	Dental/ Alveolar	Postalveolar/ Palatal	Velar	Glottal
Plosive/ Affricate	Voiceless	p (Note: /p/ only plays a marginal role in the system, because it appears in only a few words in the Azarnat dialect.)	t	t͡ʃ ⟨č⟩	k	ʔ (Note: /ʔ/ only plays a marginal role in the system, because (as in Amharic), it is often omitted.)
Plosive/ Affricate	Voiced	b	d	d͡ʒ ⟨ǧ⟩	ɡ	
Plosive/ Affricate	Ejective		tʼ	t͡ʃʼ ⟨čʼ⟩	kʼ	
Fricatives	Voiceless	f	s	ʃ ⟨š⟩		h
Fricatives	Voiced		z	ʒ ⟨ž⟩		
Nasals		m	n	ɲ ⟨ñ⟩		
Approximants		w	l	j ⟨y⟩		
Flap/Trill			r			

=== Vowels ===
Siltʼe vowels differ considerably from the typical set of seven vowels in languages such as Amharic, Tigrinya and Geʽez. Siltʼe has the set of five short and five long vowels that are typical of the nearby Eastern Cushitic languages, which may be the origin of the Siltʼe system. There is considerable allophonic variation within the short vowels, especially for a; the most frequent allophone of /a/, [ə], is shown in the chart. All of the short vowels may be devoiced preceding a pause.

Vowels
	Front	Central	Back
High	i, ii		u, uu
Mid	e, ee	[ə] ⟨a⟩	o, oo
Low		aa	

== Orthography ==
Since at least the 1980s, Siltʼe has been written in the Geʽez script, originally developed for the now-extinct Geʽez language and most familiar today in its use for Amharic and Tigrinya.

This orthographic system makes distinctions among only seven vowels. Some of the short-long distinctions in Siltʼe are therefore not marked. In practice, this probably does not interfere with comprehension because there are relatively few minimal pairs based on vowel length. In written Siltʼe, the seven Geʽez vowels are mapped onto the ten Siltʼe vowels as follows:

- ä → a: አለፈ alafa 'he passed'
- u → u, uu: ሙት mut 'death', muut 'thing'
- i →
  - ii: ኢን iin 'eye'
  - word-final i: መሪ mari 'friend'
  - i ending a noun stem: መሪከ marika 'his friend'
  - impersonal perfect verb i suffix: ባሊ baali 'people said'; በባሊም babaalim 'even if people said'
- a → aa: ጋራሽ gaaraaš 'your (f.) house'
- e → e, ee: ኤፌ eeffe 'he covered'
- ǝ →
  - i (except as above): እንግር ingir 'foot'
  - consonant not followed by a vowel: አስሮሽት asroošt 'twelve'
- o → o, oo: ቆጬ kʼočʼe 'tortoise', kʼoočʼe 'he cut'

== Language vitality ==
Meshesha Make Jobo reports that the use of the Siltʼe language is being replaced by the use of Amharic by some speakers for some domains. He points to large political and social factors, many from the national level. He also points out smaller, local factors, such as the lack of creative genres.

== Bibliography ==
- Dirk Bustorf 2011: Lebendige Überlieferung: Geschichte und Erinnerung der muslimischen Siltʼe Äthiopiens. With an English Summary. Wiesbaden: Harrassowitz (Aethiopistische Forschungen 74).
- Cohen, Marcel (1931). Études d'éthiopien méridional. Société Asiatique, Collection d'ouvrages orientaux. Paris: Geuthner.
- Drewes, A.J. (1997). "The story of Joseph in Sïltʼi Gurage", in: Grover Hudson (ed.), Essays on Gurage language and culture: dedicated to Wolf Leslau on the occasion of his 90th birthday, November 14, 1996, Wiesbaden: Harrassowitz, pp. 69–92.
- Gutt, E.H.M. & Hussein Mohammed (1997). Siltʼe–Amharic–English dictionary (with a concise grammar by E-A Gutt). Addis Ababa: Addis Ababa University Press.
- Gutt, E.-A. (1983). Studies in the phonology of Silti. Journal of Ethiopian Studies 16, pp. 37–73.
- Gutt, E.-A. (1991). "Aspects of number in Siltʼi grammar", in: Proceedings of the 11th International Conference of Ethiopian Studies (Addis Ababa), pp. 453–464.
- Gutt, E.-A. (1997). "Concise grammar of Siltʼe", in: Gutt, E.H.M. 1997, pp. 895–960.
- Leslau, W. (1979). Etymological Dictionary of Gurage (Ethiopic). 3 vols. Wiesbaden: Otto Harrassowitz. ISBN 3-447-02041-5
- Wagner, Ewald (1983). "Seltʼi-verse in arabischer Schrift aus dem Schlobies-Nachlass", in: Stanislav Segert & András J.E. Bodrogligeti (eds.), Ethiopian studies dedicated to Wolf Leslau, Wiesbaden: Harrassowitz, pp. 363–374.
