= Gurage Zone =

Zone in Central Ethiopia Regional State

Coordinates: 8°10′N 38°15′E

Map of the regions and zones of Ethiopia

Gurage is a zone in the Central Ethiopia Regional State of Ethiopia. The region is home to the Gurage people. Gurage is bordered on the southeast by Hadiya and Yem Zone, on the northwest by Kebena Special Woreda, north and east by the Oromia Region, and on the southeast by Siltʼe. Its highest point is Mount Gurage. Wolkite is the largest city and administrative centre of the zone.

== Overview ==
Most parts of this region are heavily eroded, which required farmers to protect their enset fields with stone and soil bunds. During the 1930s, about 20% of the land in Gurage was covered with natural forests, which has since been almost completely cut down; the removal was especially fast during the years 1991 and 1992. As of 1996 one of the largest natural forests is Ziarem forest (also known as Forehina), about 800 hectares in size. On the other hand, beginning in the early 1960s the inhabitants started to grow eucalyptus on an increasing scale, which has increased the amount of land being covered with trees. This region has 783 kilometers of all-weather roads and 281 kilometers of dry-weather roads, for an average road density of 182 kilometers per 1000 square kilometers.

The Central Statistical Agency (CSA) reported that 7,624 tons of coffee were produced in Gurage, Hadiya and Kembata Tembaro combined in the year ending in 2005, based on inspection records from the Ethiopian Coffee and Tea authority. This represented 7.6% of the Southern Nations, Nationalities and Peoples' Region (SNNPR)'s output and 3.36% of Ethiopia's total output.

Following a referendum held between 18 and 26 April 2001, the Siltʼe unanimously voted to form their own region, Siltʼe.

== Demographics ==
Based on the 2007 census conducted by the Central Statistical Agency of Ethiopia (CSA), Gurage has a total population of 1,280,483. The six largest ethnic groups reported in Gurage Zone were the Gurage people (82%), the Mareqo or Libido (4.28%), the Amhara (3.36%), the Kebena (3.34%), the Siltʼe people (2.71%), and the Oromo (1.69%); all other ethnic groups made up 2.62% of the population. Gurage languages are spoken as a first language by 80.54% of the population, 5.28% spoke Amharic, 4.09% spoke Libido, 3.2% spoke Kebena, 2.98% spoke Siltʼe, and 1.06% spoke Oromo; the remaining 2.85% spoke all other primary languages reported. The majority of the inhabitants were reported as Muslim, with 51.91% of the population reporting that belief, while 41.02% practised Ethiopian Orthodox Christianity, 5.79% were Protestants, and 1.12% Catholic.

According to the 1994 census, the six largest ethnic groups reported in Gurage Zone were the Sebat Bet Gurage (45.02%), the Silt'e (34.81%), the Soddo Gurage (9.75%), the Mareqo or Libido (2.21%), the Amhara (2.16%), and the Kebena (1.82%); all other ethnic groups made up 4.21% of the population. Sebat Bet Gurage is spoken as a first language by 39.93%, 35.04% Silt'e, 10.06% spoke Soddo Gurage, 3.93% spoke Amharic, 2.16% spoke Libido, and 1.93% spoke Kebena; the remaining 6.95% spoke all other primary languages reported. The majority of the inhabitants were reported as Muslim, with 62.97% of the population reporting that belief, while 33.98% practised Ethiopian Orthodox Christianity, 1.9% were Protestants, and 0.95% Catholic.

According to a May 24, 2004 World Bank memorandum, 3% of the inhabitants of Gurage have access to electricity, this zone has a road density of 95.4 kilometers per 1000 square kilometers, the average rural household has 0.5 hectares of land (compared to the national average of 1.01 hectares of land and an average of 0.89 for the SNNPR)m the equivalent of 0.2 heads of livestock. 18.9% of the population is in non-farm related jobs, compared to the national average of 25% and a regional average of 32%. 79% of all eligible children are enrolled in primary school, and 12% in secondary schools. 18% of the zone is exposed to malaria, and 38% to tsetse fly. The memorandum gave this zone a drought risk rating of 319.
