= List of districts in the Sidama Region =

This is a list of the woredas, or districts, in the Sidama Region of Ethiopia.

== List of districts ==
The Sidama Region is administratively divided into four zones and the zone-level city of Hawassa; which in turn are subdivided into districts (woredas) and city administrations:

- Central Sidama Zone
  - Arbegona
  - Dale
  - Darara
  - Irgalem (town)
  - Loka Abaya
  - Shafaamo
  - Wonsho (Wonsho)
- Eastern Sidama Zone
  - Harooresa
  - Bansa
  - Booni gangaawa
  - Bura
  - Chabe Gambeltu
  - Chere
  - Da'ela
  - Daye (town)
  - Hoko
- Northern Sidama Zone
  - Bilate Zuria
  - Boricha
  - Gorche
  - Hawassi gangaawa
  - Malga
  - Shabadino
  - Wondo Genet
- Southern Sidama Zone
  - Aleta Wendo
  - Alata Wondo (town)
  - Bursa
  - Chuko
  - Dara
  - Dara Otilcho
  - Hula
  - Teticha
- Hawassa (city)
  - Addis Ketema sub-city
  - Hayk Dar sub-city
  - Mehal sub-city
  - Menahariya sub-city
  - Misrak sub-city
  - Tabor sub-city
  - Hawela Tula sub-city
  - Bahil Adarash sub-city

== See also ==
- Districts of Ethiopia
