= Wendo =

Wendo may refer to:

- Wendo Kolosoy, a musician from the Democratic Republic of the Congo
- Wondo Genet, (also transliterated Wendo Genet), a resort town in Ethiopia
- Aleta Wendo, a town in southern Ethiopia
- Aleta Wendo (woreda), an administrative region in Ethiopia
- Wen-Do, a self-defense technique
