= Hawassa Zuria =

District in Sidama Region, Ethiopia

Coordinates: 7°00′N 38°30′E

Hawassa Zuria is a woreda in Sidama Region, Ethiopia. Located in the Great Rift Valley, Hawassa Zuria is bordered on the south by Shebedino and Boricha, on the west and north by the Oromia Region, and on the east by Wondo Genet. Town of Hawassa and woredas of Wondo Genet and Malga were separated from former Awasa woreda. The rest of this woreda was renamed for Hawassa Zuria (Greater Awasa).

This woreda almost surrounds Lake Awasa on all sides. Another water feature is Lake Chelaka which has vanished into the neighboring wetlands due to deforestation. The forest cover in the area partly covered by this woreda has decreased from 48,924 hectares (or 16%) in 1972 to an estimated 8600 (or 2.8%) in 2000, all caused by the creation of farmland, part of a process that has been underway for the last few hundred years.

== Demographics ==
Based on the 2007 Census conducted by the CSA, this woreda has a total population of 124,472, of whom 62,774 are men and 61,698 women; none of its population are urban dwellers. The majority of the inhabitants were Protestants, with 85.82% of the population reporting that belief, 6.67% were Muslim, and 5.61% were Catholic.

In the 1994 Census this woreda had a population of 345,526, of whom 176,406 were men and 169,120 women; 72,366 or 20.94% of its population were urban dwellers. The five largest ethnic groups reported in Hawassa were the Sidama (67.47%), the Oromo (10.17%), the Amhara (8.86%), the Welayta (6.91%), and the Kambaata (2.03%); all other ethnic groups made up 4.56% of the population. Sidaamu Afoo is spoken as a first language by 69.74% of the inhabitants, 15.67% speak Amharic, 6.48% Oromiffa, 4.56% Welayta, and the Kambaata (1.41%); the remaining 2.14% spoke all other primary languages reported. 59.22% of the population said they were Protestants, 18.01% were Ethiopian Orthodox, 9.7% were Muslim, 5.66% observed traditional religions, and 5.16% embraced Catholicism. Concerning education, 34.96% of the population were considered literate; statistics on school attendance in this woreda are missing. Concerning sanitary conditions, about 96.16% of the urban houses and 42.33% of all houses had access to safe drinking water at the time of the census, while about 88.12% of the urban and 24.16% of the total had toilet facilities. More over it is also one of the top tourist destinations in Ethiopia.
