= Aroresa =

District in Southern Nations, Nationalities, and Peoples' Region, Ethiopia

Coordinates: 6°20′N 39°00′E

Aroresa is a woreda in the Southern Nations, Nationalities, and Peoples' Region of Ethiopia. Located at the eastern tip of the Sidama Zone that extends into the Oromia Region like a peninsula, Aroresa is bordered on the south and southeast by that Region, on the northwest by Bensa, and on the north by Chere. The major town in Aroresa is Mejo. Chere woreda was separated from Aroresa.

According to a 2004 report, Aroresa had 20 kilometers of all-weather roads and no kilometers of dry-weather roads, for an average road density of 23 kilometers per 1000 square kilometers.

== Demographics ==
Based on the 2007 Census conducted by the CSA, this woreda has a total population of 170,240, of whom 85,453 are men and 84,787 women; 2,979 or 1.75% of its population are urban dwellers. The majority of the inhabitants were Protestants, with 94.22% of the population reporting that belief, 1.97% were Muslim, 1.01% observed traditional religions, and 1.01% practiced Ethiopian Orthodox Christianity.

In the 1994 Census this woreda had a population of 94,923, of whom 48,703 were men and 46,220 women; 1,662 or 1.75% of its population were urban dwellers. The three largest ethnic groups reported in Aroresa were the Sidama (96.6%), the Oromo (2.46%), and the Amhara (0.77%); all other ethnic groups made up 0.17% of the population. Sidama is spoken as a first language by 96.92% of the inhabitants, 2.38% speak Oromiffa, and 0.64% Amharic; the remaining 0.06% spoke all other primary languages reported. 83.12% of the population said they were Protestants, 6.65% observed traditional religions, 4.51% were Muslim, and 2.63% were Ethiopian Orthodox. Concerning education, 10.24% of the population were considered literate; 2.80% of children aged 7–12 were in primary school; a negligible number of the children aged 13–14 were in junior secondary school; and 0.19% of the inhabitants aged 15–18 were in senior secondary school. Concerning sanitary conditions, about 68.6% of the urban houses and 6.39% of all houses had access to safe drinking water at the time of the census, while about 13.37% of the urban and 3.79% of the total had toilet facilities.
