= Arbegona =

Coordinates: 6°40′N 38°45′E

Arbegona is one of the woredas in the Southern Nations, Nationalities, and Peoples' Region of Ethiopia. Part of the Sidama Zone, Arbegona is bordered on the south by Bona Zuria, on the southwest by Bursa, on the northwest by Gorche, on the north by the Oromia Region, and on the east by Bensa. The major town in Arbegona is Arbegona.

According to a 2004 report, Arbegona had 36 kilometers of all-weather roads and 25 kilometers of dry-weather roads, for an average road density of 129 kilometers per 1000 square kilometers.

== Demographics ==
Based on the 2007 Census conducted by the CSA, this woreda has a total population of 135,862, of whom 67,744 are men and 68,118 women; 6,745 or 4.97% of its population are urban dwellers. The majority of the inhabitants were Protestants, with 88.91% of the population reporting that belief, 6.48% observed traditional religions, 2.36% were Muslim, and 1.68% practiced Ethiopian Orthodox Christianity.

In the 1994 Census this woreda had a population of 135,453, of whom 68,138 were men and 67,315 women; 3,037 or 2.24% of its population were urban dwellers. The three largest ethnic groups reported in Arbegona were the Sidama (96.8%), the Amhara (1.7%), and the Oromo (0.95%); all other ethnic groups made up 0.55% of the population. Sidamo is spoken as a first language by 98.11% of the inhabitants, 1.03% speak Amharic, and 0.76% Oromiffa; the remaining 0.1% spoke all other primary languages reported. 58.09% of the population said they were Protestants, 32.68% observed traditional religions, 2.73% were Muslim, and 2.66% practiced Ethiopian Orthodox Christianity. Concerning education, 13.16% of the population were considered literate; statistics on school attendance in this woreda are missing. Concerning sanitary conditions, about 8.58% of the urban houses and 14.92% of all houses had access to safe drinking water at the time of the census, while about 52.22% of the urban and 5.06% of the total had toilet facilities.
