= Entoto Raguel Church =

Church in Mount Entoto, Ethiopia

- እንጦጦ ራጉኤል ቤተክርስቲያን
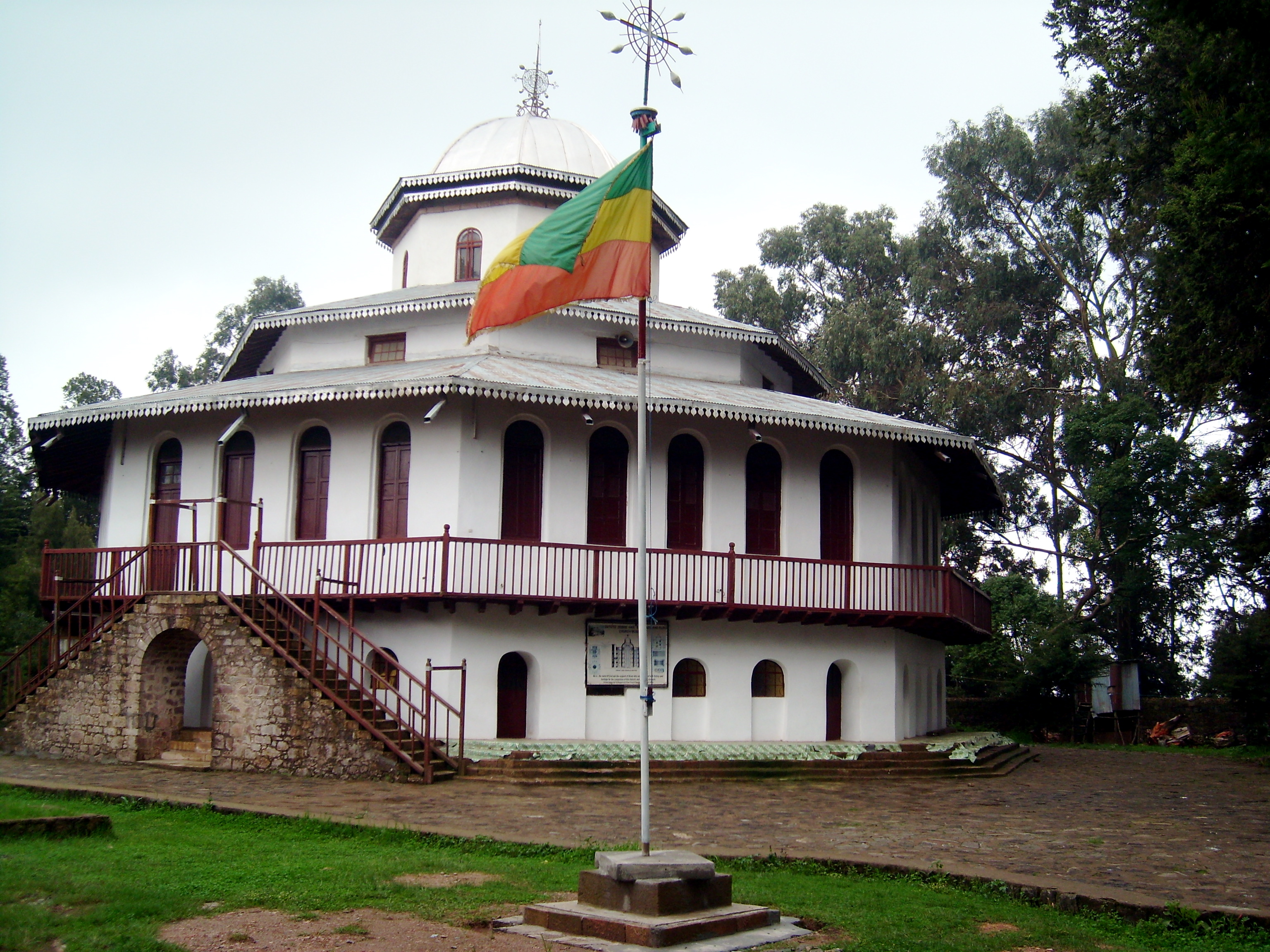
- Entoto Raguel Church
- 9.089555°N 38.750998°E
- Location: Mount Entoto, Ethiopia
- Country: Ethiopia
- Denomination: Ethiopian Orthodox Tewahedo Church

History
- Founder: Menelik II

Architecture
- Style: Ethiopian architecture
- Years built: 1877

Entoto Raguel Church (Amharic: እንጦጦ ራጉኤል ቤተክርስቲያን) is an Ethiopian Orthodox Tewahedo church on the Entoto Hills, 2.5km far away from Addis Ababa, in Ethiopia. The church was built by Emperor Menelik II in 1887. There is an Ethiopian Orthodox Tewahedo Church painting art in the church's interior wall and decorated with hand painting.

== Description ==
Built by Emperor Menelik II in 1877, Entoto Kidus Raguel Church is found on the Entoto Hills about 2.5km away from Addis Ababa. It stands alongside neighbor Entoto Maryam Church. Inside the church, there is an Ethiopian Orthodox Tewahedo Church painting art in the church's interior wall and decorated with hand painting. Visitors can visit its compound abandoned rock carved church chiseled in the rock 700 years. There is also small museum displaying old manuscripts, crosses, and other church relics.
