= Fichee-Chambalaalla =

New Year holiday celebrated by Sidama people in Ethiopia

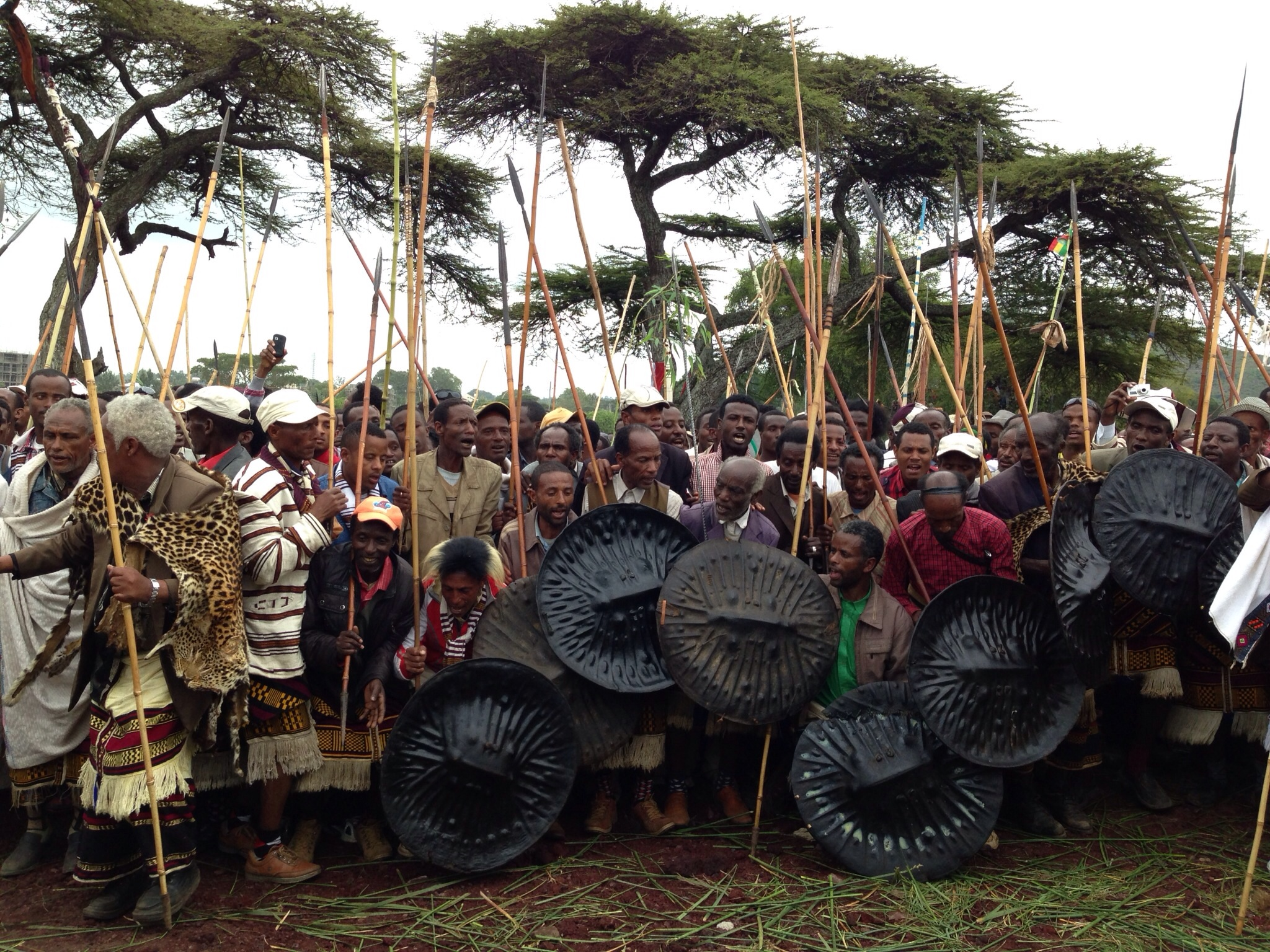
- Sidama people celebrating the Fichee festival in 2013
- Observed by: Sidama people
- Significance: New Year
- Celebrations: Performing dances Singing traditional songs Preparing buurisame (a typical meal) to the community
- 2025 date: 28 March
- Frequency: Annual
- Related to: Ethiopian New Year; Oromo New Year

Fichee-Chambalaalla is a New Year holiday celebrated by Sidama people in Ethiopia. According to the tradition, Fichee commemorates a Sidama woman who visited her parents and relatives once in a year after her marriage and brings buurisame, a meal prepared from false banana, milk and butter, and share to her neighbors. Therefore, it signifies unity among the people.

Fichee is a moveable festival that is determined by astrologers and announced by the clan leaders. Its celebration includes singing traditional songs and performing dance, which is celebrated among all community regardless of age, social status and gender. The festival is inscribed by UNESCO as the representative list of the Intangible Cultural Heritage of Humanity in 2015.

== Observances ==
Fichee-Chambalaalla is a New Year holiday celebrated among Sidama people in Ethiopia. According to the tradition, Fichee commemorates a Sidama woman who visited her parents and relatives once in a year after her marriage and brings buurisame, a meal prepared from false banana, milk and butter, and share to her neighbors. Hence, Fichee is a symbol for unity among Sidama tradition. Fichee is a moveable festival determined by astrologers and the date announced by clans. Celebrations include singing traditional songs and perform dance, and is observed regardless of age, social status and gender.

During the first day, children wanders house-to-house to greet neighbors, who served them buurisame. The clan leaders advised Sidama people to work hard, respect and support the elders, and abstain from cutting down indigenous trees, begging, indolence, false testimony and theft. Overall, the festival promotes social cohesion, good governance and equality among the Sidama people and other ethnic groups in Ethiopia. Adults, especially women, transmit the tradition and knowledge orally to younger generation by preparing buurisame and making hairdressing to their daughters and other girls. In 2015, the festival is inscribed by UNESCO as the representative list of the Intangible Cultural Heritage of Humanity.
