= Bensa =

Coordinates: 6°30′N 38°50′E

Bensa is one of the woredas in Sidama Region of Ethiopia. Daye is the capital city of Eastern Sidaama zone (Soojjaati zoone), also known as Bensa zone. Bensa is one of the more populous woredas in Sidama, extending into the Oromia Region like a peninsula, Bensa is bordered on the south and north by the Oromia Region, with Bona Zuria on the west, Arbegona on the northwest, Chire on the east, and Aroresa on the southeast. The major town in Bensa is Daye.

According to a 2004 report, Bensa had 101 kilometers of all-weather roads and no kilometers of dry-weather roads, for an average road density of 125 kilometers per 1000 square kilometers.

== Demographics ==
Based on the 2007 Census conducted by the CSA, this woreda has a total population of 250,727, of whom 126,959 are men and 123,768 women; 11,588 or 4.62% of its population are urban dwellers. The majority of the inhabitants were Protestants, with 92.8% of the population reporting that belief, 2.67% were Muslim, and 1.89% practiced Ethiopian Orthodox Christianity.

In the 1994 Census this woreda had a population of 186,343, of whom 94,823 were men and 91,520 women; 5,897 or 3.16% of its population were urban dwellers. The three largest ethnic groups reported in Bensa were the Sidama (96.18%), the Amhara (2.2%), and the Oromo (0.96%); all other ethnic groups made up 0.66% of the population. Sidamo is spoken as a first language by 97.64% of the inhabitants, 1.46% speak Amharic, and 0.77% Oromiffa; the remaining 0.13% spoke all other primary languages reported. 77.76% of the population said they were Protestants, 7.59% observed traditional religions, 5.58% were Muslim, 3.21% were Ethiopian Orthodox, and 2.51% were Catholic. Concerning education, 18.18% of the population were considered literate; 6.96% of children aged 7–12 were in primary school; 1.70% of the children aged 13–14 were in junior secondary school; and 0.93% of the inhabitants aged 15–18 were in senior secondary school. Concerning sanitary conditions, about 62.36% of the urban houses and 13.61% of all houses had access to safe drinking water at the time of the census, while about 65.72% of the urban and 5.1% of the total had toilet facilities.
