= Loko Abaya =

Loko Abaya is one of the woredas in the Sidaama National Regional State of Ethiopia. Part of the Sidaama Region located in the Great Rift Valley, Loko Abaya is bordered on the south by the Oromia Region, on the southwest by Lake Abaya, on the west by the Wolayita Zone, on the north by Boricha, on the northeast by Dale, on the east by Shebedino, and on the southeast by Chuko. Loko Abaya was separated from Dale woreda.

== Demographics ==
Based on the 2007 Census conducted by the CSA, this woreda has a total population of 99,233, of whom 50,603 are men and 48,630 women; 1,059 or 1.07% of its population are urban dwellers. The majority of the inhabitants were Protestants, with 87.7% of the population reporting that belief, 3.88% were Catholic, 2.85% observed traditional religions, and 1.93% were Muslim.
