= Dale (woreda) =

District in Sidama Region, Ethiopia

Coordinates: 6°45′N 38°20′E

Dale' is a woreda in Sidama Region, Ethiopia. Located in the Great Rift Valley, Dale is bordered on the south by Aleta Wendo and Chuko, on the west by Loko Abaya, on the northwest by Boricha, on the north by Shebedino, and on the east by Wensho. The major town in Dale is Irgalem, Irgalem. Parts of Dale woreda were separated to create Loko Abaya and Wensho woredas.

== Overview ==
The elevation of this woreda varies from about 1200 meters above sea level along the shores of Lake Abaya to about 3200 meters at its westernmost point. Rivers include the Gidabo. A 2004 survey of the land in Dale shows that 81.9% is arable or cultivable, none used for pasture, 2.7% forest, and the remaining 15.5% is considered swampy, degraded or otherwise unusable. The same survey reported important cash crops for Dale include corn, barley, haricot beans, local varieties of cabbage, and sweet potatoes. Coffee is also an important cash crop in Dale, with 15.38 square kilometers planted with this crop, which produced a total of 9.3 million kilograms of beans in 2002/03 (5.7 million kilograms in 2003/04).

Industry in this woreda includes 57 coffee pulpers. Two micro-finance institutions operate in Dale: the Sidama Microfinance Institution SC (SMFI), established in 1998; and the Omo Microfinance Institution SC (OMFI), established in 1997. While OMFI is a regional organization, SMFI operates only in the Sidama Zone; SMFI has 2,365 active clients and has loaned 5.5 million Birr to woreda inhabitants, while OMFI has 1,547 active clients and has made about 4.1 million Birr in loans. There are 15 multipurpose cooperatives in Dale, of which 12 are organized and registered in accordance with the new cooperatives law, with about 29,295 members or nearly 50% of the rural population; all of them are members of the Sidama Coffee Farmers Cooperative Union. The remaining 3 cooperatives are in the process of complying with the new law. According to a 2004 report, Dale had 27 kilometers of asphalt roads, 166 kilometers of all-weather roads and 28 kilometers of dry-weather roads, for an average road density of 167 kilometers per 1000 square kilometers.

== Population ==
Based on the 2007 Census conducted by the CSA, this woreda has a total population of 242,658, of whom 122,918 are men and 119,740 women; 30,348 or 12.51% of its population are urban dwellers. The majority of the inhabitants were Protestants, with 79.98% of the population reporting that belief, 8.04% practiced Ethiopian Orthodox Christianity, 4.69% were Muslim, 3.46% were Catholic, and 1.3% observed traditional religions.

In the 1994 Census this woreda had a population of 306,329, of whom 156,772 were men and 149,557 women; 24,183 or 7.89% of its population were urban dwellers. The four largest ethnic groups reported in Dale were the Sidama (91.29%), the Amhara (3.98%), the Oromo (1.16%), and the Welayta (1.01%); all other ethnic groups made up 2.56% of the population. Sidamo is spoken as a first language by 92.57% of the inhabitants, 5.93% speak Amharic, 0.46% Welayta, and 0.33% Oromiffa; the remaining 0.71% spoke all other primary languages reported. 58.02% of the population said they were Protestants, 14.54% observed traditional religions, 9.05% practiced Ethiopian Orthodox Christianity, and 7.59% were Muslim.

According to the 2004 survey, only 22% of the inhabitants have access to drinkable water.
