= Gidabo River =

Location
- Country: Ethiopia

Physical characteristics
- Source
  - elevation: ~3,200 m (10,500 ft)
- Mouth
  - location: Lake Abaya at 1,175 m elevation
  - coordinates: 6.55°N 38.05°E
- Length: ~120 km (75 mi)
- Basin size: ~3,302 km^{2} (1,275 sq mi)
- Discharge
  - average: 11.08 m^{3}/s (391 cu ft/s)

The Gidabo River is a medium-sized perennial river of south-central Ethiopia within the Great Rift Valley. The Gidabo River catchment area is one of the leading coffee production areas in Ethiopia.

== Course ==
It is one of three medium-sized rivers discharging into Lake Abaya. The roughly 120 km long river rises on the western slopes of the Soka Sonicha mountain range (with the most prominent being the Gelala mountain) at 6.8°N 38.6°E, flows west first and then for most of its course southwards along the eastern floor of the Great Rift Valley and through the Sidama Zone. It passes the notable town of Yrga Alem. The river turns westward when entering the Gidabo flood plains directly east of Lake Abaya. It finally drains into Lake Abaya at 6.56°N 38.05°E.

In the flood plains and along the final stretch of the river it defines the southern border of the Sidama Zone through which it flows for most of its length. The town of Dilla is the most prominent town in the catchment area of the river. Another town in the catchment area is Aleta Wendo.

== Water flow ==
The river is not navigable and it has no notable tributaries, but the River basin contains a sizable number of ~97 small rivers and streams in three sub-basins. The average annual discharge at its mouth amounts to 11 m^{3}/s, with peak discharges reaching ~40 m^{3}/s in spring and autumn, while in summer and winter the discharge can drop to 2–3 m^{3}/s. A special feature of the Gidabo catchment area is the existence of a large number of springs, which can be used as groundwater sources for agriculture even during the summer and winter dry seasons.

== Gidabo dam ==
17 kilometers by road west of Dilla, where the river turns westward before entering its flood plains and marshes, the Gidabo dam, a 21.3 meter high and 350 m wide earth fill embankment dam is used for flood control and for irrigation purposes of an area of 27 km^{2} downstream as well as for fish production. The storage volume of the dam reservoir amounts to 0.063 km^{3}. The construction of this dam took eight years because of unexpected settlement processes during construction (among other issues) which required to change the dam design and storage volume.

== See also ==
- List of rivers of Ethiopia
- Dams and reservoirs in Ethiopia
