= Dara (woreda) =

District in Southern Nations, Nationalities, and Peoples' Region, Ethiopia

Coordinates: 6°30′N 38°25′E

Dara (Amharic: ዳራ) is one of the woredas in the Sidama Region of Ethiopia. Part of the Sidama Region, Dara is bordered on the south by the Gedeo Zone and on either side of it by the Oromia Region, on the northwest by Chuko, on the north by Aleta Wendo, and on the northeast by Hula. Towns in Dara include Kebado, Teferi Kela Abera and Machisho.

According to a 2004 report, Dara had 8 kilometers of asphalt road, 66 kilometers of all-weather roads and 16 kilometers of dry-weather roads, for an average road density of 369 kilometers per 1000 square kilometers.

== Demographics ==
Based on the 2007 Census conducted by the CSA, this woreda has a total population of 155,265, of whom 76,475 are men and 78,790 women; 10,660 or 6.87% of its population are urban dwellers. The majority of the inhabitants were Protestants, with 85.54% of the population reporting that belief, 7.04% practiced Ethiopian Orthodox Christianity, 2.55% were Muslim, 2.36% observed traditional religions, and 1.43% were Catholic.

In the 1994 Census this woreda had a population of 105,196, of whom 52,043 were men and 53,153 women; 5,130 or 4.88% of its population were urban dwellers. The four largest ethnic groups reported in Dara were the Sidama (89.68%), the Amhara (5.28%), the Silte (1.62%), and the Oromo (1.37%); all other ethnic groups made up 2.05% of the population. Sidamo is spoken as a first language by 92.54% of the inhabitants, and 5.42% speak Amharic; the remaining 2.04% spoke all other primary languages reported. 64.4% of the population said they were Protestants, 15.82% observed traditional religions, 11.85% practiced Ethiopian Orthodox Christianity, 4.23% were Muslim, and 1.4% were Catholic. Concerning education, 27.91% of the population were considered literate; 9.76% of children aged 7–12 were in primary school; 1.82% of the children aged 13–14 were in junior secondary school; and 1.36% of the inhabitants aged 15–18 were in senior secondary school. Concerning sanitary conditions, about 62.94% of the urban houses and 20.04% of all houses had access to safe drinking water at the time of the census, while about 83.53% of the urban and 28.97% of the total had toilet facilities.
