= Aleta Wendo (woreda) =

District in Sidama Region, Ethiopia

Coordinates: 6°35′N 38°20′E

Aleta Wendo is one of the woredas in the Sidama Region of Ethiopia. Aleta Wendo is bordered on the south by Dara, on the west by Chuko, on the north by Dale and Wensho, on the east by Bursa, and on the southeast by Hula. The administrative center is Aleta Wendo. Chuko woreda was separated from Aleta Wendo.

A survey of the land in this woreda shows that 72% is arable or cultivable, 12.9% pasture, 7% forest, and the remaining 8% is considered swampy, degraded or otherwise unusable. Important cash crops include corn, wheat, barley, horse beans, haricot beans, local varieties of cabbage, and shallots. Landmarks include six megalithic sites, which contain a total of 74 steles. According to a 2004 report, Aleta Wendo had 25 kilometers of asphalt roads, 88 kilometers of all-weather roads and 30 kilometers of dry-weather roads, for an average road density of 252 kilometers per 1000 square kilometers.

== Population ==
Based on the 2007 Census conducted by the CSA, this woreda has a total population of 188,976, of whom 96,640 are men and 92,336 women; 22,093 or 11.69% of its population are urban dwellers. The majority of the inhabitants were Protestants, with 72.78% of the population reporting that belief, 7.38% practiced Ethiopian Orthodox Christianity, 3.91% were Muslim, 3.65% were Catholic, and 3.54% observed traditional religions.

In the 1994 Census this woreda had a population of 271,446, of whom 139,213 were men and 132,233 women; 15,904 or 5.86% of its population were urban dwellers. The three largest ethnic groups reported in Aleta Wendo were the Sidama (92.14%), the Amhara (4.36%), and the Oromo (0.92%); all other ethnic groups made up 2.58% of the population. Sidamo is spoken as a first language by 94.12% of the inhabitants, 4.73% speak Amharic, and 0.26% Oromiffa; the remaining 0.89% spoke all other primary languages reported. 61.57% of the population said they were Protestants, 17.31% observed traditional religions, 8.82% practiced Ethiopian Orthodox Christianity, 5.21% were Muslim, and 4.15% embraced Catholicism. Concerning education, 36.98% of the population were considered literate; statistics on school attendance in this woreda are missing. Concerning sanitary conditions, at the time of the 1994 national census about 91.29% of the urban houses and 24.17% of all houses had access to safe drinking water at the time of the census, while about 76.50% of the urban and 12.83% of the total had toilet facilities. However, according to a 2004 survey, none of the inhabitants have access to drinkable water; as a result 20% use unprotected river water, 60% unprotected springs, 1% unprotected ponds, and 19% unprotected wells.
