= Kidane Mihret =

Kidane Mihret or Kidane Mehret may refer to:

== Churches ==
=== Ethiopia ===
- Ura Kidane Mehret, on Zege peninsula
- Kidane Mehret, in Menz
- Kidane Mihret, in Ejersa Goro
- Kidane Mihret, in Mahbere Sillasie
- Kidane Mihret, on Mount Zuqualla
- Kidane Mihret roch church, in Ab'aro, Haddinnet
- Kidane Mihret, near Dabba Hadera monastery
- Kidane Mihret, in Weyname near Bichena
- Kidane Mihret, in Dodola
- Kidane Mihret, in Bure
- Kidane Mihret, in Addi Walka
- Kidane Mihret, in Hagere Selam
- Kidane Mihret, in Emni Ankelalu
- Kidane Mihret, in Nejo
- Kidane Mihret, in Mika'el Abiy
- Kidane Mihret rock church, of Addi Nefas in Abergele

=== Elsewhere ===
- Kidane Mehret Cathedral, in Asmara, Eritrea
- Kidane Mehret Church, Jerusalem, Israel

== Other uses ==
- Kidane Mihret River, in Tigray Region, Ethiopia
- Kidane Mehret, a summit known from the Battle of Adwa, Ethiopia
