= Enkutatash =

Ethiopian and Eritrean New Year holiday

Enkutatash እንቁጣጣሽ
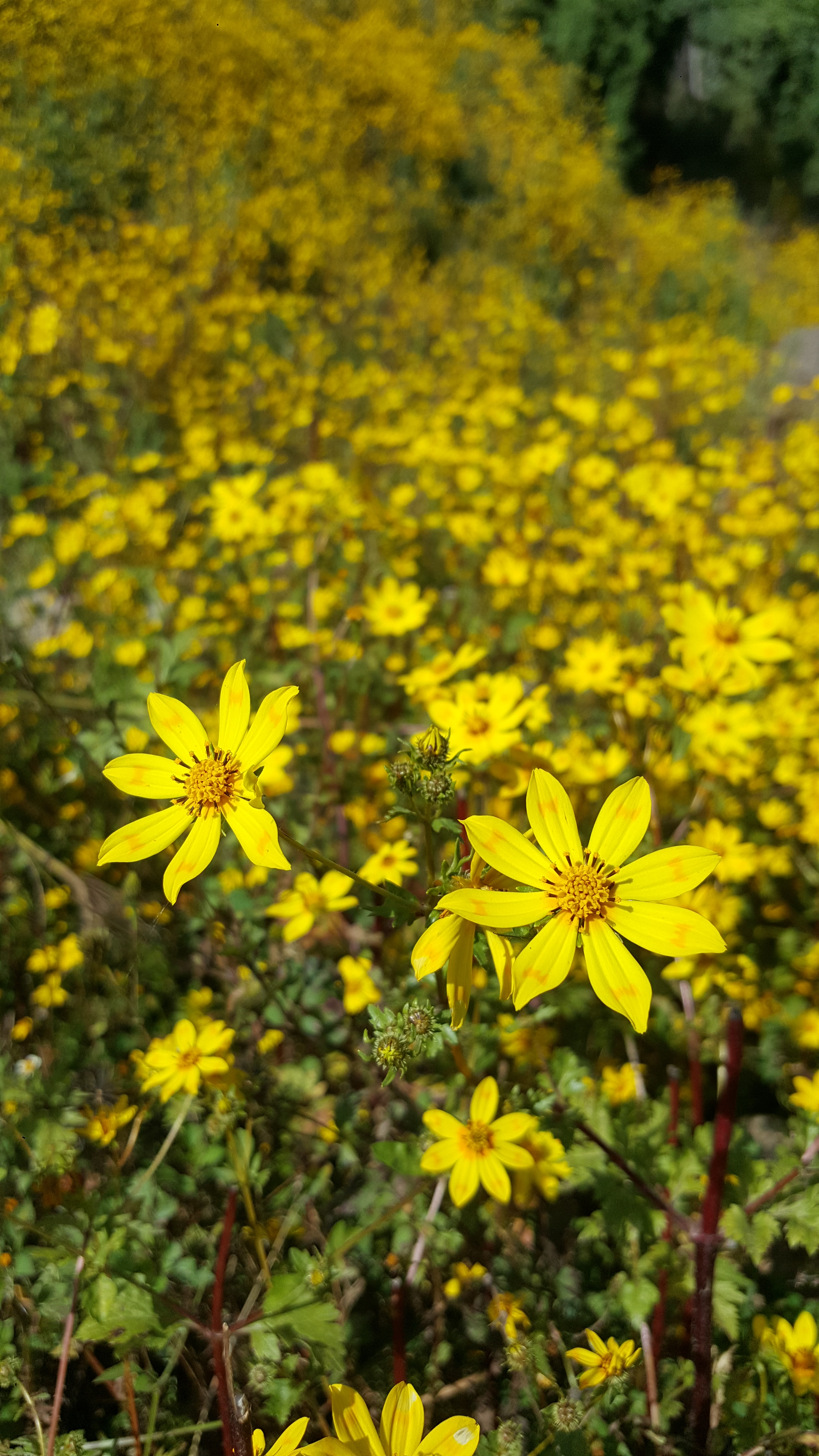
- Enkutatash is an annual holiday observed in September, the perennial Bidens macroptera flower is identified with this holiday due to growing densely in its fully maturation in September.
- Also called: Gift of Jewel
- Observed by: Ethiopia; Eritrea
- Type: National
- Significance: First day of the Ethiopian year
- Celebrations: Relatives especially family members gather and eat meals prepared by chicken's meat natively called doro wat.; Invitations and well-wishing to relatives and friends.
- Date: 11 September; 12 September (leap year)
- 2026 date: 11 September
- Frequency: Annual
- Related to: New Year's Day

Enkutatash (Amharic: እንቁጣጣሽ) is the name given to the Ethiopian New Year, a holiday celebrated to usher in the new year in Ethiopia. It is celebrated on Meskerem 1 in Ethiopian calendar (which corresponds to September 11 in Gregorian calendar or falls on September 12 on each leap year).

== Origin ==
According to Ethiopian tradition, on 11 September Queen of Sheba (Makeda in Ethiopian) returned to Ethiopia from her visit to King Solomon in Jerusalem. Her followers celebrated her return by giving her jewels. Hence the name Enkutatash was given to the holiday which means the ‘‘gift of jewels’’ in Amharic.

== Observance ==
This holiday is based on the Ethiopian calendar. It is the Ethiopian New Year.

Large celebrations are held around the country, notably at the Raguel Church on Mount Entoto.

According to InCultureParent, "after attending church in the morning, families gather to share a traditional meal of injera (flat bread) and wat (sauce). Later in the day, young girls donning new clothes, gather daisies (Adey Abeba) and present friends with a bouquet, go out on the streets, go from door to door, beating drums and singing "Abebaye hoy", a New Year's song." According to the Ethiopian Tourism Commission, "Enkutatash is not exclusively a religious holiday. Modern Enkutatash is also the season for exchanging formal new year greetings and cards among the urban sophisticated – in lieu of the traditional bouquet of flowers."

The Ethiopian counting of years begins in the year 8 of the common era. This is because the common era follows the calculations of Dionysius, a 6th-century monk, while the non-Chalcedonian countries continued to use the calculations of Annianus, a 5th-century monk, which had placed the Annunciation of Christ exactly 8 years later. For this reason, on Enkutatash in the year 2016 of the Gregorian calendar, for example, it became 2009 in the Ethiopian calendar.

== See also ==
- Culture of Ethiopia
- Culture of Eritrea
- New Year's Day
