= Central Sidama Zone =

Zone in Sidama Region

- Zone
- Country: Ethiopia
- Region: Sidama
- Established: 2022
- Capital: Irgalem

Government
  - Chief administrator: Mengistu Mathewos (Prosperity Party)
- Time zone: UTC+3 (EAT)

Central Sidama Zone (Amharic: ማዕከላዊ ሲዳማ ዞን) is an administrative zone in Sidama Region. The zone was established upon a resolution passed by the Sidama regional state council at its third round meeting of the first year in 2022. The zone was established around the end of 2022. Central Sidama is bordered on the south by the Southern Sidama Zone, on the east by the Oromia region, on the north by the Northern Sidama Zone on the southeast by the Eastern Sidama Zone, and west by the Wolayita Zone and Oromia region. The administrative centre of Central Sidama Zone is Irgalem.
