= Chere =

Chere may refer to:

== People ==
- Celes Chere, a fictional character and protagonist in the video game Final Fantasy VI
- Sébastien Chéré (born 1986), French footballer
- Chere Burger (born 1982), South African dressage rider

== Places ==
- Chère, a river in western France
- Chere (woreda), a woreda in Sidama, Ethiopia

== See also ==
- Bele Chere, a former street festival held in Asheville, North Carolina
