= Hagere Selam =

Hagere Selam may refer to:

- Hagere Selam (Degua Tembien), a town in the Tembien, Tigray, Ethiopia
- Hagere Selam (Sidama), a town in the Sidama zone, SNNPR, Ethiopia
