= Hula (woreda) =

District in Southern Nations, Nationalities, and Peoples' Region, Ethiopia

Coordinates: 6°35′N 38°35′E

Hula is one of the woredas in the Southern Nations, Nationalities, and Peoples' Region of Ethiopia. Part of the Sidama Zone, Hula is bordered on the south by the Oromia Region, on the west by Dara, on the northwest by Aleta Wendo, on the north by Bursa, and on the east by Bona Zuria. The major town in Hula is Hagere Selam. Woredas of Bursa and Bona Zuria were separated from Hula.

A survey of the land in this woreda shows that 59.6% is arable or cultivable, 36.2% pasture, 2.3% forest, and the remaining 1.8% is considered swampy, degraded or otherwise unusable. Important cash crops include corn, wheat, barley, local varieties of cabbage, and potatoes. According to a 2004 report, Hula had 110 kilometers of all-weather roads and 8 kilometers of dry-weather roads, for an average road density of 274 kilometers per 1000 square kilometers.

== Population ==
Based on the 2007 Census conducted by the CSA, this woreda has a total population of 129,263, of whom 64,551 are men and 64,712 women; 6,410 or 4.96% of its population are urban dwellers. The majority of the inhabitants were Protestants, with 77.26% of the population reporting that belief, 8.09% observed traditional religions, 6.1% practiced Ethiopian Orthodox Christianity, 3.67% were Catholic, and 2.12% were Muslim.

In the 1994 Census this woreda had a population of 178,644, of whom 89,489 were men and 89,155 women; 4,686 or 2.62% of its population were urban dwellers. The three largest ethnic groups reported in Hula were the Sidama (93.77%), the Amhara (4.43%), and the Oromo (0.84%); all other ethnic groups made up 0.96% of the population. Sidamo is spoken as a first language by 95.48% of the inhabitants, 3.63% speak Amharic, and 0.56% Oromiffa; the remaining 0.33% spoke all other primary languages reported. 55.83% of the population said they were Protestants, 28.08% observed traditional religions, 6.29% practiced Ethiopian Orthodox Christianity, 3.93% were Catholic, and 2.58% were Muslim.

According to a 2004 survey, none of the inhabitants have access to drinkable water, and are forced to use unprotected wells.
