= Southern Sidama Zone =

Zone in Sidama Region

Southern Sidama Zone Wodiidi Sidaami Zoone
- Zone
- Country: Ethiopia
- Region: Sidama
- Established: 2022
- Capital: Aleta Wendo

Government
  - Chief administrator: Mengesha Fitamo (Prosperity Party)
- Time zone: UTC+3 (EAT)

Southern Sidama Zone (Amharic: ደቡባዊ ሲዳማ ዞን) is an administrative zone in Sidama Region. The zone was established after two years later from the establishment of the Sidama region. Southern Sidama Zone is established in August 2022 up on resolution passed by Sidama regional state council. Southern Sidama is bordered on the south by the Oromia region and Gedeo Zone, on the east by the Eastern Sidama Zone, on the north by the Northern Sidama Zone on the west by Oromia region. The administrative centre of Southern Sidama Zone is Aleta Wendo.
