= Wen-Do =

Self-defence art for women developed

Wen-Do is a form of self-defence art for women developed by Ned and Ann Paige, a married couple from Toronto, Ontario. Dr. Paige, an optometrist, dedicated himself to creating a program to teach women to protect themselves after hearing of the murder of Kitty Genovese in New York on March 13, 1964.

Ned and Anne were practitioners of jujutsu, karate and judo. However, through the years as many more women took up Wen-Do, various techniques were shared and added to the system.

The name combines a contraction of the word women with the Japanese word Dō, meaning "way". Though the base and concepts of Wen-Do come from martial arts, Wen-Do is not considered one by its adherents.

Wen-Do classes focus on scenarios that often confront women, such as rape and domestic attacks. Classes do not involve any physical contact unless a student is ready and wants to. The system also encompasses feminist and empowering discussion about issues that face women and violence in contemporary society.

After WenDo was invented in the 1960s and afterwards spread within the western countries, mainly America, Canada, Europe, it was introduced to Egypt in 2013, by Schirin Salem, to tackle the growing phenomena of sexual harassment in public spaces (such as streets, transportation means, work places etc.). WenDo as a practice equips women with practical and easy to apply tools for prevention and protection from different forms of sexual harassment. The set of tools address different types of awareness including psychological awareness, body posture, physical techniques and gender knowledge. The aim is to avoid threatening situations but being able to react if they happen, by taking the appropriate actions. In July 2014 the 1st generation of 14 female Egyptian WenDo trainers was certified. In December 2014, the 2nd generation of WenDo trainers was born, 11 female Egyptian trainers were certified.

== See also ==
- Model Mugging, another feminist self-defense program, now known as Impact, uses padded attacker.
