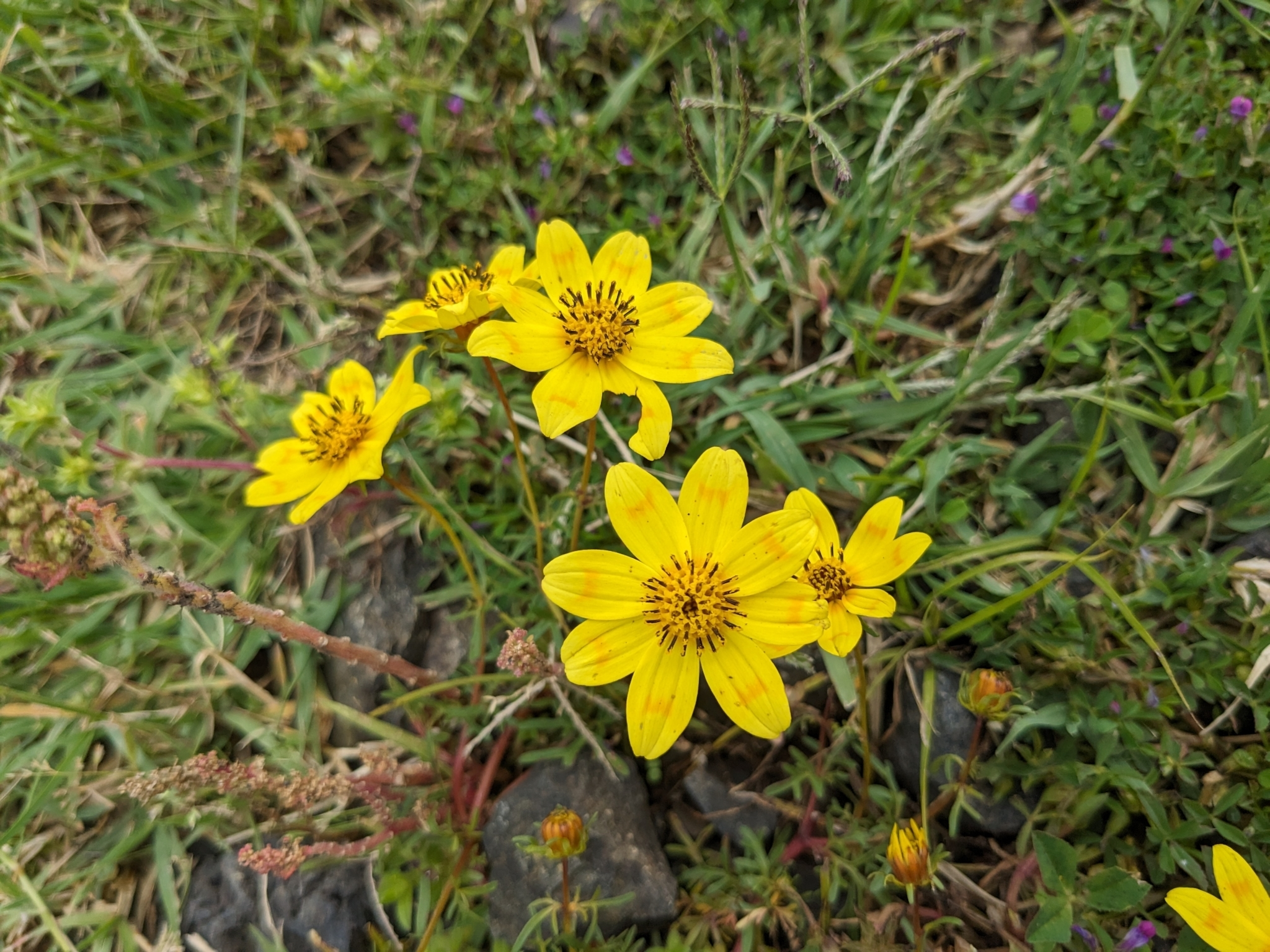

Scientific classification
- Kingdom: Plantae
- Clade: Tracheophytes
- Clade: Angiosperms
- Clade: Eudicots
- Clade: Asterids
- Order: Asterales
- Family: Asteraceae
- Genus: Bidens
- Species: B. macroptera

Binomial name
- Bidens macroptera (Sch.Bip. ex Chiov.) Mesfin

= Bidens macroptera =

Species of plant

Bidens macroptera, or adey abeba, is a flowering plant native to Ethiopia. In Ethiopia, adey abeba symbolizes the beginning of Spring (ፀደይ) and a new year called (Enkutatash) in Amharic. During (Enkutatash), a group of young girls sing the traditional new year song Abebayehosh (አበባየሁሽ) and give adey abeba to their parents and loved ones as a symbol of luck and blessing for the new year.

== Symbol ==
The flower adey abeba symbolizes not only the end of the rainy season and the start of summer but also indicates the end of a year and the beginning of a new one. it only blossoms in August and stays for two months. It's a small flower with 8 yellow petals.
