= Malga =

Malga is one of the woredas in the Southern Nations, Nationalities, and Peoples' Region (SNNPR) of Ethiopia. Part of the Sidama Zone located in the Great Rift Valley, Malga is bordered on the south by Gorche on the southwest by Shebedino, on the west by Awasa Zuria, on the north by Wondo Genet, and on the east by the Oromia Region. Malga was separated from Awasa woreda.

== Demographics ==
Based on the 2007 Census conducted by the CSA, this woreda has a total population of 109,793, of whom 55,676 are men and 54,117 women; 4,017 or 3.66% of its population are urban dwellers. The majority of the inhabitants were Protestants, with 77.78% of the population reporting that belief, 11.39% were Muslim, 4.39% were Catholic, 3.12% observed traditional religions, and 2.9% practiced Ethiopian Orthodox Christianity.
