= Wondo Genet =

Resort town in Sidama Region, Ethiopia

- Resort town
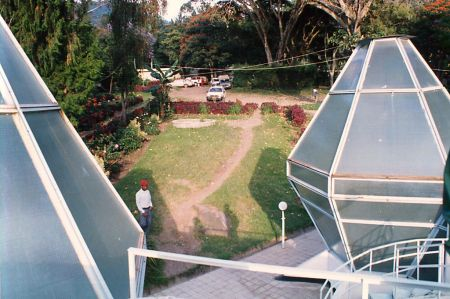
- Shebele Hotel

- Location within Ethiopia
- Coordinates: 7°1′N 38°35′E
- Country: Ethiopia
- Region: Sidama
- Elevation: 1,723 m (5,653 ft)
- Time zone: UTC+3 (EAT)

Wondo Genet (also transliterated Wendo Genet) is a resort town in Ethiopia located southeast of Shashemene in the Sidama Region with an elevation of 1723 meters.

Wondo Genet is connected to Shashamene by way of Wendo Wosha, by newly improved paved road; the last three kilometers from Wendo Wosha is a gravel road but in fairly good condition.

Based on figures from the Central Statistical Agency of Ethiopia published in 2005, Wondo Genet has an estimated total population of 5,792 consisting of 2,857 men and 2,935 women. The 1994 census reported this town had a total population of 3,197 of whom 1,582 were males and 1,615 were females. It is the main town in Wondo Genet woreda.

Wondo Genet is known for its hot springs and is surrounded by primary Ethiopian forests. It is home to an arboretum and a College of Forestry which was founded in 1977 with Swedish assistance. Also located in this resort town is the Essential Oils Research Sub Center, where spices, aromatic and medicinal plants are conserved and their qualities researched.

== History ==
The Swedish Philadelphia Church Mission opened a mission in this town in 1961, which included a medical clinic.

The Wondo Genet hotel was established in 1964, on land used as recreation site for the royal family until 1975. Emperor Haile Selassie bequeathed its name, meaning "Wondo Paradise", in reference to the beautiful panorama with a rich endowment of forests, wildlife and abundant water. Title to the hotel was transferred to the then Hotels Corporation, and currently it is a subsidiary of the Wabe Shebelle Hotels Enterprise. The hotel facilities include 54.4 ha area of land and possesses 40 bed rooms, restaurant and a bar, as well as swimming pools and access to the hot springs.

The Wendo Genet earthquake of 1983 was among the most significant in Ethiopia in the 20th century. Its magnitude has not been determined, but was severe enough that the frightened inhabitants gathered at the Ethiopian Orthodox church below the hotel to sing and pray the whole day and the whole night. A later disaster was a complex of forest fires which erupted in 17 places in southern Ethiopia on 10 February 2000 including the vicinity of the College.

On 3 April 2008, 18 people were killed in clashes near Wondo Genet between the Guji Oromo and Sidama people over ownership to grazing and farm land.
