= Shebedino =

District in Southern Nations, Nationalities, and People's Region, Ethiopia

Coordinates: 6°50′N 38°30′E

Shebedino is a woreda in Southern Nations, Nationalities, and Peoples' Region, Ethiopia. Part of the Sidama Zone located in the Great Rift Valley, Shebedino is bordered on the south by Dale, on the west by Boricha, on the north by Awasa Zuria, on the east by Gorche, and on the southeast by Wensho. Towns in Shebedino include Leku. Boricha and Gorche woredas were separated from Shebedino woreda.

According to a 2004 report, Shebedino had 17 kilometers of asphalt roads, 50 kilometers of all-weather roads and 58 kilometers of dry-weather roads, for an average road density of 121 kilometers per 1000 square kilometers.

== Demographics ==
Based on the 2007 Census conducted by the CSA, this woreda has a total population of 233,922, of whom 118,026 are men and 115,896 women; 11,831 or 5.06% of its population are urban dwellers. The majority of the inhabitants were Protestants, with 81.94% of the population reporting that belief, 8.61% were Muslim, 4.31% practiced Ethiopian Orthodox Christianity, and 2.75% were Catholic.

In the 1994 Census, this woreda had a population of 420,976, of whom 214,000 were men and 206,976 women; 10,669 or 2.53% of its population were urban dwellers. The four largest ethnic groups reported in Shebedino were the Sidama (91.43%), the Oromo (2.67%), the Amhara (2.3%), and the Welayta (2.16%); all other ethnic groups made up 1.44% of the population. Sidamo is spoken as a first language by 93.36% of the inhabitants, 2.25% speak Oromiffa, 2.13% Amharic, and 1.74% Welayta; the remaining 0.28% spoke all other primary languages reported. 61.74% of the population said they were Protestants, 15.46% were Muslim, 8.6% observed traditional religions, 6.24% embraced Catholicism, and 4.45% practiced Ethiopian Orthodox Christianity.
