= Entoto Observatory Space Science Research Center =

Astronomical observatory in Mount Entoto, Ethiopia

Entoto Observatory and Research Center
- Organization: Ethiopian Space Science and Technology Institute
- Location: Mount Entoto, near Addis Ababa, Ethiopia
- Coordinates: 9°06′30″N 38°48′27″E
- Altitude: 3,200 m (10,500 ft)
- Observing time: 3:00 (local time)
- Established: 2012
- Website: etssti.org/research-center/

The Entoto Observatory Space Science Research Center (EORC) is an astronomical observatory station located in Mount Entoto, close to Addis Ababa, Ethiopia. The centre was initiated during the establishment of the Ethiopian Space Science Society (ESSS) and officially began operations in 2012. The Board of Directors appointed Dr. Solomon Belay Tessema as the first Scientific Director in May 2012. The Ethiopian space program was born from EORC, and the strong leadership and commitment of Dr. Solomon Belay Tessema were the reasons for its creation. He has established graduate programs in four areas astronomy and astrophysics, space science, Remote sensing and Geodesy affiliated with AAU with a limited budget and resources. Dr. Solomon is the father of the space program in Ethiopia in particular East African in general.

The Entoto Observatory installed twin 1m telescopes in early 2014, and science operations began in early 2015. Final commissioning was completed by early 2015 after the installation of essential supplemental equipment. Currently, it is financed by a consortium of universities, ESSS, and the Ethiopian government. It plans to expand the center in Lalibela and other towns.

== History ==
The Entoto Observatory and Space Science Research Center (EORC) was initiated during the establishment of the Ethiopian Space Science Society (ESSS) in 2004. The first initiative was conducted by the board members of ESSS and established the Astronomy and Space Science Research center at Entoto and the Ethiopian Highlands. In 2011, the owner was asked by ESSS to develop a draft list of science initiatives to support the establishment of the center. The center was established in 2012, supported by numerous private and public universities around the world.

In 2013, the two domes for the twin telescopes were completed by deserting the trees. The Entoto Observatory has twin 1m telescope installed in early 2014, and science operations began in early 2015. Final commissioning was completed by early 2015 after installment of internet connections, scientific equipment, lighting systems, and testing equipment. Currently it is financed by a consortium of universities, ESSS and the Ethiopian government.

== Future benefit ==
The Entoto Observatory offers benefits to Ethiopian astronomers and those in the East African region. It also intended to boost research programs and a student training center. The initiative also selected a potentially ideal place such as Lalibela for a research center. Two sites have been set up with the requisite equipment (DIMMs, automatic weather stations, all sky cameras, sky brightness monitors), and infrastructure support (roads, housing) has been established.
