= Bona Zuria =

District in Sidama Region, Ethiopia

Bona Zuria is one of the woredas in the Sidama National Regional State of Ethiopia. Part of the Sidama Zone, Bona Zuria is bordered on the south by the Oromia Region, on the west by Hula, on the northwest by Bursa, on the north by Arbegona, and on the east by Bensa. The major town in Bona Zuria is Bona. Bona Zuria was separated from Arbegona woreda.

== Population ==
Based on the 2007 Census conducted by the CSA, this woreda has a total population of 121,236, of whom 61,001 are men and 60,235 women; 6,016 or 2.49% of its population are urban dwellers. The majority of the inhabitants were Protestants, with 92.44% of the population reporting that belief, 3.05% practiced Ethiopian Orthodox Christianity, 1.68% were Catholic, and 1.45% were Muslim.
