= Boricha (woreda) =

Boricha is one of the woredas in the Southern Nations, Nationalities, and Peoples' Region of Ethiopia. Part of the Sidama Zone located in the Great Rift Valley, Boricha is bordered on the south by Loko Abaya, on the west by the Wolayita Zone, on the northwest by the Oromia Region, on the northeast by Awasa Zuria, on the east by Shebedino, and on the southeast by Dale. Boricha was separated from Shebedino woreda.

== Demographics ==
Based on the 2007 Census conducted by the CSA, this woreda has a total population of 450,260, of whom 225,524 are men and 224,736 women; 10,402 or 4.16% of its population are urban dwellers. The majority of the inhabitants were Protestants, with 77.9% of the population reporting that belief, 8.94% were Catholic, 8.22% were Muslim, 1.81% observed traditional religions, and 1.14% practiced Ethiopian Orthodox Christianity.
