= Chere (woreda) =

District in Ethiopia

Chere is one of the woredas in the Southern Nations, Nationalities, and Peoples' Region of Ethiopia. Part of the Sidama Zone Chere is bordered on the south by Aroresa, on the west by Bensa, and on the north and east by the Oromia Region. Chere was separated from Aroresa woreda.

== Demographics ==
Based on the 2007 Census conducted by the CSA, this woreda has a total population of 120,449, of whom 60,535 are men and 59,914 women; 2,357 or 1.96% of its population are urban dwellers. The majority of the inhabitants were Protestants, with 96.62% of the population reporting that belief, and 2.17% were Muslim.
