= Wensho =

Region in Ethiopia

Coordinates: 6°45′N 38°30′E

Wensho is one of the woredas in the Southern Nations, Nationalities, and Peoples' Region of Ethiopia. Part of the Sidama Zone located in the Great Rift Valley, Wensho is bordered on the southwest by Aleta Wendo, on the west by Dale, on the north by Shebedino, on the northeast by Gorche, and on the southeast by Bursa. Wensho was separated from Dale woreda.

== Demographics ==
Based on the 2007 Census conducted by the CSA, this woreda has a total population of 89,662, of whom 45,562 are men and 44,100 women; 2,039 or 2.27% of its population are urban dwellers. The majority of the inhabitants were Protestants, with 70.47% of the population reporting that belief, 12.17% observed traditional religions, 8.84% were Muslim, 1.93% were Catholic, and 1.42% practiced Ethiopian Orthodox Christianity.
