= Hagere Selam (Sidama) =

Town in Sidama Region, Ethiopia

- Town
- Location within Ethiopia
- Coordinates: 6°29′N 38°31′E
- Country: Ethiopia
- Region: Southern Nations, Nationalities and Peoples'
- Zone: Sidama
- Elevation: 2,759 m (9,052 ft)

Population (2005)
  - Total: 8,491
- Time zone: UTC+3 (EAT)

Hagere Selam (Amharic: ሀገረ ሰላም) is a town in southern Ethiopia. Located in the Sidama Zone of the Southern Nations, Nationalities and Peoples' Region (or kilil), this town has a latitude and longitude of 6°29′N 38°31′E and an elevation between 2759 and 2829 meters above sea level.

This town has both telephone and postal service, and is supplied with electricity by the Ethiopian Electric Power Corporation from the national grid.

== History ==
Hagere Selam was reportedly founded in 1907 by Dejazmach Balcha Safo, to serve as the capital of Sidamo Province. His court was described by John Boyes: "The apartment was large and handsomely appointed, the floor covered with Turkish carpets, and the ceiling composed of reed work of various colours in a circular design. Above the throne was a canopy, lined with red and draped with red curtains. The general kept his court with something like royal state."

Dejazmach Balcha soon left to govern Harar for three years, returning to Hagere Selam in 1916. Ras Desta Damtew in the 1930s moved the provincial capital to Irgalem after he became governor, because Irgalem was more conveniently situated on a motorable road.

Hagere Selam was occupied 11 December 1936 by a column of the Italian Laghi Division which advanced south from Aleta Wendo. The Italians renamed the town Hula, in order to avoid Amharic names. Within a few years the Guida dell'Africa Orientale Italiana described the town as an important market for coffee, hides, and cattle. Amenities included the Vice residenza, telegraph, infirmary, restaurant, and spacci. Of the four churches in Hagere Selam, Kidane Mihret was the principal one followed by medhanialem, Silassie and Giorgyes. The Italians started construction of a mosque at this time. The town was retaken by elements of the British 11th (African) Division on 18 May 1941.

A station of the Norwegian Evangelical Mission NLM at Hagere Selam, founded in 1953, claimed around 1962 to be the Norwegian missionary station with the highest altitude.

== Demographics ==
Based on figures from the Central Statistical Agency in 2005, Hagere Selam has an estimated total population of 8,491 of whom 4,176 were males and 4,315 were females. The 1994 national census reported this town had a total population of 4686 of whom 2,312 were males and 2,374 were females. It is the largest settlement in Hula woreda.
