= Entoto Natural Park =

Natural park in Addis Ababa, Ethiopia

- እንጦጦ ፓርክ
- Interactive map of Entoto Natural Park
- Type: Natural park
- Location: Mount Entoto, Addis Ababa, Ethiopia
- Coordinates: 9.08664°N 38.76242°E
- Area: 1,300 hectares (3,200 acres)
- Created: 10 October 2020
- Status: Active
- Website: www.entoto-natural-park.org

Entoto Natural Park (Amharic: እንጦጦ ፓርክ) is a natural park located northeast of Addis Ababa, Ethiopia on the southeastern slopes of Mount Entoto, covering an area of 1,300 hectares. It is situated at an altitude of between 2,600 and 3,100 meters.

== Overview ==
Entoto Natural Park had limited infrastructure and remained underdeveloped. In an effort to enhance its facilities and elevate its status as a tourist destination, The Entoto Project was initiated by Prime Minister Abiy Ahmed, in conjunction with The Sheger River side project. The development was completed within a year and officially opened on October 10, 2020, as a component of the broader Beautifying Sheger project.
