= Gorche =

Gorche is one of the woredas in the Southern Nations, Nationalities, and Peoples' Region of Ethiopia. Part of the Sidama Zone located in the Great Rift Valley, Gorche is bordered on the southwest by Wensho, on the west by Shebedino, on the north by Malga, on the east by the Oromia Region, and on the southeast by Arbegona. Gorche was separated from Shebedino woreda.

== Demographics ==
Based on the 2007 Census conducted by the CSA, this woreda had a total population of 105,472, of whom 53,484 were men and 51,988 women; 2,986 or 2.83% of its population were urban dwellers. The majority of the inhabitants were Protestants, with 78.92% of the population reporting that belief, 6.61% observed traditional religions, 6.48% were Muslim, and 5.81% were Catholic.
