= Bursa (woreda) =

District in Sidama Region, Ethiopia

Bursa is one of the woredas in the Sidama National Regional state of Ethiopia. Part of the Southern Sidama Zone, Bursa is bordered on the south by Hula, on the west by Aleta Wendo, on the northwest by Wensho, on the northeast by Arbegona, and on the southeast by Bona Zuria. Bursa was separated from Hula woreda.

== Demographics ==
Based on the 2007 Census conducted by the CSA, this woreda has a total population of 103,631, of whom 51,731 are men and 51,900 women; 2,304 or 2.22% of its population are urban dwellers. The majority of the inhabitants were Protestants, with 88.63% of the population reporting that belief, 6.25% observed traditional religions, 2.18% were Catholic, and 1.77% were Muslim.
