= Model Mugging =

Self-defense training technique

- Focus: Hybrid
- Country of origin: United States

Model Mugging is an American form of self-defense training that uses padded instructors, known as "Model Muggers", to simulate assaults. It was founded by Matt Thomas, and developed by Danielle Smith, Julio Toribio, Sheryl Doran and Mark Morris. Its inspiration was the 1971 rape and beating that happened to a Karate black belt. Model Mugging attempts to turn the adrenaline reaction to an active response rather than a fear response through simulated attacks and group talk sessions.

== Techniques and training ==
Model mugging training involves students role-playing and sometimes fighting through a variety of assault scenarios. Students are taught physical defenses, methods of avoiding or defusing potential assaults, verbal defenses, and decision-making under the pressure of such situations.

During the simulated assaults, heavily padded instructors, often referred to as muggers, accost, grab, or directly attack a student, who may respond (if they believe a physical response is appropriate for the situation) with full-force attacks to the padded instructor. The emotionally charged nature of the scenarios combined with the full-force nature of the fighting tend to create an adrenalized state similar to that of someone facing a real assault. The adrenalized nature of the training is intended to teach the student how to think clearly and respond in adrenalized situations.

== History ==
Model Mugging received significant publicity beginning in the late 1970s and 1980s. The first major public recognition was described in 1978 within Human Behavior Magazine, and The Chronicle of Higher Education.

Popularity of the Model Mugging program expanded rapidly after an article was published in Black Belt magazine describing the innovative training system. Many other publications and supporters began providing positive press coverage, and especially in People magazine. The program was widely publicized in many other popular magazines and media such as Life magazine, Glamour magazine and others.

By 1990, some female instructors stated that women were traumatized by the course or sexually assaulted by Model Mugging male instructors. After several incidents of private lessons that founder Matt Thomas gave to female instructors of the Model Mugging program in his home led to allegations that he had acted inappropriately, the national board of Model Mugging instituted new rules prohibiting the practice. Women who had made the allegations broke from the Model Mugging program being taught at Stanford and formed their own self-defense organizations.

In 1990, psychologist Albert Bandura used Model Mugging for a psychology study where he and Elizabeth Ozer tested the hypotheses that "perceived coping and cognitive control self-efficacy govern the effects of personal empowerment over physical threats". The women participated in a mastery modeling self-defense program in which they sought to learn the physical skills to defend themselves successfully against unarmed sexual assailants.
