= Sidama Region =

Regional state of Ethiopia

Coordinates: 6°40′N 38°30′E

Sidama Region: Sidaamu Qoqqowo (Sidamo); ሲዳማ ክልል (Amharic)
- Regional state
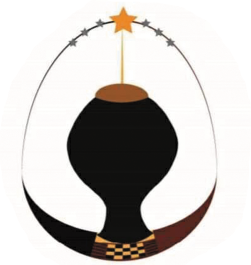
- Flag Seal

- Map of Ethiopia showing the Sidama Region
- Country: Ethiopia
- Referendum: 20 November 2019
- Formation: 18 June 2020
- Capital: Hawassa

Government
  - Chief Administrator: Messay Hailu (Dr.)

Area
  - Total: 6,538.17 km^{2} (2,524.40 sq mi)
  - Rank: 10

Population (2025)
  - Total: 4,868,000
  - Rank: 3
  - Density: 744.6/km^{2} (1,928/sq mi)
- ISO 3166 code: ET-SI

The Sidama Region (Sidama: Sidaamu Qoqqowo; Amharic: ሲዳማ ክልል) is a regional state in southern Ethiopia. It was formed on 18 June 2020 from the Southern Nations, Nationalities, and Peoples' Region (SNNPR) and transformation of the Sidama Zone after a 98.52% vote in favour of increased autonomy in the 2019 Sidama referendum. It is the second smallest regional state in the country, after Harari. Sidama is the name of both the Sidama people, the language, and the territory. Sidama is bordered to the south by the Oromia Region (except for a short stretch in the middle where it shares a border with Gedeo zone, in South Ethiopia Regional State, on the west by the Bilate River, which separates it from Wolayita Zone, and on the north and east by the Oromia Region. Towns in Sidama include Hawassa, the capital of Sidama and of SNNPR when it existed, Yirgalem, Wondogenet, Chuko, Hula, Bona, Bursa, Bensa, and Aleta Wendo. Sidama has a population of around 3.2 million in 2017 who speak the Cushitic language Sidama (also known as Sidaamu Afoo).

== Political history ==
Historically, the Sidama nation was administered by the indigenous moote political system. The Mootichcha, equivalent to a king, was nominated by the family and near relatives for the position. The nominated moote ('king') is presented to a Fichche, the Sidama New Year ceremony. The Mootichcha is the head of the political and administrative structure. The Mootichcha is assisted by Ga'ro, akin to the king's assistant, and hence next to the former in politico-administrative authority.

After the fall of the Derg military regime, the Sidama people were able to widely use the local language – Sidaamu Afoo – as exercised in all regions of the country. Hawassa has been serving as the capital city of Sidama since 1978 and SNNPR since 1993. Recently, the government of Ethiopia planned to make Hawassa a chartered city with its own administrative structure, rather than having the city serve as the capital for SNNPR and Sidama region. For this reason, the Sidama people requested the government to consider creating a separate region for the Sidama people, rather than combining them with other ethnic groups in the SNNPR. Peaceful demonstrators came into conflict with armed government workers and several dozen of them were killed.

There are several justifications for the argument for regional autonomy. First, Sidama constitutes about 20% of the total population in the southern region, with a significant economic contribution to the central government. Second, the 40 smaller ethnic groups in the region belong to the three main socio-cultural and linguistic groups, namely Cushitic groups: Sidama, Alaba, Tambaro, Qewenna, Danta (Dubamo), Maraqo, Konso, Hadiya, Kambata; Omotic groups: Wolaitans, Gamo, Gofa, Dawuro, Konta, etc., and Semitic group: Gurage. After the fall of the military regime in 1991, the Transitional Government endorsed five separate regions within the current SNNPR. These regions were established based on socio-cultural, linguistic and economic similarities. They followed similar administrative arrangements made by the previous regime shortly before its fall. Sidama, Gedeo and Burji belonged to one of the five independent regions within the current SNNPR. However, those five regions were dissolved without consultation with the peoples of the region. Third, a proper administrative arrangement is essential for administrative efficacy, effective delivery of social and economic services and broader economic development. In August 2019, Ethiopia granted the Sidama community a referendum on self-determination on 20 November, which was passed with 98.5% of the vote.

== Geography ==
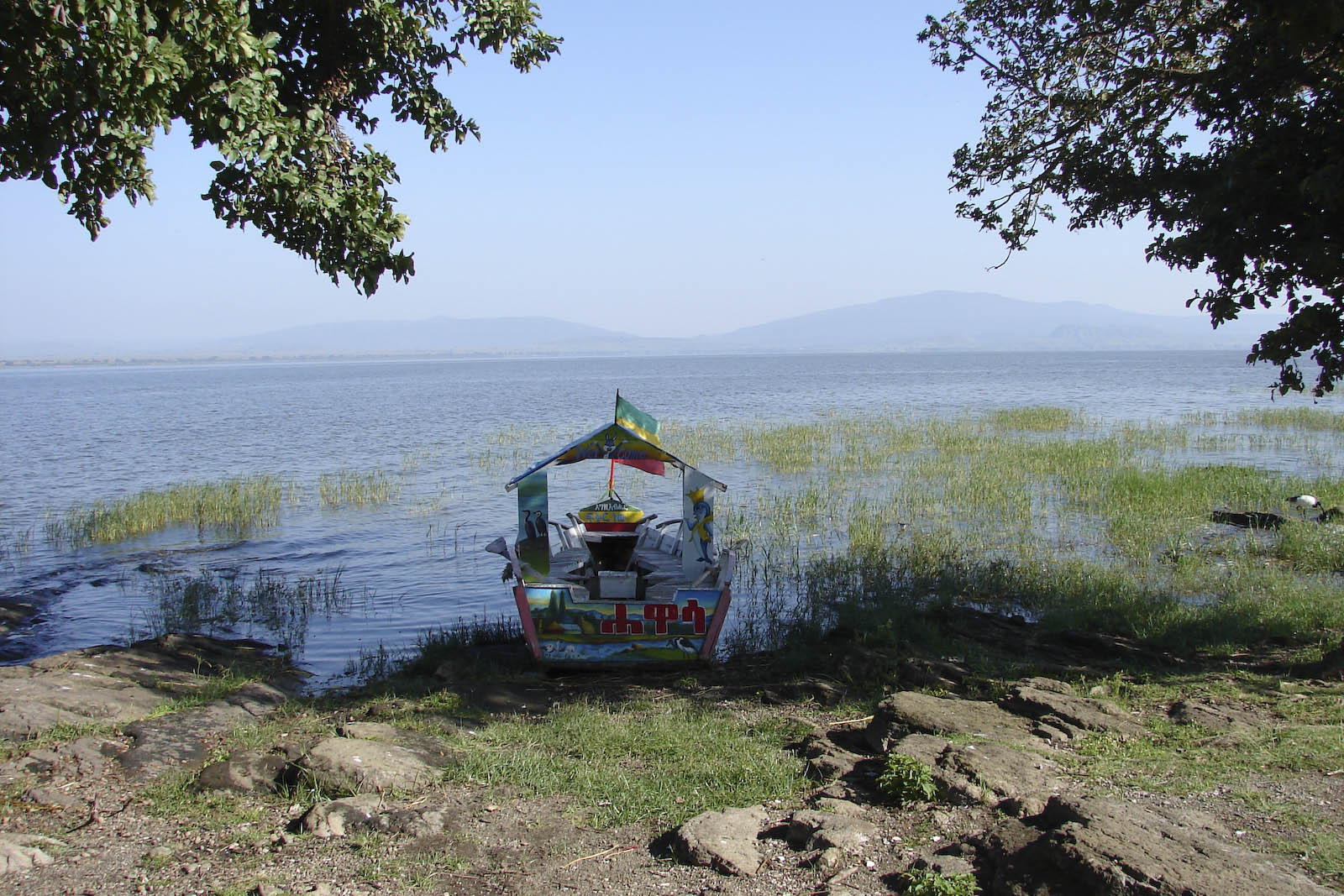
Boat at the shore of Lake Hawassa.

Sidama Region is northeast of Lake Abaya and southeast of Lake Hawassa. Sidama is bordered on the south by the Oromia Region (except for a short stretch in the middle where it shares a border with Gedeo zone), on the west by the Bilate River, which separates it from Wolayita Zone, and on the north and east by the Oromia. The Sidama live between Tikur Wuha River in the north and Dilla town in the south, spread out in a cone-shaped area of the middle of southern Ethiopia. Sidama is generally a fertile area, varying from flat land (warm to hot) to highland (warm to cold).

Sidama has geographic coordinates of latitude, North: 5'45" and 6'45" and longitude, East, 38' and 39'. It has a total area of 10,000 km^{2}, of which 97.71% is land and 2.29% is covered by water. Hawassa Lake and Logita falls are water bodies that attract tourists. Of the land, 48.70% is cultivated, 2.29% is forested, 5.04% is shrub and bushland, 17.47% is grazing land, 18.02% is uncultivated, 6.38% is unproductive and 2.10% has other uses. Some of the cultivated lands are in undulating escarpment and create difficulties for the farmers in the area.

Sidama has a variety of climatic conditions. Warm conditions cover 54% of the area. Locally known as Gamoojje or Woinadega, this is a temperate zone ranging from an elevation of 1500 m to 2500 m above sea level. The mean annual rainfall of the area varies between 1200 mm and 1599 mm, with 15 °C to 19.9 °C average annual temperature. A hot climatic zone, Kolla, covers 30% of the total area. Its elevation ranges from 500 m to 1500 m above sea level. It has a mean annual rainfall of 400 mm to 799 mm, and the mean annual temperature ranges from 20 °C to 24.9 °C. Cool climatic conditions known as Aliicho or Dega exist in the mountainous highlands. This covers 16% of the total area with an elevation between 2500 m and 3500 m above sea level. This part gets the highest amount of rainfall, ranging from 1600 mm to 1999 mm. It has a mean annual temperature of 15 °C to 19.9 °C.

== Demographics ==
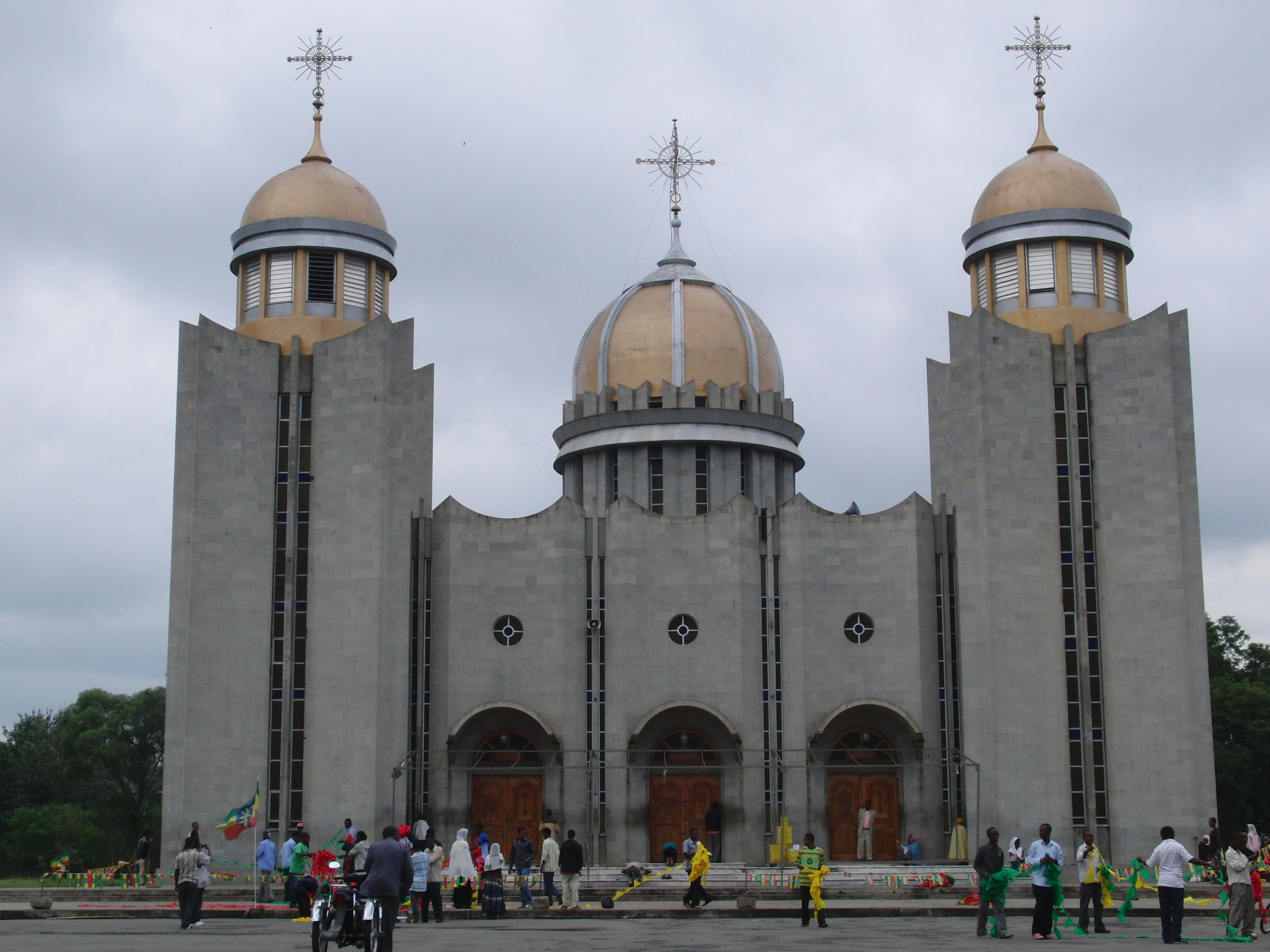
Ethiopian Orthodox St Gabriel Church, Awasa

Based on the 2007 census by the CSA, the region has a total population of 2,954,136, of whom 1,491,248 are men and 1,462,888 women; with an area of 6,538.17 square kilometers, Sidama has a population density of 451.83. While 162,632 or 5.51% are urban inhabitants, a further 5,438 or 0.18% are pastoralists. A total of 592,539 households were counted in this region, which results in an average of 4.99 persons to a household, and 566,926 housing units. The three largest ethnic groups reported in this region were the Sidama (93.01%), the Oromo (2.53%), and the Amhara (1.91%); all other ethnic groups made up 2.55% of the population. Sidamo is spoken as a first language by 94.23% of the inhabitants, 2.14% speak Amharic, and 2.07% Oromiffa; the remaining 1.56% spoke all other primary languages reported. 84.38% of the population said they were Protestants, 4.62% were Muslim, 3.35% practiced Ethiopian Orthodox Christianity, 3.01% embraced Catholicism, and 2.72% observed traditional religions.

In the 1994 census, Sidama had a population of 2,044,836 in 439,057 households, of whom 1,039,587 were men and 1,005,249 women; 143,534 or 7.02% of its population were urban dwellers. The four largest ethnic groups reported in this region were the Sidama (88.6%), the Amhara (4.15%), the Oromo (2.97%), and the Wolaitans (1.84%); all other ethnic groups made up 2.44% of the population. Sidama is spoken as a first language by 88.6% of the inhabitants, 4.15% speak Amharic, 2.97% Oromiffa, and 1.84% Wolayttattuwa; the remaining 2.44% spoke all other primary languages reported. 62.54% of the population said they were Protestants, 13.64% observed traditional religions, 8.24% practiced Ethiopian Orthodox Christianity, 8% were Muslim, and 4.24% embraced Catholicism.

According to a 24 May 2004, World Bank memorandum, 8% of the inhabitants of Sidama have access to electricity, this region has a road density of 137.4 kilometers per 1000 square kilometers (compared to the national average of 30 kilometers), the average rural household has 0.3 hectare of land (compared to the national average of 1.01 hectare of land and an average of 0.89 for the SNNPR) and the equivalent of 0.5 heads of livestock. 15.4% of the population is in non-farm related jobs, compared to the national average of 25% and a regional average of 32%. 68% of all eligible children are enrolled in primary school, and 18% in secondary schools. 72% of the region is exposed to malaria, and none to tsetse fly. The memorandum gave this region a drought risk rating of 329.

== Administrative divisions ==
The Sidama Region is administratively divided into four zones and the zone-level city of Hawassa; which in turn are subdivided into districts (woredas) and city administrations:

- Central Sidama Zone
  - Arbegona
  - Dale
  - Darara
  - Irgalem (town)
  - Loko Abaya
  - Shafamo
  - Wensho (Wonsho)
- Eastern Sidama Zone
  - Aroresa
  - Bensa
  - Bona Zuria
  - Bura
  - Chabe Gambeltu
  - Chere
  - Daela
  - Daye (town)
  - Hoko
- Northern Sidama Zone
  - Bilate Zuria
  - Boricha
  - Gorche
  - Hawassa Zuria
  - Leku (town)
  - Malga
  - Shebedino
  - Wondo Genet
- Southern Sidama Zone
  - Aleta Wendo
  - Aleta Wendo (town)
  - Bursa
  - Chuko
  - Dara
  - Dara Otilcho
  - Hula
  - Teticha
- Hawassa (city)
  - Addis Ketema sub-city
  - Hayk Dar sub-city
  - Mehal sub-city
  - Menahariya sub-city
  - Misrak sub-city
  - Tabor sub-city
  - Hawela Tula sub-city
  - Bahil Adarash sub-city

== Economy ==
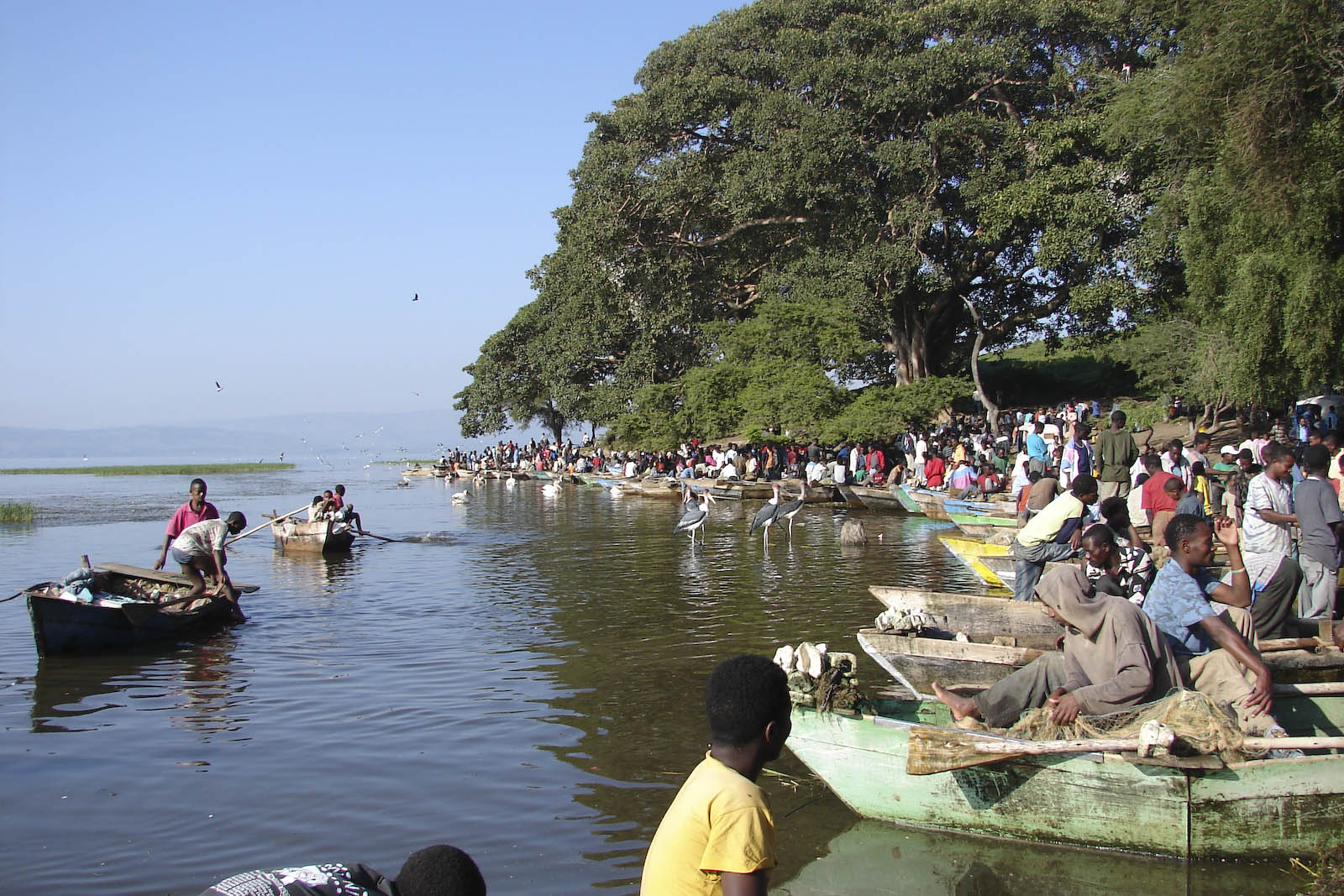
Fish market

Most residents are subsistence farmers. Cattle especially, are a measure of wealth. Sidama grows several crop types. It is a major coffee-growing area, with coffee the most popular agricultural product in the region. Its prized coffee is sold on the world market. Coffee exports contribute to the country's revenue and foreign exchange and the production and exchange of coffee has been used as the main economic power of people living in Sidama. Despite Ethiopia's vast resources of land, water and labor, it remains among the poorest countries in Africa and the world. It has been unable to use its resources effectively to prevent famine, reduce poverty, and support its rapidly increasing population.

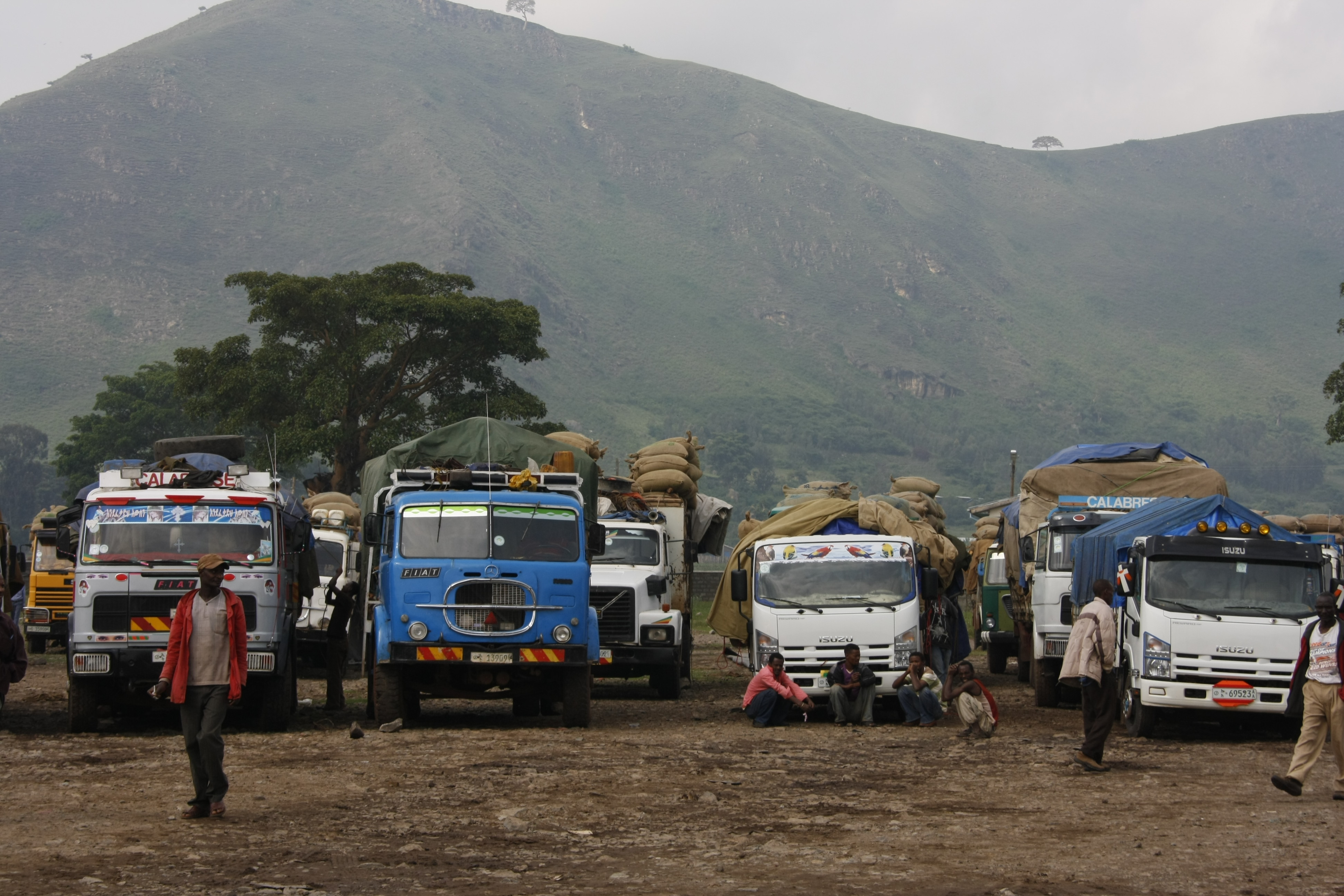
Trucks carrying bags of coffee beans at the Hawassa warehouse.

The Sidama economy is based primarily on subsistence agriculture characterized by archaic production techniques. However, coffee has been the major source of income for rural households in a substantial part of Sidama, although the recent plunge in international coffee price drew most of these households back into the subsistence production and absolute poverty (coffee prices fell dramatically even during the commodity price boom of 2001 to mid-2008). Sidama is one of the major coffee-producing regions in Ethiopia. It supplies over 40% of washed coffee to the central market. Coffee is the single major export earner for the country. Export earnings from coffee ranges from 60 to 67% although the country's share in the world market is less than 3%. The Sidama people have not faced major hunger and famine until very recently. Due to reliable rainfall and evergreen land area, they were always able to produce enough to ensure food security. The society has been characterized by what one may call a low-level economic equilibrium. Even the 1984 great famine that hit all other parts of the country did not have a major impact in Sidama. However, a continued dependence on subsistence agriculture, which relies on archaic technology and vagaries of nature coupled with massive growth of rural population, and limited rural development, has made Sidama prone to frequent hunger and famine recently. Thus about a quarter of the total population in Sidama is directly or indirectly dependent on food aid from the international community today.

Sidama Region is the leading coffee-producing region in Ethiopia, which contributes greatly to the foreign exchange of the federal government. The Central Statistical Agency (CSA) reported that 63,562 tons of coffee were produced in Sidama and Gedeo combined in the year ending in 2005, based on inspection records from the Ethiopian Coffee and Tea authority. This represents 63% of the SNNPR's output and 28% of Ethiopia's total output.

The region is also rich in water resources, which are underutilized. The leading causes of morbidity and mortality in SNNP Region are mostly attributable to lack of clean drinking water, poor sanitation, and low public awareness of environmental health and personal hygiene practices.

There is a high value attached to livestock by the Sidama, among whom a person without cattle is not regarded as a fully-grown social person, but as an outcast.

== Health ==
Access to water supply and sanitation in Ethiopia is amongst the lowest in Sub-Saharan Africa and the entire world. According to a 2009 IRC baseline KPC survey conducted in the Sidama region, only 7% of households reported using a latrine, whilst 93% percent practiced open defecation. There have been outbreaks of acute watery diarrhea in Sidama. The 2009–2011 Emergency Preparedness and Response Plan (EPRP) for SNNPR estimated that up to 65,260 people were affected by acute watery diarrhea in 2009.

Health extension workers (HEWs) and community health promoters (CHPs) play the greatest role in disseminating hygiene and sanitation education to the whole community in rural areas. "The preventive elements of the HEWs' and CHPs' roles involves continuous education on sanitation and hygiene to communities, including selection and communication of messages on sanitation and hygiene as well as demonstrations and actions to persuade HHs [households] to make changes in their behaviour – followed by monitoring of the progress made by HHs." To assemble site-specific processes of development in each community, a large environment needs to be in place to encourage local groups to create their own appropriate solutions. Community members receive good awareness about the importance of community involvement in different processes and community members collaborate with the government and start to solve their water, hygiene and sanitation (WASH)-related problems through participatory learning and action.

== Education ==
In the Sidama region, due to less community awareness and lower availability of schools, a smaller percentage of young children attend education. In the Sidama region there are currently 75 kindergartens, 633 primary schools and 12 secondary schools. Considering kindergarten enrollment, a total number of 6,863 students (3,700 male and 3,163 female) attend class. Total school age (4–6 years age) boys and girls are about 360,547 (181,543 male and 179,004 female), however. The gross enrollment ratio (%) in kindergarten is about 1.9% (2.04% for males and 1.77% for females). The data reveals that many fewer children in the younger generation receive educational opportunities in the Sidama region.

== Environmental status ==
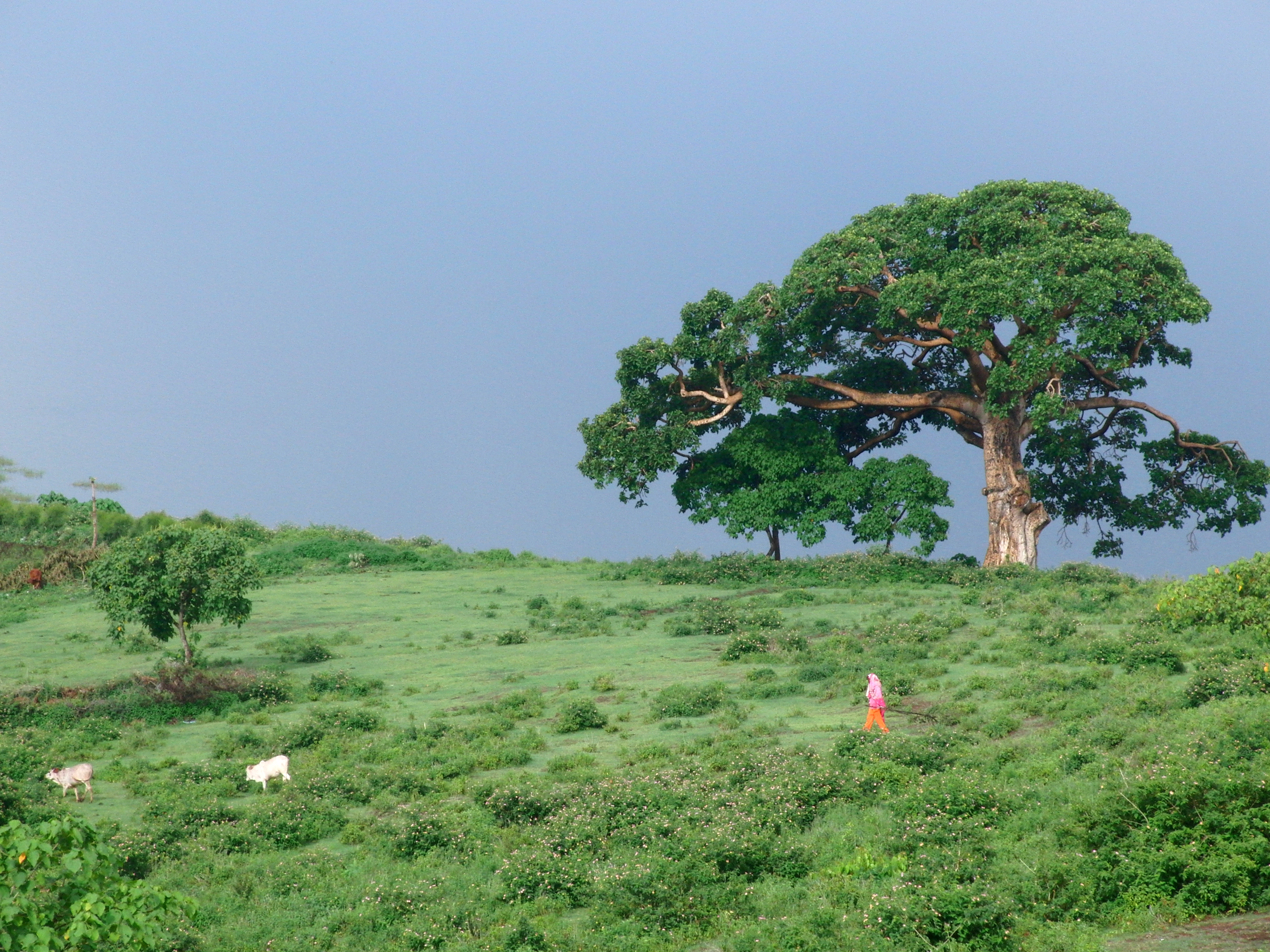
Top of Hawassa Hill.

The prevalent farming system of the midlands of Sidama is under stress mainly because of burgeoning human population. Symptoms are not only the high proportion of children acutely or chronically affected by malnutrition but also the progressive degradation of resources in an environment once extremely fertile. Land erosion is commonly observed by farmers who consider it a major problem though in some plots nutrients surplus, as unused manure, was observed. Hurni (1988) classified soil erosion in Sidama as medium (20–40%). Pastureland is shrinking and degrading in its botanical composition. Most of the abundant water resources are now polluted. In order to buffer the progressive crisis, and given the presence of markets for cash crops and dairy products, the mixed system in the Sidama midlands is rapidly evolving into specialization. The area is among the richest in Ethiopia (MOA, 1984). Because of their positive role as a source of cash in the HH economy, coffee and khat plants are gradually replacing food crops in the garden such as ensete, yam and maize.

== Culture ==
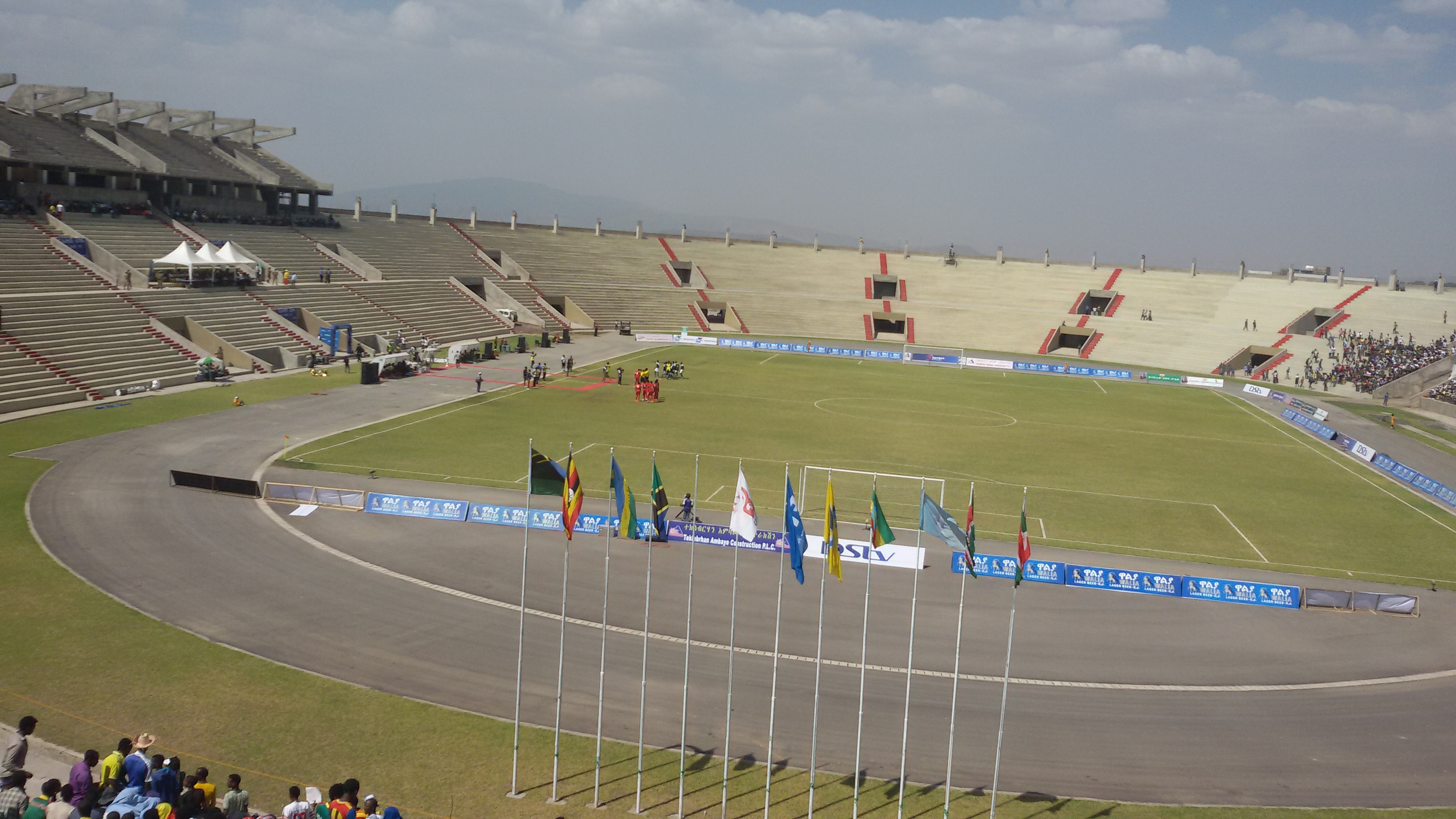
Hawassa Stadium

Fichchee is the most celebrated Sidama cultural holiday, representing the Sidama New Year. Fichchee is based on the lunar system. Sidama elders (astrologists) observe the movement of the stars in the sky and decide the date for the New Year and the Fichchee celebration. The Sidama New Year is therefore unique in that it does not have a fixed date. It rotates every year following the movements of the stars. Sidama has 13 months in a year, and each of the months is divided equally into 28 days, while the 13th month has 29 days. This is because the Sidama week has only four days and hence each month has seven weeks instead of the conventional four weeks. The names of the four days in the Sidama week are called Dikko, Deela, Qawadoo and Qawalanka, to be followed by Dikko, completing the cycle of a four-day week.

== Transport ==
Sidama has 879 kilometres of all-weather roads and 213 kilometres of dry-weather roads, for an average road density of 161 kilometres per 1,000 square kilometres.

== See also ==
- Cushitic languages
- Sidama people
