= Entoto Maryam Church =

Church in Mount Entoto, Ethiopia

- እንጦጦ ማርያም ቤተክርስቲያን
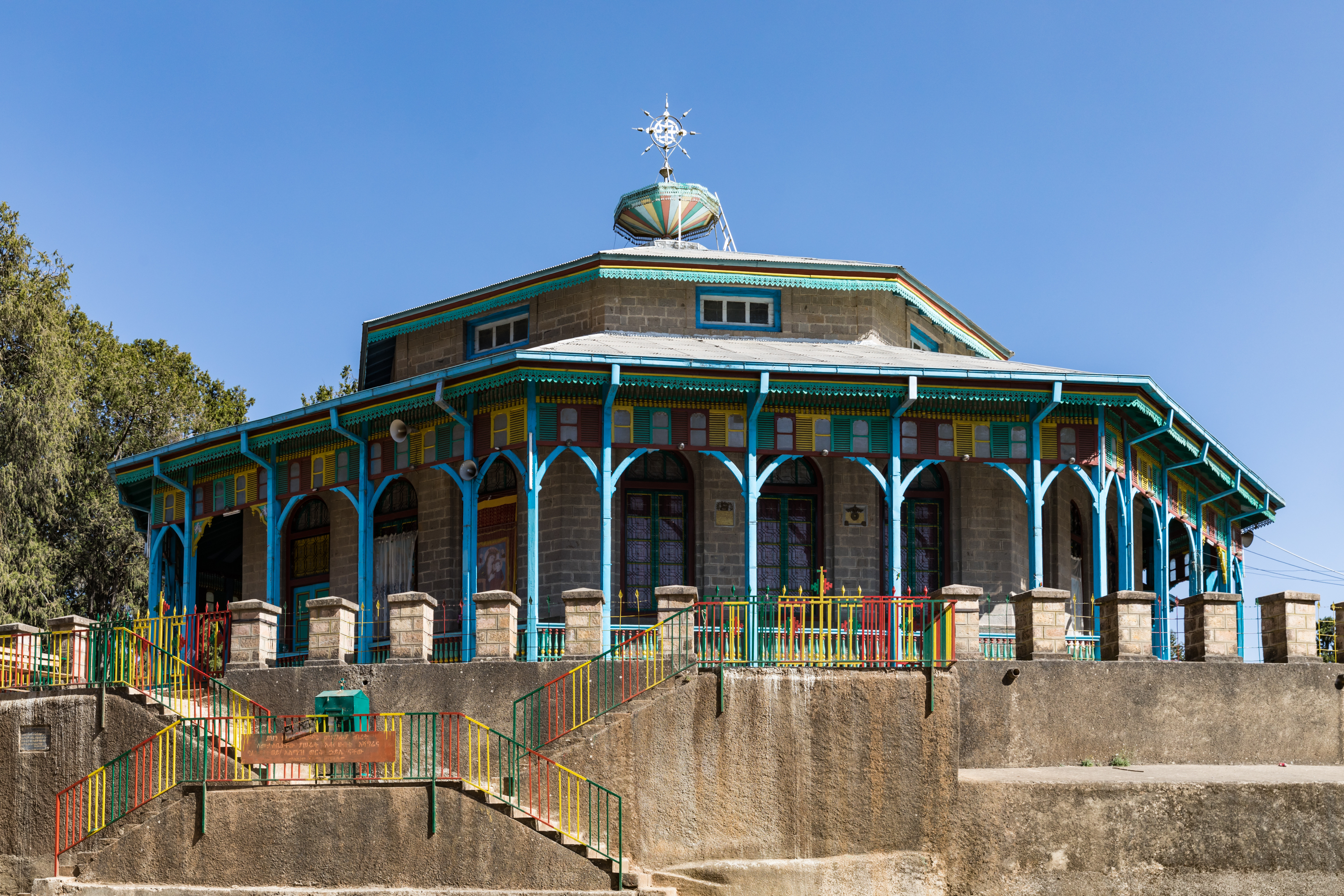
- Entoto Maryam Church
- 9.089430°N 38.763641°E
- Location: Mount Entoto
- Country: Ethiopia
- Denomination: Ethiopian Orthodox Tewahedo Church

History
- Founder: Menelik II

Architecture
- Style: Ethiopian architecture
- Years built: 1877

Entoto Maryam Church (Amharic: እንጦጦ ማርያም ቤተክርስቲያን) is one of the oldest Ethiopian Orthodox Tewahedo Churches on the Entoto Hills, 2.5 km away from Addis Ababa, Ethiopia. It was built in 1877 by Emperor Menelik II and the burial place of Menelik and his wife Empress Taytu. Several royal artifacts of the emperor and empress also found in this church.

== Description ==
The church was built in 1877 by Emperor Menelik II characterized by octagonal domes. Founded on the Entoto Hills about 2.5 km away, it is one of the oldest churches in Addis Ababa, and the burial places of Menelik and his wife Taytu in a tomb called "Shera Bet" built in 1918. Eucalyptus trees are available through the church. The museum next to the church is the personal belongings of Menelik and Taytu including some traditional costumes of the crowns, their royal bed, jewels owned by the royal family, and a mirror presented by Queen Victoria to Empress Taytu.

In the church, there is also holy water produced by spring whereby priests aid by baptize people.
