= Wondo Genet (woreda) =

District in Sidama Region, Ethiopia

Wondo Genet is a woreda in Sidama Region, Ethiopia. Part of the Sidama Zone located in the Great Rift Valley, Wondo Genet is bordered on the south by Malga, on the west by Awasa Zuria, and on the north and east by the Oromia Region. The administrative center is Wondo Genet. Wondo Genet was part of former Awasa woreda.

== Demographics ==
Based on the 2007 Census conducted by the CSA, this woreda has a total population of 155,715, of whom 79,664 are men and 76,051 women; 23,125 or 14.85% of its population are urban dwellers. The majority of the inhabitants were Protestants, with 83.26% of the population reporting that belief, 7.4% were Muslim, 6.69% practiced Ethiopian Orthodox Christianity, and 1.68% were Catholic.
