= Chuko (woreda) =

District in Sidama Region, Ethiopia

Aleta Chuko is one of the woredas in the Sidama Region of Ethiopia. It has twenty-seven kebeles including Qorke, Rufo, Loko, Gure, Dongora, Siqee, Teso, and Chuko Town (chuko01 & chuko02). There are also two further kebeles considered part of Aleta Chuko, bringing the total to twenty-nine. Aleta Chuko's main economic exports are coffee, inseti (kochoo), pineapple, and chat. The woreda has an irrigational dam on the Gidawo river which supports the agricultural cultivation of various fruits; such as mangoes, pineapples, oranges, and avocados.

== Location ==
Aleta Chuko is located within 6460'- 6720' N and 3820'-3856'E Longitude and Latitude respectively.

Aleta Chuko is bordered on the south by Dara, on the southwest by the Oromia Region, on the west by Loka Abaya, on the north by Dale, and on the east by Aleta Wendo. The administrative center is Chuko. Chuko was separated from Aleta Wendo woreda.

== Population ==
Based on the 2007 Census conducted by the CSA, this woreda has a total population of 167,300, of whom 85,928 are men and 81,372 women; 5,673 or 3.39% of its population are urban dwellers. The majority of the inhabitants were Protestants, with 90.95% of the population reporting that belief, 2.4% practiced Ethiopian Orthodox Christianity, 2.27% were Catholic, 2.09% observed traditional religions, and 1.05% were Muslim.
