= Northern Sidama Zone =

Zone in Sidama Region

- Zone
- Country: Ethiopia
- Region: Sidama
- Capital: Hawassa

Government
  - Party leader: Demissie Esatu (Prosperity Party)
- Time zone: UTC+3 (EAT)

Northern Sidama is an administrative zone in Sidama Region. The zone is formed up on resolution passed by Sidama regional state council at its third round meeting of the first year in 2022. Northern Sidama is bordered on the south by Central Sidama Zone, on the north and east by the Oromia region and west by the Wolayita Zone. The administrative centre of Northern Sidama Zone is Hawassa.
