= Aleta Wendo =

Place in Sidama Region, Ethiopia

- Town
- Location within Ethiopia
- Coordinates: 6°36′N 38°25′E
- Country: Ethiopia
- Region: Sidama
- Elevation: 2,037 m (6,683 ft)

Population (2005)
  - Total: 20,513
- Time zone: UTC+3 (EAT)
- Climate: Cfb

Aleta Wendo (also known as Wendo) is a town in southern Ethiopia. Located in a fertile and forested area near Lake Abaya in the upper Gidabo River basin, not far from the sources of the Ganale Dorya and Dawa Rivers in the Aleta Wendo Zone of the Sidama Regional State, this town has a longitude and latitude of 6°36′N 38°25′E with an elevation of 2037 meters above sea level. It is the administrative center of Aleta Wendo woreda.

This town has both telephone and postal service, and is supplied with electricity by the Ethiopian Electric Power Corporation from the national grid.

== History ==
Dejazmach Balcha Safo, Governor of Sidamo, originally constructed his ketema, or fortified camp, in Wendo, but he later moved it to Hagere Selam. While passing through the area in February 1909, Dr. Drake Brockman notes that the governor of Western Sidamo, Dejazmach Tessema Nadew, made this town (which he calls "Alata") his headquarters. American naturalists arrived at Wendo village on 29 December 1926, and camped outside the village for a while. Grazmach Kebede Dihala Mikael, the village potentate, implored them to camp near his house, explaining that there were plenty of shiftas or outlaws in the area.

Wendo was occupied by the Italian Laghi Division on 30 November 1936. It was retaken by the 1st Gold Coast Regiment on 22 May 1941, without a single shot fired. The Allied forces accepted the surrender of a Brigadier General and some 3,000 prisoners.

By 1958, Wendo was one of 27 places in Ethiopia ranked as a First Class Township. Telephone service reached the town within the next 10 years.

== Demographics ==
Based on figures from the Central Statistical Agency in 2005, Aleta Wendo has an estimated total population of 20,513, of whom 10,006 were males and 10,507 were females. According to the 1994 national census, the town had a population of 11,300.
