= Mount Entoto =

Peak of Entoto Mountains, Ethiopia

Coordinates: 9°6′56″N 38°46′20″E

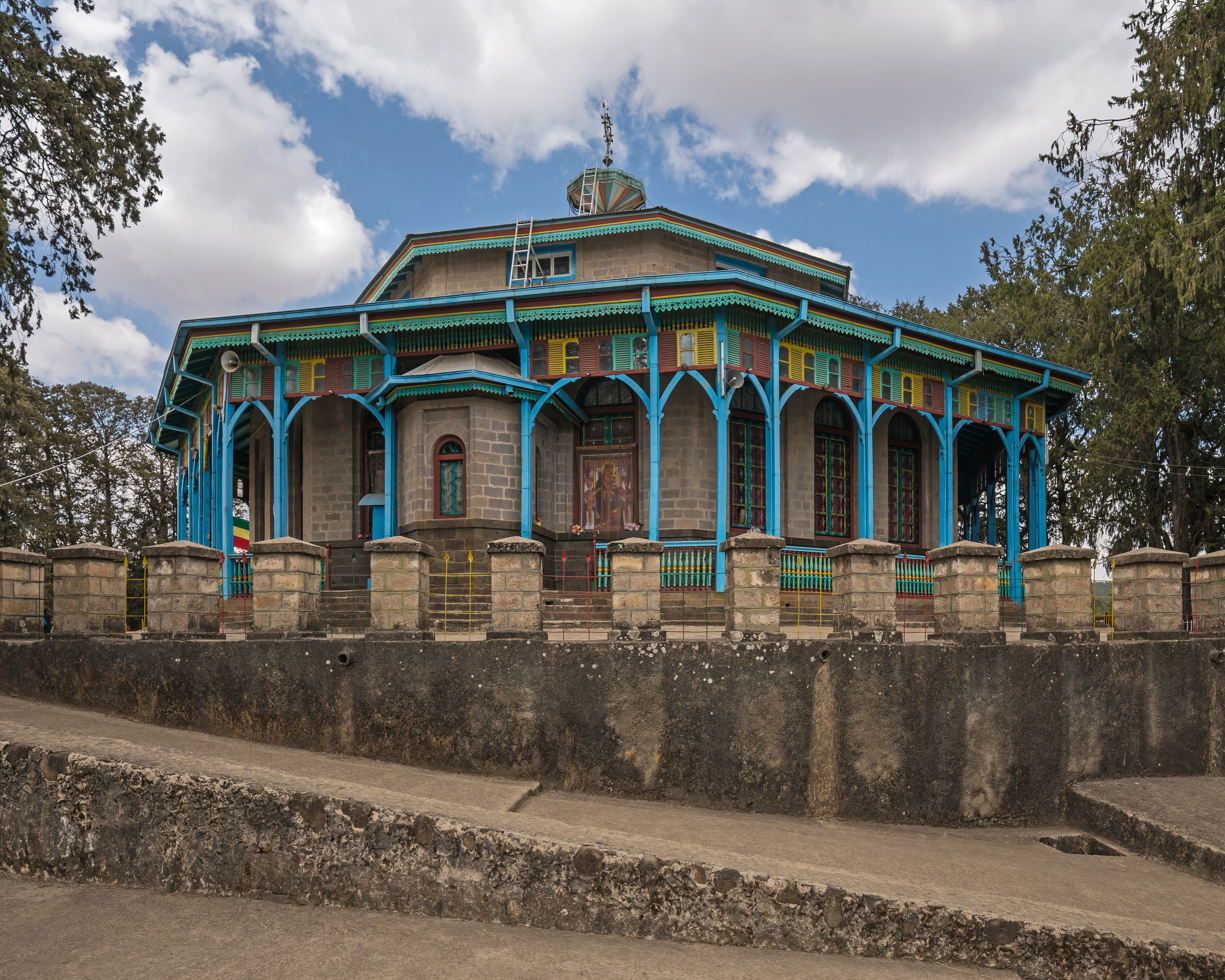
Entoto Maryam Church

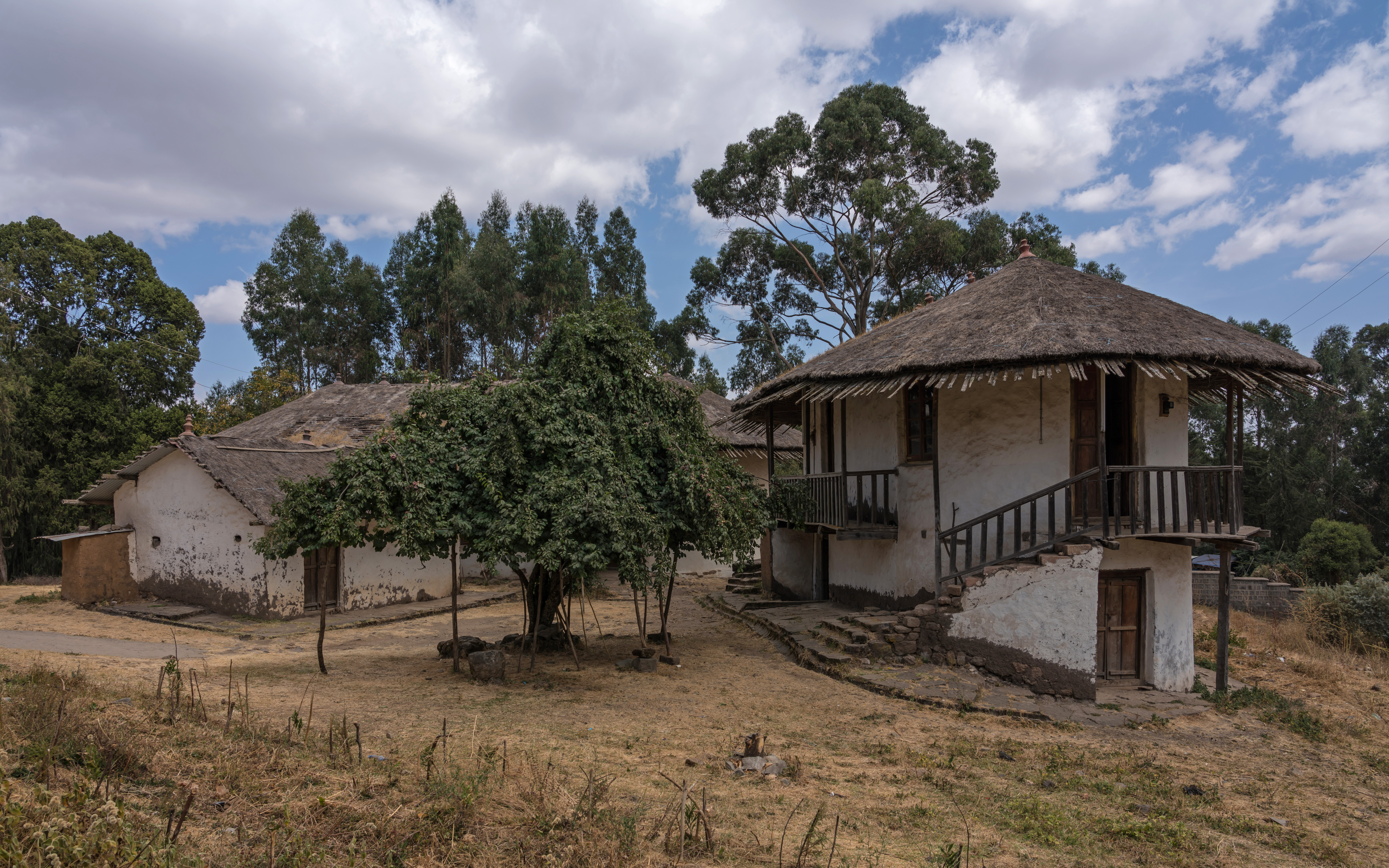
Emperor's palace

Mount Entoto (Amharic: እንጦጦ) is the highest peak on the Entoto Mountains, which overlooks the city of Addis Ababa, the capital of Ethiopia. It reaches 3,200 meters above sea level.

== Overview ==
It is a historical place where Emperor Menelik II resided and built his palace, when he came from Ankober and founded Addis Ababa. It is considered a sacred mountain and has many monasteries. Mount Entoto is also the location of a number of celebrated churches, including Saint Raguel and Saint Mary.

The mountain is densely covered by eucalyptus trees that were imported from Australia during the reign of Menelik II, and mostly planted during Emperor Haile Selassie's reign. Thus, it is sometimes referred to as the "lung of Addis Ababa". The forest on the mountain is an important source of firewood for the city. It was also a source of building material in earlier times.

The Ethiopian Heritage Trust, a non-profit, non-governmental organization, is working actively to change part of the mountain to its old state, a natural park. Entoto Natural Park is the northeastern rim of Addis Ababa, on the southeastern slopes of Mt. Entoto, covering an area of 1,300 hectares. It is situated at an altitude of between 2,600 and 3,100 meters. Its annual average rainfall and temperature are 1200 mm and 14°C, respectively. The northern rim of the park serves as a watershed between the Abay (Blue Nile) and Awash rivers.

The Ethiopian Space Science Society has an observatory on the 3,200 m summit.
