= Eastern Sidama Zone =

Zone in Sidama Region

- Zone
- Country: Ethiopia
- Region: Sidama
- Capital: Daye Bensa

Government
  - Zoone Administrators Respectively: Dr. Mathe Mengesha & Gizachewu No'ora (Zenebe Banata, Markos Folka and Daniel Kasa Respectivel)
- Time zone: UTC+3 (EAT)

Eastern Sidama is an administrative zone in Sidama Region. The zone is established up on resolution passed by Sidama regional state council at its third round meeting of the first year in 2022. Up on the establishment of the zone, the president of Sidama Region Desta Ledamo said that the name given to the zone Eastern Sidama is not intended to infer the location or direction of the zone, it also to avoid conflicts that may arise between the tribes in the region. Eastern Sidama is bordered on the south and north by Oromia region, on the north, south and east by the Oromia region and west by the Central Sidama Zone. The administrative centre of Northern Sidama Zone is Daye Bensa.
