= Irgalem =

Town in Sidama Region, Ethiopia

Yirgalem Yirgalem or Yirga 'Alem
- Town
- Location within Ethiopia
- Coordinates: 6°45′N 38°25′E
- Country: Ethiopia
- Region: Sidama Region
- Zone: Sidama
- Elevation: 1,776 m (5,827 ft)

Population (2005)
  - Total: 43,815
- Time zone: UTC+3 (EAT)
- Climate: Aw

Yirgalem (Amharic: ይርጋለም, Yïrgaläm) locally known as Diko Dalle is a town in southern Ethiopia. Surrounded by Lakes Woyima and Gidawo, it is located 260 kilometers south of Addis Ababa and 40 kilometers south of Hawassa in the Sidama Region. The town has a latitude and longitude of 6°45′N 38°25′E and an elevation of 1776 meters. It is the largest settlement in Dale woreda.

Postal service is provided by a main branch; electricity and telephone service are also available.

== History ==
Yirgalem was occupied by the Italians 1 December 1936 during their campaign against the remaining Ethiopian Army of Sidamo under Ras Desta Damtew. The town was capital of Sidamo Province until after the 1975 takeover by the Derge regime, when it was moved to Awassa.

Around 1957 there was no telephone landline connecting Irgalem; telecommunications were provided by a radio station. The next year, the town was one of 27 places in Ethiopia ranked as First Class Township. Installation of the landline between Irgalem and Addis Ababa was completed in late 1960. By that time a branch of the Ethiopian Electric Light and Power Authority had started operation at Irgalem.

The Mekane Yesus Church held its Eighth General Assembly at Irgalem in 1973. The Assembly passed a resolution requesting land reform in Ethiopia - a reform which was in fact put into action a couple of years later, as a result of the Ethiopian Revolution.

A large integrated agro-industrial park is being built in the town and construction began on March 14. The park is expected to create 134,000 jobs for the region.

== Demographics ==
Based on figures from the Central Statistical Agency of Ethiopia published in 2005, Yirgalem has an estimated total population of 43,815 of whom 21,840 are men and 21,975 women. The 1994 national census reported this town had a total population of 24,183 of whom 12,092 were men and 12,091 were women.

== Climate ==
Climate data for Irgalem, elevation 1,835 m (6,020 ft), (1971–2000)
Month	Jan	Feb	Mar	Apr	May	Jun	Jul	Aug	Sep	Oct	Nov	Dec	Year
Mean daily maximum °C (°F)	28.5 (83.3)	29.0 (84.2)	29.0 (84.2)	27.2 (81.0)	26.8 (80.2)	25.3 (77.5)	23.7 (74.7)	24.1 (75.4)	24.6 (76.3)	25.8 (78.4)	26.4 (79.5)	27.5 (81.5)	26.5 (79.7)
Mean daily minimum °C (°F)	8.9 (48.0)	9.5 (49.1)	10.6 (51.1)	11.1 (52.0)	11.1 (52.0)	11.1 (52.0)	12.2 (54.0)	12.9 (55.2)	12.2 (54.0)	11.7 (53.1)	10.2 (50.4)	10.2 (50.4)	11.0 (51.8)
Average precipitation mm (inches)	43.0 (1.69)	57.0 (2.24)	104.0 (4.09)	153.0 (6.02)	143.0 (5.63)	94.0 (3.70)	114.0 (4.49)	136.0 (5.35)	153.0 (6.02)	126.0 (4.96)	57.0 (2.24)	36.0 (1.42)	1,216 (47.85)
Average relative humidity (%)	59	58	61	69	71	75	73	74	77	70	67	57	68
Source: FAO
