= Sidama language =

Afro-Asiatic language spoken by Sidama people in Ethiopia

Sidama
- Sidaamu Afoo
- Native to: Ethiopia
- Region: Sidama region
- Ethnicity: Sidama
- Native speakers: 4.9 million (2022)
- Language family: Afro-Asiatic: Cushitic; Highland East; Sidama
- Writing system: Latin

Language codes
- ISO 639-2: sid
- ISO 639-3: sid
- Glottolog: sida1246

Sidama or Sidaamu Afoo is an Afroasiatic language belonging to the Highland East Cushitic branch of the Cushitic family. It is spoken in parts of southern Ethiopia by the Sidama people, particularly in the densely populated Sidama National Regional State (SNRS). Sidaamu Afoo is the ethnic autonym for the language, while Sidaminya is its name in Amharic. It is not known to have any specific dialects. The word order is typically SOV. Sidama has over 100,000 L2 speakers. The literacy rate for L1 speakers is 1%-5%, while for L2 speakers it is 20%. In terms of its writing, Sidama used an Ethiopic script up until 1993, from which point forward it has used a Latin script.

== Terminology and classification ==
The term Sidamo has also been used in the past to refer to most Highland East Cushitic languages, earlier even to some Omotic languages. The results from a research study conducted in 1968-1969 concerning mutual intelligibility between different Sidamo languages suggest that Sidama is more closely related to the Gedeo language, which it shares a border with to the south, than other Sidamo languages. According to Ethnologue, the two languages share a lexical similarity of 60%. Another study shows over 64% lexical similarity with Alaba-K'abeena, 62% with Kambaata, and 53% with Hadiyya, all of which are other Highland East Cushitic languages spoken in southwestern Ethiopia. Sidama vocabulary has also been influenced by Oromo vocabulary.

== Phonology ==
=== Consonants ===
		Labial	Dental/ Alveolar	Palatal	Velar	Glottal
Plosive/ Affricate	plain	b	t d	tʃ dʒ	k g	
Plosive/ Affricate	ejective	pʼ	tʼ	tʃʼ	kʼ	ʔ
Plosive/ Affricate	implosive		ɗ			
Fricative		f	s z	ʃ		h
Nasal	plain	m	n	ɲ		
Nasal	glottalized	ʼm	ʼn			
Tap/Flap	plain		ɾ			
Tap/Flap	glottalized		ʼɾ			
Approximant	plain	w	l	j		
Approximant	glottalized		ʼl	ʼj		

- Other consonant sounds /p/ and /v/ are only heard from loanwords.
- Gemination is also present for most consonants (e.g. /tː, kː, pʼː/).
- /ɾ/ can also be heard as a trill [rː] when geminated.

=== Vowels ===
	Front	Central	Back
Close	i iː		u uː
Mid	e eː		o oː
Open		a aː	

== Grammar ==
=== Noun phrases ===
In Sidama, not all noun phrases have nouns. This can occur when it is so obvious what kind of thing the referent of the noun phrase is, that it is unnecessary for the speaker to mention it. Sidama has two types of noun phrases without nouns. One type is made up only of an adjective or a numeral, where the adjective or the numeral agrees in case, number, and gender with the referent of a noun phrase. This is shown in the examples below:

busul-u da-ø-ino.
smart-NOM.M come-3SG.M-PERF.3
‘The smart one (masculine) came.’

sas-u da-ø-ino
three-NOM.M come-3SG.M-PERF.3
‘The three (masculine) came.’

The other type of noun phrase without a noun is formed with a noun-phrase clitic, or NPC. This NPC starts with t (FEM) or h (MASC). This is thought to originate from the Afro-Asiatic demonstrative containing t (FEM) or k (MASC). The Sidama NPC appears in various forms. Which form is used then depends on the gender of the referent of the noun phrase, and the syntactic role or case of the noun phrase. When a noun phrase without a noun is formed with an NPC, both the speaker and the listener know its referent. In this case, the NPC attaches to the end of a genitive noun phrase or relative clause to form a noun phrase without a noun. This is shown in the examples below:

isí=ti ba’-’-ino.
3SG.M.GEN=NPC.F.NOM disappear-3SG.F-PERF.3
‘His (FEM) disappeared.’

ani ku’uí beett-í=ta seekk-o-mm-o.
1SG.NOM that.M.GEN child-GEN.M.MOD=NPC.F.ACC repair-PERF.1-1SG-M
‘I (MASC) repaired that boy’s (FEM).’
