= Sidama people =

Ethnic group native to Ethiopia

Sidama
Sidaama (Sidamo)
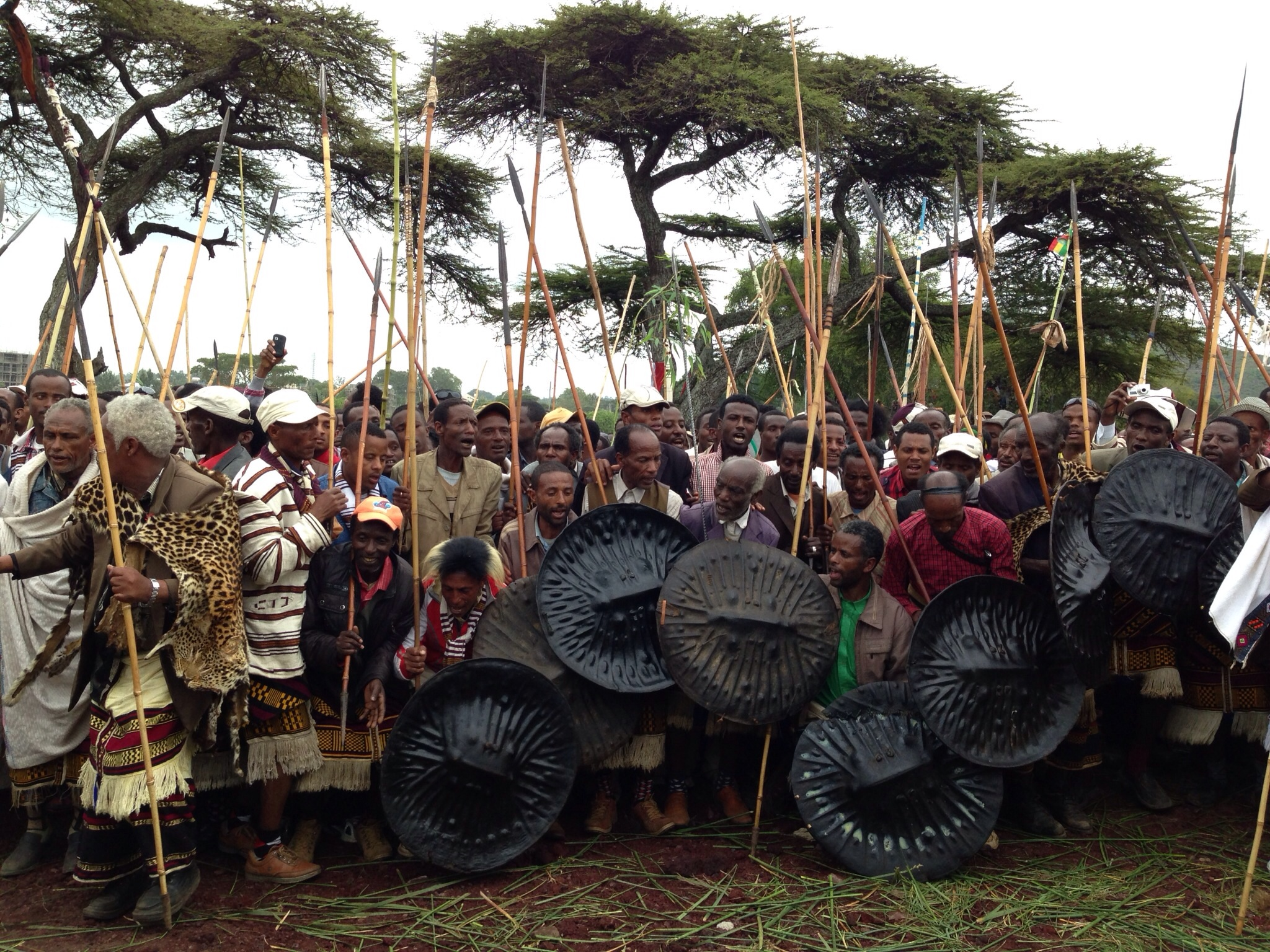
- Sidama people celebrating Fichee New Year in Gudumale, Hawassa, 2013

Total population
- 2,966,474 (2007 census)

Regions with significant populations
- Ethiopia

Languages
- Sidamu Afoo

Religion
- Majority: Christianity (P'ent'ay); Minority: Islam

Related ethnic groups
- Kambaata • Gedeo • Halaba • Kebena • Oromo • Cushitic peoples

The Sidama (Amharic: ሲዳማ) are an ethnic group traditionally inhabiting the Sidama Region, formerly part of the Southern Nations, Nationalities, and Peoples' Region of Ethiopia. On 23 November 2019, the Sidama Zone became the 10th regional state in Ethiopia after a zone-wide referendum. They speak the Sidama language, which is a language of the Cushitic branch of the Afroasiatic language family. Despite their large numbers, the Sidama lacked a separate ethnic regional state until continuous protests resulted in the proposal being voted on in a November 2019 referendum.

== History ==
In historical writings on the Sidama there is certain confusion on who the Sidama were and which areas should be defined as theirs. This group was called the Sidamo cluster in early writings, and the name "Sidamo" was used as a collective for all Cushitic and Omotic people of southwest Ethiopia. Historian Lapiso Gedelebo states that the term Sidama was traditionally a demeaning designation used to refer to non Oromo people by the Oromo.

The Sidama people were thought to have originally lived in the historical province of Bale around the Dawa River before being driven out by the Oromos in the early 16th century. The Sidama then led an exodus westwards towards their modern homeland around Lake Hawassa. According to oral traditions, the Sidama settlers had found the area to be inhabited by another tribe named the Hofa, but later drove them out.

Throughout Sidama history two groups of clans competed for political power. The first group is the Yemericho which includes eight clans who were the first settlers of the area. They have occupied large contiguous segments of land and have therefore been considered to have the highest degree of purity (agna). The second group is the Aletta which includes twelve clans who together make up the numerical majority. Clans in Sidama had their own territories and leaders who constantly waged war on each other.

The Sidama were then forcefully incorporated into the Ethiopian Empire during the Agar Maqnat. Most of the Sidama clans submitted to Menelik II without a fight. The clans of Hollo-Garbicho and Sawola in the north and some of the Aletta clans in the south had made attempts to defend their territory, but the lack of trust between them and other clans prevented them from coordinating their resistance and forming a united front. Other clans like the Yanase immediately decided to submit to the Emperor and agreed to pay tribute.

== Demographics ==
The Sidama people number 3.81 million (4.01% of the national population), of whom 149,480 are urban inhabitants, the fifth most populous ethnic group in Ethiopia. Their language is called Sidaamu-Afoo, which according to the 1994 national census was the mother language of 99.5% of them. According to one authority, the majority of the Sidama practice their traditional beliefs, and only in the 1960s, when European missionaries came to their region, did any leave that faith. However, according to the 1994 national census, only 14.9% practice traditional beliefs, while the majority (66.8%) are Protestant, 7.7% Muslim, 4.6% Catholic, and 2.3% practice Ethiopian Orthodox Christianity.

== Government and politics ==
Sidama flag

=== Sidama Region ===
Today, the Sidama area has many schools, and adequate health services, though primary, secondary, preparatory and many colleges and university education has increased . There is a Sidama administrative zone within Ethiopia's Southern Nations, Nationalities, and Peoples' Region. The Sidama Zone became its own regional state after a November 2019 referendum.

== Economy ==
Nearly 90% of the Sidama live a life centred on agriculture. An important staple food is the wesse plant, or false banana. Other crops are also grown and cattle are often raised, with a strong cultural tradition surrounding their ownership. Perhaps the most important source of income is coffee, and "chat" or khat trees are also a major source of income. The Sidama area is a major contributor to coffee production, producing a high percentage of export coffee for the central government, second only to the Oromia region. The Sidama farmers have been affected by hunger caused by declining world market prices for coffee, despite supplying the popular coffee chain Starbucks with the majority of their coffee products from the region.

== Religion and beliefs ==
Spirit possession occurs among the Sidama. The anthropologists Irene and John Hamer postulated that spirit possession is a form of compensation for being deprived within Sidama society. The majority of the possessed are women whose spirits demand luxury goods to alleviate their condition, but men can be possessed as well. Possessed individuals of both genders can become healers due to their condition. Hamer and Hamer (1966) suggest that this is a form of compensation among deprived men in the deeply competitive society of the Sidama, for if a man cannot gain prestige as an orator, warrior, or farmer, he may still gain prestige as a spiritual healer. Women are sometimes accused of faking possession, but men never are.

== See also ==
- Sidama Region
