= Danta people =

Ethnic group in southern Ethiopia

The Danta people, historically and commonly known as Dubamo, are an ethnic group in Ethiopia. The homeland of the Danta is in the Southern Nations, Nationalities and Peoples Region (SNNPR), specifically the Hadiya Zone, and less so in the Kembata Tembaro Zone (KT).

== Origin, language and religion ==
The Danta, historically and commonly known as Dubamo are a small ethnic group in Ethiopia. Their symbolic center of settlement is the highland area of Danta, after which they are sometimes named. The Danta originally spoke the Dantagna dialect of Kambaata. However, the Danta have made a significant linguistic transition since the Hadiya migrated into their homeland at the beginning of the 19th century. A sizable number of Danta living in their original home have so far resisted assimilation by the Hadiya and still speak their original Dantagna dialect.

Historically, Danta is thought to be a "state formed in Kambata about 1550-1570", and the "Dubamo people were known to have slave trade with Jimma even after the anti-slavery proclamation of 1923". The Danta "were organized in a small kingship whose rulers claim descent from 'King Solomon' of Gondar, i.e. from Amharic nobility". The Danta still maintain "a tradition that they came from Gondar about 15 generations ago" and "conserved an outstanding consciousness as an upper stratum tracing their origin to the North Ethiopian Christian area, a stratum which had at one time superimposed itself upon a Kushitic" substratum of the indigenous people.

To date, it is a common practice for an average Danta to name his or her paternal genealogy going back to more than 20 generations. Braukämper, in one of his other articles on the Danta, suggests that their allusion of their origin to King Solomon and the Amharic nobility may be an astute strategy to legitimization of status and power rather than evidence of an actual hereditary relationship with the north. However, a layman’s analysis of their genealogy (e.g. tribe names and distant ancestral names of individuals) occasionally yields, albeit weakly, names that connote northern connection.

Hawzula is a supra-natural deity worshiped by all Danta in the past and still by some to date. The Hawzula spirit 'speaks' and 'works' through the Hawzulmancho, a hereditary Dubamo man on whom the Hawzula spirit descends and dwells on. Hawzula was the arbitrator, councilor and judge on all matters not only for Danta but also for the neighboring peoples such as the Hadiya, Donga, Kambaata and Timbaro. Many Danta confessed Ethiopian Orthodox Christianity after Menelik II’s conquest in the 1880s but evangelical Christianity has become the dominant religion since the 1970s.

== The Danta-Dubamo land ==
The Danta nationality are mainly concentrated in the cool highlands of the Soro, Duna and Misha woredas of the Hadiya Zone, although a large number of Danta also live in the adjoining Doyo Gena woreda of the KT. Reportedly, relatively small clusters of people of some Danta tribes live in the Silt'e and Wolaita Zones. They are known for their intensive cultivation of ensete and barley and for breeding of horses. Dantich farasho, literally meaning "the flying horse of Danta", is a phrase that is commonly used for eulogy.

== Political participation ==
Since the federal rearrangement of the Ethiopian state in the 1990s, "the Dubamo increasingly became aware of their non-Hadiya origin and started demanding an administrative district of their own". From that time, the Danta have repeatedly petitioned the government for recognition and representation as an ethnic group. In the 1990s, the Dubamo refused to acknowledge the Hadiya-dominated local administrators as their legitimate rulers and stopped paying taxes as a token of resistance. Ever since the Danta have been making peaceful political struggle for representation at all administrative levels including the councils at the district, zonal and regional levels and the Houses of Peoples Representatives and Federation at the national level. No definitive answer has so far been given and the case is still active and pending. Local media have reported on the demands of the Dubamo at various times and the Deutsche Welle radio Amharic service has made a lengthy report on the case on 12 May 2009.

In the current political configuration, most Danta are either neutral or affiliated with the Ethiopian People's Revolutionary Democratic Front. This aside, because of the increasing consciousness of their distinct historical and cultural identity, a few Danta elites living in the area had opted for establishing a legally registered ethnic based political party called the "Danta, Dubamo Kinchichila People Democratic Organization", and named two candidates for the 2005 general elections.
