= Omo Sheleko =

District in the Southern Nations, Nationalities, and Peoples' Region, Ethiopia

Coordinates: 7°15′N 37°30′E

Omo Sheleko was one of 77 woredas in the Southern Nations, Nationalities, and Peoples' Region of Ethiopia. Part of the Kembata Alaba and Tembaro Zone, Omo Sheleko was bordered on the south by the Semien Omo Zone, on the west by the Omo River which separates it from another part of the Semien Omo Zone, on the north by the Hadiya Zone, and on the east by Kacha Bira. Towns in Omo Sheleko included Mudula and Tunto. Omo Sheleko was divided for Hadero Tunto and Tembaro woredas.

Crop production (i.e., cereals, cash and root crops) and livestock rearing are the main livelihoods in this woreda. However they have been disrupted for some time due to a combination of lack of rain, decline in soil fertility and population pressure, making it extremely difficult for the inhabitants of the woreda to feed themselves. In 2003, for example, Omo Sheleko experienced drought in 26 of its 31 kebeles, while paradoxically five kebeles were hit by a severe hailstorm on 24 May of that year. Omo Sheleko has 40 kilometers of all-weather roads and 41 kilometers of dry-weather roads, for an average road density of 184 kilometers per 1000 square kilometers.

== Demographics ==
Based on figures published by the Central Statistical Agency in 2005, this woreda has an estimated total population of 179,294, of whom 90,632 were males and 88,662 were females; 8,181 or 4.56% of its population are urban dwellers, which is less than the Zone average of 8.8%. With an estimated area of 467.35 square kilometers, Omo Sheleko has an estimated population density of 383.6 people per square kilometer, which is less than the Zone average of 429.4.

The 1994 national census reported a total population for this woreda of 125,986 in 23,627 households, of whom 62,327 were men and 63,659 were women; 4,515 or 3.58% of its population were urban dwellers. The five largest ethnic groups reported in Omo Sheleko were the Tembaro (62.85%), the Hadiya (13.05%), the Kambaata (3.08%), the Welayta (1.81%) and the Amhara (1.03%); all other ethnic groups made up 18.18% of the population. Tembarsa is spoken as a first language by 61.65%, 15.22% Hadiya, 6.28% Kambaata, 1.44% speak Welayta, and 0.53% speak Amharic; the remaining 0.53% spoke all other primary languages reported. 57.64% of the population said they were Protestants, 24.42% practiced Ethiopian Orthodox Christianity, 7.77% observed traditional beliefs, 3.48% were Catholic, and 2.73% Muslim.
