= Kedida Gamela =

District in the Central Ethiopia Regional State

Coordinates: 7°15′N 37°55′E

Kedida Gamela is a woreda in the Central Ethiopia Regional State of Ethiopia. Part of the Kembata Zone. Kedida Gamela is bordered on the east and south by an Misraq Badawacho woreda of the Hadiya Zone, on the west by Kacha Bira, on the northwest by Angacha, on the north by Damboya, and on the northeast by the Bilate River which separates it from Halaba Zone. The northern part of Kedida Gamela was separated to create Damboya woreda. The administrative center of the district is Durame.

== Overview ==
The altitude of this woreda ranges from 1700 to 3028 meters above sea level. Its area is divided into 7% highland (Dega) and 93% Weyna Dega (sub-tropical climate). Kedida Gamela has 45 kilometers of all-weather roads and 17 kilometers of dry-weather roads, for an average road density of 199 kilometers per 1000 square kilometers.

Into the early 1990s inhabitants of this woreda would temporarily migrate to places like Harar, Wonji, Welkite, Negele Arsi, Shashamene, and Wondo Genet to look for work. Migrants went to Metahara and the Wonji Sugar Plantation to work as day laborers cutting sugarcane. They went to the Siraro State Farm in the Arsi Province and Kedi Shamena State Farm as day laborers. In September and April they would migrate to Welkite to plant and harvest maize for farmers. They migrated to Alaba Kulito in April, March, December, January and July to harvest or plant peppers for farmers. With the evolution of Regions during the Transitional Government of Ethiopia, migrating for work was discouraged.

== Demographics ==
Based on the 2007 Census conducted by the CSA, this woreda has a total population of 89,391, of whom 44,589 are men and 44,802 women; 4,660 or 5.21% of its population are urban dwellers. The majority of the inhabitants were Protestants, with 76.48% of the population reporting that belief, 11.18% were Catholic, 9.91% were Muslim, and 1.7% practiced Ethiopian Orthodox Christianity.

The 1994 national census reported a total population for this woreda of 140,880 of whom 70,783 were men and 93,194 were women; 16,723 or 11.87% of its population were urban dwellers. The three largest ethnic groups reported in Kedida Gamela were the Kambaata (97.32%), the Hadiya (0.74%) and the Amhara (0.71%); all other ethnic groups made up 1.23% of the population. Kambaata is spoken as a first language by 96.98%, 1.43% speak Amharic, and 0.54% speak Hadiya; the remaining 1.05% spoke all other primary languages reported. The majority of the inhabitants were Protestants, with 57.24% of the population reporting that belief, while 24.9% were Muslim, 8.8% practiced Ethiopian Orthodox Christianity, and 8.03% were Catholic.
