= Damboya =

Damboya is one of the woredas in the Southern Nations, Nationalities, and Peoples' Region of Ethiopia. Part of the Kembata Tembaro Zone, Damboya is bordered on the south by Kedida Gamela, on the west by Angacha, on the north by the Hadiya Zone, and on the east by the Bilate River which separates it from Alaba. Towns in Damboya include Damboya. The town of Durame is surrounded by Damboya woreda. Damboya was separated from Kedida Gamela woreda.

== Demographics ==
Based on the 2007 Census conducted by the CSA, this woreda has a total population of 82,622, of whom 41,543 are men and 41,079 women; 8,122 or 9.83% of its population are urban dwellers. The majority of the inhabitants were Protestants, with 82.07% of the population reporting that belief, 10.35% were Muslim, 5.17% practiced Ethiopian Orthodox Christianity, and 2.23% were Catholic.
