= Badawacho =

District in the Southern Nations, Nationalities and Peoples' Region, Ethiopia

Coordinates: 7°10′N 37°55′E

Badawacho was one of the 77 woredas in the Southern Nations, Nationalities, and Peoples' Region of Ethiopia. A triangle-shaped exclave of the Hadiya Zone, Badawacho was bordered on the south by the Wolayita Zone, on the west and north by the Kembata Tembaro Zone, and on the east by the Oromia Region and Sidama Zone. Badawacho has got three small lakes: Budamada - deepest of all three, Tiello and Matchafara - home for hippopotamus and variety of birds. The Bilate River which separates the three lakes is also home for crocodiles and hippopotamus. The major town in Badawacho was Shone. Badawacho was separated for Mirab Badawacho and Misraq Badawacho woredas.

Badawacho has 58 kilometers of all-weather roads and 59 kilometers of dry-weather roads, for an average road density of 217 kilometers per 1000 square kilometers.

== History ==
On 5 April 2000, prior to the 2000 general election, four Southern Ethiopia Peoples' Democratic Coalition (SEPDC) members were injured during clashes between the army and the SEPDC in Badawacho; that same month the army killed another four SEPDC members in the woreda while they were searching for a particular party activist. In the 2005 Ethiopian elections, one of the two electoral districts in this woreda elected Beyene Petros (leader of the United Ethiopian Democratic Forces) as their representative in the House of Peoples' Representatives.

West Badawacho suffered from a green famine in 2008, after the small rains in March–May failed to arrive and the rainy season arrived too late for local farmers. Combined with poor harvests in 2007, which has led to loss of livestock, these factors led to a situation where officials report 4.6 million people in drought-affected parts, not only in Badawacho but across Ethiopia, required £162.5 million of assistance, although unofficial estimates from donor agencies put the figure in the range of 8-10 million people. This crisis is called a "green famine" because not only is the countryside lush and apparently fertile despite widespread hunger, but the shortage and high price of food stuffs that could be imported have made the situation worse.

== Demographics ==
Based on figures published by the Central Statistical Agency in 2005, this woreda has an estimated total population of 251,197, of whom 126,706 were males and 124,491 were females; 14,911 or 5.94% of its population are urban dwellers, which is less than the Zone average of 8.1%. With an estimated area of 516.57 square kilometers, Badawacho has an estimated population density of 486.3 people per square kilometer, which is greater than the Zone average of 378.7.

The 1994 national census reported a total population for this woreda of 175,966 of whom 87,234 were males and 88,732 were females; 8,230 or 4.68% of its population were urban dwellers. The five largest ethnic groups reported in Badawacho were the Hadiya (82.15%), the Kambaata (5.45%), the Alaba (4.71%), the Welayta (3.77%), and the Oromo (2.05%); all other ethnic groups made up 1.87% of the population. Hadiya was spoken as a first language by 78.79%, 9.33% Kambaata, 4.92% spoke Alaba, 4.45% Welayta, and 1.79% spoke Amharic; the remaining 0.72% spoke all other primary languages reported. 48.25% of the population said they were Protestants, 21.48% embraced Ethiopian Orthodox Christianity, 18.99% were Muslim, 7.72% were Catholic, and 1.22% practiced traditional religions.
