= Konteb =

Former district in Southern Nations, Nationalities, and Peoples' Region, Ethiopia

Coordinates: 7°45′N 37°45′E

Konteb was one of the 77 woredas in the Southern Nations, Nationalities, and Peoples' Region of Ethiopia. Part of the Hadiya Zone, Konteb was bordered on the south by Soro, on the west by the Omo River which separates it from the Yem special woreda, on the north by the Gurage Zone, and on the east by Limo. Towns in Konteb included Geja, Hamecho, Kose, Morsito and Sera. Konteb was divided for Gibe and Misha woredas.

== Demographics ==
Based on figures published by the Central Statistical Agency in 2005, this woreda has an estimated total population of 408,422, of whom 204,566 were males and 203,856 were females; 15,844 or 3.88% of its population are urban dwellers, which is less than the Zone average of 8.1%. With an estimated area of 1,225.00 square kilometers, Konteb has an estimated population density of 333.4 people per square kilometer, which is less than the Zone average of 378.7.

The 1994 national census reported a total population for this woreda of 287,430 of whom 143,587 were males and 143,843 were females; 8,743 or 3.04% of its population were urban dwellers. The five largest ethnic groups reported in Konteb were the Hadiya (80.98%), the Soddo Gurage (6.15%), the Silte (5.27%), the Sebat Bet Gurage (1.96%), and the Amhara (0.79%); all other ethnic groups made up 4.85% of the population. Hadiya was spoken as a first language by 89.22%, 4.33% Silte, 3.51% spoke Soddo Gurage, 1.48% Sebat Bet Gurage, and 0.95% spoke Amharic; the remaining 0.51% spoke all other primary languages reported. 46.81% of the population said they were Protestants, 22.23% embraced Ethiopian Orthodox Christianity, 22.14% were Muslim, 5.38% Catholic, and 0.42% practiced traditional religions. Concerning education, 35.42% of the population were considered literate, which is more than the Zone average of 33.01%. Concerning sanitary conditions, 43.84% of the urban houses and 19.3% of all houses had access to safe drinking water at the time of the census; 34.52% of the urban and 4.97% of all houses had toilet facilities.
