= Misraq Badawacho =

Misraq Badawacho is one of the woredas in the Southern Nations, Nationalities, and Peoples' Region of Ethiopia. It is part of a triangle-shaped exclave of the Hadiya Zone. Misraq Badawacho is bordered on the south by the Wolayita Zone, on the west by Mirab Badawacho, on the north by the Kembata Tembaro Zone, on the northeast by the Halaba Zone, and on the east by the Bilate River which separates it from the Oromia Region. The major town in Misraq Badawacho is Shone. Misraq Badawacho was part of former Badawacho woreda.

== Demographics ==
Based on the 2007 Census conducted by the CSA, this woreda has a total population of 142,823, of whom 71,180 are men and 71,643 women; 15,616 or 10.93% of its population are urban dwellers. The majority of the inhabitants were Protestants, with 67.47% of the population reporting that belief, 20.07% were Muslim, 8.02% were Catholic, and 3.58% practiced Ethiopian Orthodox Christianity.
