= Dimtu (disambiguation) =

Dimtu may refer to:

- Dimtu, town in Wolaita Zone, Ethiopia
- Jaba Dimtu, settlement in Kenya
- Tullu Dimtu, fourth highest peak in Ethiopia
