= Kacha Bira =

District in the Southern Nations, Nationalities, and Peoples' Region of Ethiopia

Coordinates: 7°15′N 37°45′E

Kacha Bira is a woreda in the Southern Nations, Nationalities, and Peoples' Region of Ethiopia. Part of the Kembata Tembaro Zone, Kacha Bira is bordered on the south by an exclave of the Hadiya Zone, on the southwest by the Wolayita Zone, on the west by Hadero Tunto, on the northwest by the Hadiya Zone, on the north by Doyogena and Angacha, and on the east by Kedida Gamela. Towns in Kacha Bira include Shinshicho and Hadero.

Kacha Bira has 56 kilometers of all-weather roads and 37 kilometers of dry-weather roads, for an average road density of 310 kilometers per 1000 square kilometers.

In March 2000, police from Durame reportedly killed Ermias Abuye, a resident of Kacha Bira, while he was plowing his fields for supporting the Southern Ethiopia Peoples' Democratic Coalition. Police reportedly refused to investigate the case initially despite a request from the farmer's family, and the responsible officer was working in the Durame police station at year's end.

== Demographics ==
Based on the 2007 Census conducted by the CSA, this woreda has a total population of 113,687, of whom 55,827 are men and 57,860 women; 15,848 or 13.94% of its population are urban dwellers. The majority of the inhabitants were Protestants, with 85.57% of the population reporting that belief, 8.13% were Catholic and 5.98% practiced Ethiopian Orthodox Christianity.

1994 Population and Housing Census of Ethiopia: Results for Southern Nations, Nationalities, and Peoples' Region, Vol. 1, part 1, Tables 2.1, 2.12, 2.15, 2.19 (accessed 30 December 2008)</ref>
