= Damot Pulasa =

District in South Ethiopia Regional State

Damot Pulasa: Daamoota Pullaasa Allaanaa (Wolaytta); ዳሞት ፑላሳ (Amharic)
- Woreda
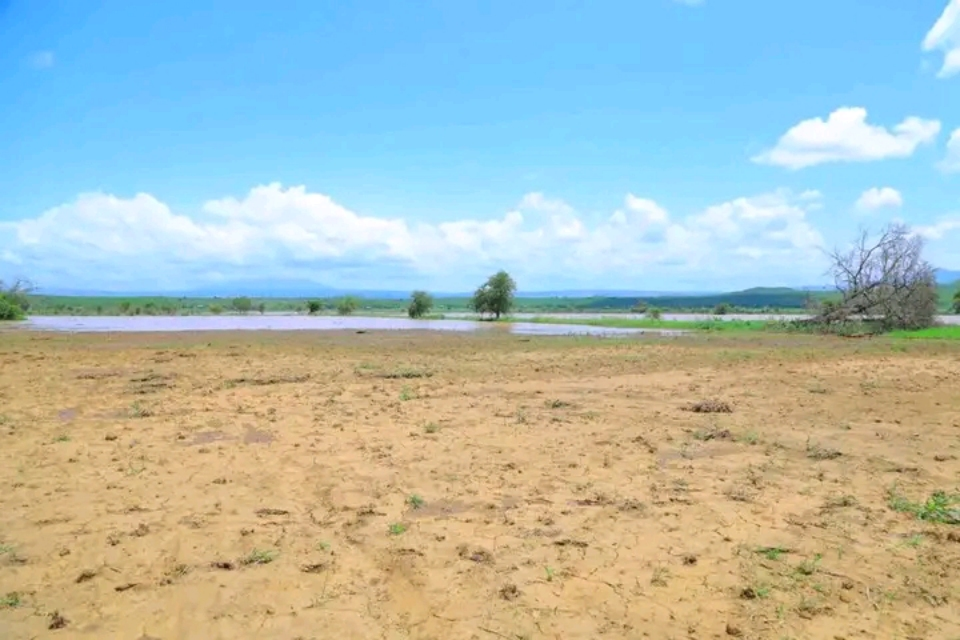
- Damota Pulasa farmland area
- Interactive map of Damot Pulasa
- Country: Ethiopia
- Region: South Ethiopia Regional State
- Zone: Wolaita
- Seat: Shanto

Government
  - Chief Administrator: Sisay Samuel (Prosperity Party)

Population (2019)
  - Total: 135,760
  - Male: 66,463
  - Female: 69,297
- Time zone: UTC+3 (EAT)

Damot Pulasa is a district in South Ethiopia, Part of the Wolayita Zone. Damot Pulasa is bordered on the east and south by Damot Gale, on the west by the Boloso Sore, and on the north by the Hadiya Zone. Damot Pulasa was separated from Damo Gale district. The administrative center of the district is Shanto.

== Demographics ==
Based on the 2019 population projection conducted by the CSA, this woreda has a total population of 135,760, of whom 66,463 are men and 69,297 women; 5,346 or 5.08% of its population are urban dwellers. The majority of the inhabitants were Protestants, with 73.72% of the population reporting that belief, 17.1% were Roman Catholic, and 8.17% practiced Ethiopian Orthodox Christianity.
