= Mirab Badawacho =

Mirab Badawacho is one of the woredas in the Southern Nations, Nationalities, and Peoples' Region of Ethiopia. It is part of a triangle-shaped exclave of the Hadiya Zone. Mirab Badawacho is bordered on the south by the Wolayita Zone, on the north by the Kembata Tembaro Zone, and on the east by Misraq Badawacho. Mirab Badawacho was part of former Badawacho woreda.

== Demographics ==
Based on the 2007 Census conducted by the CSA, this woreda has a total population of 83,439, of whom 40,876 are men and 42,563 women; 2,114 or 2.53% of its population are urban dwellers. The majority of the inhabitants were Protestants, with 84.65% of the population reporting that belief, 7.17% were Catholic, and 6.09% practiced Ethiopian Orthodox Christianity.
