= Edo (Wolaita) =

Town in Wolaita, Ethiopia

Edo: Eddo Ambbaa (Wolaytta); ኤዶ (Amharic)
- Town
- Edo within Ethiopia
- Coordinates: 7°01′28″N 38°0′30″E
- Country: Ethiopia
- Region: SNNPR
- Zone: Wolaita
- Woreda: Diguna Fango
- Time zone: UTC+3 (EAT)

Edo (Geʽez: ኤዶ) is a town in Wolayita Zone of the Southern Nations, Nationalities, and Peoples' Region, Ethiopia. Edo town is located 310 km away from Addis Ababa and also 47 km from Wolaita Sodo town through Kercheche. The town is located in the north west edge of Diguna Fango woreda. Agricultural products are highly available in Edo town market which are produced from surrounding communities. The amenities in the town are 24 hours electric light, pure water service, kindergarten, primary and high schools, health center, everyday public market and others. Edo town lies between about 7°01'28" North 38°0'30" East. And the town located at an elevation of 1,730 meters above sea level.
