= Diguna Fango =

Diguna Fango: Duguna Panggo Allaanaa (Wolaytta); ድጉና ፋንጎ ወረዳ (Amharic)
- Woreda
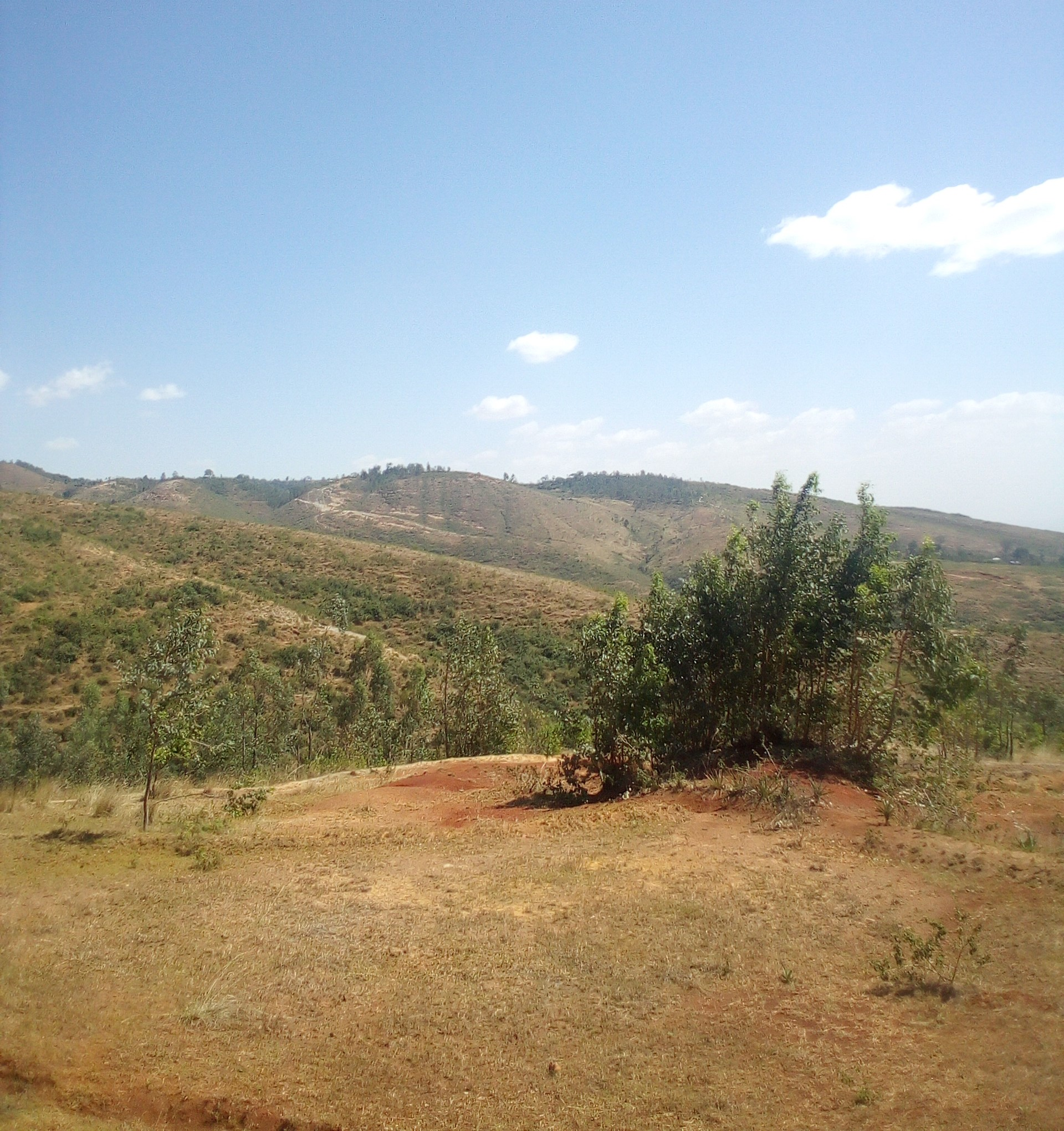
- Interactive map of Diguna Fango
- Country: Ethiopia
- Region: South Ethiopia
- Zone: Wolaita
- Established: 1998 E.C.
- Seat: Bitena

Government
  - Chief administrator: Temesgen Dansa (Prosperity Party)

Population (2019)
  - Total: 122,924
  - Male: 60,326
  - Female: 62,924

Diguna Fango is one of the woredas in the South Ethiopia Regional State of Ethiopia. It is a Part of the Wolayita Zone located in the Great Rift Valley, Diguna Fango is bordered on the southwest by Damot Weyde, on the west by Damot Gale, on the north by the Hadiya Zone, on the northeast by the Oromia Region, and on the east by Bilate river, which separates it from Sidama Region. The administrative center of the woreda is Bitena Town; the other major towns in the woreda include Dimtu, Kercheche, and Edo. Diguna Fango was separated from Damot Weyde woreda in 1998 E. C.

== Demographics ==
Based on the 2017 population projection conducted by the CSA, this woreda has a total population of 122,924, of whom 60,326 are men and 62,924 women; 3,404 or 3.53% of its population are urban dwellers. The majority of the inhabitants were Protestants, with 84.43% of the population reporting that belief, 8.97% practiced Ethiopian Orthodox Christianity, and 5.57% were Roman Catholic.
