= Angacha =

District in the Southern Nations, Nationalities, and Peoples' Region of Ethiopia

Coordinates: 7°20′N 37°50′E

Angacha is one of the woredas in the Southern Nations, Nationalities, and Peoples' Region of Ethiopia. Part of the Kembata Tembaro Zone, Angacha is bordered on the south by Kacha Bira, on the west by Doyogena, on the north by the Hadiya Zone, on the east by Damboya, and on the southeast by Kedida Gamela. Towns in Angacha include Angacha, the administration center and Funemura, a fast growing town in the northern part of Angacha woreda. Western part of Angacha woreda was separated to create Doyogena woreda including Amecho Wato town.

Angacha has 77 kilometers of all-weather roads and 45 kilometers of dry-weather roads, for an average road density of 381 kilometers per 1000 square kilometers.

== Demographics ==
Based on the 2007 Census conducted by the CSA, this woreda has a total population of 88,083, of whom 44,057 are men and 44,026 women; 6,819 or 7.74% of its population are urban dwellers. The majority of the inhabitants are Protestants, with 88.32% of the population reporting that belief, 5.46% practiced Ethiopian Orthodox Christianity, and 3.93% were Catholic.

The 1994 national census reported a total population for this woreda of 154,837 of whom 77,735 were men and 77,102 were women; 7,205 or 4.65% of its population were urban dwellers. The three largest ethnic groups reported in Angacha were the Kambaata (94.71%), the Hadiya (4.1%) and the Amhara (0.68%); all other ethnic groups made up 0.51% of the population. Kambaata is spoken as a first language by 94.43%, 4.15% speak Hadiya, and 1.2% speak Amharic; the remaining 0.22% spoke all other primary languages reported. 67.32% of the population said they were Protestants, 20.72% practiced Ethiopian Orthodox Christianity, 9.87% were Catholic, and 1.75% were Muslim.
