= Danta =

Danta may refer to:

- Danta, Banaskantha, a town in Banaskantha district, Gujarat, India
- Danta, Sikar, a village in Sikar district, Rajasthan, India
- Danta people, an ethnic group in Ethiopia
- Dàntǎ, Chinese for egg tart
