= Hadero Tunto =

Hadero Tunto is one of the woredas in the Southern Nations, Nationalities, and Peoples' Region of Ethiopia. Part of the Kembata Tembaro Zone, Hadero Tunto is bordered on the south by the Wolayita Zone, on the west by Tembaro, on the north by the Hadiya Zone, and on the east by Kacha Bira. Towns in Hadero Tunto include Hadero and Tunto. Hadero Tunto was part of former Omo Sheleko and Kacha Bira woreda. The majority of the population in the woreda is Hadiya nation which accommodates 75 percent of the total population based on 2007 census.

== Demographics ==
In 2007, this woreda had a total population of 98,375, of whom 48,548 were men and 49,827 women; 23,539 or 23.93% of its population were urban dwellers. The majority of the inhabitants were Protestants, with 91.8% of the population reporting that belief, 4.79% practised Ethiopian Orthodox Christianity, and 2.51% were Catholic.
