= Shashogo =

Shashogo is one of the woredas in the centeral ethiopia region of Ethiopia. Part of the Hadiya Zone, Shashogo is bordered on the south by the Kembata Tembaro Zone, on the west by Limo, on the northwest by Ana Lemo, on the northeast by the Silt'e Zone, and on the southeast by the Alaba special woreda.

== Demographics ==
Based on the 2007 Census conducted by the CSA, this woreda has a total population of 103,722, of whom 52,435 are men and 51,287 women; 8,219 or 7.92% of its population are urban dwellers. The majority of the inhabitants were Protestants, with 51.96% of the population reporting that belief, 42.48% were Muslim, and 4.96% practiced Ethiopian Orthodox Christianity.
