= Doyogena (woreda) =

Doyogena is one of the woredas in the Southern Nations, Nationalities, and Peoples' Region of Ethiopia. Part of the Kembata Tembaro Zone, Doyogena is bordered on the south by Kacha Bira, on the west and north by the Hadiya Zone, and on the east by Angacha. Towns in Doyogena include Doyogena. Doyogena was separated from Angacha woreda.

== Demographics ==
Based on the 2007 Census conducted by the CSA, this woreda has a total population of 78,634, of whom 38,605 are men and 40,029 women; 6,722 or 8.55% of its population are urban dwellers. The majority of the inhabitants were Protestants, with 81.92% of the population reporting that belief, 11.06% were Catholic, and 6.27% practiced Ethiopian Orthodox Christianity.
