= Limo (woreda) =

District in the Central Ethiopia Regional State, Ethiopia

Coordinates: 7°40′N 38°00′E

Leemo (also spelled Lemo) is one of the woredas in the Central Ethiopia Regional State of Ethiopia. The relationship of the name of this woreda to that of the medieval kingdom in the Gibe region is unclear. A part of the Hadiya Zone, Limo is bordered on the south by the Kembata Tembaro Zone, on the southwest by Duna and Soro, on the west by Gomibora, on the northwest by Misha, on the northeast by Ana Lemo, and on the southeast by Shashogo. Towns in Lemo include Belesa and Lisana. The town of Hosaena is surrounded by Limo. Parts of Limo woreda were separated to create Ana Lemo, Hosaena, Mirab Azernet Berbere and Misraq Azernet Berbere woredas.

Limo has 67 kilometers of all-weather roads and 56 kilometers of dry-weather roads, for an average road density of 123 kilometers per 1000 square kilometers.

During the 2000 general elections, when voters at the polling station in Nabor kebele protested Ethiopian People's Revolutionary Democratic Front cadres, kebele officials and even National Election Board of Ethiopia officials coercing voters to vote for the ruling party over the Hadiya National Democratic Organization, "the officials and cadres became nervous and the police were ordered to shoot into the crowd of protesting voters. People panicked and ran away, but left on the ground were two dead women and several injured."

== Demographics ==
Based on the 2007 Census conducted by the CSA, this woreda has a total population of 118,594, of whom 58,666 are men and 59,928 women; 2,049 or 1.73% of its population are urban dwellers. The majority of the inhabitants were Protestants, with 74.07% of the population reporting that belief, 12.37% were Muslim, 7.2% practiced Ethiopian Orthodox Christianity, and 6.14% were Catholic.

The 1994 national census reported a total population for this woreda of 287,430 of whom 143,587 were males and 143,843 were females; 8,743 or 3.04% of its population were urban dwellers. The five largest ethnic groups reported in Konteb were the Hadiya (62.13%), the Silte (30.3%), the Amhara (3.05%), the Kambaata (2.67%), and the Sebat Bet Gurage (0.45%); all other ethnic groups made up 3.4% of the population. Hadiya is spoken as a first language by 57.81%, 31.35% Silte, 6.63% spoke Amharic and 3.36% spoke Kambaata; the remaining 0.85% spoke all other primary languages reported. 58.52% of the population said they were Muslim, 22.09% embraced Protestants, 18.36% were Ethiopian Orthodox Christianity, and 0.45% Catholic. Concerning education, 30.97% of the population were considered literate, which is less than the Zone average of 33.01%. Concerning sanitary conditions, 68.48% of the urban houses and 21.33% of all houses had access to safe drinking water at the time of the census; 48.52% of the urban and 5.71% of all houses had toilet facilities.
