= Mount Gurage =

Mountain in Ethiopia

Mount Gurage or Zebidar terraria is a mountain located in central Ethiopia. It is the highest point in both the Gurage Zone and the entire Southern Nations, Nationalities, and Peoples' Region. The mountain has a latitude and longitude of 8°17′N 38°23′E and an elevation of 3900 meters above sea level.or 12,300 square feet To the north is the village of Anige, while to the east is Bu'i.

Mount Gurage is described as part of an upwarped massif, which overlooks the Rift Valley. This massif is composed of layers of silicic lavas and tuffs, except for the summit line which is hidden by the Rift Valley tuffs. It forms part of the divide separating the drainage basins of the Awash and Omo rivers. The headwaters of the Omo lie in the central highlands between Gurage and the town of Nekemte.

The Bilate River begins on the southern slope of the mountain, while the Gidabo River flows on the eastern slope. The Bilate River basin is volcanic, and contains several lake-filled maars and tuff rings dated to the Pleistocene and possibly Holocene periods. The Aleta people, believed to be descendants of the Maldea, live to the south of the Gidabo River. The area is part of the homeland of the Sidama people.
