= Bitena =

Town in Wolaita, Ethiopia

Bitena: Biixxanna (Wolaytta); ቢጠና (Amharic)
- Town
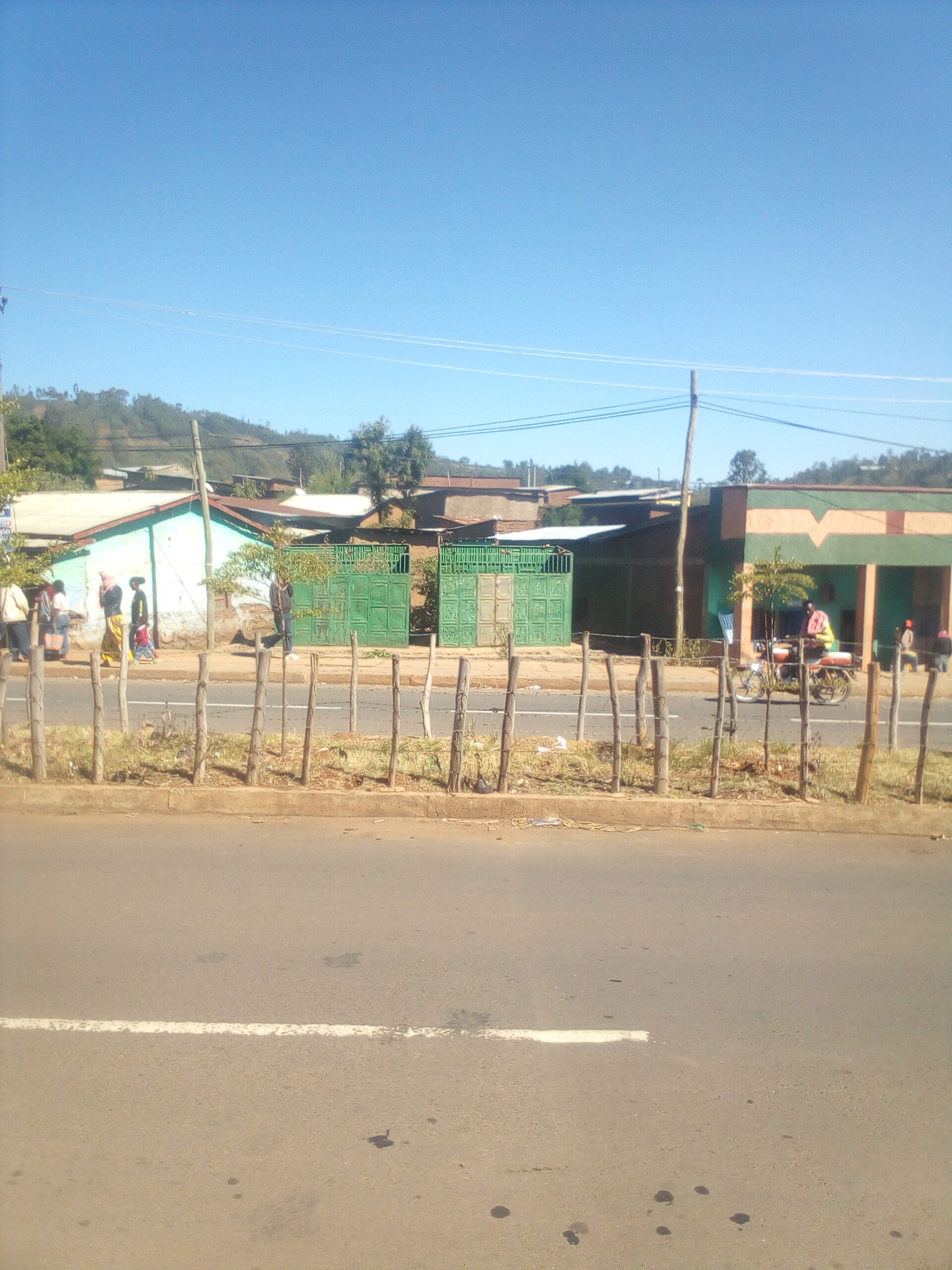
- Road in Bitana town

- Location within Wolayita Location within Ethiopia
- Coordinates: 6°57′49″N 38°02′04″E
- Country: Ethiopia
- Region: South Ethiopia Regional State
- Zone: Wolaita
- District: Diguna Fango

Population (2007)
  - Total: 13,294
- Time zone: UTC+3 (EAT)

Bitena (Amharic: ቢጠና; Wolayttattuwa: Biixxanna) is a town in Wolayita Zone, South Ethiopia Regional State, Ethiopia. It is administrative capital of Diguna Fango district of Wolayita Zone, Ethiopia. Bitena is located about 355 km away from Addis Ababa to the south on the path Addis-Awasa-Dimtu-Sodo and 45 km away from Sodo, the capital of Wolaita Zone. It also specifically located between 22 km West of Dimtu town and 7 km northeast of Kercheche town. Bitena lies between 6°57'52.6"N 38°02'08.7"E.

== Demography ==
Based on the 2007 population projection by the Central Statistical Agency of Ethiopia, Bitena has a total population of 13,294, of whom 8,855 are women and 4,439 are men. The majority of the inhabitants were Protestants (96.61%) and 2.0% practiced Ethiopian Orthodox Christianity, and 1.39% were Catholics.
