= Gibe (woreda) =

Gibe is one of the woredas in the Southern Nations, Nationalities, and Peoples' Region of Ethiopia. Part of the Hadiya Zone, Gibe is bordered on the south by Gomibora, on the west by the Yem Special Woreda, and on the north and east by Misha. Towns in Misha include Homecho. It was part of former Konteb woreda.

== Demographics ==
Based on the 2007 census conducted by the CSA, this woreda has a total population of 109,256, of whom 54,224 are men and 55,032 women; 5,066 or 4.64% of its population are urban dwellers. The majority of the inhabitants were Protestants, with 92.87% of the population reporting that belief, and 5.73% practiced Ethiopian Orthodox Christianity.
