= Gomibora =

Woredas in southern Ethiopia

Gomibora is one of the woredas in the Southern Nations, Nationalities, and Peoples' Region of Ethiopia. Part of the Hadiya Zone, Gomibora is bordered on the south by Soro, on the west by the Yem special woreda, on the north by Gibe, on the northeast by Misha, and on the east by Limo. Gomibora was part of Soro woreda.

== Demographics ==
Based on the 2007 Census conducted by the CSA, this woreda has a total population of 93,141, of whom 46,624 are men and 46,517 women; none of its population are urban dwellers. The majority of the inhabitants were Protestants, with 91.53% of the population reporting that belief, 5.16% were Catholic, and 1.58% practiced Ethiopian Orthodox Christianity.
