= Duna (woreda) =

Duna is one of the woredas in the Southern Nations, Nationalities, and Peoples' Region of Ethiopia. Part of the Hadiya Zone, Duna is bordered on the east and south by the Kembata Tembaro Zone, on the northwest by Soro, and on the northeast by Limo. Duna was part of Soro woreda. It consists of 32 rural kebeles. also the woreda found at a distance of 42 km south west from zonal administration headquarter Hossana.

== Demographics ==
Based on the 2007 Census conducted by the CSA, this woreda has a total population of 122,087, of whom 60,866 are men and 61,221 women; 5,778 or 4.73% of its population are urban dwellers. The majority of the inhabitants were Protestants, with 84.92% of the population reporting that belief, 8.32% were Catholic, and 5.41% practiced Ethiopian Orthodox Christianity.

== Geographic location ==
Duna woreda has geographic coordinates of 7°20'07 N and 37°39'09.42 E at the woreda administration town and a maximum elevation of 2957 m at Sengiye mountain peak, with 2245 meters above sea level at Awonda plane in Sanna river outlet from the woreda.
