= Shinshicho =

Shinshicho is a town in southern Ethiopia, located in the Kembata Tembaro Zone of the Southern Nations, Nationalities and Peoples' Region. This town has a latitude and longitude of 7°12′20″N 37°46′40″E with an elevation of 1875 meters above sea level. It was founded by the leader of the community called "Ordolo". Mr Ordolo was a warrior who survived a Sword attack while fighting Bandits who tried to rob the local market during the early days of establishment of Shinshicho. The town was earlier called "Ordolo dikuta/Ordolo gieyaa" till 1977. In the beginning of 2015, the city has a population of 35,000. It has 12 substandard motels and an ongoing modern hotel, a hospital and office complex constructions.

The hospital project in the town was a collaboration with a US based charity called Holt international and the community with a cost of over US$2 million. Shinshicho was the beneficiary of a project funded by the NGO WaterAid to improve its water supply. Budgeted at just under £85,000 and designed to benefit over 27,000 inhabitants, the project was completed in April 2000.

== Demographics ==
Based on figures from the Central Statistical Agency in 2005, Shinshicho has an estimated total population of 12,626 of whom 6,163 were men and 6,463 were women. The 1994 census reported this town had a total population of 6,968 of whom 3,412 were men and 3,556 were women. It is one of two towns in Kacha Bira woreda.
