= Kercheche =

Town in Wolaita, Ethiopia

Kercheche: Qarccacciya (Wolaytta); ቀርጨጬ (Amharic)
- Town
- Location within Wolayita Location within Ethiopia
- Coordinates: 6°57′9″N 37°59′7″E
- Country: Ethiopia
- Region: South Ethiopia Regional State
- Zone: Wolaita
- Woreda: Diguna Fango
- Time zone: UTC+3 (EAT)

Kercheche (Ge'ez: ቀርጨጬ) or (Wolaytta: Qarccacciya) is a town in Diguna Fango woreda, Wolayita Zone of South Ethiopia Regional State. Kercheche is about 10 km (6.2 mi) north of Bedessa and about 8 km (5.0 mi) southwest of Bitena on the road of Sodo-Dimtu Hawassa. The approximate distance from the city of Addis Ababa to the town is 362 km (225 mi) on Addis-Hawassa-Dimtu-Sodo road. It is 38 km (24 mi) from Sodo, the capital of Wolayita Zone. The coordinate point of Kercheche lies between 6°57'9"N 37°59'7"E. The amenities in the town are 24-hours electric light, pure water service, kindergarten, primary school, high school, all time market, health stations and others. Kercheche has also dry weather and all weather roads which connect it to other surrounding areas.

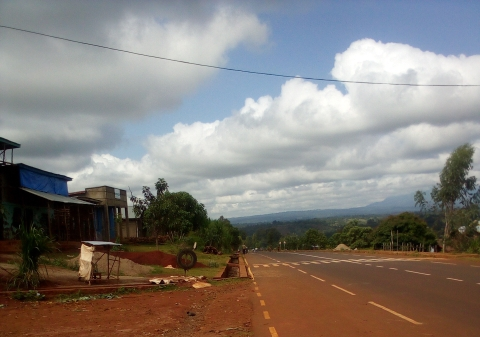
