= Ana Lemo =

Coordinates: 9.433333°N 37.066667°E

Ana Lemo is one of the woredas in the Southern Nations, Nationalities, and Peoples' Region of Ethiopia. A part of the Hadiya Zone, Ana Lemo is bordered on the southwest by Limo, on the north by the Silt'e Zone, and on the southeast by Shashogo. Ana Lemo was part of Limo woreda.

== Demographics ==
Based on the 2007 Census conducted by the CSA, this woreda has a total population of 71,963, of whom 35,330 are men and 36,633 women; 2,380 or 3.31% of its population are urban dwellers. The majority of the inhabitants were Muslim, with 54.83% of the population reporting that belief, 35.55% were Protestants, and 9.22% practiced Ethiopian Orthodox Christianity.
