= Shanto, Wolaita =

Town in Wolaita, Ethiopia

Shanto: Shantto (Wolaytta); ሻንቶ (Amharic)
- Town
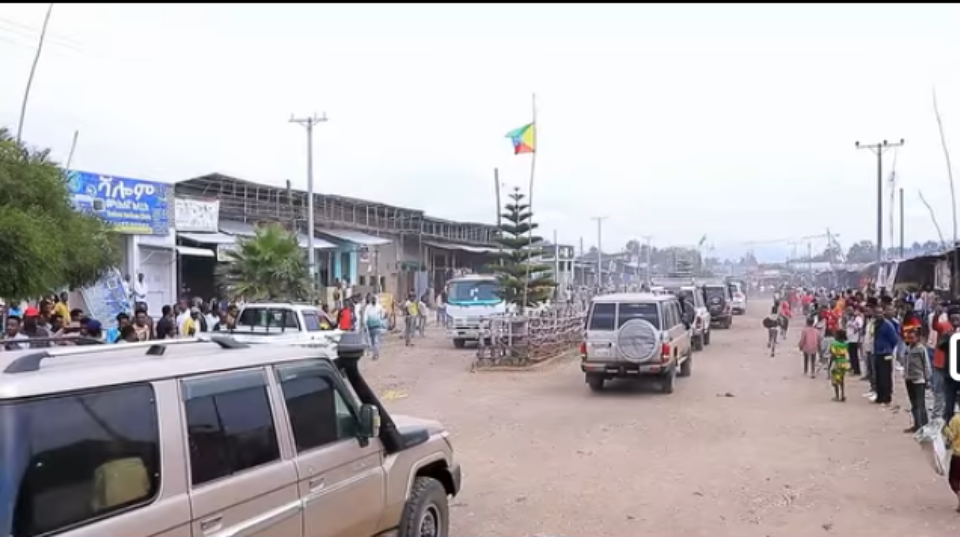
- Entrance to Shanto

- Location within Wolayita Location within Ethiopia
- Coordinates: 7°1′23″N 37°51′31″E
- Country: Ethiopia
- Region: South Ethiopia Regional State
- Zone: Wolaita
- Woreda: Damot Pulasa

Population (2023)
  - Total: 15,020
  - Males: 7,434
  - Females: 7,586
- Time zone: UTC+3 (EAT)

Shanto (Ge'ez: ሻንቶ, Wolayttattuwa: Shantto) is a town and separate district in southern Ethiopia. Located in the Wolaita Zone of the South Ethiopia Regional State, This town has a latitude and longitude of 7°01′ 23"N 37°51′49"E with an elevation of 1953 meters above sea level. The town is the administrative center of Damot Pulasa woreda. There are various development works in Shanto town, including 24-hour electricity services, health facilities, schools, public libraries and other services.

== Demography ==
Total population of the town as conducted by central statistical agency of Ethiopia in 2023 is 15,020. Among this figures male population constitutes 7,434 and Females counted 7,586 from total population.
