= Mudula =

- Location within Ethiopia
- Coordinates: 7°17′N 37°33′E
- Country: Ethiopia
- Region: Central Ethiopia Regional State
- special woreda: Tembaro Special Woreda
- special Woreda: Tembaro

Population (2005)
  - Total: 5,195
- Time zone: UTC+3 (EAT)

Mudula is a town in Central Ethiopia Regional State. This town has a latitude and longitude of 7°17′N 37°33′E with an elevation of 2100 meters above sea level. It is the largest town in Tembaro special woreda.

In 1997 the teachers of the Mudula school found a new way to address the high female drop-out rate. They formed a Girls' Advisory Committee which noted when girls dropped out of school, visiting their homes and trying to persuade their parents to send the girls back to school. The approach was highly successful, and is now being followed by many other schools financed by the USAID Community Schools Grants Program.

Many in the area are malnourished, and are susceptible to Malaria. In July 2003 World Vision began malaria control in their therapeutic feeding center (TFC) in Mudula. The TFC has reported that of the total admission of 153 severely malnourished children, 142 had proven cases of malaria. 225 parents were also treated for malaria. World Vision is providing training and insecticide treated nets for all children discharged from the TFC.

Based on figures from the Central Statistical Agency in 2005, Mudula has an estimated total population of 5,195 of whom 2,511 are men and 2,684 are women. The 1994 national census reported this town had a total population of 2,867, of whom 1,390 were men and 1,477 were women.
