= Soro (woreda) =

District in the Southern Nations, Nationalities and Peoples' Region, Ethiopia

Coordinates: 7°30′N 37°35′E

Soro is one of the woredas in the Southern Nations, Nationalities, and Peoples' Region of Ethiopia. Part of the Hadiya Zone, Soro consists large population of Hadiya and Danta dubamo people, bordered on the south by the Kembata Tembaro Zone, on the southwest by the Dawro Zone, on the west by the Omo River which separates it from the Oromia Region, on the north by Gomibora, on the northeast by Limo, and on the southeast by Duna. The administrative center of this woreda is Gimbichu; other towns in Soro include Jajura. Parts of Soro were separated to create Duna and Gomibora woredas.

== Overview ==
Soro has 19 kilometers of all-weather roads and 48 kilometers of dry-weather roads, for an average road density of 54 kilometers per 1000 square kilometers.

During the 2000 general elections, local police beat Selfamo Kintamo, an elderly supporter of the Southern Ethiopia Peoples' Democratic Coalition (SEPDC) and the uncle of a SEPDC parliamentarian. The US Department of State reports this was because of Selfamo's support of the SEPDC. During the same election, an activist of the Hadiya National Democratic Organization and his wife were killed in Omoshoro kebele by a grenade allegedly thrown by a member of the Ethiopian People's Revolutionary Democratic Front (EPRDF) for reporting voting irregularities to the local representative of the National Election Board of Ethiopia (NEBE). When the teen-aged son of the dead couple learned of their deaths, he obtained a sword and sought the EPRDF member avenge his parents' death, but when he learned the party member had fled the scene, he instead killed the NEBE representative.

== Demographics ==
Based on the 2007 Census conducted by the CSA, this woreda has a total population of 188,858, of whom 94,363 are men and 94,495 women; 16,885 or 8.94% of its population are urban dwellers. The majority of the inhabitants were Protestants, with 88.14% of the population reporting that belief, 5.28% practiced Ethiopian Orthodox Christianity, and 4.94% were Catholic.

The 1994 national census reported a total population for this woreda of 287,589 of whom 143,835 were men and 143,754 were women; 9,578 or 3.33% of its population were urban dwellers. The five largest ethnic groups reported in Soro were the Hadiya (67.57%), Danta [Dubammo] (24.22%), the Kambaata (2.67%), the Timbaro (1.49%), and the Amhara (1.23%); all other ethnic groups made up 2.82% of the population. Hadiya was spoken as a first language by 84.13%, 3.0% Kizigna (Dubammo language), 2.17% Kambaata, 1.14% Tembaro, and 6.75% spoke Amharic; the remaining 2.81% spoke all other primary languages reported. 60.15% of the population said they were Protestants, 19.04% embraced Ethiopian Orthodox Christianity, 11.39% were Catholic, 4.46% practiced traditional religions, and 0.95% were Muslim. Concerning education, 29.62% of the population were considered literate, which is less than the Zone average of 33.01%. Concerning sanitary conditions, 68.48% of the urban houses and 21.33% of all houses had access to safe drinking water at the time of the census; 51.53% of the urban and 9.49% of all houses had toilet facilities.
