= Shone, Ethiopia =

Coordinates: 7°08′25″N 37°57′15″E

Shone is the major town of Badawacho, Hadiya Zone, Central Ethiopia. The major landmarks are St Georgis Orthodox Church and the Shone Union Medical College, Health Centre. The town was the constituency which in the May 2000 elections elected Beyene Petros, leader of the SEPDU, and chairman of the opposition CAFPDE.
