= Misha (woreda) =

Geographic district in Ethiopia

Misha is one of the woredas in the Southern Nations, Nationalities, and Peoples' Region of Ethiopia. Part of the Hadiya Zone, Misha is bordered on the south by Gomibora, on the southwest by Gibe, on the west by the Yem Special Woreda, on the north by the Gurage Zone, on the east by the Silt'e Zone, and on the southeast by Limo. Towns in Misha include Geja and Morsito. It was part of former Konteb woreda.

== Demographics ==
Based on the 2007 Census conducted by the CSA, this woreda has a total population of 127,318, of whom 61,939 are men and 65,379 women; 5,939 or 4.67% of its population are urban dwellers. The majority of the inhabitants were Protestants, with 71.05% of the population reporting that belief, 25.17% practiced Ethiopian Orthodox Christianity, 2.61% were Muslim, and 1.05% Catholic.
