= Tembaro special woreda =

Tembaro Special Woreda (Amharic: ጠምባሮ ልዩ ወረዳ) is one of the woredas in the Central Ethiopia Regional State of Ethiopia. Tembaro is bordered on the south by the Dawro Zone, on the north by the Hadiya Zone, on the west Hadiya and Dawro on the east by Hadero Tunto, and on the southeast by the Wolayita Zone. Towns in Tembaro include Mudula, Keleta, Ambukuna and Hodo. Tembaro Special Woreda was also formerly called Omo Sheleko woreda. The Tembaro Special Woreda became a special woreda during the reformation of the former Southern Nations, Nationalities, and Peoples' Region into the new Central Ethiopia Regional State on 19 August, 2023. This day is a historical day for the Tembaro people.

== Demographics ==
Based on the 2007 Census conducted by the CSA, this woreda has a total population of 480,573, of whom 235,334 are men and 245,239 women; 45,615 or 7.21% of its population are urban dwellers. The majority of the inhabitants were Protestants, with 77.69% of the population reporting that belief, 14.9% practiced Ethiopian Orthodox Christianity, 3.36% were Catholic, 2.07% were Muslim, and 1.17% observed traditional beliefs.
