= Dimtu =

City in Wolaita, Ethiopia

Dimtu: Dinttuwa (Wolaytta); ዲምቱ (Amharic); Bilate Tena
- City
- Dimtu
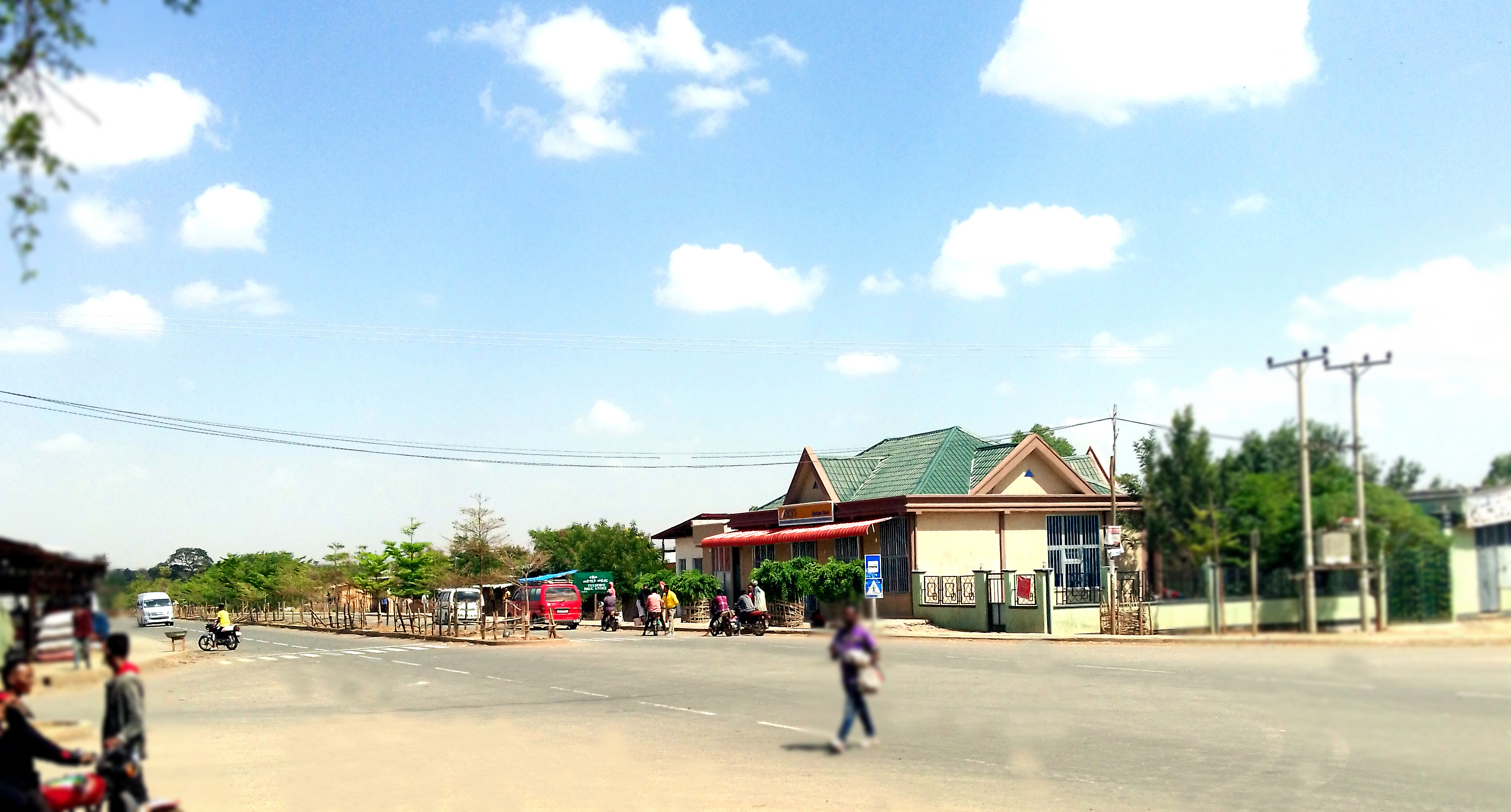
- Dimtu town

- Dimtu Location within Wolayita Dimtu Location within Ethiopia
- Coordinates: 6°55′N 38°6′E
- Country: Ethiopia
- Region: South Ethiopia Regional State
- Zone: Wolaita
- Woreda: Diguna Fango

Government
  - Mayor: Zekarias Wontamo

Area
  - Urban: 6.48 km^{2} (2.50 sq mi)
- Elevation: 1,400 m (4,600 ft)

Population (2018)
  - City: 25,294
- Time zone: UTC+3 (EAT)

Dimtu (Ge'ez: ዲምቱ) or Wolaita Dimtu (Ge'ez: ወላይታ ዲምቱ) or Bilate Tena (Ge'ez: ብላቴ ጤና) is a city administrator in Wolayita Zone, South Ethiopia Region. It has an elevation between 1,000 and 1,600 metres above sea level. It was part of the former Damot Weyde (woreda) of Wolayita Zone, near to the Sodo Zuria woreda. It was also under the Diguna Fango woreda. Some writers mention the town as Bilate Tena in their books and journals. Among them, Getahun Garedew, former Head Officer in Education Bureau of Southern Nations, Nationalities, and Peoples' Region, and State Minister of Ministry of Education since 2020, is the anterior. In the book Local Adaptation Practices in Response to Climate Change in the Bilate River Basin, Southern Ethiopia, he used these two names, Dimtu and Bilate Tena, in a similar way.

== History ==
David Buxton stated in his book that Dimtu was the name of a market, and it was near the Bilate River. As unwritten source reveals that the name was derived from the word "Dantto", which in Wolaytta language means the junction. It was named so because the market is located where the Bilate River and the "Qocuwaa" River (which flows near Dimtu) meet.

Dimtu is the oldest town in the Wolaita Zone, next to Sodo, the capital of Wolaita. About 81% of the town has electricity. The roads are largely asphalt roads, and is located 333 km from Addis Ababa to the South-West, and 68 km from Sodo.

== Demographics ==
Based on the 2018 population projection by the Central Statistical Agency of Ethiopia, Dimtu has a total population of 25,294, of whom 15,855 are men and 9,439 are women. The majority of the inhabitants were Protestants (94.61%) and 4.10% practiced Ethiopian Orthodox Christianity, 0.0076% were Muslims, and 1.28% were Catholics.

== Education ==
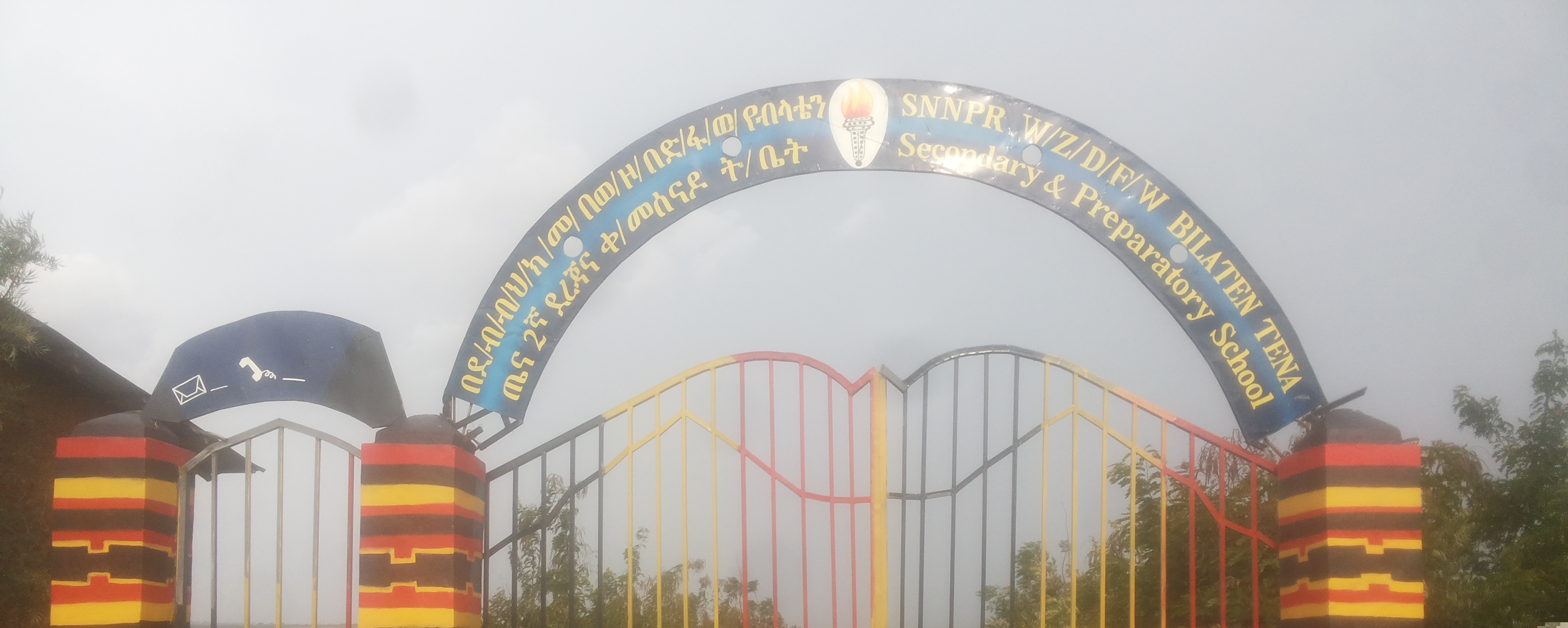
Gates of Bilate Tena Secondary School

The city has Bilate Tena Primary School and Bilate Tena Secondary and Preparatory School (a middle and high school). The primary school building is older than the secondary and preparatory school, being one of the primary schools that was established in the 1940s after Haile Selassie I allowed education reform. As of a 2003 report, 400 primary schools operate in Ethiopia.

Bilate Tena Secondary and Preparatory School was established in 2009. In 2010, it was opened by Ambassador Teshome Toga, who was raised in the Dimtu area.

For the schools that are near the border, its compound has a multicultural environment and builds relationships with their neighbors, including the Sidama and Oromo people.

== Climate ==
The city is located in lowland areas, and its temperature lies between 14 and 30°C in summer, and 8 and 24 °C in winter.
