= Durame =

Town in the Southern Nations, Nationalities, and Peoples' Region, Ethiopia

Durame is a town in southeastern Ethiopia. The administrative center of the Kembata Tembaro Zone of the Southern Nations, Nationalities and Peoples Region (SNNPR), this town has a latitude and longitude of 7°14′N 37°53′E with an elevation of 2101 meters above sea level. It is surrounded by Damboya woreda. Materials on the Nordic Africa Institute website, describe Durame as the main town for the Kambaata-speaking people.

According to the SNNPR's Bureau of Finance and Economic Development, as of 2003 Durame's amenities include digital telephone access, postal service, 24-hour electrical service, two bank branches (Global bank and Commercial Bank of Ethiopia), and a hospital.

Following the Italian invasion, on 8 May 1936 a civil war erupted between the local population and the remaining Amhara, forcing local missionaries to evacuate the area. In 1962 a road linking Durame with Hosaena was constructed; bridges over the Markos and Dembe rivers were built in 1968.

== Demographics ==
Based on the 2007 Census conducted by the CSA, this woreda has a total population of 24,472 of whom 12,173 are men and 12,299 women. The majority of the inhabitants were Protestants, with 86.51% of the population reporting that belief, 7.39% practiced Ethiopian Orthodox Christianity, and 4.93% were Catholic.

The 1994 census reported this town had a total population of 7,092 of whom 3,577 were men and 3,515 were women. It is the larger of two towns in Kedida Gamela woreda.
