= Bilate River =

Location
- Country: Ethiopia

Physical characteristics
- Source
  - elevation: 3,382 m (11,096 ft)
- Mouth
  - coordinates: 6°37′54″N 37°59′6″E
  - elevation: 1,175 m (3,855 ft)
- Length: ~250 km (160 mi)
- Basin size: 5,754 km^{2} (2,222 sq mi)
- Discharge
  - average: 16.6 m^{3}/s (590 cu ft/s)

Basin features
- Cities: Dimtu
- Tributaries
  - right: Badessa river; Charake river

The Bilate is a river of south-central Ethiopia. It rises on the southwestern slopes of Mount Gurage near 6°2′N 38°7′E, flowing south along the western side of the Great Rift Valley, to empty into Lake Abaya at 6°37′54″N 37°59′6″E. It is the longest river flowing into Lake Abaya and also the one with the highest discharge. The 250 km long river is not navigable and has no notable tributaries. Along the middle of its course, the Bilate flows past the Bilate River volcanic field and its most territory covered by Halaba Zone.

David Buxton recorded its importance as defining the boundary between the Sidamo district on the eastern side, and the Wolaita district on the western; he also described finding a weekly market beside a ford named Dimtu.

== See also ==
- List of rivers of Ethiopia
