= Kembata Zone =

Zone in the Central Ethiopia Regional State

Coordinates: 7°15′N 37°50′E

Map of the regions and zones of Ethiopia

Kembata(Amharic ከምባታ) is one of the zones of the Central Ethiopia Regional State of Ethiopia. The Central Ethiopia Regional State which was established on August 19, 2024 is divided into seven zones: Hadiya, Gurage, Siltie, East Gurage, Kembata, Halaba, and Yem zones, and three special districts (Tembaro, Mareko, and Qebena special districts). Kambata Zone (Amharic ከምባታ ዞን) is named after the Kambaata people. The Kambata language, Kambaatissa (ከምባቲሳ), belongs to the Cushtic language family in general and the Highland Eastern Cushitic in particular. The Kambata/Kambaatissa language group within the Highland Eastern Cushitic comprises Kambaatissa, Tembaro, Halaba and Qebena.

The Kambata Zone is bordered on the south by Wolayita, on the southwest by Dawro, on west by Tembaro special woreda, on the northwest by Hadiya, on the north by Gurage, on the east by the Alaba special woreda, and on the southeast by an exclave of the Hadiya Zone. The administrative center is Durame; other important towns include Shinshicho, Doyogena, Hadero, Damboya and Marre. Other local landmarks include the three mountains of Ambaricho, Kataa, and Datoo, and the hot springs at Motokoma. Mount Hambaricho is one of the highest mountains in the Southern Ethiopia, and it is also a historical center of the Kambata people. The longest river in the area is the Lagabora which in Kambaata means the "river of Bora".

Kembata has 217 kilometers of all-weather roads and 140 kilometers of dry-weather roads, for an average road density of 249 kilometers per 1000 square kilometers. The Central Statistical Agency (CSA) reported that 8,364 tons of coffee were produced in Gurage, Hadiya and Kembata in the year ending in 2005, based on inspection records from the Ethiopian Coffee and Tea authority. This represents 8.33% of the SNNPR's output and 3.36% of Ethiopia's total output.

== Demographics ==
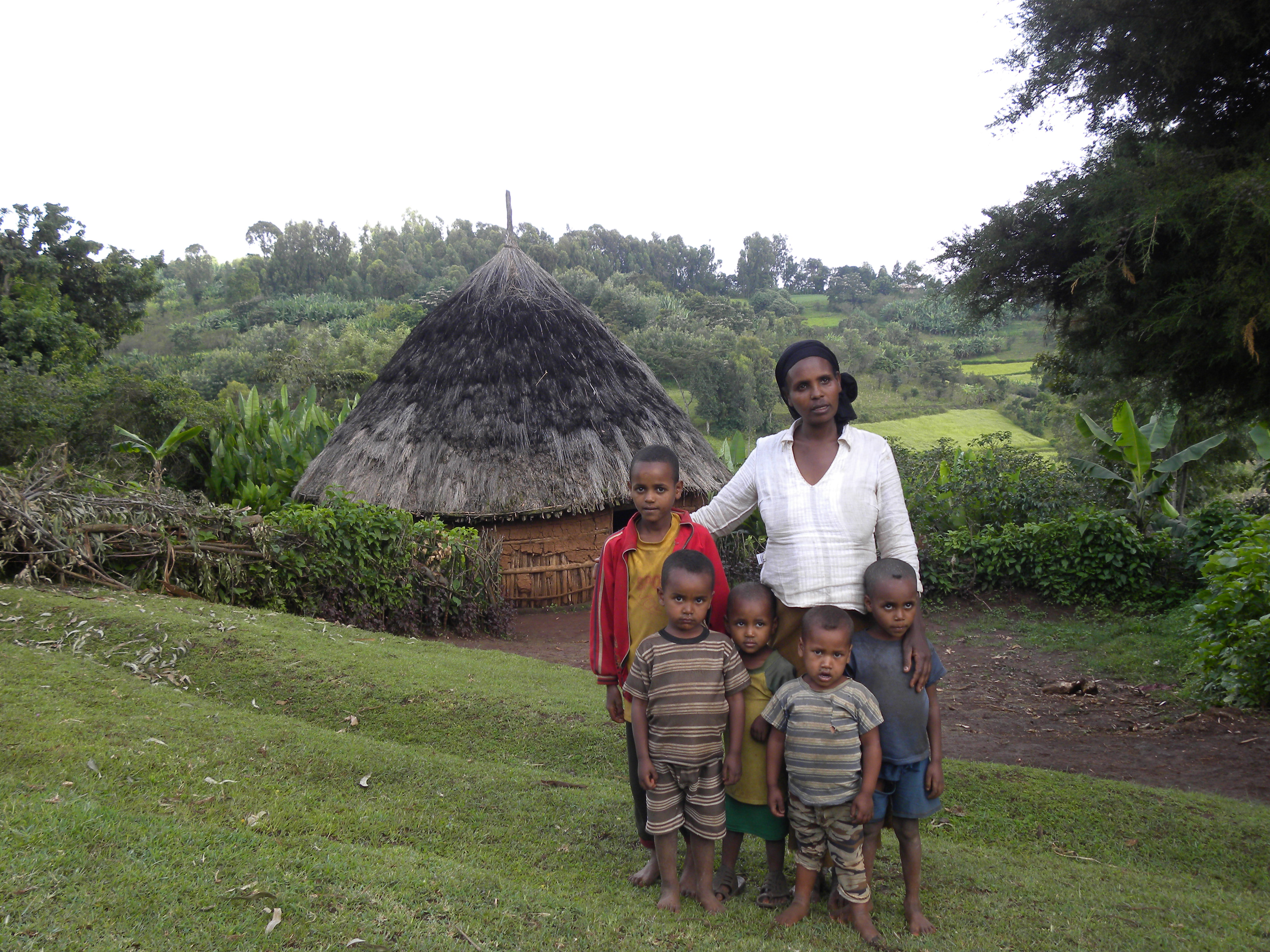
Kambaata mother with her children in front of their tukul close to the town of Hadero (Kembata Tembaro Zone)

Based on the 2007 Census conducted by the CSA, this Zone has a total population of 680,837, of whom 336,676 are men and 344,161 women; with an area of 1,355.89 square kilometers, Kembata has a population density of 502.13. While 97,797 or 14.36% are urban inhabitants, a further 35 individuals are pastoralists. A total of 122,580 households were counted in this Zone, which results in an average of 5.55 persons to a household, and 118,077 housing units. The five largest ethnic groups reported were the Kambaata (61.48%), the Tembaro (26.46%), the Donga (14.81%) the Hadiya (5.5%), and the Wolayta (1.75%); all other ethnic groups made up 1.73% of the population. Kambaata was spoken as a first language by 61.48%, 26.46% spoke Tembaro, 5.56% spoke Hadiya, and 1.29% Wolaytta; the remaining 1.13% spoke all other primary languages reported. 83.6% of the population said they were Protestants, 6.55% practiced Ethiopian Orthodox Christianity, 5.94% embraced Catholicism, and 3.07% were Muslim.

In the 1994 Census the Kembata, Alaba, and Tembaro Zone had a population of 727,340 in 137,259 households, of whom 362,921 were men and 364,419 women; 50,987 or 7.01% of its population were urban dwellers. The five largest ethnic groups reported were the Kambaata (55.21%), the Alaba (13.78%), the Tembaro (20.9%), the Silte (8.52%) and the Hadiya (5.47%); all other ethnic groups made up 6.07% of the population. Kambaata was spoken as a first language by 55.44%, 13.99% spoke Alaba, 10.71% Tembaro, 8.37% Silte, and 5.61% spoke Hadiya; the remaining 5.88% spoke all other primary languages reported. 48.96% of the population said they were Protestants, 29.84% were Muslim, 12.22% practiced Ethiopian Orthodox Christianity, 6.21% embraced Catholicism, and 1.53% observed traditional religions.

According to a May 24, 2004 World Bank memorandum, 2% of the inhabitants of Kembata Tembaro have access to electricity; the zone has a road density of 109.8 kilometers per 1000 square kilometers, compared to the national average of 30 kilometers; the average rural household has 0.6 hectare of land, compared to the national average of 1.01 hectare of land, and an average of 0.89 for the SNNPR; the equivalent of 0.5 heads of livestock; 10.7% of the population is in non-farm related jobs, compared to the national average of 25% and a regional average of 32%. 73% of all eligible children are enrolled in primary school, and 23% in secondary schools. Although 74% of the zone is exposed to malaria, none of the area is exposed to Tsetse fly. The memorandum gave this zone a drought risk rating of 320.

== Woredas ==
Woredas of Kembata Tembaro Zone are:

- Angacha
- Damboya
- Doyogena
- Durame Town
- Hadero Tunto
- Kacha Bira
- Kedida Gamela
- Adilo Zuria

=== Former ===
- Omo Sheleko
