= Hadiya Zone =

Zone in the Central Regional State, Ethiopia

Coordinates: 7°40′N 37°45′E

Hadiya ሐዲያ Hossana Hosaena Hosanna
- Nicknames: Southern zones
- Location within Ethiopia Location within Africa
- Zone: Hadiya
- Established: 1886

Area
  - Land: 527 km^{2} (203 sq mi)

Population
  - Total: 3,987,365
- Time zone: UTC+3 (East Africa Time)
- Area code: (+251) 11
- HDI (2018): 0.697 medium · 1st

Map of the regions and zones of Ethiopia

Hadiya (also transliterated Hadiyya) is a zone in the Central Ethiopia Regional State of Ethiopia. This zone is named after the Hadiya of the Hadiya Kingdom, whose homeland covers part of the administrative division. Hadiya is bordered on the south by Kembata, on the southwest by the Dawro Zone, on the west by the Omo River which separates it from Oromia Region and the Yem Special Woreda, on the north by Gurage, on the northeast by Silte, and on the east by the Alaba Zone; the woredas of Mirab Badawacho and Misraq Badawacho form an exclave separated from the rest of the zone by Kembata. The administrative center of Hadiya is Hosaena.

Hadiya has 294 kilometers of all-weather roads and 350 kilometers of dry-weather roads, for an average road density of 169 kilometers per 1000 square kilometers. According to the Central Statistical Agency (CSA) 8,364.00 tons of coffee were produced in Gurage, Hadiya and KT combined in the year ending in 2005, representing 8.33% of the Southern Nations, Nationalities and Peoples' Region (SNNPR)'s output and 3.36% of Ethiopia's total output.

== 2000 general elections ==
According to the leadership of the Southern Ethiopia Peoples' Democratic Coalition, 667 of their members in the Hadiya Zone were arrested prior to the 2000 general elections, all of whom were charged with the same four counts: incitement against the government; incitement not to pay taxes and fertilizer loans; cutting government-owned forest; and illegal use of grazing lands. At year's end, 104 members remained in zonal prisons in Hosana and Durame; government officials reported a lower number.

Due to widespread protests over the handling of the election in Hadiya, elections in seven constituencies were re-run on 25 June of that year, which involved several teams of diplomatic observers, and polling stations were staffed by National Election Board of Ethiopia coordinators from the capital (due to mistrust of local officials), which resulted with the opposition party (Hadiya National Democratic Organization, HNDO) winning six of seven of the races. However, in a press conference held by Dr. Beyene Petros in the following month, he accused local cadres of the ruling party of avenging their electoral losses, telling drought victims in Hadiya, who asked for assistance, to go "ask Beyene". Hadiya informants reported intimidation and harassment of HNDO members by cadres of the ruling party in the aftermath of the election, to show that they were still in control of the kebele and woreda structures.

== Demographics ==
Based on the 2007 Census conducted by the CSA, this Zone has a total population of 1,231,196, of whom 612,026 are men and 619,170 women; with an area of 3,593.31 square kilometers, Hadiya has a population density of 342.64. While 134,041 or 10.89% are urban inhabitants, a further 157 individuals are pastoralists. A total of 231,846 households were counted in this Zone, which results in an average of 5.31 persons to a household, and 223,403 housing units. The largest ethnic groups reported in Hadiya zone were the Hadiya (90.04%), the Kambaata (1.96%), the Gurage (1.54%) and the Amhara (1.31%); all other ethnic groups made up 5.15% of the population. Hadiya is spoken as a first language by 80.94, 2.24% spoke Amharic, and 1.94% spoke Kambaata; the remaining 4.88% spoke all other primary languages reported. 75.35% of the population said they were Protestants, 11.13% were Muslim, 8.45% practiced Ethiopian Orthodox Christianity, and 4.31% Catholic.

The 1994 national census reported a total population for this Zone of 1,050,151, of whom 521,807 were men and 528,344 women; 67,705 or 6.45% of its population were urban dwellers at the time. The five largest ethnic groups reported in Hadiya were the Hadiya (78.16%), the Silte (10.13%), the Kambaata (2.22%), the Soddo Gurage (1.8%), and the Amhara (1.63%); all other ethnic groups made up 6.06% of the population. Hadiya is spoken as a first language by 79.6%, 10.13% Silte, 3.2% spoke Kambaata, 2.65% spoke Amharic, and 1% spoke Soddo Gurage; the remaining 3.42% spoke all other primary languages reported. 46.81% of the population said they were Protestants, 22.23% practiced Ethiopian Orthodox Christianity, 22.14% were Muslim, 5.38% Catholic, and 1.46% observed traditional religions.

According to a May 24, 2004 World Bank memorandum, 6% of the inhabitants of Hadiya have access to electricity, this zone has a road density of 104.1 kilometers per 1000 square kilometers (compared to the national average of 30 kilometers), the average rural household has 0.6 hectare of land (compared to the national average of 1.01 hectare of land and an average of 0.89 for the SNNPR) the equivalent of 0.6 heads of livestock. 22.8% of the population is in non-farm related jobs, compared to the national average of 25% and a Regional average of 32%. 74% of all eligible children are enrolled in primary school, and 21% in secondary schools. 43% of the zone is exposed to malaria, and 59% to Tsetse fly. The memorandum gave this zone a drought risk rating of 318.

== Woredas ==
Current Districts (also called woreda locally, is third level administration in Ethiopia after Zone) of Hadiya Zone are:

Districts and administrative towns
| Number | Woredas | Administrative town |
|---|---|---|
| 1 | Ameka | Geja |
| 2 | Ana Lemo | Fonko* |
| 3 | Duna | Ansho |
| 4 | Gibe | Homecho* |
| 5 | Gombora | Habicho |
| 6 | Lemo | Hosaena* |
| 7 | Mirab Badawacho | Danema |
| 8 | Mirab Soro | Dacho |
| 9 | Misha | Morsito |
| 10 | Misraq Badawacho | Shone* |
| 11 | Shashogo | Bonosha* |
| 12 | Siraro Badawacho | Hanicha |
| 13 | Soro | Gimbichu* |

* Town administrations, which are considered as Woreda for all administrative purposes. Jajura which is in the Soro woreda is also one of town administration in this Zone.

Former woredas are:

- Badawacho
- Konteb
