= List of highest major summits of Africa =

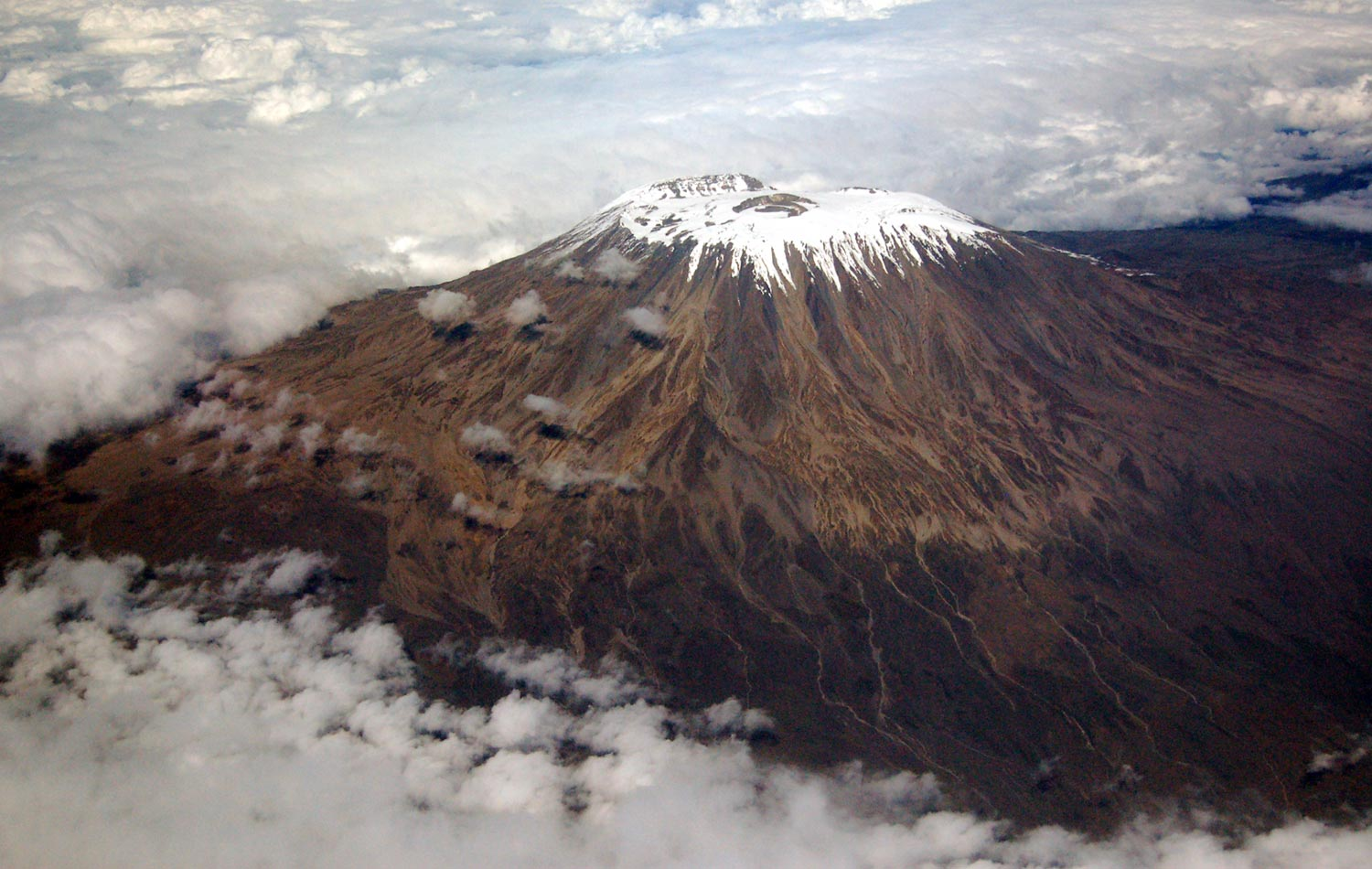
Kilimanjaro from the air.

This is an incomplete list of the highest mountains of Africa. Peaks with less than 500 metres (1,640 ft) of topographic prominence (such as Mount Kenya's Nelion and Lenana peaks) are considered sub-peaks rather than independent mountains, and thus are not included.

The highest African mountain is Kilimanjaro, which has three peaks, named Kibo, Mawenzi and Shira, of which Kibo is the tallest and Mawenzi is sufficiently prominent to be a mountain. Mount Kenya is the second highest mountain in Africa which also has three main peaks, namely Batian, Nelion and Lenana Point.

Some regions are still poorly described and the list is likely to be both incomplete and not completely accurate. This is especially true for the Ethiopian Highlands, where heights on maps and in the literature differ between each other by up to 500 m. All elevations have been checked or chosen to match the Shuttle Radar Topography Mission-based contour lines in the Google terrain maps.

== List ==
| Rank | Mountain | Height (Note: Most "round" heights for mountains in the Ethiopian Highlands are crude estimates from contour lines on Google terrain maps) | | Prominence (Note: The prominence data were extracted from a combination of maps and Google terrain data. Values for mountains with prominences over 1,500 m were copied from this website) | | Range | Country | Coordinates (Note: Extracted from the Google terrain maps) | Parent mountain (Note: Here defined as the first higher 500-m-prominent mountain connected via the highest saddle) | First ascent (Note: These are the first documented ascents. Most mountains in this list are not technically difficult to climb, so that earlier local ascents are likely) |
| Rank | Mountain | m | ft | m | ft | Range | Country | Coordinates | Parent mountain | First ascent |
|---|---|---|---|---|---|---|---|---|---|---|
| 1 | Kilimanjaro (Kibo) (Note: Kibo is the tallest volcanic cone of Kilimanjaro. The highest point of Kibo is Uhuru Peak, located on its crater rim) | 5,895 | 19,341 | 5,885 | 19,308 | Kilimanjaro | Tanzania | 03°04′33″S 37°21′09″E | | 1889 |
| 2 | Mount Kenya | 5,199 | 17,057 | 3,825 | 12,549 | Mount Kenya | Kenya | 00°09′07″S 37°18′30″E | Kibo | 1899 |
| 3 | Mawenzi | 5,148 | 16,890 | 850 | 2,790 | Kilimanjaro | Tanzania | 03°05′33″S 37°27′21″E | Kibo | 1912 |
| 4 | Ngaliema / Mt Stanley | 5,109 | 16,762 | 3,951 | 12,963 | Rwenzori | DR Congo; Uganda | 00°23′08″N 29°52′21″E | Kibo | 1906 |
| 5 | Duwoni / Mt Speke | 4,890 | 16,040 | 720 | 2,360 | Rwenzori | Uganda | 00°23′53″N 29°53′33″E | Stanley | 1906 |
| 6 | Kiyanja / Mt Baker | 4,844 | 15,892 | 507 | 1,663 | Rwenzori | Uganda | 00°21′40″N 29°53′34″E | Stanley | 1906 |
| 7 | Mount Emin | 4,798 | 15,741 | 518 | 1,699 | Rwenzori | DR Congo | 00°25′42″N 29°54′00″E | Speke | 1906 |
| 8 | Mount Gessi | 4,715 | 15,469 | 565 | 1,854 | Rwenzori | Uganda | 00°25′19″N 29°55′06″E | Emin | 1906 |
| 9 | Mount Meru | 4,566 | 14,980 | 3,170 | 10,400 | Mount Meru | Tanzania | 03°14′39″S 36°45′00″E | Kibo | 1904 |
| 10 | Ras Dashen | 4,550 | 14,930 | 3,997 | 13,114 | Semien Mountains | Ethiopia | 13°14′12″N 38°22′21″E | Kenya | 1841 |
| 11 | Karisimbi | 4,507 | 14,787 | 3,312 | 10,866 | Virunga Mountains | DR Congo; Rwanda | 01°30′22″S 29°27′01″E | Stanley | 1903 |
| 12 | Kidis Yared | 4,453 | 14,610 | 730 | 2,400 | Semien Mountains | Ethiopia | 13°18′01″N 38°19′40″E | Ras Dashen | |
| 13 | Mikeno | 4,437 | 14,557 | 1,190 | 3,900 | Virunga Mountains | DR Congo | 01°27′47″S 29°25′11″E | Karisimbi | 1927 |
| 14 | Bwahit | 4,437 | 14,557 | 810 | 2,660 | Semien Mountains | Ethiopia | 13°14′37″N 38°13′03″E | Kidis Yared | |
| 15 | Portal Peaks | 4,391 | 14,406 | 565 | 1,854 | Rwenzori | Uganda | 00°24′18″N 29°57′30″E | Gessi | 1945 |
| 16 | Tullu Demtu | 4,377 | 14,360 | 2,527 | 8,291 | Bale Mountains | Ethiopia | 06°49′36″N 39°49′09″E | Ras Dashen | |
| 17 | Mount Elgon | 4,321 | 14,177 | 2,458 | 8,064 | Mount Elgon | Uganda | 01°07′06″N 34°31′35″E | Kenya | 1911 |
| 18 | Amba Farit | 4,270 | 14,010 | 2,061 | 6,762 | Kollo Massif | Ethiopia | 10°57′02″N 39°06′16″E | Bwahit | |
| 19 | Abune Yosef / Guliba Amba | 4,260 | 13,980 | 1,909 | 6,263 | Lasta Massif | Ethiopia | 12°08′28″N 39°11′01″E | Ras Dashen | |
| 20 | Bada | 4,195 | 13,763 | 1,605 | 5,266 | Arsi Mountains | Ethiopia | 07°54′34″N 39°23′35″E | Tullu Demtu | |
| 21 | Kaka / Kecha / Chiqe | 4,193 | 13,757 | 1,215 | 3,986 | Arsi Mountains | Ethiopia | 07°21′50″N 39°09′28″E | Bada | |
| 22 | Jbel Toubkal | 4,167 | 13,671 | 3,755 | 12,320 | Toubkal Atlas | Morocco | 31°03′36″N 07°54′54″W | Stanley | 1923 |
| 23 | Muhavura | 4,127 | 13,540 | 1,530 | 5,020 | Virunga Mountains | Rwanda; Uganda | 01°22′58″S 29°40′40″E | Karisimbi | 1898 |
| 24 | Hey / Hay | 4,125 | 13,533 | 660 | 2,170 | Semien Mountains | Ethiopia | 13°18′58″N 38°27′05″E | Weynobar | |
| 25 | Guna | 4,120 | 13,520 | 1,510 | 4,950 | Guna Massif | Ethiopia | 11°42′26″N 38°14′13″E | Abune Yosef | |
| 26 | Choqa / Choke / Birhan | 4,100 | 13,500 | 2,225 | 7,300 | Choqa Mountains | Ethiopia | 10°42′51″N 37°50′59″E | Bwahit | |
| 27 | Chilalo | 4,071 | 13,356 | 610 | 2,000 | Arsi Mountains | Ethiopia | 07°54′55″N 39°15′44″E | Bada | |
| 28 | Inatye | 4,070 | 13,350 | 500 | 1,600 | Semien Mountains | Ethiopia | 13°15′38″N 38°09′52″E | Bwahit | |
| 29 | Ighil Mgoun | 4,068 | 13,346 | 1,904 | 6,247 | Central High Atlas | Morocco | 31°30′30″N 06°26′38″W | Toubkal | |
| 30 | Mount Cameroon | 4,040 | 13,250 | 3,905 | 12,812 | Cameroon line | Cameroon | 04°13′00″N 09°10′20″E | Stanley | 1861 |
| 31 | Oldoinyo Lesatima | 4,001 | 13,127 | 2,081 | 6,827 | Aberdare Range | Kenya | 00°18′40″S 36°36′58″E | Mt Kenya | |
| 32 | Jebel n'Tarourt / Tifnout / Iferouane | 4,001 | 13,127 | 910 | 2,990 | Toubkal Atlas | Morocco | 31°04′53″N 07°45′52″W | Toubkal | |
| 33 | Muggia | 3,950 | 12,960 | 500 | 1,600 | Lasta Massif | Ethiopia | 12°04′25″N 39°22′41″E | Abune Yosef | |
| 34 | Dubbai | 3,941 | 12,930 | 1,540 | 5,050 | Tigray Mountains | Ethiopia | 12°51′32″N 39°29′52″E | Abune Yosef | |
| 35 | Mount Kinangop | 3,902 | 12,802 | 530 | 1,740 | Aberdare Range | Kenya | 00°37′37″S 36°42′28″E | Lesatima | |
| 36 | Cimbia | 3,900 | 12,800 | 590 | 1,940 | Kollo Massif | Ethiopia | 10°52′27″N 39°16′05″E | Amba Farit | |
| 37 | Ieciuol ? | 3,840 | 12,600 | 560 | 1,840 | Kollo Massif | Ethiopia | 10°53′02″N 39°28′10″E | Cimbia | |
| 38 | Jbel Tignousti | 3,819 | 12,530 | 930 | 3,050 | Central High Atlas | Morocco | 31°29′52″N 06°43′00″W | Mgoun | |
| 39 | Filfo / Encuolo | 3,805 | 12,484 | 770 | 2,530 | Arsi Mountains | Ethiopia | 07°22′08″N 39°21′19″E | Bada | |
| 40 | Kosso Amba | 3,805 | 12,484 | 530 | 1,740 | Lasta Massif | Ethiopia | 11°47′32″N 39°26′14″E | Pt 3950 | |
| 41 | Baylamtu / Gavsigivla | 3,777 | 12,392 | 1,120 | 3,670 | Lasta Massif | Ethiopia | 12°21′10″N 39°03′48″E | Abune Yosef | |
| 42 | Ouaougoulzat | 3,763 | 12,346 | 860 | 2,820 | Central High Atlas | Morocco | 31°39′17″N 06°15′20″W | Irhil MGoun | |
| 43 | Somkaru | 3,760 | 12,340 | 530 | 1,740 | Bale Mountains | Ethiopia | 06°49′25″N 39°16′56″E | Tullu Demtu | |
| 44 | Abieri | 3,750 | 12,300 | 780 | 2,560 | Semien Mountains | Ethiopia | 13°31′25″N 38°21′22″E | Ras Dashen | |
| 45 | Arin Ayachi | 3,757 | 12,326 | 1,416 | 4,646 | East High Atlas | Morocco | 32°28′36″N 04°55′37″W | Ouaougoulzat | |
| 46 | Teide | 3,718 | 12,198 | 3,718 | 12,198 | Tenerife | Spain (Canary Islands) | 28°16′21″N 16°38′32″W | Island high point | 1582 |
| 47 | Visoke / Bisoke | 3,711 | 12,175 | 585 | 1,919 | Virunga Mountains | DR Congo; Rwanda | 01°27′29″S 29°29′07″E | Karisimbi | 1908 |
| 48 | Sarenga | 3,700 | 12,100 | 1,160 | 3,810 | Tigray Mountains | Ethiopia | 12°40′12″N 39°29′45″E | Dubbai | |
| 49 | Woti / Uoti | 3,700 | 12,100 | 1,050 | 3,440 | Eastern Escarpment | Ethiopia | 09°43′36″N 39°43′46″E | Pt 3840 | |
| 50 | Mount Loolmalassin | 3,682 | 12,080 | 2,040 | 6,690 | Crater Highlands | Tanzania | 03°02′56″S 35°49′15″E | Meru | |
| 51 | Biala? | 3,680 | 12,070 | 870 | 2,850 | Lasta Massif | Ethiopia | 12°27′17″N 39°00′12″E | Baylamtu | |
| 52 | Azurki / Azourki | 3,677 | 12,064 | 790 | 2,590 | Central High Atlas | Morocco | 31°44′48″N 06°15′40″W | Ouaougoulzat | |
| 53 | Pt 3645 | 3,645 | 11,959 | 910 | 2,990 | Lasta Massif | Ethiopia | 11°30′02″N 39°32′11″E | Koso Amba | |
| 54 | Sabyinyo | 3,634 | 11,923 | 1,010 | 3,310 | Virunga Mountains | Rwanda; DR Congo; Uganda | 01°23′15″S 29°35′30″E | Karisimbi | 1907 |
| 55 | Mount Gurage / Guraghe | 3,620 | 11,880 | 1,400 | 4,600 | Gurage Mountains | Ethiopia | 08°16′37″N 38°21′55″E | Uoti | |
| 56 | Jbel Igdat | 3,615 | 11,860 | 1,609 | 5,279 | West High Atlas | Morocco | 30°57′39″N 08°25′50″W | Toubkal | 1888 |
| 57 | Jbel n'Anghomar | 3,609 | 11,841 | 1,420 | 4,660 | Central High Atlas | Morocco | 31°20′11″N 06°59′51″W | Ighil MGoun | |
| 58 | Pt 3600 (Kitir?) | 3,600 | 11,800 | 870 | 2,850 | Eastern Escarpment | Ethiopia | 10°38′22″N 39°41′53″E | Uoti | |
| 59 | Pt 3600 | 3,600 | 11,800 | 610 | 2,000 | Lasta Massif | Ethiopia | 11°38′40″N 39°32′52″E | Koso Amba | |
| 60 | Bar Meda high point | 3,580 | 11,750 | 520 | 1,710 | Eastern Escarpment | Ethiopia | 10°22′28″N 39°48′15″E | Pt 3600 (Kitir ?) | |
| 61 | Jbel Erdouz | 3,579 | 11,742 | 690 | 2,260 | West High Atlas | Morocco | 31°02′46″N 08°24′25″W | Igdat | |
| 62 | Mount Gugu | 3,570 | 11,710 | 940 | 3,080 | Mount Gugu | Ethiopia | 08°12′18″N 39°58′00″E | Bada | |
| 63 | Gesh Megal (?) | 3,570 | 11,710 | 520 | 1,710 | Gurage Mountains | Ethiopia | 08°23′16″N 38°23′29″E | Gurage | |
| 64 | Gughe | 3,568 | 11,706 | 2,013 | 6,604 | Balta Mountains | Ethiopia | 06°12′13″N 37°23′21″E | Gurage | |
| 65 | Megezez | 3,565 | 11,696 | 690 | 2,260 | Eastern Escarpment | Ethiopia | 09°17′11″N 39°32′00″E | Uoti | |
| 66 | Jbel Tinergwet | 3,551 | 11,650 | 880 | 2,890 | West High Atlas | Morocco | 30°48′46″N 08°49′41″W | Igdat | |
| 67 | Amba Alagi | 3,550 | 11,650 | 820 | 2,690 | Tigray Mountains | Ethiopia | 12°57′44″N 39°34′13″E | Dubbai | |
| 68 | Chemnirot (Kamelogon Pk) | 3,530 | 11,580 | 1,510 | 4,950 | Cherangani Hills | Kenya | 01°16′10″N 35°29′50″E | Elgon | |
| 69 | Gara Guda/Kara Gada | 3,530 | 11,580 | 900 | 3,000 | Salale Mountains | Ethiopia | 09°48′31″N 38°38′09″E | Megezez | |
| 70 | Amonewas | 3,530 | 11,580 | 870 | 2,850 | Choqa Mountains | Ethiopia | 10°58′13″N 38°15′46″E | Choke | |
| 71 | Amedamit | 3,530 | 11,580 | 760 | 2,490 | Choqa Mountains | Ethiopia | 11°07′29″N 37°21′23″E | Choke | |
| 72 | Igoudamene | 3,519 | 11,545 | 550 | 1,800 | Central High Atlas | Morocco | 31°35′08″N 06°25′47″W | Mgoun | |
| 73 | Thabana Ntlenyana | 3,482 | 11,424 | 2,390 | 7,840 | Drakensberg | Lesotho | 29°27′46″S 29°15′59″E | | |
| 74 | Mont Mohi | 3,480 | 11,420 | 1,592 | 5,223 | Mitumba Mountains | DR Congo | 02°57′12″S 28°47′04″E | Karisimbi | |
| 75 | Nyiragongo | 3,470 | 11,380 | 1,440 | 4,720 | Virunga Mountains | DR Congo | 01°31′04″S 29°15′13″E | Karisimbi | 1894 |
| 76 | Mount Hanang | 3,420 | 11,220 | 2,050 | 6,730 | Crater Highlands | Tanzania | 04°26′6″S 35°24′0″E | Hanang | |

== Sources ==
- Jamish Brown, Climbing in the Atlas Mountains, The Alpine Journal, 2002, pp. 81–91.
- Des Clark, Mountaineering in the Moroccan High Atlas, Cicerone, 2011
- Bernhard Lindahl, Local History of Ethiopia, 2005/2008 (for verification of names)
- Lists and/or maps covering all peaks in the world with 1500 m+ prominence at Peaklist.org
- "Africa Range3 High Points". Peakbagger.com.
- "Africa 4000-meter Peaks". Peakbagger.com. (an unverified list)
