= Huruta =

- Location within Ethiopia
- Coordinates: 08°09′N 39°21′E
- Country: Ethiopia
- Region: Oromia
- Zone: Arsi
- Woreda: Lude Hitosa
- Elevation: 1,978 m (6,490 ft)

Population (2005)
  - Total: 16,922
- Time zone: UTC+3 ( EAT)

Huruta is a town in central Ethiopia. Located in the Arsi Zone of the Oromia Region to the north of Iteya, it has a latitude and longitude of 8°09′N 39°21′E with an elevation of 1,978 meters.

== History ==
Huruta was the administrative center of the former woreda of Dodota, which included the town of Dera in the neighboring woreda of Dodotana Sire. A water reservoir was built near Huruta in 1983, with a capacity of 100 cubic meters. This project included a six-inch plastic water pipe line 21 kilometers long connected this reservoir to Dera.

There are a number of projects carried out in the town of Huruta. In Spring 2006, a project called Self Help Hurut's Project was established with funding support provided by the charitable foundation of the Irish Agricultural Wholesale Society. The project objective is to increase agricultural production and productivity, increase farm household incomes, improve access to social services, and restore the natural resource base of the district.

== Demographics ==
Based on figures from the Central Statistical Agency of Ethiopia published in 2005, Huruta has an estimated total population of 16,922 consisting of 8,391 men and 8,531 women. The 1994 national census reported this town had a total population of 9,465 of whom 4,551 were males and 4,914 were females. It is the main town of Lude Hitosa woreda.
