= Digeluna Tijo =

District in Oromia Region, Ethiopia

Coordinates: 7°20′N 39°15′E

Digeluna Tijo is a woreda in Oromia Region, Ethiopia. Part of the Arsi Zone, Digeluna Tijo is bordered on the south by Bekoji, on the southwest by Munesa, on the northwest by Tiyo, on the north by Hitosa, on the northeast by Tena, and on the east by Sherka. The administrative center of this woreda is Sagure; other towns include Digelu and Tijo. Digaluna Tijo has 26 kebeles: Digalu Arrabi, Mankula Nagele, Tijo 01, Digalu 01, Tite Wajji, Mankula Nagale, Bura Jalle, Shaldo Jigesa, Qubsa Bora, Digalu Bora, Sagure 01, Sagure 02, Jamo, and Qago Ashabaka

== Overview ==
The altitude of this woreda ranges from 2500 to 3560 meters above sea level; Mount Boraluku is the highest point. Rivers include the Katar, Ashebeka and Gusha. A survey of the land in this woreda shows that 39.5% is arable or cultivable, 27.4% pasture, 13.3% forest, and the remaining 19.8% is considered swampy, mountainous or otherwise unusable. Linseed is an important cash crop.

Industry in the woreda includes 35 grain mills and 6 edible oil mills employing 96 people, as well as 475 registered businesses, which include 181 wholesalers, 182 retailers and 112 service providers. There were 22 Farmers Associations with 14,096 members and 6 Farmers Service Cooperatives with 11,058 members. Digeluna Tijo has 66 kilometers of dry-weather and 32 of all-weather road, for an average road density of 110.2 kilometers per 1000 square kilometers. About 33.3% of the urban and 11.2% of the rural population has access to drinking water.

== Demographics ==
The 2007 national census reported a total population for this woreda of 140,466, of whom 69,503 were men and 70,963 were women; 14,080 or 10.02% of its population were urban dwellers. The majority of the inhabitants said they were Muslim, with 50.27% of the population reporting they observed this belief, while 47.63% of the population practised Ethiopian Orthodox Christianity, and 1.91% of the population were Protestant.

Based on figures published by the Central Statistical Agency in 2005, this woreda has an estimated total population of 146,219, of whom 74,755 are men and 71,464 are women; 13,631 or 9.32% of its population are urban dwellers, which is less than the Zone average of 12.3%. With an estimated area of 889.22 square kilometers, Digeluna Tijo has an estimated population density of 164.4 people per square kilometer, which is greater than the Zone average of 132.2.

The 1994 national census reported a total population for this woreda of 104,136, of whom 51,153 were men and 52,983 women; 7,640 or 7.34% of its population were urban dwellers at the time. The two largest ethnic groups reported in Digeluna Tijo were Oromo (92.52%), and Amhara (6.78%); all other ethnic groups made up 0.7% of the population. Oromiffa was spoken as a first language by 92.08%, and 7.72% spoke Amharic; the remaining 0.2% spoke all other primary languages reported. The majority of the inhabitants professed Ethiopian Orthodox Christianity, with 51.69% of the population having reported they practiced that belief, while 47.63% of the population said they were Muslim.

According to a survey published by the Chilalo Agricultural Development Union in 1969, Digeluna Tijo had a population of 40,779 at the time, with 11,571 households farming 44,960 hectares of land.
