= Bekoji (woreda) =

District in Oromia Region, Ethiopia

Coordinates: 7°20′N 39°30′E

Bekoji (Oromo: Boqojji) was a woreda in Oromia Region, Ethiopia. Part of the Arsi Zone, Bekoji was bordered on the south by Gedeb, on the southwest by Kofele, on the west by Munesa, on the north by Digeluna Tijo, on the east by Sherka, and on the southeast by the Shebelle River which separated it from the Bale Zone. The administrative center of this woreda was Bekoji; other towns included Lemu Sirba, Meraro, Siltana and Sirbo. Bekoji was divided for Enkelo Wabe and Limuna Bilbilo woredas.

== Demographics ==
Based on figures published by the Central Statistical Agency in 2005, this district has an estimated total population of 234,741, of whom 119,275 are men and 115,466 are women; 30,137 or 12.84% of its population are urban dwellers, which is greater than the Zone average of 12.3%. With an estimated area of 1,501.72 square kilometers, Bekoji has an estimated population density of 156.3 people per square kilometer, which is greater than the Zone average of 132.2.

The 1994 national census reported a total population for this district of 165,788, of whom 81,849 were men and 83,939 women; 16,876 or 10.18% of its population were urban dwellers at the time. The two largest ethnic groups reported in Bekoji were the Oromo (87.55%), and the Amhara (11.75%); all other ethnic groups made up 0.7% of the population. Oromo was spoken as a first language by 87.23%, and 12.57% spoke Amharic; the remaining 0.2% spoke all other primary languages reported. The majority of the inhabitants professed Ethiopian Orthodox Christianity, with 58.91% of the population having reported they practiced that belief, while 39.96% of the population said they were Muslim, and 1% were Protestant.
