= Gonde, Ethiopia =

Town in Oromia Region, Ethiopia

Gonde Gondee (Oromo)
- Town
- Location within Ethiopia
- Coordinates: 08°03′N 39°18′E
- Country: Ethiopia
- Region: Oromia
- Zone: Arsi
- Woreda: Tiyo
- Elevation: 2,295 m (7,530 ft)

Population (2005)
  - Total: 3,965
- Time zone: UTC+3 ( EAT)

Gonde is a town in central Ethiopia. Located in the Arsi Zone of the Oromia Region to the south of Asella, on the river of the Gonde River (which is a tributary of the Kater), the town has a latitude and longitude of 8°03′N 39°18′E with an elevation of 2,295 meters.

Based on figures from the Central Statistical Agency of Ethiopia published in 2005, Gonde has an estimated total population of 3,965 consisting of 1,842 men and 2,123 women. The 1994 census reported this town had a total population of 2,222 of whom 999 were males and 1,223 females. It is one of two towns in Tiyo woreda.

Records at the Nordic Africa Institute website provide details of a primary school in Gonde during the year 1968.
