= Tena (woreda) =

District in Oromia Region, Ethiopia

Coordinates: 7°45′N 39°25′E

Tena is a woreda in Oromia Region, Ethiopia. Diksis woreda was separated form Tena woreda. Part of the Arsi Zone, Tena is bordered on the south by Sherka, on the southwest by Bekoji, on the west by Digeluna Tijo, on the northwest by Hitosa, on the north by Dodotana Sire, on the northeast by Sude, and on the east by Robe. The administrative center of the woreda is Ticho; other towns in Tena include Kela.

== Overview ==
The altitude of this woreda ranges from 1800 to over 4100 meters above sea level; the highest point in this woreda is Mount Bada (4195 meters). Rivers include 66 kilometers of the Demasho, 13 of the Hararghe and 15 of the Walkesa. A survey of the land in this woreda shows that 34.4% is arable or cultivable, 7% pasture, 10.2% forest, and the remaining 48.4% is considered swampy, mountainous or otherwise unusable. Onions, pepper and sugar cane are important cash crops. Although Coffee is also an important cash crop, less than 20 square kilometers are planted with it.

Industry in the woreda includes 30 grain mills employing 77 people, as well as 705 registered businesses, of which 26.9% were wholesalers, 53.1% retailers and 20.4% service providers. There were 21 Farmers Associations with 12,220 members and 7 Farmers Service Cooperatives with an unknown number of members. Tena has 25 kilometers of dry-weather and 33 of all-weather road, for an average road density of 74.1 kilometers per 1000 square kilometers. About 11.4% of the total population has access to drinking water.

== Demographics ==
The 2007 national census reported a total population for this woreda of 66,203, of whom 33,231 were men and 32,972 were women; 6,252 or 9.44% of its population were urban dwellers. The majority of the inhabitants said they were Muslim, with 54.33% of the population reporting they observed this belief, while 44.18% of the population practised Ethiopian Orthodox Christianity.

Based on figures published by the Central Statistical Agency in 2005, this woreda has an estimated total population of 129,191, of whom 65,009 were males and 64,182 were females; 10,500 or 8.13% of its population are urban dwellers, which is less than the Zone average of 12.3%. With an estimated area of 783.44 square kilometers, Tena has an estimated population density of 164.9 people per square kilometer, which is greater than the Zone average of 132.2.

The 1994 national census reported a total population for this woreda of 91,418, of whom 45,601 were men and 45,817 women; 8,721 or 9.54% of its population were urban dwellers at the time. The two largest ethnic groups reported in Tena were Oromo (83.06%), and Amhara (15.91%); all other ethnic groups made up 1.03% of the population. Oromiffa was spoken as a first language by 78.26%, and 21.61% spoke Amharic; the remaining 0.13% spoke all other primary languages reported. The majority of the inhabitants were Muslim, with 54.62% of the population having reported they practiced that belief, while 44.99% of the population said they professed Ethiopian Orthodox Christianity.
