= Digelu =

- Location within Ethiopia
- Coordinates: 07°45′N 39°15′E
- Country: Ethiopia
- Region: Oromia
- Zone: Arsi
- Woreda: Digeluna Tijo
- Elevation: 2,713 m (8,901 ft)

Population (2005)
  - Total: 1,643
- Time zone: UTC+3 ( EAT)

Digelu (also known as Kidame Digelu) is a town in central Ethiopia. Located in the Arsi Zone of the Oromia Region to the east of Sagure, it has a latitude and longitude of 7°45′N 39°15′E with an elevation of 2,713 meters (8,901 ft). It is one of three settlements in Digeluna Tijo woreda.

A survey of Digelu made in 1970 portrayed the town sitting in a forested area where tree felling had just started. Inhabitants were about three times as many Shewa Oromo as Arsi Oromo. Landowners averaged about 15 hectares (37 acres) and tenants about 4 hectares (10 acres) on an average.

Based on figures from the Central Statistical Agency of Ethiopia published in 2005, Digelu has an estimated total population of 1,623 consisting of 738 men and 885 women. The 1994 census reported this town had a total population of 910 of whom 400 were males and 510 females.
