= Tiyo (woreda) =

District in Oromia Region, Ethiopia

Coordinates: 7°50′N 39°10′E

Tiyo Tiyyoo (Oromo)
- Woreda
- Location within Ethiopia
- Country: Ethiopia
- Region: (Oromia Region) Oromia
- Zone: Arsi
- Time zone: UTC+3 (EAT)

Tiyo is a woreda in Oromia Region, Ethiopia. Part of the Arsi Zone, Tiyo is bordered on the south by Munesa, on the west by Batu Dugda, on the northeast by Hitosa, and on the southeast by Digeluna Tijo. The administrative center of the woreda and Zone is Asella; other towns in Tiyo include Gonde.

== Overview ==
Mount Chilalo is the highest point in this woreda. Rivers include the Katar, Kulmsa, Gonde, Dosha and Walkesa. A survey of the land in this woreda shows that 40% is arable or cultivable (32% was planted with cereals), 23.1% pasture, 8.7% forest, and the remaining 28.2% is considered swampy, mountainous or otherwise unusable.

Industry in the woreda includes the Asella Malt factory, 55 small industries including 39 grain mills employing 240 people, as well as 2023 registered businesses of which 21.7% were wholesalers, 53% retailers, and 25.3% service providers. There were 15 Farmers Associations with 13,704 members and 9 Farmers Service Cooperatives with 426 members. Tiyo has 16 kilometers of dry-weather and 46.5 of all-weather road, for an average road density of 98 kilometers per 1000 square kilometers. About 53.7% of the total population has access to drinking water.

== Demographics ==
The 2007 national census reported a total population for this woreda of 86,761, of whom 43,463 were men and 43,298 were women; 6,525 or 7.52% of its population were urban dwellers. The majority of the inhabitants said they practised Ethiopian Orthodox Christianity, with 58.5% of the population reporting they observed this belief, while 40.24% of the population were Muslim, and 1.05% of the population were Protestant.

Based on figures published by the Central Statistical Agency in 2005, this woreda has an estimated total population of 182,193, of whom 93,369 are men and 88,824 are women; 91,775 or 50.37% of its population are urban dwellers, which is greater than the Zone average of 12.3%. With an estimated area of 638.44 square kilometers, Tiyo has an estimated population density of 285.4 people per square kilometer, which is greater than the Zone average of 132.2.

The 1994 national census reported a total population for this woreda of 117,197, of whom 56,725 were men and 60,472 women; 51,387 or 43.85% of its population were urban dwellers at the time. The five largest ethnic groups reported in Tiyo were Oromo (53.92%), Amhara (37.63%), Soddo Gurage (3.41%), Silt'e (1.73%), and Sebat Bet Gurage (1.07%); all other ethnic groups made up 2.24% of the population. Amharic was spoken as a first language by 51.2%, 45.51% spoke Oromiffa, 1.06% Soddo and 0.88% spoke Silt'e; the remaining 1.35% spoke all other primary languages reported. The majority of the inhabitants professed Ethiopian Orthodox Christianity, with 71.06% of the population having reported they practiced that belief, while 27.02% of the population said they were Muslim, and 1.61% were Protestant.
