= Batu Dugda =

District in Oromia Region, Ethiopia

Coordinates: 8°00′N 39°00′E

Zuwaay Dugda'aa Zuwaay Dugda'aa (Oromo)
- Woreda
- Location within Ethiopia
- Country: Ethiopia
- Region: (Oromia Region) Oromia
- Zone: Arsi
- Time zone: UTC+3 (EAT)

Batu Dugda is a woreda in Oromia Region, Ethiopia. Part of the Arsi Zone located in the Great Rift Valley, Batu Dugda is bordered on the south by Munesa, on the west and north by the East Shewa Zone, on the east by Hitosa, and on the southeast by Tiyo; also on its western edge is Hora-Dambal, whose area this woreda shares with the East Shewa Zone. The administrative center for this woreda is Ogolcho; other settlements include Chefe Jile, Areta Chufa, Hula Arba and Natile.

== Overview ==
The altitude of this woreda ranges from 1500 to 2300 meters above sea level. The only river in this district is the 30 kilometers of the Katar. A survey of the land in this woreda shows that 31.7% is arable or cultivable, 6% pasture, 46.3% forest, and the remaining 16% is considered swampy, mountainous or otherwise unusable. The Habura and Sango caves are local landmarks. Haricot bean, sugar cane and papaya are important cash crops.

Industry in the woreda includes 14 grain mills employing 35 people, as well as 330 registered merchants of whom 14.5% are wholesalers 33.3% retailers and 52.2% service providers. There were 31 Farmers Associations with 11,203 members. Ziway Dugda has 220 kilometers of dry-weather and 37 all-weather road, for an average of road density of 202.5 kilometers per 1000 square kilometers. About 25.5% of the total population has access to drinking water.

== Demographics ==
The 2007 national census reported a total population for this woreda of 120,862, of whom 60,379 were men and 60,483 were women; 4,506 or 3.73% of its population were urban dwellers. The majority of the inhabitants said they were Muslim, with 91.04% of the population reporting they observed this belief, while 7.82% of the population practised Ethiopian Orthodox Christianity.

Based on figures published by the Central Statistical Agency in 2005, this woreda has an estimated total population of 120,121, of whom 60,700 are men and 59,421 are women; 4,338 or 3.61% of its population are urban dwellers, which is less than the Zone average of 12.3%. With an estimated area of 1,269.07 square kilometers, Ziway Dugda has an estimated population density of 94.7 people per square kilometer, which is less than the Zone average of 132.2.

The 1994 national census reported a total population for this woreda of 86,691, of whom 43,103 were men and 43,588 women; 2,424 or 2.8% of its population were urban dwellers at the time. The two largest ethnic groups reported in Ziway Dugda were Oromo (94.84%), and Amhara (1.43%); all other ethnic groups made up 3.73% of the population. Oromiffa was spoken as a first language by 94.35%, and 2.47% spoke Amharic; the remaining 3.18% spoke all other primary languages reported. The majority of the inhabitants were Muslim, with 89.56% of the population having reported they practiced that belief, while 10.17% of the population said they professed Ethiopian Orthodox Christianity.
