= Tijo =

Tijo ጢጆ
- Town
- Location within Ethiopia
- Coordinates: 07°47′N 39°09′E
- Country: Ethiopia
- Region: Oromia
- Zone: Arsi
- Woreda: Digeluna Tijo
- Elevation: 2,405 m (7,890 ft)

Population (2005)
  - Total: 2,048
- Time zone: UTC+3 ( EAT)

Tijo (Amharic: ጢጆ) is a town in central Ethiopia. Located in the Arsi Zone of the Oromia Region about 25 kilometers east of Sagure, it has a latitude and longitude of 7°47′N 39°9′E with an elevation of 2,405 meters. It is one of three settlements in Digeluna Tijo woreda.

== History ==
The grave of a contemporary Imam Ahmad ibn Ibrahim named Ashab 'Utman, who tradition says was an important missionary of Islam in what became the Arsi Zone, lies near Tijo. He is said to have been killed by the Ogaden warrior Atalibo and was then cursed for this deed by Imam Ahmad's successor Emir Nur ibn Mujahid. The Hadiya clans Dooda, Weege, and Malge claim him as their ancestor. Ashab 'Utman's cupola-shaped tomb, which Braukämper states "was presumably erected in the 1880s", over the following decades became an important focus of local Muslim attention.

Tijo served as the administrative center for Arsiland during the Italian occupation.

Records at the Nordic Africa Institute website provide details of a primary school in Tijo during the year 1968. Tijo is composed of several small villages which include Bura Jallee, Wajiifi Titte, Digeluu, Naannawa, and Kallaa.

== Demographics ==
Based on figures from the Central Statistical Agency of Ethiopia published in 2005, Tijo has an estimated total population of 2,048, of whom 946 are men and 1,102 women. The 1994 national census reported this town had a total population of 1,148 of whom 513 were men and 635 were women.
