= Kersa =

Kersa is the name of several places in Ethiopia:

- Kersa, Jimma, a woreda in the Jimma Zone
- Karsa River (also spelled "Kersa"), in western Ethiopia
- Kersa, Arsi, a town in the Arsi Zone
- Kersa, Hararge, a woreda in the Hararge Zone
