= Meshaha River =

River in the Simien Mountains, Ethiopia

Coordinates: 12°56′51″N 38°34′39″E

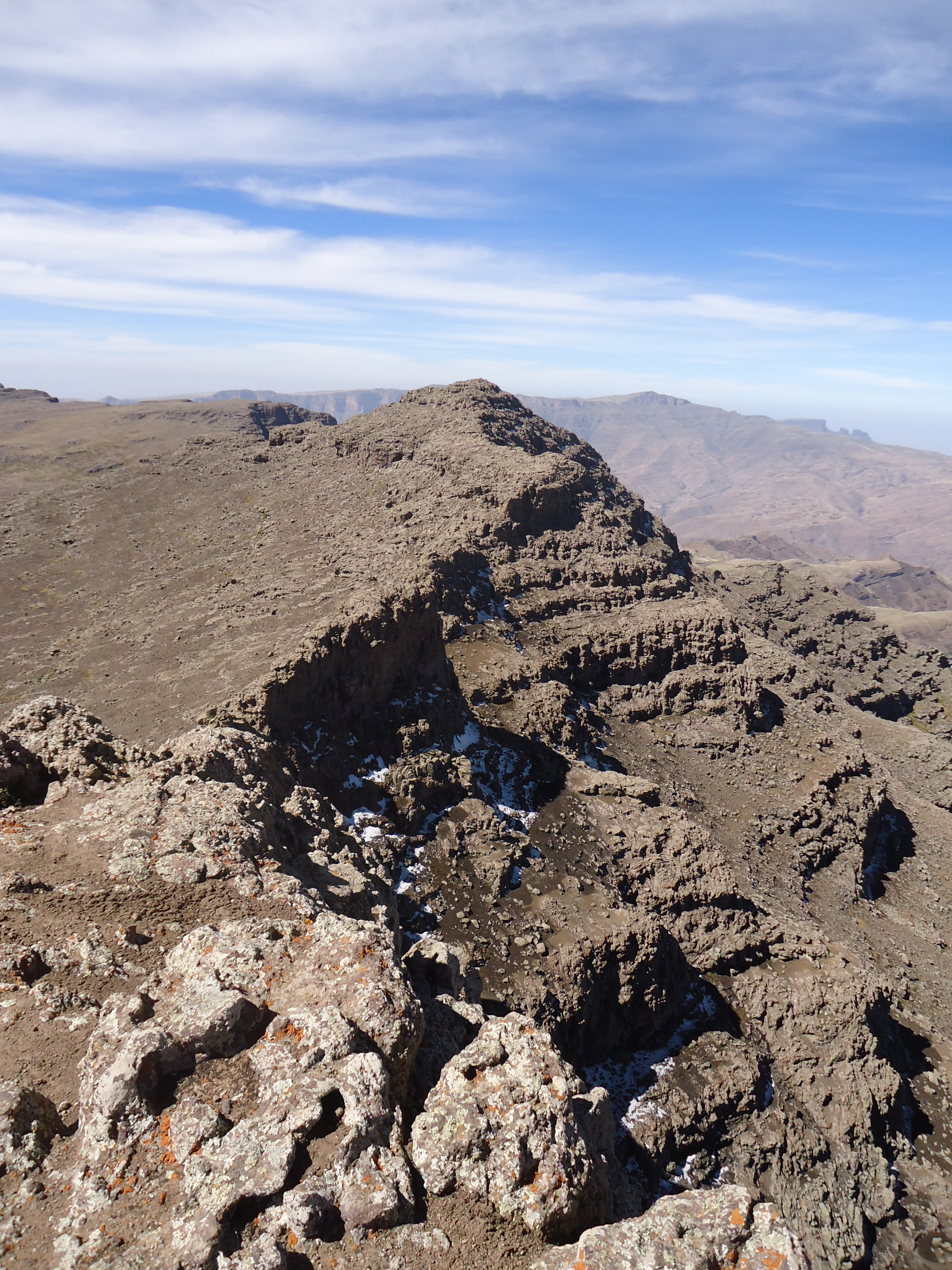
- West peak, with frost

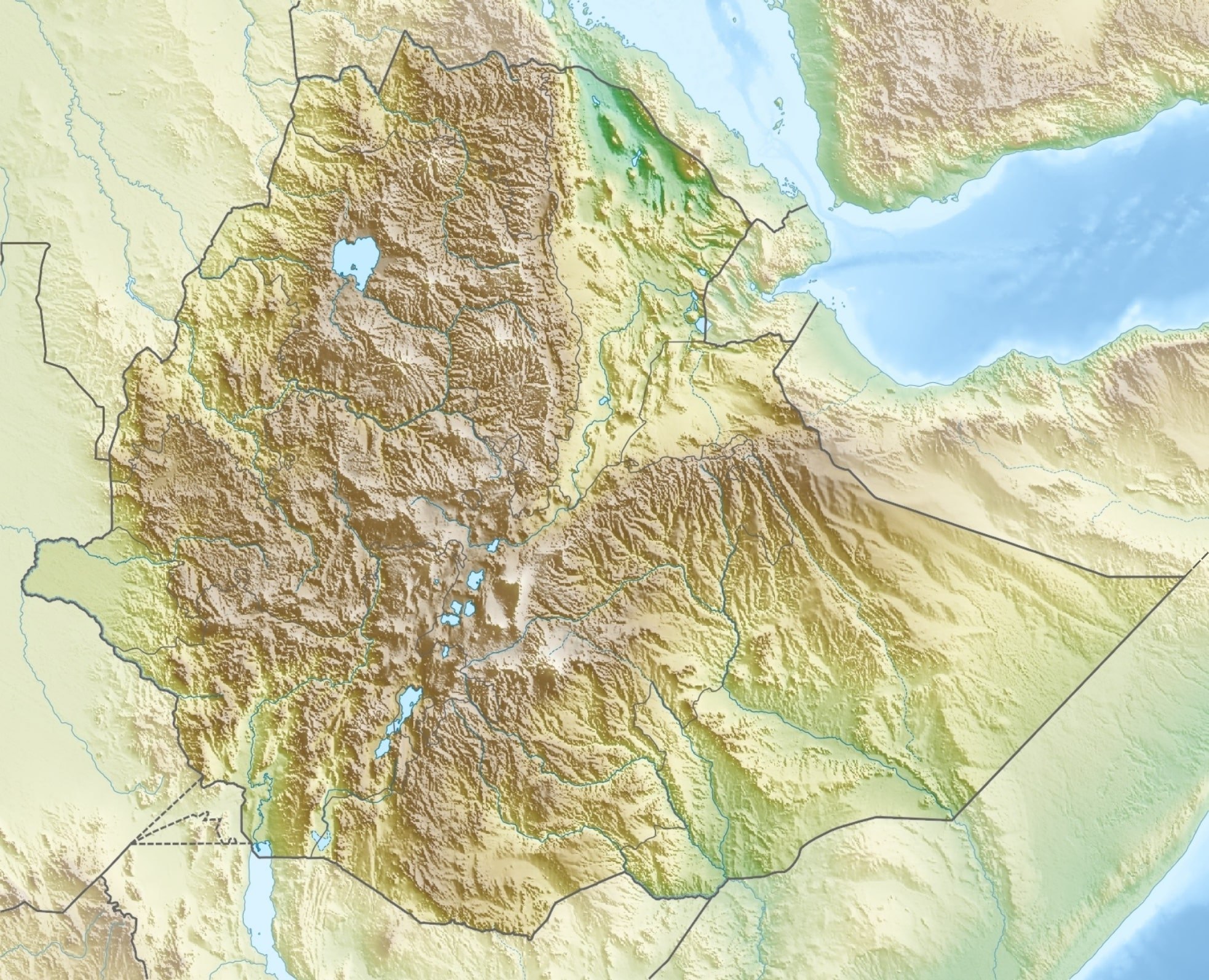
- The Meshaha River is in the north-northwest, near Gondar.

Location
- Country: Ethiopia
- Province: Gondar

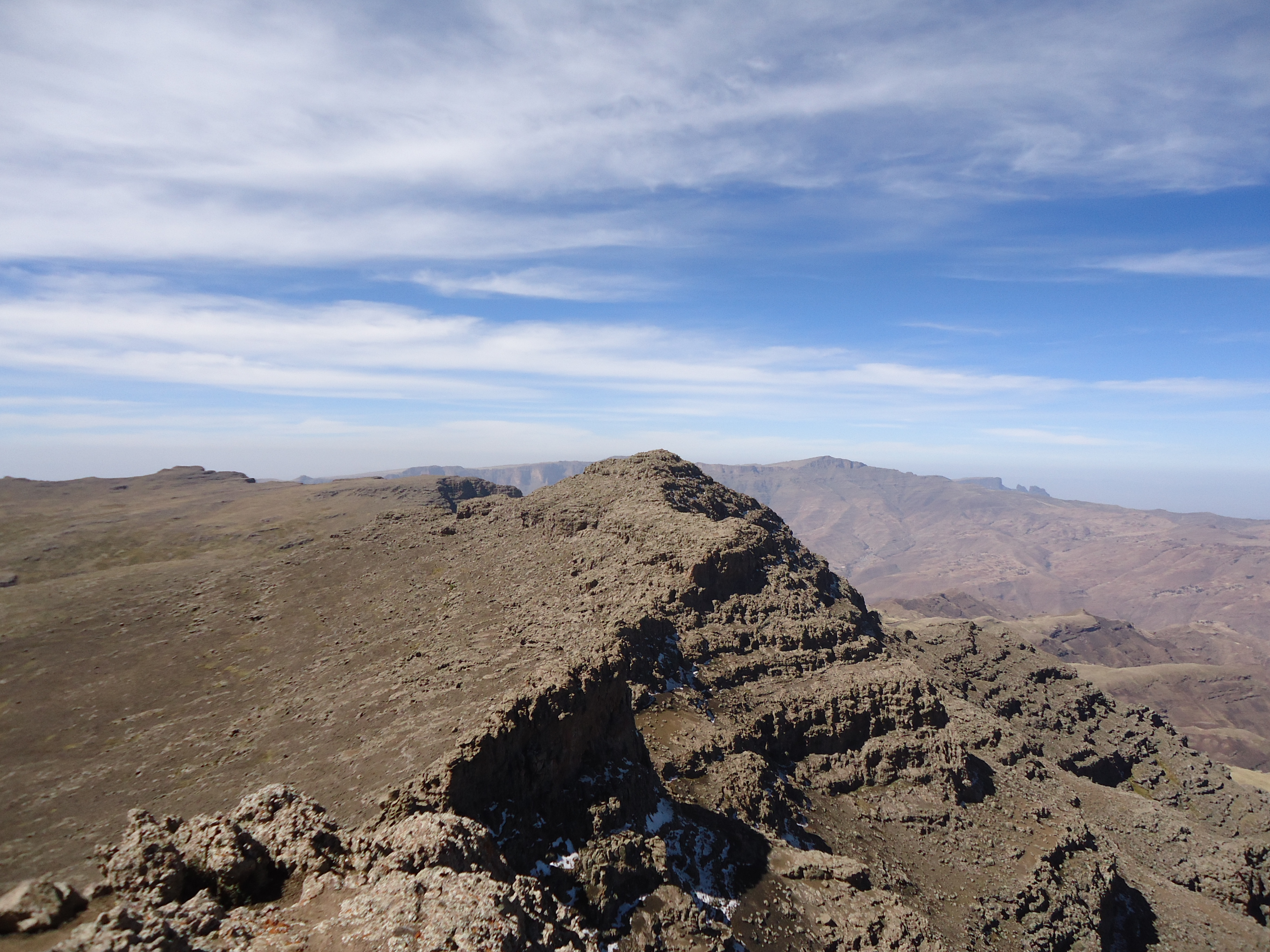
View of Bwahit Mountain from Ras Dejen, with the Meshaha Valley also visible. Same image as in infobox but taken in the warm season.

The Meshaha or Mesheha River is a relatively short minor tributary river of the Tekeze that rises in and runs through the Simien Mountains in Gondar province, Amhara, northwestern Ethiopia. It is situated near Ras Dejen, Ethiopia's highest peak, in a valley that is relatively hot and dry compared to the lands above. It is part of a system of westerly ravines relative to Ras Dejen; therefore it drains into the Tekeze River (they all do). At approximately 2,800 metres (9,200 ft) of elevation, it is far below the mountains and plateaus surrounding it and below the treeline [at 3,700 metres (12,100 ft) in the Simien Mountains]. The river is extremely active and fast-flowing during the rainy season (mid-June to mid-September).

Three villages, Ambikwa, Chiro Leba and Mizma, exist on the slopes of the river valley. A trail winds through it from Bwahit Pass to Dejen Pass.

== History and geology ==
The river valley is very eroded, steep, and deep, as the Simien Mountains are the result of a dramatic uplifting after a violent volcanic eruption in the area and their landscapes are very eroded and varied in terms of elevation, as is the river valley. As a result, the river was likely created with the massif in the Oligocene and eroded the valley over time after its creation.

The river is within Simien Mountains National Park, which has been a park since 1969 along with Awash National Park, the only two parks in the country until 2006.

== Geography ==
=== Course ===
The Meshaha River rises in the high Simien Mountains, approximately 500 miles (800 km) north-northwest of Addis Ababa and 200 miles (320 km) northeast of Lake Tana, and flows through its namesake ravine between Ras Dejen and Bwahit Mountain, eventually draining into the Tekeze farther west.

=== Climate ===
The area around the Meshaha River and Ras Dejen (not the summit, around 2,000 m) has a BSh (hot semi-desert) climate, bordering on a Cwa (hot-summer subtropical highland) and a Cwb (the warm-summer variant), with mild to warm, rainy summers and warm to hot, extremely arid winters. The average lowest temperature to be observed in a year is 48 °F (9 °C), and the average highest is 88 °F (31 °C), giving an amplitude of 40 F (22 C).

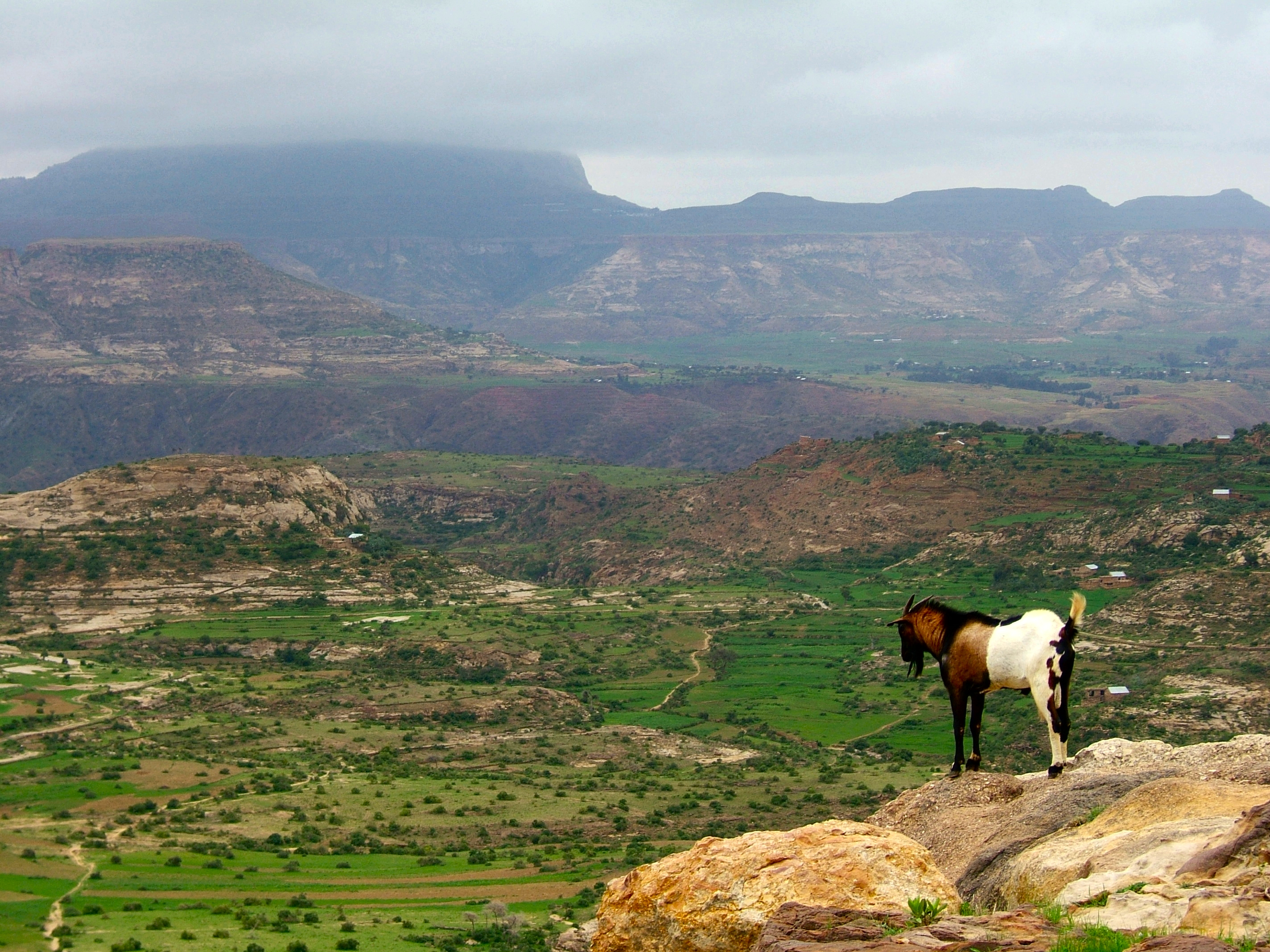
An ibex looking into Ras Dejen (top left, cloud-covered) from a valley with sub-alpine vegetation. Ibexes are endemic to Ethiopia.

=== Flora and fauna ===
The river, being in a semi-desert area, has some arid-climate plants on and just above its banks, such as Euphorbias. Slightly higher up, the land below the treeline, on the banks of the river and higher op on the slopes of the ravine, is farmland with scattered bushes and small trees, grading to alpine tundra above 3,700 meters closer to the summits of both mountains. The highest areas, above ~4,050 metres (13,290 ft) are mostly rock and frost, without substantial vegetation of any kind, but they do not have an ice cap climate (EF).

Rare animals that are endemic to the Ethiopian Highlands exist at this river and the cliffs around it, such as Walia ibexes, Ethiopian wolves, bearded vultures, and Gelada baboons (famously known as "bleeding heart baboons).

== Gallery ==
In all pictures that have been taken from above, the elephant-trunk-shaped formation is the Meshaha valley.

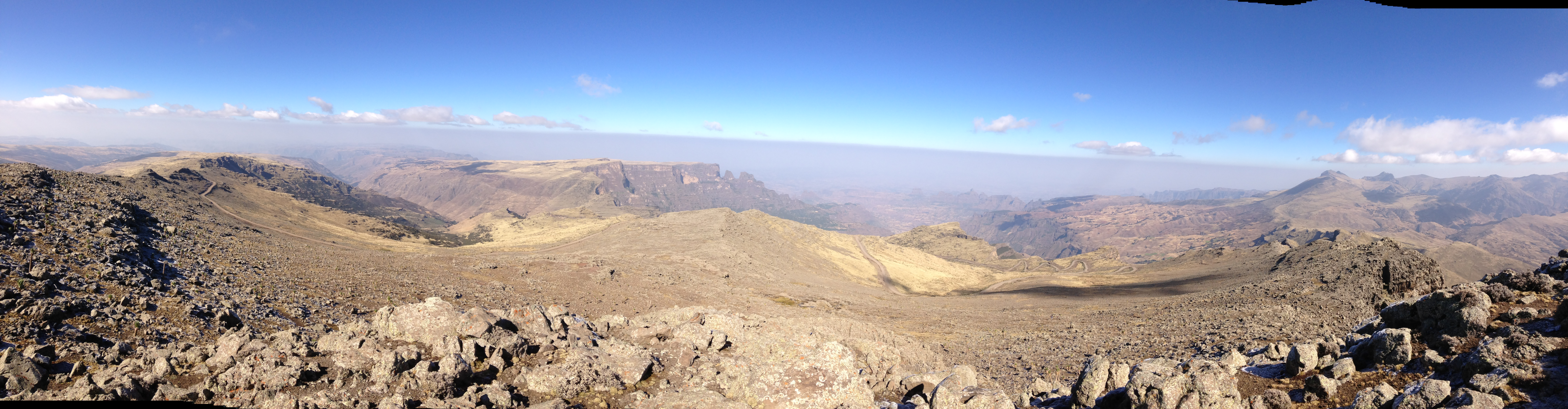
Meshaha Valley seen from Bwahit

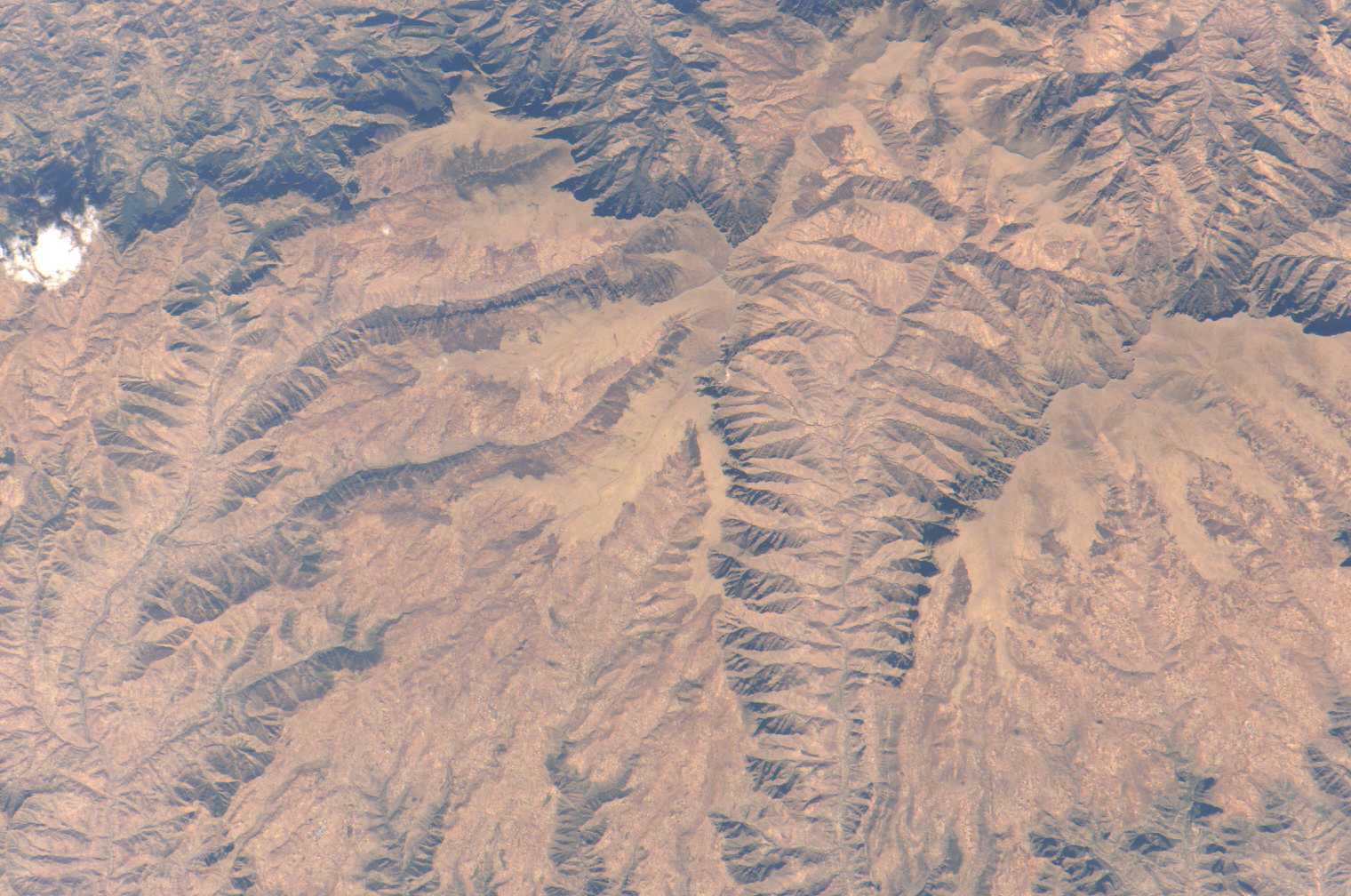
Meshaha Valley visible from above In all from-above pics, the elephant-trunk shaped formation is the Meshaha Valley

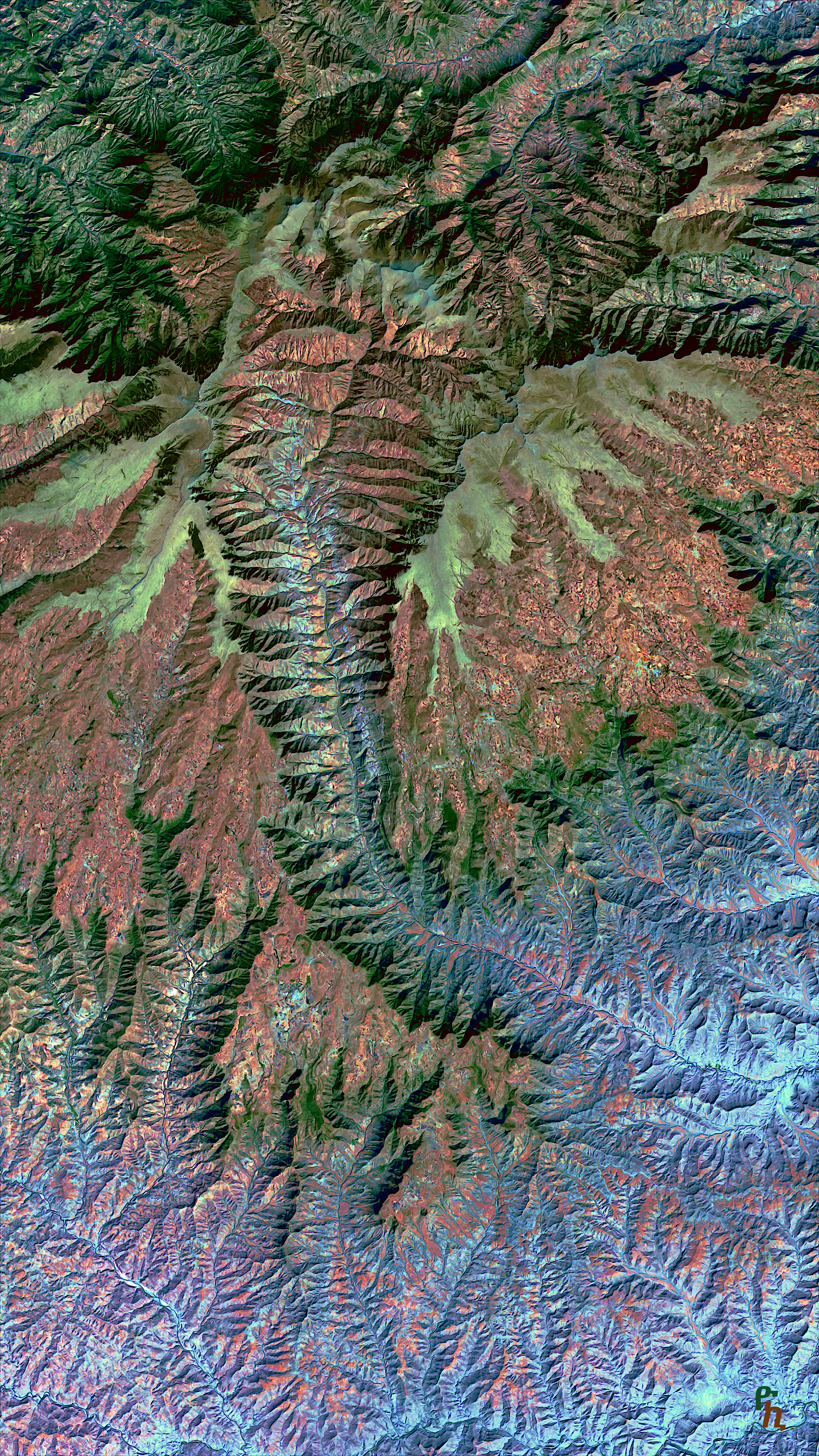
Ras Dejen and the Meshaha Valley in false color

View of Ras Dejen and Meshaha Valley from above
