= Battle of Dodota =

1883 battle in present-day Arsi, Ethiopia

- Part of Menelik's Expansions
Date	December 1883
Location	Dodota, Arsi Province, Ethiopia
Result	Arsi victory

Belligerents
(Ethiopian Empire) Shewa: Supported by: France (arms); United Kingdom (arms)	Arsi Oromo

Commanders and leaders
Negus Menelik II	Leenjiso Diga Jatene Bultum (WIA)

Casualties and losses
Heavy	Minimal

The Battle of Dodota, also known as the Battle of Doddota, was a military engagement fought in December 1883 between a force of Arsi Oromo led by Leenjiso Diga and Jatene Bultum and a Shewan force led by Negus (King) Menelik II. This was during Negus Menelik II's second campaign against the Arsi.

== Prelude ==
During the December 1883 Arsi campaign, Menelik II had invaded with the goal of annexing the Arsi territory. Karim ElAmin states that from the very beginning of their entry into Arussiland the Shawan troops were met with a stubborn resistance from Arussi fighters led by Gosa Dillamo. Academic sources agree that after Menelik and the Arsi cavalry fought at the Qalata River. After the battle, Menelik camped in Arussi for a few days. During the campaigns, Menelik II's Shewan forces held a significant technological advantage, utilizing modern firearms like guns and munitions procured through trade with [[French Third Republic|French]] also with [[British Empire|British]] arms merchants, alongside guidance from European advisors.<ref>Mohammed Hassen (2015). ''The Oromo and the Christian Kingdom of Ethiopia: 1300–1700''. James Currey.</ref><ref>Gnamo, Abbas (2014). ''Conquest and Resistance in the Ethiopian Empire, 1880–1974: The Case of the Arsi Oromo''. BRILL, p. 150.</ref> In contrast, the Arsi forces relied primarily on traditional cavalry, spears, and shield tactics organized under their [[Gadaa]] military tradition.<ref>ElAmin, Karim (2009). ''An Historical Study of the Shawan-Amhara Conquest of the Oromo and Sidama Regions of Southern Ethiopia 1865-1900''. University of Khartoum, p. 148.</ref>

== Battle ==
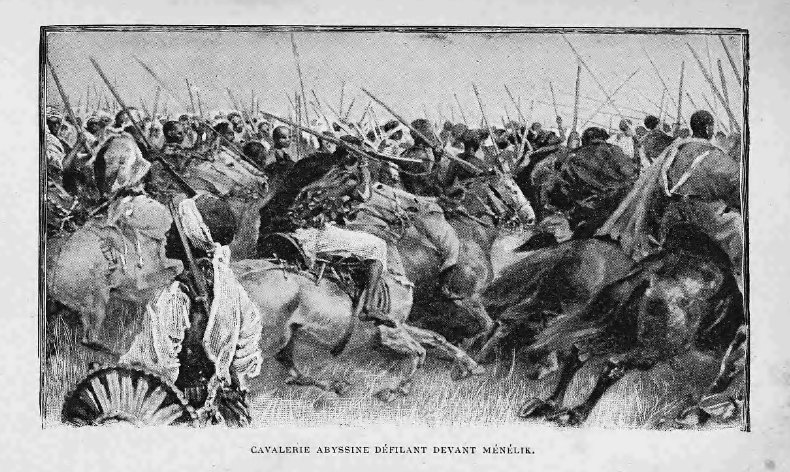
Abyssinian cavalry parading before Menelik

As Negus Menelik II and his army was heading back to Shewa, they encountered Arsi cavalry at a short distance of 20 km to the south of the Awash River. The battle lasted for several hours and the Arsi cavalry defeated the Shewan troops. All sources also agree that Menelik's imperial drum "negarit" was captured during the fighting and many soldiers were killed and Negus Menelik II narrowly escaped death. Abbas Gnamo states Menelik's Shewan army and himself were pursued on horseback from Dodota to Modojo (present day Mojo) back to Shewa. Karim ElAmin says that Menelik himself is said to have managed to escape only because of the speed of his war-horse. According to informants the pursuing Arussi fighters were obliged to turn back because one of their leaders, Jatené Bultum, was wounded by shots fired at him by the Shawan soldiers.

== Aftermath ==
After the battle, the Arsi warriors took the negarit home back to a place called Burqunte (present day Dera, Ethiopia), where the Sabiro clan reside.
