= Enkelo Wabe =

District in Oromia, Ethiopia

Honkolo Wabe is one of the woredas in the Oromia Region of Ethiopia. It is part of the Arsi Zone. It was part of former Bekoji woreda which was divided for and Limuna Bilbilo woredas.

== Demographics ==
The 2007 national census reported a total population for this woreda of 58,561, of whom 29,297 were men and 29,264 were women; 6,802 or 11.62% of its population were urban dwellers. The majority of the inhabitants said they practised Ethiopian Orthodox Christianity, with 62.34% of the population reporting they observed this belief, while 36.84% of the population were Muslim.
