= Assela Wind Power Station =

Wind farm in Oromia, Ethiopia

- Country: Ethiopia
- Location: Iteya, Oromia Region
- Coordinates: 08°05′10″N 39°12′55″E
- Status: Under construction
- Commission date: March 2023 Expected
- Construction cost: €146 million
- Owner: Ethiopian Electric Power

Thermal power station
- Primary fuel: Wind

Power generation
- Nameplate capacity: 100 MW (130,000 hp)

Assela Wind Power Station is a 100 MW (130,000 hp) wind farm, under construction in the Oromia Region of Ethiopia.

== Location ==
The power station is located near the town of Iteya, the capital of Oromia Region, approximately 140 kilometres (87 mi), southeast of Addis Ababa, the nation's capital city.

== Overview ==
The power station is owned by the national electricity utility company, Ethiopian Electric Power (EEP). The station comprises 29 energy-generating wind mills, each rated at 3.45 megawatts capacity, for a total of 100 megawatts at maximum output. The generated energy will be integrated into Ethiopia's national electricity grid, through a substation to be built by the state-owned EEP, with a loan of US$10 million, borrowed from the African Development Bank (AfDB). Assela Wind Power Station's annual energy output will be capable of supplying 300,000 Kilo-Watt-Hours of electricity, enough to power 400,000 Ethiopian homes.

== Construction ==
The Engineering, Procurement and Construction contract was awarded to Siemens Gamesa, the Spanish subsidiary of Siemens, the German conglomerate. Construction is expected to start during the first quarter of 2021 and last about 24 months.

== Funding ==
The power station was funded to the tune of €146 million, sourced from the entities listed in the table below:

Funding Sources For Assela Wind Power Station
Rank	Lender	Loan in Euros	Percentage	Notes
1	Danske Bank	117.3 million		Loan
2	Danida Business Fund via Investment Fund for Developing Countries	28.0 million		Grant
	Total	146.0 million	100.00	

== Ownership ==
The power station is owned by the Government of Ethiopia, through the national electricity utility company, Ethiopian Electric Power.

== Operations ==
During the construction phase and for the first five years of operations, Siemens Gamesa Denmark, the Danish subsidiary, will maintain 60 percent control of the power station, while Siemens Gamesa Spain, the parent, will maintain 40 percent control. The Siemens Gamesa consortium will be responsible for construction, operations, management, maintenance and repairs, during that period.

== See also ==
- List of power stations in Ethiopia
