= Robe, Arsi =

Town located in Oromia state of Ethiopia

Robe, Arsi Roobee Arsii (Oromo)
- Town
- Location within Ethiopia
- Coordinates: 09°36′N 39°08′E
- Country: Ethiopia
- Region: (Oromia Region) Oromia
- Zone: Arsi Zone
- Time zone: UTC+3 (EAT)

Arsi Robe is a town in south-eastern Oromia. It is named after the nearby Robe River. It is the administrative centre of the Robe (Aanaa) in the Arsi Zone of the Oromia State, this town has a latitude and longitude of 09°36′N 39°08′E with an elevation of 2435 meters above sea level.

According to the Oromia Regional government, this town currently has telephone and postal service, and is supplied with electricity for 24 hours from Melka Wakena Hydroelectric Power. A market is held on Saturdays. A notable local landmark is the prison farm, which existed as early as 1961, and in the 1980s housed 850 prisoners.

== Demographics ==
Based on figures from the Central Statistical Agency in 2005, Robe has an estimated total population of 17,144 of whom 8,200 are men and 8,944 are women. The 1994 national census reported this town had a total population of 9,599 of whom 4,447 were men and 5,152 were women.
