= Diksis =

Woreda (district) in Ethiopia

Diksis is one of the woredas in the Oromia Region of Ethiopia. It is part of the Arsi Zone and was separated from the Tena woreda.

== Demographics ==
According to the 2007 national census, Diksis had a total population of 72,301, comprising 35,970 men and 36,331 women. Approximately 7,854 or 10.86% of the population were urban dwellers. The majority of the inhabitants said they were Muslim, with 62.92% of the population reporting they observed this belief, while 36.71% of the population practised Ethiopian Orthodox Christianity.
