= Oumer Hussein =

Ethiopian politician

- Umer Husseen Obbaa

Minister of Agriculture
- Incumbent
- Assumed office 23 October 2018
- President: Sahle-Work Zewde
- Prime Minister: Abiy Ahmed
- Preceded by: Shiferaw Shigute

Personal details
- Born: 15 September 1972 (age 53) Tijo, Arsi Province, Ethiopian Empire
- Party: Prosperity Party
- Other political affiliations: Ethiopian People's Revolutionary Democratic Front; Oromo Democratic Party

Oumer Hussien Oba (Oromo: Umer Husseen Obbaa; born 15 September 1972) is an Ethiopian politician who is the current Minister of Agriculture since 23 October 2018. He is a member of the Oromia regional parliament and a member of the ruling Prosperity Party.

== Early life and education ==
Oumer was born in Tijo, Arsi Zone, Oromia. He received his BA in economics in Ethiopia and MBA from Greenwich University, London, United Kingdom

== Career ==
Mr. Oumer was served as head of Arsi Zone Finance and Revenues Bureau later Vice President of the Oromia Regional Government and Head of Bureaus of Urban Development and Agriculture. Before assuming office as Minister of Agriculture, Umer was assigned as Director General of Ethiopian Revenues & Customs Authority with the rank of Minister on 19 April 2018.

== See also ==
- Council of Ministers
