= Gobesa =

Gobesa is a town in southeastern Ethiopia. Located in the Arsi Zone of the Oromia Region, this town has a latitude and longitude of 07°37′N 39°30′E with an elevation of 2353 meters above sea level. It is the administrative center of Sherka woreda.

According to the Oromia Regional government, this town currently has a telephone station and a post office. Recently it has got access to electric power. It is also being connected to other nearby towns such as medero and Ticho.

Based on figures from the Central Statistical Agency in 2005, Gobesa has an estimated total population of 10,170 of whom 5,010 were males and 5,160 were females. The 1994 national census reported this town had a total population of 5,689 of whom 2,717 were males and 2,972 were females.
