= Girma Amente =

Ethiopian politician

Minister of Agriculture of Ethiopia
- In office January 2023 – August 1, 2025
- Prime Minister: Abiy Ahmed
- Preceded by: Oumer Hussein
- Succeeded by: Addisu Arega

Personal details
- Education: Haramaya University, Ethiopia; Swedish Agriculture University; Albert Ludwig University of Freiburg

Girma Amente is an Ethiopian Politician who served as Ethiopian's minister of Agriculture from January 2023 to August 2025. He is also a member of the Board of Management of Development Bank of Ethiopia since February 12, 2024.

== Education ==
Girma obtained his BSc in Forestry, at Haramaya University, Ethiopia, MSc in Production Forestry, at Swedish Agriculture University and Ph.D. in Civil Culture from Albert Ludwig University of Freiburg, Germany.
