= Sedika =

Sedika Sadiika (Oromo)
- Town
- Location within Ethiopia
- Country: Ethiopia
- Region: (Oromia Region) Oromia
- Zone: Arsi Zone
- Time zone: UTC+3 (EAT)

Sedika is a small town located in the Arsi Zone of Oromia Regional State, it is one of two towns in Robe District. It is named after the clan of the Arsi Oromo who lived there. It is the town center for many local divisions surrounding it. Sedika is located approximately 233 km in the south east of Addis Ababa. It had only secondary school but recently got upgraded to 10th grade. Many children in the local drop out of school due to the difficult life there, mainly those living in the lower land, who depend on farming have less access to education.

This area of Arsi is known for its crop production and animal grazing. The lack of market access for their products has affected the livelihood of many farmers, and they live in very bad situations even if they are working hard.

== Demographics ==
Based on figures from the Central Statistical Agency in 2005, Sedika has an estimated total population of 2,604 of whom 1,206 are men and 1,398 are women. The 1994 national census reported the town had a total population of 1,459 of whom 654 were men and 805 were women.

The fertile land of Sedika area produces all types of crops, which were sent to Finfinne/Addis Ababa.
