= Sherka =

District located in Oromia Regional State of Ethiopia

Coordinates: 7°35′N 39°30′E

Sirka Sirka (Oromo)
- District
- Location within Ethiopia
- Country: Ethiopia
- Region: (Oromia Region) Oromia
- Zone: Arsi Zone
- Time zone: UTC+3 (EAT)

Sherka is one of the Aanaas in the Oromia Regional State of Ethiopia. Research by Ulrich Braukämper uncovered a local tradition that traced the origins of this woreda's name to an ancient Ethiopian province, Sharkha, which vanished as a political unit in the 16th century. Part of the Arsi Zone, Sirkaa is bordered on the south by the Shebelle River which separates it from the Bale Zone, on the southwest by Bekoji, on the west by Digeluna Tijo, on the north by Tena, and on the east by Robe. Gobesa is the administrative center; other towns include Gaadoo Gunaa.

== Overview ==
The altitude of this woreda ranges from 350 to 1350 meters above sea level. Perennial rivers include 25 kilometers of the Gumelo and 20 of the Rapese. A survey of the land in this woreda shows that 21.4% is arable or cultivable, 6.3% pasture, 2.7% forest, and the remaining 69.6% is considered swampy, mountainous or otherwise unusable. Pepper, black and white cumin and fenugreek are important cash crops.

Industry in the woreda includes 10 grain mills employing 31 people, as well as 671 registered businesses of which 23% were wholesalers, 40% retailers and 36% service providers. There were 32 Farmers Associations with 14,991 members and 6 Farmers Service Cooperatives with 14,315 members. Sirkaa has 77 kilometers of dry-weather and 22 of all-weather road, for an average road density of 91.6 kilometers per 1000 square kilometers, which the Oromia state government notes has not been maintained; 34 kilometers of road between Gobeessaa and Beqqoojjii, and 15 kilometers from Gobeessaa to Tareta are in the planning stages. About 51.1% of the total population has access to drinking water.

== Demographics ==
The 2007 national census reported a total population for this woreda of 163,823, of whom 81,812 were men and 82,011 were women; 12,494 or 7.63% of its population were urban dwellers. The majority of the inhabitants said they were Muslim, with 54.19% of the population reporting they observed this belief, while 45.52% of the population practised Ethiopian Orthodox Christianity.

Based on figures published by the Central Statistical Agency in 2005, this woreda has an estimated total population of 157,640, of whom 78,968 are men and 78,672 are women; 11,870 or 7.53% of its population are urban dwellers, which is less than the Zone average of 12.3%. With an estimated area of 1,080.78 square kilometers, Sherka has an estimated population density of 145.9 people per square kilometer, which is greater than the Zone average of 132.2.

The 1994 national census reported a total population for this woreda of 112,743, of whom 56,527 were men and 56,216 women; 6,642 or 5.89% of its population were urban dwellers at the time. The two largest ethnic groups reported in Sherka were Oromo (71.83%), and Amhara (26.83%); all other ethnic groups made up 1.34% of the population. Oromiffa was spoken as a first language by 65.98%, and 33.91% spoke Amharic; the remaining 0.11% spoke all other primary languages reported. The majority of the inhabitants professed Ethiopian Orthodox Christianity, with 50.53% of the population having reported they practiced that belief, while 49.22% of the population said they were Muslim.
