= Meraro =

Town located in Oromia state of Ethiopia

Meraro Maraaro (Oromo)
- Town
- Location within Ethiopia Location within Africa
- Coordinates: 07°24′36″N 39°14′8″E
- Country: Ethiopia
- Region: Oromia
- Zone: Arsi
- Woreda: Limuna Bilbilo
- Elevation: 3,030 m (9,940 ft)

Population (2005)
  - Total: 4,307
- Time zone: UTC+3 ( EAT)

Meraro is a town located in the Arsi Zone of Oromia Regional State to the south of Bekoji, it has a latitude and longitude of 7°41′N 39°25′E with an elevation of 3,030 meters.

Based on figures from the Central Statistical Agency of Ethiopia published in 2005, Meraro has an estimated total population of 4,307 consisting of 2,036 men and 2, 271 women. The 1994 census reported this town had a total population of 2,412 of whom 1,104 were males and 1,308 were females. It is one of five towns in Limuna Bilbilo Aanaa.
