= Lude Hitosa =

District (aanaa) in Oromia, Ethiopia

Coordinates: 8.07°N 39.42°E

Loodee Heexosaa is one of the aanaas in Oromia Regional State of Ethiopia. It is part of the Arsi Zone. It was separated from Heexosaa Aanaa. Huruta is the main town of Aanaa.

== Demographics ==
The 2007 national census reported a total population for this woreda of 107,133, of whom 53,522 were men and 53,611 were women; 15,298 or 14.28% of its population were urban dwellers. The majority of the inhabitants said they practised Ethiopian Orthodox Christianity, with 53.49% of the population reporting they observed this belief, while 45.22% of the population were Muslim, and 1.22% of the population were Protestant.
