= Mount Chilalo =

Mountain in Ethiopia

Chilalo
- Location within Ethiopia

Highest point
- Elevation: 4,071 m (13,356 ft)
- Prominence: 610.01 m (2,001.3 ft)
- Coordinates: 7°55′N 39°16′E

Geography
- Location: Arsi Zone, Oromia Region, Ethiopia

Geology
- Mountain type: Stratovolcano

Mount Chilalo is an isolated, extinct silicic stratovolcano in southeastern Ethiopia. Its highest point (4036 m or 13,241 ft a.s.l.), in the Arsi Zone of the Oromia Region, is located in Arsi Mountains National Park on the border between the Hitosa and Tiyo woreda (07°55′N 39°16′E).

The mountain has an elliptical base (about 30 by 20 kilometers), whose major axis lies NNE-SSW or parallel to the predominant tectonic trend. Chilalo rises with gentle slopes for more than 1500 meters from the top of the plateau. At the summit, there is a large, almost circular caldera about 6 kilometers in diameter, whose southern rim is considered to be the mountain's summit. Mount Chilalo last erupted in the Pleistocene.

One authority identifies Mount Chilalo as a late Trap Series volcano. The geologist Erik Nilsson claimed to have identified traces of glaciation on Chilalo, as well as on its neighbor Mount Kaka down to about 3400 meters, which he dated to the "Last Pluvial Period". Although this mountain is located south of the East African Rift, along with Mount Gugu to the north and Mount Kaka to the south, it is considered, geologically speaking, part of the Ethiopian Highlands.
