= Robe (woreda) =

District in Oromia Region in Ethiopia

Coordinates: 7°51′N 39°37′E

Arsi Robe(Arsii Roobee) Roobee (Oromo)
- District
- Location within Ethiopia
- Country: Ethiopia
- Region: (Oromia Region) Oromia
- Zone: Arsi
- Time zone: UTC+3 (EAT)

Robe is one of the woredas in the Oromia Region of Ethiopia. It is named after the Robe River, 80 kilometers of which flows through the woreda. Part of the Arsi Zone, Robe is bordered on the south by the Shebelle River which separates it from the Bale Zone, on the southwest by Sherka, on the west by Tena, on the north by Sude, on the northeast by Amigna, and on the east by Seru. The administrative center of the woreda is Robe; other towns in Robe include Habe and Sedika.

== Overview ==
The altitude of this woreda ranges from 1200 to 4000 meters above sea level. Rivers include 45 kilometers of the Hulull and 40 kilometers of the Wabe; the gorge of the Wabe is a local landmark. A survey of the land in this woreda shows that 51.1% is arable or cultivable, 4.9% pasture, 16.3% forest, and the remaining 27.7% is considered swampy, mountainous or otherwise unusable. Oil seeds, specifically flax, nueg and rape seed, are important cash crops; Robe is one of the major producers of oil seeds in the Zone.

Industry in the woreda includes 38 small-scale industries employing 93 persons, which include 38 grain mills. Other commercial activity consists of 1160 registered businesses of which 32.8% are wholesalers, 42.2% retailers and 19% service providers. There were 28 Farmers Associations with 15,116 members and 10 Farmers Service Cooperatives with 14,471 members. Robe has 75 kilometers of feeder roads, 36 kilometers of dry-weather and 44 of all-weather road, for an average of road density of 117 kilometers per 1000 square kilometers; 54 kilometers of rural road are under construction. About 19.5% of the total population has access to drinking water; a water supply project is under construction.

== Demographics ==
The 2007 national census reported a total population for this woreda of 165,210, of whom 83,129 were men and 82,081 were women; 20,680 or 12.52% of its population were urban dwellers. The majority of the inhabitants said they were Muslim, with 61.78% of the population reporting they observed this belief, while 37.77% of the population practised Ethiopian Orthodox Christianity.

Based on figures published by the Central Statistical Agency in 2005, this woreda has an estimated total population of 168,043, of whom 84,551 were males and 83,492 were females; 22,947 or 13.66% of its population are urban dwellers, which is greater than the Zone average of 12.3%. With an estimated area of 1,322.50 square kilometers, Robe has an estimated population density of 127.1 people per square kilometer, which is less than the Zone average of 132.2.

The 1994 national census reported a total population for this woreda of 118,457, of whom 59,067 were men and 59,390 women; 12,847 or 10.85% of its population were urban dwellers at the time. The three largest ethnic groups reported in Robe were Oromo (86.11%), Amhara (11.25%), and Soddo Gurage (1.39%); all other ethnic groups made up 1.25% of the population. Oromiffa was spoken as a first language by 84.15%, and 15.22% spoke Amharic; the remaining 0.63% spoke all other primary languages reported. The majority of the inhabitants were Muslim, with 59.23% of the population having reported they practiced that belief, while 40.41% of the population said they professed Ethiopian Orthodox Christianity.
