= Bekoji =

Town in Oromia Region, Ethiopia

Bekoji በቆጂ
- Town
- Location within Ethiopia
- Coordinates: 07°35′N 39°20′E
- Country: Ethiopia
- State: (Oromia Region) Oromia
- Zone: Arsi

Population (2005)
  - Total: 16,730
- Time zone: UTC+3 (EAT)
- Climate: Cwb

Bekoji (Oromo: Boqojjii, Amharic: በቆጂ) is a town in central Ethiopia. Located in the Arsi Zone of the Oromia Region, it has a latitude and longitude of 7°35′N 39°10′E with an elevation of 2810 m. It is the administrative centre of Limuna Bilbilo woreda.

This town is located on the all-weather road to Goba built during the Italian occupation, 56 km south of Asella, and 50 km east of Lake Langano (the road from Assela through Goba and south to Dodola is now in 2013 tarmac all the way to Goba). A local landmark is the church of Liemu Maryam, east of Bekoji.

Bekoji is also known as the home town of many famous Ethiopian athletes. They include: Derartu Tulu, Fatuma Roba, Tiki Gelana, Mestawet Tufa, the Bekele brothers (Kenenisa and Tariku) and the Dibaba sisters Ejegayehu, Tirunesh and Genzebe. Young athletes in Bekoji are featured in the 2012 documentary film Town of Runners.

== History ==
Besides building a road from Asella to Bekoji, during the occupation the Italians also built a small fort outside the town. After Asela had been captured in April 1941, Henfrey's Scouts (a small force of Ethiopian irregulars) continued south to capture Bekoji supported by armored cars. Because of heavy mud, increasing rains and a shortage of fuel, only a small unit reached the outpost at Bekoji.

The Baptist General Conference operated a mission station at Bekoji, performing medical work during the 1950s. By 1965, Bekoji contained the woreda governor's office, associated administrative buildings, and some local security facilities. There was all-weather road connection and telephone link to Asella. The major market day was Saturday, and a minor market was held on Tuesday. Trade centered on crops, livestock, seeds and foodstuffs. Most of the commercial buildings were drinking establishments.

The Chilalo Agricultural Development Union established a marketing centre here in 1970. Ingvar Jonsson made field interviews with farmers in the area between July 1973 and May 1974. He reported that about 90% of all interviewed tenants had sharecropping agreement, with rent to the landowner ranging between one third and one half of the crop. Studying aerial photos, Jonsson concluded 94 households had been removed from Bekoji while 282 new households had been established.

== Demographics ==
Based on figures from the Central Statistical Agency in 2005, this town has an estimated total population of 16,730, of whom 7,999 are men and 8,731 are women. The 1994 national census reported this town had a total population of 9,367, of whom 4,338 were men and 5,029 were women.

== Climate ==
Climate data for Bekoji, elevation 2,850 m (9,350 ft), (1971–2000)
Month	Jan	Feb	Mar	Apr	May	Jun	Jul	Aug	Sep	Oct	Nov	Dec	Year
Mean daily maximum °C (°F)	20.5 (68.9)	21.0 (69.8)	21.2 (70.2)	20.2 (68.4)	19.8 (67.6)	18.4 (65.1)	16.1 (61.0)	16.2 (61.2)	17.5 (63.5)	18.2 (64.8)	19.2 (66.6)	20.3 (68.5)	19.0 (66.3)
Mean daily minimum °C (°F)	6.3 (43.3)	7.2 (45.0)	8.2 (46.8)	8.3 (46.9)	7.6 (45.7)	6.9 (44.4)	7.1 (44.8)	6.7 (44.1)	6.6 (43.9)	6.0 (42.8)	5.5 (41.9)	5.1 (41.2)	6.8 (44.2)
Average precipitation mm (inches)	30.0 (1.18)	43.0 (1.69)	75.0 (2.95)	81.0 (3.19)	100.0 (3.94)	114.0 (4.49)	198.0 (7.80)	174.0 (6.85)	91.0 (3.58)	55.0 (2.17)	19.0 (0.75)	10.0 (0.39)	990 (38.98)
Average relative humidity (%)	54	57	58	59	66	73	85	86	82	72	61	56	67
Source: FAO
