= Munesa =

District located in Oromia Regional State of Ethiopia

Coordinates: 7°30′N 38°50′E

Munesa Muneessa (Oromo)
- District
- Location within Ethiopia
- Country: Ethiopia
- Region: (Oromia Region) Oromia
- Zone: Arsi Zone
- Time zone: UTC+3 (EAT)

Munesa is one of the Aanaas in the Oromia Regional State of Ethiopia. Part of the Arsi Zone located in the Great Rift Valley, Munesa is bordered on the south and west by the West Arsi Zone and Lake Langano, on the northwest by Batu Dugda, on the north by Tiyo, on the northeast by Digeluna Tijo, and on the east by Bekoji. The administrative center of the woreda is Kersa; other towns in Munesa include Ego.

== Overview ==
The altitude of this woreda ranges from 1500 over 4100 meters above sea level. The highest point in this woreda is Mount Chiqe (4193 meters); another notable peak is Kulsa. Rivers include 45 kilometers of the Kessa, 50 of the Teji, 60 of the Guracho, 60 of the Gadamsa and 55 kilometers of the Metna; all of these flow into the Rift valley. A survey of the land in this woreda shows that 37.1% is arable or cultivable, 24.1% pasture, 34.6% forest, and the remaining 4.2% is considered swampy, mountainous or otherwise unusable. Lole state farm, which grows wheat and rape seed, occupies a large part of the arable land. Rape seed and linseed are important cash crops; hides and skins are major export items. Although Coffee is also an important cash crop, less than 20 square kilometers are planted with it.

Industry in the woreda includes quarries along the shore of Lake Langano and 29 grain mills employing 78 people, as well as 910 registered businesses of whom 15.7% are wholesalers, 30.9% retailers, and 53.3% service providers. There were 38 Farmers Associations with 15,870 members and 5 Farmers Service Cooperatives with 9611 members. Munesa has 105 kilometers of dry-weather and 98 of all-weather road, for an average road density of 139.5 kilometers per 1000 square kilometers. About 4.9% of the total population has access to drinking water.

Four inscribed Islamic gravestones have been found near Lake Langano, which are similar to other inscribed gravestones in southeastern Ethiopia that have been dated between AD 1000 and 1270. G.W.B. Huntingford explains their presence as evidence for Muslim traders on the trade route which extended from Zeila and Berbera to the Sidama regions south of Lake Zway, if not Muslim settlement in the area.

== Demographics ==
The 2007 national census reported a total population for this woreda of 166,539, of whom 82,559 were men and 83,980 were women; 15,171 or 9.11% of its population were urban dwellers. The majority of the inhabitants said they were Muslim, with 51.19% of the population reporting they observed this belief, while 45.79% of the population practised Ethiopian Orthodox Christianity, and 2.2% of the population were Protestant.

Based on figures published by the Central Statistical Agency in 2005, this woreda has an estimated total population of 207,422, of whom 105,280 are men and 102,142 are women; 17,430 or 8.40% of its population are urban dwellers, which is less than the Zone average of 12.3%. With an estimated area of 1,454.85 square kilometers, Munesa has an estimated population density of 142.6 people per square kilometer, which is greater than the Zone average of 132.2.

The 1994 national census reported a total population for this woreda of 148,030, of whom 73,208 were men and 74,822 women; 9,756 or 6.59% of its population were urban dwellers at the time. The two largest ethnic groups reported in Munesa were the Oromo (91.59%), and the Amhara (7.34%); all other ethnic groups made up 1.07% of the population. Oromiffa was spoken as a first language by 91.53%, and 7.94% spoke Amharic; the remaining 0.53% spoke all other primary languages reported. The majority of the inhabitants were Muslim, with 52.54% of the population having reported they practiced that belief, while 46.43% of the population said they professed Ethiopian Orthodox Christianity, and 0.89% were Protestant.
