= Limuna Bilbilo =

District in Oromia Region, Ethiopia

Limuna Bilbilo is one of the woredas in the Oromia Region of Ethiopia. It is part of the Arsi Zone. It was part of former Bekoji woreda which was divided for Enkelo Wabe and Limuna Bilbilo woredas. The name Limu stands for the Arsi Oromo sub-clan, which dominantly harbored in the district and Bilbilo is the name of mountain found in the district. The administrative center of this woreda is Bekoji; other towns include Meraro.

== Demographics ==
The 2007 national census reported a total population for this woreda of 180,695, of whom 89,352 were men and 91,343 were women; 23,340 or 12.92% of its population were urban dwellers. The majority of the inhabitants said they practised Ethiopian Orthodox Christianity, with 50.04% of the population reporting they observed this belief, while 45.68% of the population were Muslim, and 4.07% of the population were Protestant.
