= Dera, Ethiopia =

Town in Oromia Region, Ethiopia

Dera Dheeraa
- Town
- Location within Ethiopia
- Coordinates: 8°20′N 39°19′E
- Country: Ethiopia
- Region: Oromia
- Zone: Arsi

Population (2005)
  - Total: 16,731
- Time zone: UTC+3 (EAT)

Dera (or Dheeraa) is a town in southeastern Ethiopia. Located in the Arsi Zone of the Oromia Region, this town has a latitude and longitude of 08°20′N 39°19′E. It is the administrative center of Dodotana Sire woreda.

By the late 1960s, Dera was provided with electricity from a dam on the Awash River. In October 1969, Emperor Haile Selassie inaugurated a water supply system for the town built at a cost of Birr 170,000. The system drew water from the Awash II dam 10 kilometers away. A weekly market is held on Mondays, where grain and livestock can be bought and sold. According to the Oromia Regional government, this town is currently supplied with electricity 24 hours a day, and has telephone service. Construction on the 99 kilometer road between Chole and Dera was completed and opened for traffic 15 August 2009, at a cost of over 146 million Birr. The Ethiopian Roads Authority reported that the new road would reduce the distance between the two towns by a half.

On 17 May 1974, an official in Dera had a dispute with local farmers regarding land 7 kilometers away. The official returned with some city men and two police, and a fight with the locals ensued, in which two of the farmers and one of the police were killed. The local police at Asella wanted to occupy the site of the fight and place the inhabitants under military rule. The Governor General of Arsi Province refused to allow them to do this, but was himself soon arrested and removed.

== Demographics ==
Based on figures from the Central Statistical Agency in 2005, Dera has an estimated total population of 116,731, of whom 69,367 are men and 47,364 are women. The 1994 national census reported a total population for this town of 9,356, of whom 4,538 were men and 4,818 women. The three largest ethnic groups reported in Dera were the Oromo (76.52%), the Amhara (18.16%), and the Silt'e (2.62%); all other ethnic groups made up 2.7% of the population.Oromiffa was spoken as a first language by 72.32%, 24.52% spoke Amharic, and 2.04% spoke Silt'e; the remaining 1.12% spoke all other primary languages reported. The majority of the inhabitants were Moslem, with 77.49% of the population reporting they observed this belief, while 20.79% of the population said they were Ethiopian Orthodox Christianity, and 1.51% were Protestant.

History

The name Dera or Dheeraa, in Oromo Language, has the meaning of length or long. There is no definitely known reason for this naming. But it could be related to the long running plain topography of the area that stretches between the City of Adama or Nazareth and the town of Itayya. Historically Dera (Dheeraa) has been inhibited by various Arsi Oromo sub clans. As the rest of towns in Ethiopia Dera formalized in to town administration after the brief occupation of Italy. Italy had constructed the road that passed through Dera and connects the town of Asalla and Adama. When Emperor Menelik II of Showa was attempted to subdue the Arsi province he had faced stiff resistance from various Arsi Oromo clans who organized themselves under the famous warrior Lenjiso Diga (Leenjisoo Diigaa) . Other leaders of the Arsi Oromo war of resistance was including Irresso Tongo (Irreessoo Tongoo, Uje Baje ( Ujee Baajee ) and other clan warriors and leaders who had played a significant role in the resistance war of the Arsi against Showan domination. In one of the wars that has been fought between 1880 and 1886 the Arsi warriors under the leadership of Lenjiso Diga and Irresso Tongo had captured the Menelik's mistress Woizero Bafana. In the war that Menelik himself was barely escaped death the Lode sub clan of Arsi had fought bravely and was awarded a spear taken from Emperor Menelik. When peace agreement has been after six or seven years of numerous bloody battles following the total defeat of Arsi people in the famous war taken place in Azule and after reconciliation between Emperor Menelik II and Arsi has been concluded, Woizero Bafana has been repatriated. During her stay as prisoner of war in the hands of Arsi warriors all respect and protection has been accorded to her both as woman and in her status as mistress of the King.
