= Kersa, Arsi =

Town in the Oromia Region, Ethiopia

Kersa is a town located in the Arsi Zone of the Oromia Region, in southeastern Ethiopia. This town has a latitude and longitude of 07°32′N 38°59′E with an elevation of 2784 meters above sea level. It is the administrative center of Munesa woreda.

According to the Oromia Regional government, this town currently has telephone and postal service, and is supplied with electricity for four hours a day. Records at the Nordic Africa Institute website provide details of a primary school in Kersa in 1968, and a clinic operated by the Lutheran Church in 1992.

Based on figures from the Central Statistical Agency in 2005, Kersa has an estimated total population of 9,038 of whom 4,377 are men and 4,661 are women. The 1994 national census reported this town had a total population of 5,059 of whom 2,374 were men and 2,685 were women.
