= Sagure =

Sagure Saguree
- Town
- Location within Ethiopia
- Coordinates: 07°45′N 39°09′E
- Country: Ethiopia
- Region: Oromia
- Zone: Arsi
- Woreda: Digeluna Tijo
- Elevation: 2,568 m (8,425 ft)

Population (2005)
  - Total: 9,960
- Time zone: UTC+3 (EAT)

Sagure is a town in south-eastern Ethiopia. Located in the Arsi Zone of the Oromia, this town has a latitude and longitude of 07°45′N 39°09′E with an elevation of 2568 meters above sea level. It is the administrative center of Digeluna Tijo, woreda.

Based on figures from the Central Statistical Agency in 2005, Sagure has an estimated total population of 9960 of whom 4597 were males and 5363 were females. The 1994 census reported this town had a total population of 5,582 of whom 2,493 were males and 3,089 were females.

Records at the Nordic Africa Institute website include the results of a survey performed by members of the Chilalo Agricultural Development Union. In April 1967 they reported that Sagure had about 400 households with a little more than 1,300 settled inhabitants, but there could be 8,000 visitors on the market day. Of individuals older than 10, about 50% of the males and 10% of the females could read and write; one quarter of the family heads had attended school at some period. The inhabitants were about 50% Oromo and 30% Amhara, of whom only 10% did not belong to the Ethiopian Orthodox Church.
