= Ogolcho =

Town in Oromia Region, Ethiopia

Ogolcho is a town in southeastern Ethiopia. Located in the Arsi Zone of the Oromia Region, it has a latitude and longitude of 08°03′N 39°00′E with an elevation of 1687 meters above sea level. It is the administrative center of Ziway Dugda woreda.

== Overview ==
According to the Oromia Regional government, this town currently has telephone service, postal service, and electricity.

According to materials on the Nordic Africa Institute website, Ogolcho was the administrative center of a woreda at least as early as the 1980s.

According to data from the Central Statistical Agency in 2005, the population of Ogolcho was estimated to be 4,338, with 2,220 males and 2,118 females. In contrast, the 1994 national census indicated that the town had a population of 2,424, consisting of 1,204 males and 1,220 females.

== Climate ==
Climate data for Ogolcho, elevation 1,800 m (5,900 ft)
Month	Jan	Feb	Mar	Apr	May	Jun	Jul	Aug	Sep	Oct	Nov	Dec	Year
Mean daily maximum °C (°F)	26.2 (79.2)	26.6 (79.9)	27.3 (81.1)	28.5 (83.3)	28.6 (83.5)	27.0 (80.6)	24.6 (76.3)	24.2 (75.6)	24.3 (75.7)	26.2 (79.2)	25.5 (77.9)	26.2 (79.2)	26.3 (79.3)
Daily mean °C (°F)	18.2 (64.8)	19.3 (66.7)	20.2 (68.4)	20.8 (69.4)	20.7 (69.3)	20.2 (68.4)	19.5 (67.1)	19.2 (66.6)	18.7 (65.7)	19.2 (66.6)	17.8 (64.0)	17.5 (63.5)	19.3 (66.7)
Mean daily minimum °C (°F)	10.3 (50.5)	12.1 (53.8)	12.8 (55.0)	13.1 (55.6)	12.8 (55.0)	13.3 (55.9)	14.3 (57.7)	14.1 (57.4)	13.1 (55.6)	12.3 (54.1)	10.3 (50.5)	8.8 (47.8)	12.3 (54.1)
Average precipitation mm (inches)	12 (0.5)	47 (1.9)	44 (1.7)	85 (3.3)	41 (1.6)	72 (2.8)	132 (5.2)	118 (4.6)	89 (3.5)	32 (1.3)	11 (0.4)	6 (0.2)	689 (27)
Average relative humidity (%)	52	48	50	50	53	63	76	79	78	64	49	48	59
Source: FAO
