= Hitosa =

District in Oromia Region, Ethiopia

Coordinates: 8°05′N 39°15′E

Hitosa Hittoosaa (Oromo)
- Woreda
- Location within Ethiopia
- Country: Ethiopia
- Region: (Oromia Region) Oromia
- Zone: Arsi Zone
- Time zone: UTC+3 (EAT)

Hitosa (Oromo: Heexxoosaa) is one of the woredas in the Oromia Region of Ethiopia. The woreda of Lude Hitosa was separated from Hitosa. Part of the Arsi Zone, Hitosa is bordered on the south by Digeluna Tijo, on the southwest by Tiyo, on the west by Batu Dugda, on the northwest by the East Shewa Zone, on the northeast by Dodotana Sire, and on the east by Tena. The administrative center of the woreda is Iteya; other towns include Borujawi and Ligaba.

== Geography ==
The altitude of this woreda ranges from 1500 to 4170 meters above sea level; Mount Chilalo is the highest point. Rivers include 20 kilometers of the Keleta, 8 kilometers of the Wedecha and 10 kilometers of the Gonde. A survey of the land in this woreda shows that 52.8% is arable or cultivable (46.5% was planted in cereals), 16.3% pasture, 28.1% forest, and the remaining 2.8% is considered swampy, mountainous or otherwise unusable. Annole is a local landmark. Major crops (cereal and pulse) in order of total production includes: Wheat, barley, maize, faba bean, teff, sorghum and field peas.Onions, potatoes and sugar cane are important cash crops.

Industry in the woreda includes 60 small scale industries, including 47 grain mills, employing 230 people, and 1465 registered businesses, of whom 27.7% wholesalers, 39.4% retailers and 32.9% service providers. There were 37 Farmers Associations with 29,093 members and 11 Farmers Service Cooperatives with 18,182 members. Hitosa has 68 kilometers of dry-weather and 161 all-weather road, for an average road density of 188 kilometers per 1000 square kilometers. About 55.3% of the total population has access to drinking water.

== History ==
=== Aanolee massacre ===
In Hitosa, the Aanolee massacre took place on 6 September 1886, in which Emperor Menelik II's army massacred 11,000 Arsi Oromo in one day, cutting women's breasts and men's hands. In 2014, a monument has been erected to remember the victims.

== Demographics ==
The 2007 national census reported a total population for this woreda of 124,219, of whom 62,466 were men and 61,753 were women; 18,481 or 14.88% of its population were urban dwellers. The majority of the inhabitants said they were Muslim, with 53.77% of the population reporting they observed this belief, while 44.72% of the population practised Ethiopian Orthodox Christianity, and 1.3% of the population were Protestant.

Based on figures published by the Central Statistical Agency in 2005, this woreda has an estimated total population of 248,304, of whom 124,808 are men and 123,496 are women; 37,820 or 15.23% of its population are urban dwellers, which is greater than the Zone average of 12.3%. With an estimated area of 1,215.47 square kilometers, Hitosa has an estimated population density of 204.3 people per square kilometer, which is greater than the Zone average of 132.2.

The 1994 national census reported a total population for this woreda of 174,360, of whom 86,930 were men and 87,430 women; 21,160 or 12.14% of its population were urban dwellers at the time. The three largest ethnic groups reported in Hitosa were Oromo (80.74%), Amhara (17.8%), and Silt'e (0.62%); all other ethnic groups made up 0.84% of the population. Oromiffa was spoken as a first language by 76.64%, 10.24% Amharic, and 0.39% spoke Silt'e; the remaining 0.73% spoke all other primary languages reported. The majority of the inhabitants professed Ethiopian Orthodox Christianity, with 53.93% of the population having reported they practiced that belief, while 45.42% of the population said they were Muslim.
