= Iteya =

Town in Oromia Region, Ethiopia

Iteya Itaya, Itiya, Eteya, Etya, Etaya
- Town
- Location within Ethiopia
- Coordinates: 08°08′N 39°14′E
- Country: Ethiopia
- Region: Oromia
- Zone: Arsi Zone
- Woreda: Hitosa
- Elevation: 2,215 m (7,267 ft)

Population (2005)
  - Total: 3,601
- Time zone: UTC+3 (EAT)

Iteya is a town in southeastern Ethiopia. Located in the Arsi Zone of the Oromia Region east of Lake Zway. It is the administrative center of the Hitosa woreda.

According to the Oromia Regional government, this town currently has telephone and postal service, and is supplied with electricity from a nearby hydroelectric source. Nordic Africa Institute records a junior secondary school in Iteya in 1968.

Based on figures from the Central Statistical Agency in 2005, Iteya has an estimated total population of 12,979 of whom 6,418 are men and 6,561 are women. The 1994 national census reported this town had a total population of 7260 of whom 3,481 were men and 3,779 were women.
