= Arsi Mountains National Park =

National park in Ethiopia

- IUCN category II (national park)
- Location within Ethiopia
- Location: Arsi Zone, Oromia Region, Ethiopia
- Coordinates: 7°55′53″N 39°12′26″E
- Area: 10,876 km^{2} (4,199 sq mi)
- Established: 2011
- Governing body: Oromia Forest & Wildlife Enterprise (OFWA)

Arsi Mountains National Park is a national park in Arsi Zone of Oromia Region in Ethiopia. It protects a portion of the Ethiopian Highlands and includes montane forests, subalpine heath, and alpine grasslands and shrublands. The park was designated in 2011 and covers an area of 10876 km^{2}.

== Geography ==
The park encompasses the Arsi Mountains, which are part of the Ethiopian Highlands. The mountains extend northeast to southwest through the park, and form the southern wall of the African Rift Valley. Mountains in the park include Dhara Dilfekar block, Mount Chilalo (with a height of 4036 m), the Galama Ridges, Mount Kaka, and Hunkolo. The volcanic caldera of Mount Chilalo is the highest point in the park.

Mountain rainfall sustains numerous streams and alpine lakes such as Lake Ziway. The northern slopes drain towards the Awash River, while the southern slopes are drained by headwater streams of the Shebelle River.

Bale Mountains National Park lies southeast of the Arsi Mountains. The upper valley of the Shebelle River separates the Arsi Mountains from the Bale Mountains.

== Flora and fauna ==
There are three main vegetation zones in the park, generally defined by elevation. Dry evergreen Afromontane forests predominate on the lower slopes, from 2843 to 3756 meters elevation. The dry evergreen forests are interspersed with areas of mixed plantations of native and exotic trees between 3181 and 3340 meters elevation.

Subalpine vegetation, mostly heath shrubland dominated by the shrubs Erica arborea and Erica trimera, occurs above the tree line, from 3202 to 3985 meters elevation.

Afro-alpine vegetation occurs at the highest elevations, from 3576 to 4008 meters. It is made up mostly of grasses, herbs, trees, and shrubs, including species of Helichrysum and Alchemilla, interspersed with stands of the giant lobelia Lobelia rhynchopetalum, which is endemic to the Afro-alpine Ethiopian Highlands.

=== Mammal ===
The Arsi Mountains National Park is home to 30 species that are both common and Endemic to its ecoregion. Endemic wildlife in the park includes the endangered mountain nyala (Tragelaphus buxtoni), Menelik's bushbuck (Tragelaphus scriptus menelik), and Ethiopian wolf (Canis simensis). The park is home to several rare and limited-range highland rodents, including the Ethiopian striped mouse (Mus imberbis), Nikolaus's mouse (Megadendromus nikolausi), Blick's grass rat (Arvicanthis blicki), black-clawed brush-furred rat (Lophuromys melanonyx), and Ethiopian forest brush-furred rat (Lophuromys chrysopus).

Other mammals found common in Dhera Dilfekar block and Chilalo-Galama Mountain Range includes Spotted hyenas, Greater Kudus, Lesser Kudus, Egyptian mongooses, White-tailed mongooses, Black-backed jackals, African civets, Abyssinian hares, Bohor reedbucks, Leopards, Servals, Caracals, Grivet monkeys, Grey duikers, Klipspringers, Rock hyraxes, Common warthogs, and Olive baboons.

=== Birds ===
The Arsi Mountains National Park consists of 99 bird species under 39 families that are recorded with the blocks. Birds species that are common here includes Helmeted Guineafowl, Laughing dove, little bee-eater, Black wood hoopoe, Eastern grey woodpecker, Grey-headed sparrow, Shining Sunbird, Rüppell's long-tailed starling, Red-cheeked cordon-bleu, Speckled mousebird, Ring-necked dove, Black kite, and Long-crested eagle.

=== Activities ===
The Arsi Mountains National Park is one of the parks in Oromia where tourist activities like:

- Wildlife watching
- Bird watching
- Landscape trails like trekking and hiking can be carried out while visiting.

== Conservation and threats ==
Threats to the park include excessive livestock grazing, human-caused fires, and wood collection.
