= Mount Bwahit =

Mountain in Ethiopia

- Buahit
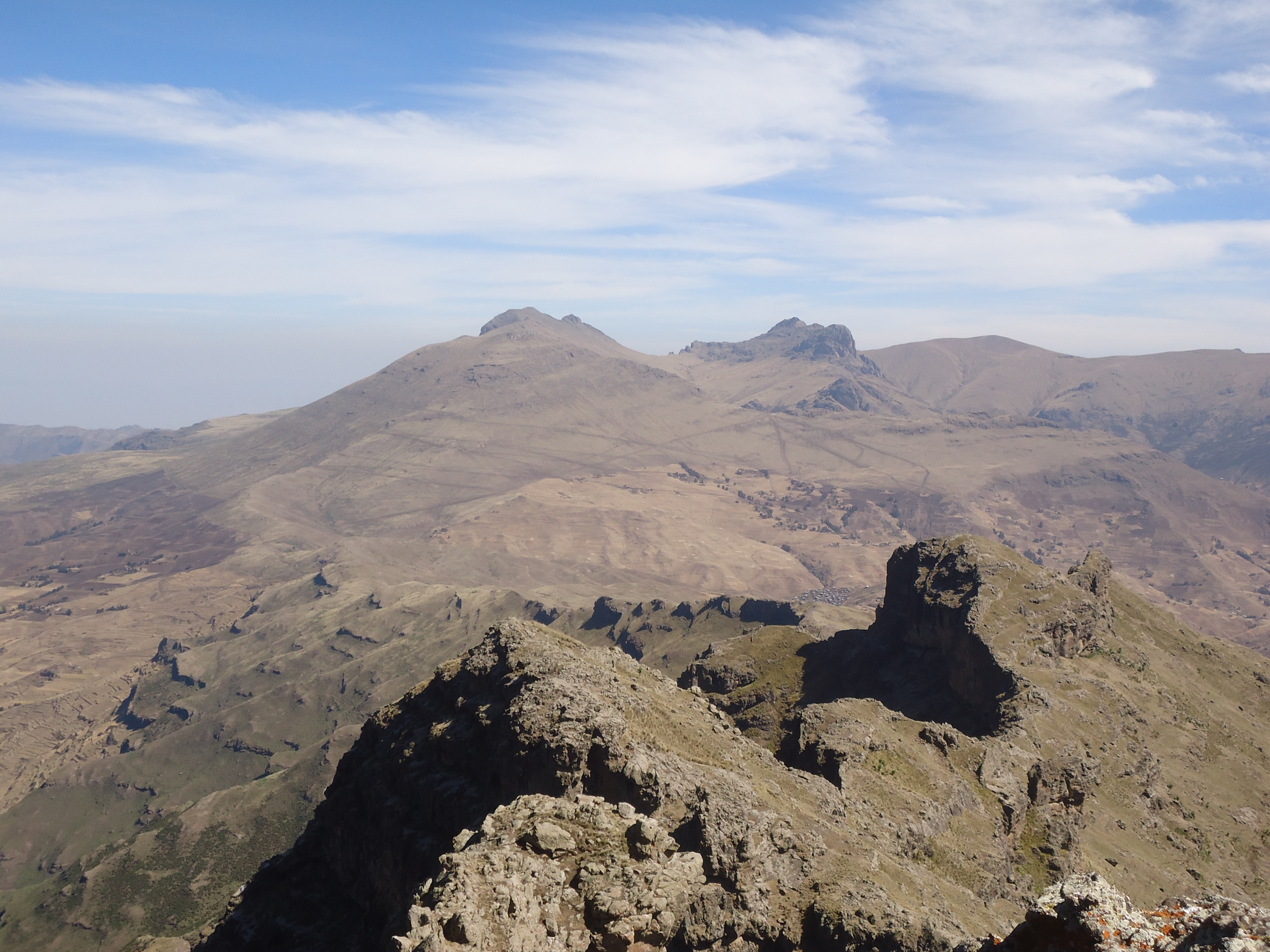

Highest point
- Elevation: 4,437 m (14,557 ft)
- Prominence: 800 m (2,600 ft)
- Coordinates: 13°14′38″N 38°13′04″E

Geography
- Location within Ethiopia
- Location: Amhara Region, Ethiopia
- Parent range: Simien Mountains

Mount Bwahit (Amharic: ቧሒት ተራራ) (or Buahit, Bachit, Buiheat) is a peak of the Simien Mountains in the Amhara Region of Ethiopia. Its altitude is estimated at 4430 or 4437 m above sea level, making it the third highest mountain in Ethiopia and the 13th or 14th highest mountain of Africa. It is located about 16 km west of the highest Ethiopian mountain, Ras Dashen, from which it is separated by a 1,600 m deep gorge. The connecting ridge goes NNE over the Arkwasiye Pass (ca. 3635 m), eastwards over Kidis Yared, at 4,453 metres (14,610 ft) the second-highest mountain in Ethiopia, and SSE over the Metelal Pass at approximately 3730 metres above mean sea level to Ras Dashen.
