= Mont Mohi =

Mountain in the Democratic Republic of Congo

Mount Mohi

Highest point
- Elevation: 3,480 m (11,420 ft)
- Prominence: 1,592 m (5,223 ft)
- Listing: Ultra; Ribu
- Coordinates: 2°57′12″S 28°47′17″E

Geography
- Country: Democratic Republic of the Congo

Location of Mont Mohi in the Democratic Republic of the Congo.

Mont Mohi is a mountain in the Democratic Republic of the Congo. It is located in the province of South Kivu Province, in the eastern part of the country, 1,500 km east of Kinshasa the capital of the country. 3,480 metres (11,420 ft) above sea level.

The land around Mont Mohi is hilly in the southeast, but in the northwest it is a mountain. Panoramas, within a 10 kilometer radius. Mont Mohi is the highest point in the area. There are about 266 people per square kilometre around Mont Mohi which is highly populated. The area around Mont Mohi is almost covered by durowan and bugangan.

== Climate ==
The average temperature is 10 °C (50 °F). The warmest month is December, at 10 °C, and the coldest is November, at 8 °C. The average rainfall is 923 millimetres (36.3 in) per year. The wettest month is December, with 163 mm (6.4 in) of rain, and the driest is July, with 14 mm (0.55 in).

Mont Mohi

Climate chart (precipitation, max. and min. temperature)
J	F	M	A	M	J	J	A	S	O	N	D
72 16 5	88 16 4	120 15 4	90 13 3	51 15 5	28 14 6	14 16 5	29 17 2	81 16 5	90 17 4	97 13 2	163 16 5
- █ Average max. and min. temperatures in °C
- █ Precipitation totals in mm
Imperial conversion
J	F	M	A	M	J	J	A	S	O	N	D
2.8 61 41	3.5 61 39	4.7 59 39	3.5 55 37	2 59 41	1.1 57 43	0.6 61 41	1.1 63 36	3.2 61 41	3.5 63 39	3.8 55 36	6.4 61 41
- █ Average max. and min. temperatures in °F
- █ Precipitation totals in inches
