= Ras Dashen =

Highest mountain in Ethiopia

- ራስ ዳሸን
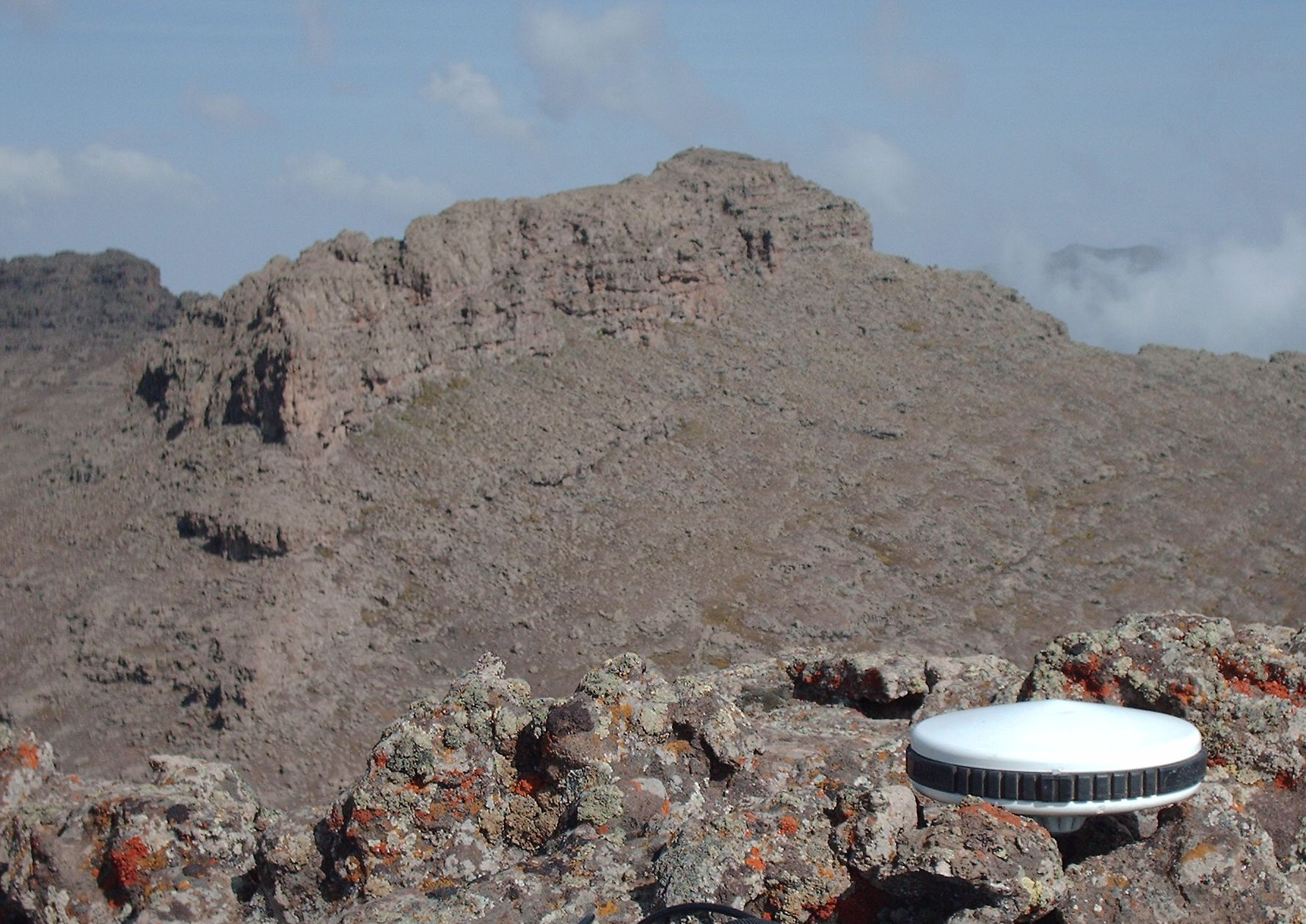

Highest point
- Elevation: 4,550 m (14,930 ft)
- Prominence: 3,997 m (13,114 ft); Ranked 23rd
- Listing: Country high point Ultra; Ribu
- Coordinates: 13°14′09″N 38°22′15″E

Geography
- Location within Ethiopia
- Location: Ethiopia
- Parent range: Simien Mountains

Ras Dashen (Amharic: ራስ ዳሸን rās dāshn) is the highest mountain in Ethiopia. Located in the Simien Mountains National Park in the North Gondar Zone of the Amhara Region, it reaches an elevation of 4,550 metres (14,930 ft).

The English form "Ras Dashen" is a corruption of its Amharic name, "Ras Dejen", the term used by the Ethiopian Mapping Authority (EMA) that alludes to the traditional head or general who fights in front of the Emperor.

== Overview ==
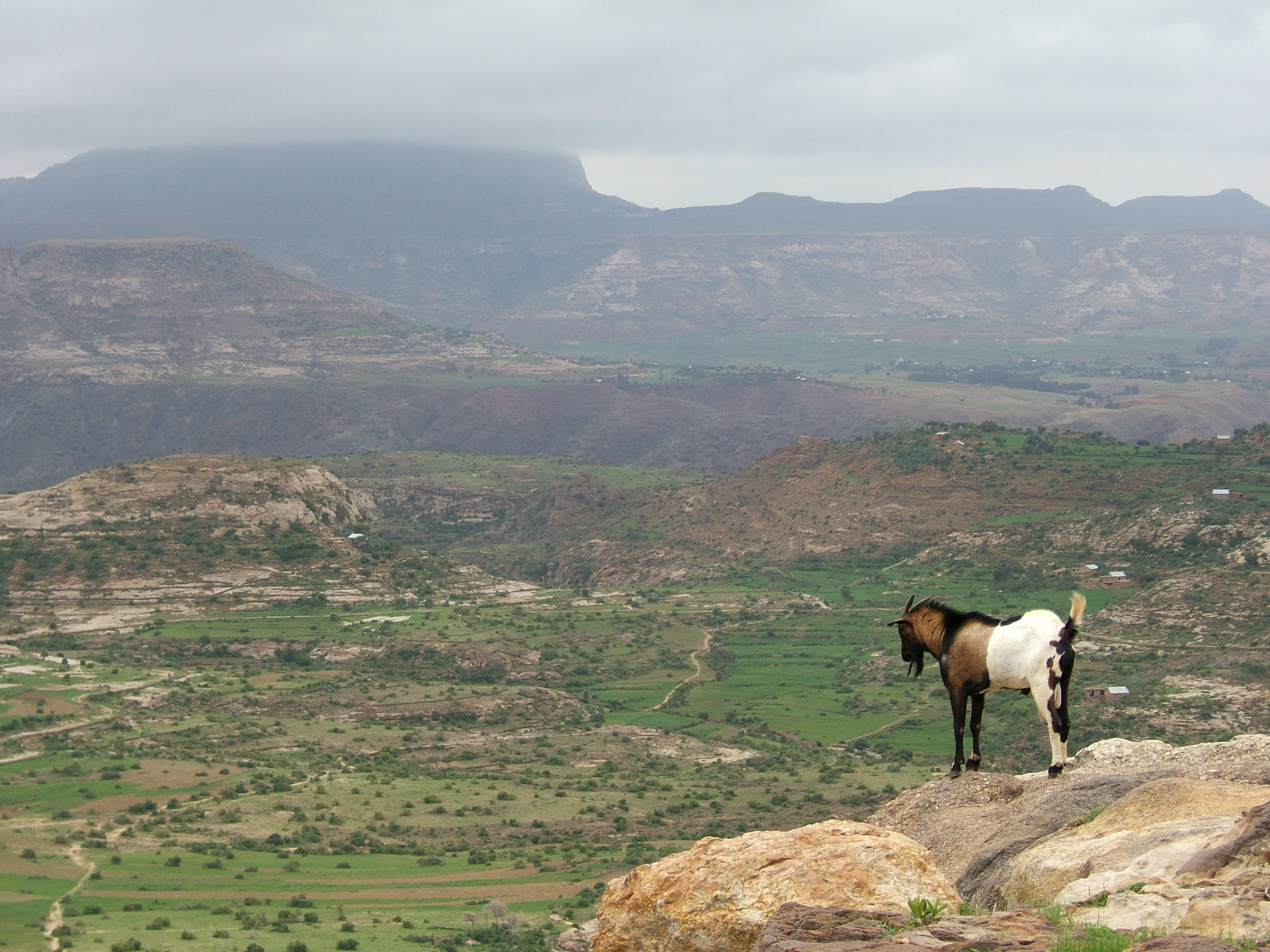
Ethiopian Highlands with Ras Dashan in the background

According to Erik Nilsson, Ras Dashen is the eastern peak of the rim of "an enormous volcano, the northern half of which is cut down about [a] thousand metres by numerous ravines, draining into the Takkazzi River." Its western counterpart is Mount Biuat (4,437 meters), separated by the valley of the Meshaha River. The mountain often sees violent snowfalls during the night, but given that day and night temperatures vary greatly, the snow is almost completely melted in a few hours (during the hottest period of the year), for the temperature may be over 5 degrees Celsius by midday. In winter snow falls normally, since the majority of Ethiopia's yearly rainfall is in the summer, but if it does it usually lasts for weeks or months.

The first recorded ascent by a European was in 1841, by French officers Ferret and Galinier. There is no verifiable evidence of earlier ascents by locals, but the summit climate and conditions are relatively hospitable, and there are nearby high-altitude pastoral settlements. A small fort is still partially standing at around 4,300 metre SRTM data.
