= Dodota =

District of Ethiopia

Coordinates: 8°15′N 39°20′E

Dodota is one of the woredas in the Oromia Region of Ethiopia. Part of the Arsi Zone it is located in the Great Rift Valley. It is part of the former Dodotana Sire woreda, which was divided for Dodota and Sire woredas. Dodotana Sire is bordered on the south by Tena, on the southwest by Hitosa, on the north by the Misraq Shewa Zone, on the east by Jeju, and on the southeast by Sude. The administrative center for the woreda is Dera; other towns include Awash Melkasa.

== Overview ==
The altitude of this woreda ranges from 1400 to 2500 meters above sea level. Rivers include 40 kilometers of the Awash, 32 of the Keleta, and 8 of the Agamsa. A survey of the land in this woreda shows that 23.2% is arable or cultivable, 10.6% pasture, 4.3% forest, and the remaining 42% is considered swampy, mountainous or otherwise unusable. A local landmark is the Dilfakar game preserve, named for a local Muslim leader whose tomb is in this woreda. Haricot bean, onions, garlic and linseed are important cash crops; Dodtona Sire produced 4.3% of the total amount of hides and skins in this Zone.

Industry in the woreda includes 4 edible oil mills, 35 grain mills and one brick factory employing 177 people, as well as 777 registered traders of whom 22.9% were wholesalers 50.7% retailers and 26.4% service providers. There were 26 Farmers Associations with 15,581 members and 16 Farmers Service Cooperatives with an unknown number of members. Dodotana Sire has 85 kilometers of dry-weather and 51 of all-weather road, for an average road density of 129.9 kilometers per 1000 square kilometers; 25.5 kilometers of road connecting Dera and Amude is reported under construction. About 35.2% of the total population has access to drinking water.

== History ==
The woreda is the site of the 1883 Battle of Dodota. Wheat and barley were introduced to the area when Emperor Menelik settled his soldiers there. These settlers land and started to plough and plant these grains. The local people imitated their farming system and began to produce these crops. However, the fact these soldiers came as landlords to Arsi, and the dislike of the Arsi Oromo for this new sedentary life, led to conflicts between the two. Interviews with local elders reveal that in 1912 Lenjiso Diga organized his fellow Oromos to attack the newcomers. They fought a battle at a place called Kedida that lasted 2 days. The soldiers won, and afterwards the representative of the government came to the area and is said to have made peace between the two groups.

Until the early 1970s the inhabitants of Dodotana Sire, being Arsi Oromo, were in chronic conflict with Karayu pastoralists from Fentale, as well as with Jille Oromos from in the neighboring woreda, over rights to grazing land and drinking water for livestock. This conflict was settled during the early 1990s by emphasizing overall ethnic affiliation over minor clan differences.

Inhabitants of this woreda were affected by the 1984-1985 famine, which forced them to sell off their cattle.

== Demographics ==
The 2007 national census reported a total population for this woreda of 64,310, of whom 32,378 were men and 31,932 were women; 19,130 or 29.75% of its population were urban dwellers. The majority of the inhabitants said they were Muslim, with 59.88% of the population reporting they observed this belief, while 36.59% of the population practised Ethiopian Orthodox Christianity.

Based on figures published by the Central Statistical Agency in 2005, this woreda has an estimated total population of 156,189, of whom 76,985 are men and 79,204 are women; 34,663 or 22.19% of its population are urban dwellers, which is greater than the Zone average of 12.3%. With an estimated area of 1,047.50 square kilometers, Dodotana Sire has an estimated population density of 149.1 people per square kilometer, which is greater than the Zone average of 132.2.

The 1994 national census reported a total population for this woreda 107,846, of whom 54,719 were men and 53,127 women; 19,383 or 17.97% of its population were urban dwellers at the time. The two largest ethnic groups reported in Dodotana Sire were Oromo (75.43%), and Amhara (22.22%); all other ethnic groups made up 2.35% of the population. Oromiffa was spoken as a first language by 67.83%, and 31.55% spoke Amharic; the remaining 0.62% spoke all other primary languages reported. The majority of the inhabitants professed Ethiopian Orthodox Christianity, with 50.85% of the population reporting they practiced that belief, while 48.6% of the population said they were Muslim, and 0.95% were Protestant.
