= Chilalo Agricultural Development Union =

Chilalo Agricultural Development Union (CADU) is the first comprehensive package project established in Arsi Zone, Oromia Region, Ethiopia, to modernize traditional subsistence agriculture. The major components of the package programmes include fertilizers, ameliorated seeds, farm credits, marketing facilities, better tools and implements, and improved storage facilities.

Encouraged by the successes experienced with India's Integrated Agricultural Development Project (IADP) and Bangladesh's Integrated Rural Development Program (Comilla), the Swedish International Development Agency (SIDA) agreed with the Ethiopian government to start a similar project, and began CADU in 1967. The program included research, extension, marketing aspects and credit and input supply schemes for smallholders. Its main impact was to show that significant increases in cereal yields were feasible through the use of fertilizer. Farmer extension services were an integral part of CADU's activities. Other similar projects were started in later years, but it was realized that implementing them throughout the whole country would not be feasible because of the high manpower needs and costs involved. Currently the project which was initiated by CADU is part of the Arsi Rural Development Unit (ARDU).
