= Mount Gugu =

Mountain in Ethiopia

Mount Gugu is a mountain in central Ethiopia. Located in the Arsi Zone of the Oromia Region, it has a latitude and longitude of 8°12′N 39°58′E, with an elevation of 3623 meters. It forms part of the divide between the drainage basins of the Awash and the Shebelle rivers.
