= Katar River =

River in Ethiopia

Katar River Ketar

Location
- Country: Ethiopia
- Region: Oromia
- Zone: Arsi

Physical characteristics
- Source: Ethiopian Highlands
  - location: Encuolo Mountain
  - coordinates: 7°22′37″N 39°21′33″E
  - elevation: 3,667 m (12,031 ft)
- Mouth: Lake Ziway
  - coordinates: 8°2′2.04″N 38°56′29.972″E
  - elevation: 1,643 m (5,390 ft)
- Length: 113 km (70 mi)
- Basin size: 3,398 km^{2} (1,312 sq mi)
- Discharge
  - location: Mouth
  - average: 23.6 m^{3}/s (830 cu ft/s)
  - minimum: 6.82 m^{3}/s (241 cu ft/s)
  - maximum: 74.6 m^{3}/s (2,630 cu ft/s)

Basin features
- River system: Katar Basin
- Cities: Ogolcho
- Population: 1,220,000

Katar River is a river of central Ethiopia. It arises from the glaciated slopes of Mount Kaka and Mount Badda in the Arsi Zone. The Katar's tributaries include the Gonde. The gradient of the river is generally steep, and areas suitable for irrigation are few in number and very limited in extent. With a watershed of 3,398 km^{2}, the Katar drains into Lake Ziway. It is the largest river draining into Lake Ziway.

== See also ==
- List of Ethiopian rivers
