= Arsi Zone =

Zone in Oromia Region of Ethiopia

Coordinates: 7°45′N 39°30′E

A map of the regions and zones of Ethiopia

Arsi (Oromo: Godina Arsii) is a zone in Oromia Region of Ethiopia, named after a clan of the Oromo, who inhabit in the area.

Arsi is bordered on the south by Bale Zone, on the southwest by the West Arsi Zone, on the northwest by East Shewa Zone, on the north by the Afar Region and on the east by West Hararghe Zone. It covers an area of 19,825.22 km^{2}, divided into 25 districts (weredas). The population was officially estimated at 3,894,248 in mid 2022. The highest point in Arsi Zone is Mount Chilalo; other notable mountains in this zone include Mount Kaka and Mount Gugu. Arsi Mountains National Park was created in 2011 to protect a section of the mountains. The administrative centre of this zone is in Asela, with an estimated 139,537 inhabitants in mid 2022; other towns in this zone (with estimated populations in mid 2022) include Bokoji (36,805) in Limuna Bilbilo District, Robe (31,445) in Robe District, Etaya (31,094) in Hitosa District, Dera (30,676) in Dodota District, Abomsa (30,377) in Merti District, Hurta (27,523) in Lude Hitosa District, Sagure (24,932) in Digeluna Tijo District, and Kersa (23,313) in Munesa District. Some districts in the southwestern part of this zone were separated from Arsi Zone to create a new West Arsi Zone.

In 2014, a monument has been erected to remember the victims.

== Economy ==
Coffee has been a major cash crop in Arsi as early as 1912, when two Belgian companies were granted concessions of 1,464 hectares of land for cultivating coffee in the area of the current Zone. After World War I, these companies encountered financial difficulties and merged, and harvested as much as 613 tons of coffee at their peak (1931-21). The Central Statistical Agency (CSA), reported that 2198 tons of coffee were produced in this zone in the year ending in 2005, based on inspection records from the Ethiopian Coffee and Tea authority. This represents 1.9% of the Region's output and 0.97% of Ethiopia's total output. Arsi University was established in 2014 at Asella.

== Demographics ==
Based on the 2007 Census conducted by the CSA, this Zone has a total population of 2,637,657, of whom 1,323,424 are men and 1,314,233 women; with an area of 19,825.22 square kilometres, Arsi has a population density of 133.05. While 305,701 or 11.59% are urban inhabitants, a further 7,098 or 0.27% are pastoralists. A total of 541,959 households were counted in this Zone, which results in an average of 4.87 persons to a household, and 523,342 housing units. The two largest ethnic groups reported were the Oromo (84.15%) and the Amhara (14.3%); all other ethnic groups made up 1.55% of the population. Oromiffa was spoken as a first language by 81.38% and Amharic was spoken by 17.76%; the remaining 0.86% spoke all other primary languages reported. The majority of the inhabitants were Muslim, with 58.1% of the population having reported they practised that belief, while 40.01% of the population professed Ethiopian Orthodox Christianity and 1.43% of the population professed Protestantism. The official estimate of population for this zone was 3,894,248 as at mid 2022, of which 1,944,164 were male and 1,950,084 were female; the population density was 196.4 per km^{2}.

The 1994 national census reported a total population for this Zone of 2,217,245 in 438,561 households, of whom 1,105,439 were men and 1,111,806 women; 216,413 or 9.76% of its population were urban dwellers at the time. The two largest ethnic groups reported in Arsi were the Oromo (82.93%), and the Amhara (15.38%); all other ethnic groups made up 1.69% of the population. Oromiffa was spoken as a first language by 80.01%, and 19.19% spoke Amharic; the remaining 0.8% spoke all other primary languages reported. The majority of the inhabitants were Muslim, with 59.33% of the population having reported they practised that belief, while 39.95% of the population said they professed Ethiopian Orthodox Christianity.

According to a May 24, 2004 World Bank memorandum, 4% of the inhabitants of Arsi have access to electricity, this zone has a road density of 45.0 kilometres per 1000 square kilometres (compared to the national average of 30 kilometres), the average rural household has 1.2 hectare of land (compared to the national average of 1.01 hectare of land and an average of 1.14 for the Oromia Region) and the equivalent of 1.1 heads of livestock. 16.5% of the population is in non-farm related jobs, compared to the national average of 25% and a Regional average of 24%. Concerning education, 84% of all eligible children are enrolled in primary school, and 22% in secondary schools. 17% of the zone is exposed to malaria, and none to Tsetse fly. The memorandum gave this zone a drought risk rating of 364.
