= Abijatta-Shalla National Park =

National park in Oromia Region, Ethiopia

- IUCN category II (national park)
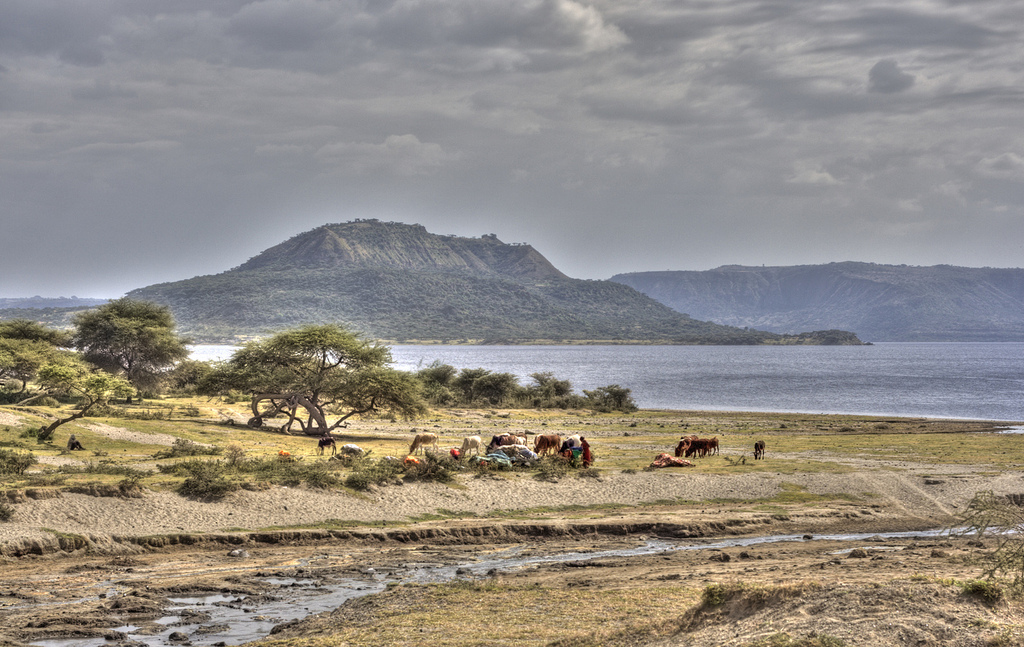
- Lake Shalla shoreline

- Location within Ethiopia
- Location: Ethiopia
- Nearest city: Shashamane
- Coordinates: 7°30′N 38°30′E
- Area: 887 km^{2} (342 sq mi)
- Established: 1974
- Governing body: Ethiopian Wildlife Conservation Authority

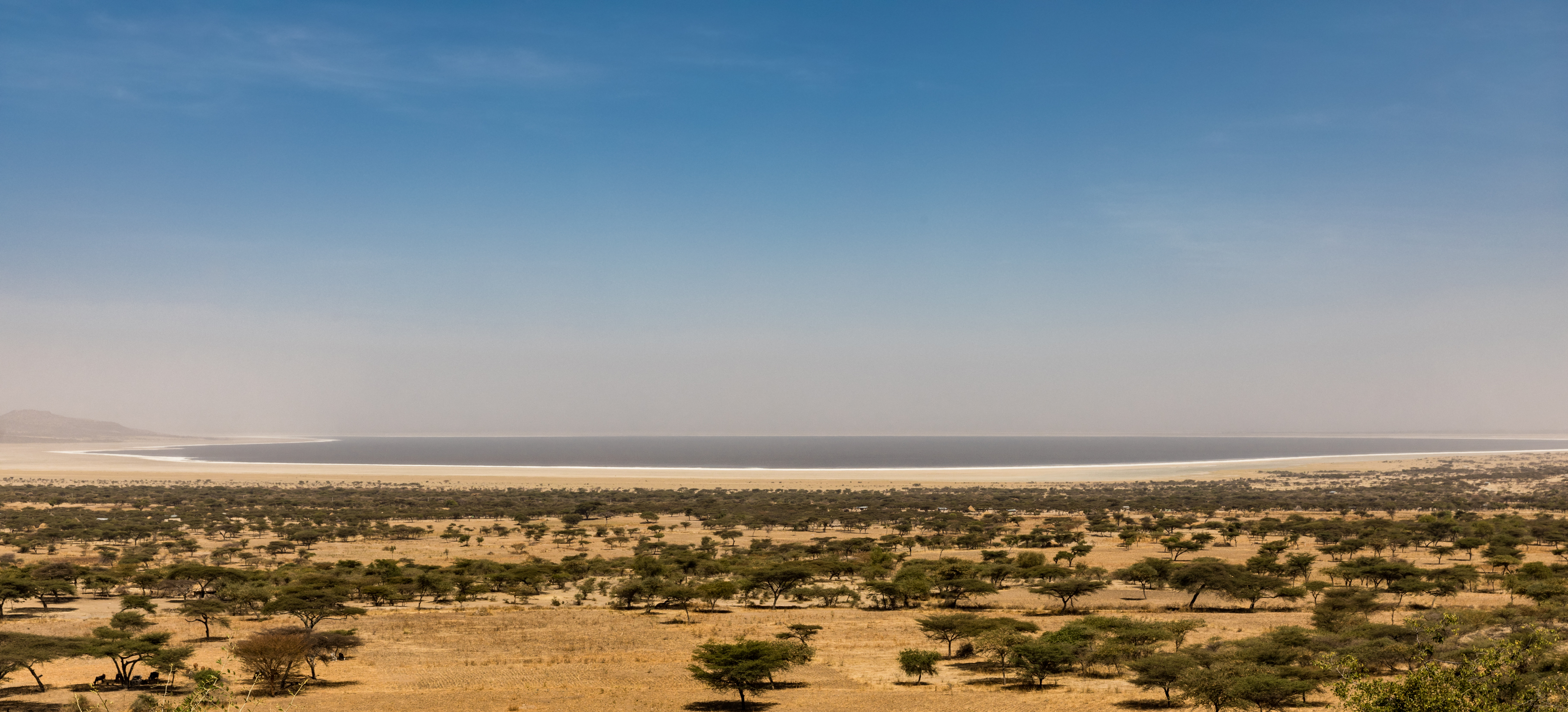
Lake Abijatta

Abijatta-Shalla National Park is a national park in Ethiopia. It is located in the Oromia Region and the Ethiopian Highlands region, 200 kilometers south of Addis Ababa, and east of the Batu–Shashamane highway.

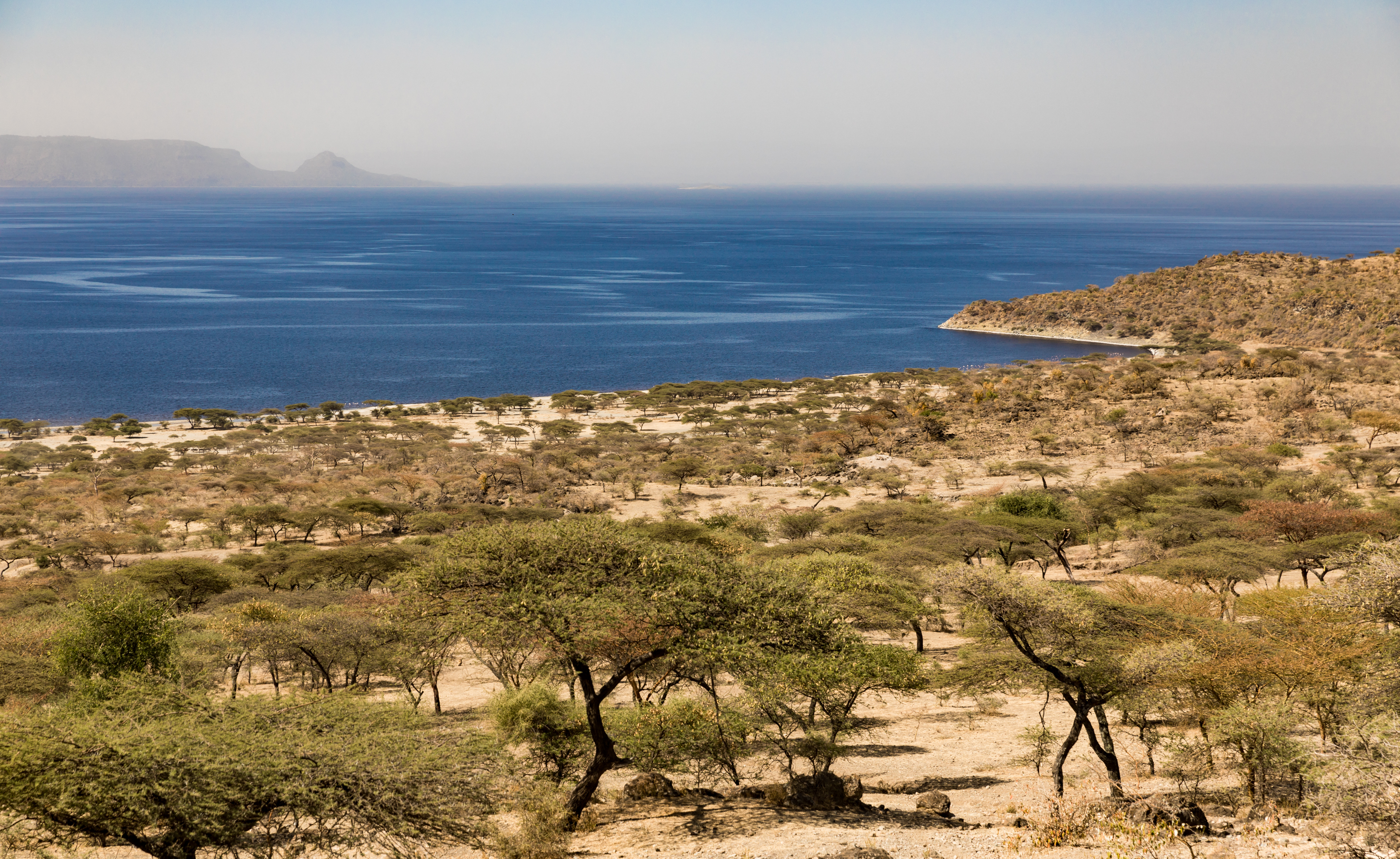
Lake Shala

== Geography ==
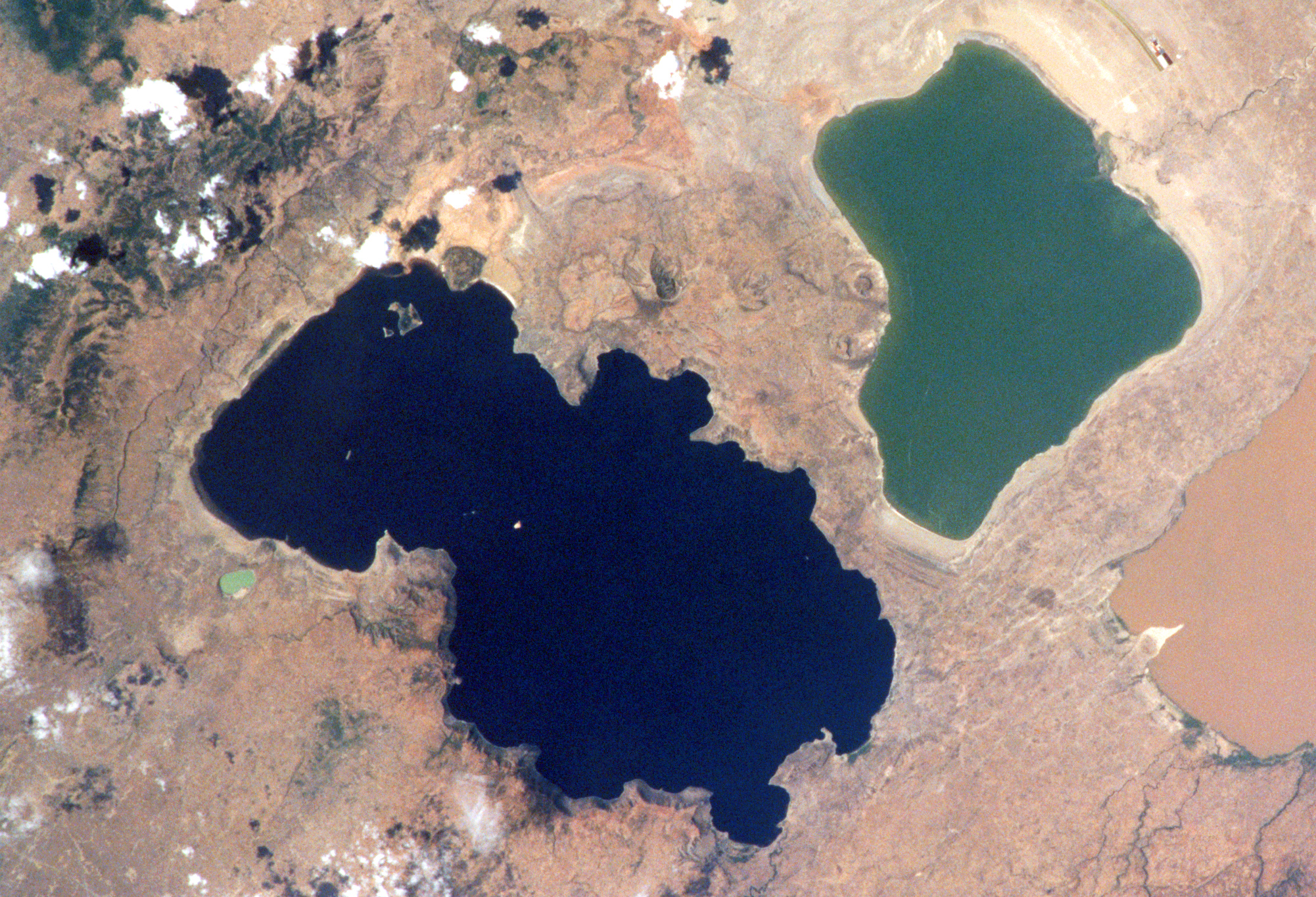
Satellite view of Abijatta and Shala

It contains 887 square kilometers including the Rift Valley lakes of Abijatta and Shalla. The two lakes are separated by three kilometers of hilly land. The altitude of the park ranges from 1540 to 2075 meters, the highest peak being Mount Fike, which is situated between the two lakes. Abijatta-Shalla National Park has six main attractions: viewpoints, bird-watching, and photography. Abijatta and Shalla are two alkaline lakes that were formed during the volcanic activities of O'a Caldera and rare earthquakes. Besides the two lakes, the primary attraction of this national park is a number of hot springs on the northeast corner of Lake Abijatta, and large numbers of flamingoes on the lake. Care must be exercised in driving vehicles out to the edge of this lake, as the thin crust of dried mud on the surface can give way without warning. Rich hot springs are also found on Shalla's southwest and eastern shores. Mount Fike is located between two lakes, befitting for trekking and viewpoint of three lakes, including Langano. Lake Chitu, a small blue-green saline lake, is found south of Lake Shalla which was covered in Blue-green algae.

== Wildlife ==
=== Flora ===
The habitat of Abijatta-Shalla National Park contains open grasslands, dry savannas, arid shrublands, and deciduous woodland that were dominated by Acacia trees, which include umbrella thorn acacias, red acacias, gum acacias, Acacia etibicas, Egyptian balsams or Bedenas, and sycamore figs.

=== Fauna ===
==== Mammals ====
Abijatta-Shalla National Park is home to 76 species of mammals which includes Grant's gazelles, bohor reedbucks, oribis, common warthogs, greater kudus, caracals, honey badgers, colobus monkeys, aardvarks, spotted hyenas, klipspringers, porcupines, olive baboons, and black-backed jackals. Other species that were abundant in Abijatta-Shalla National Park, such as lions, giraffes, waterbucks, buffalos, and Swayne's hartebeests, were locally extirpated due to hunting or possibly habitat loss.

Other mammalian species that are endemic to this park include Scott's hairy bat (Myotis scotti), white-toothed shrew (Crocidura phaeura), Mahomet mouse (Mus mahomet), Ethiopian white-footed mouse (Stenocephalemys albipes), Abyssinian grass rat (Arvicanthis abyssinicus), and Harrington's rat (Desmomys harringtoni).

==== Avifauna ====
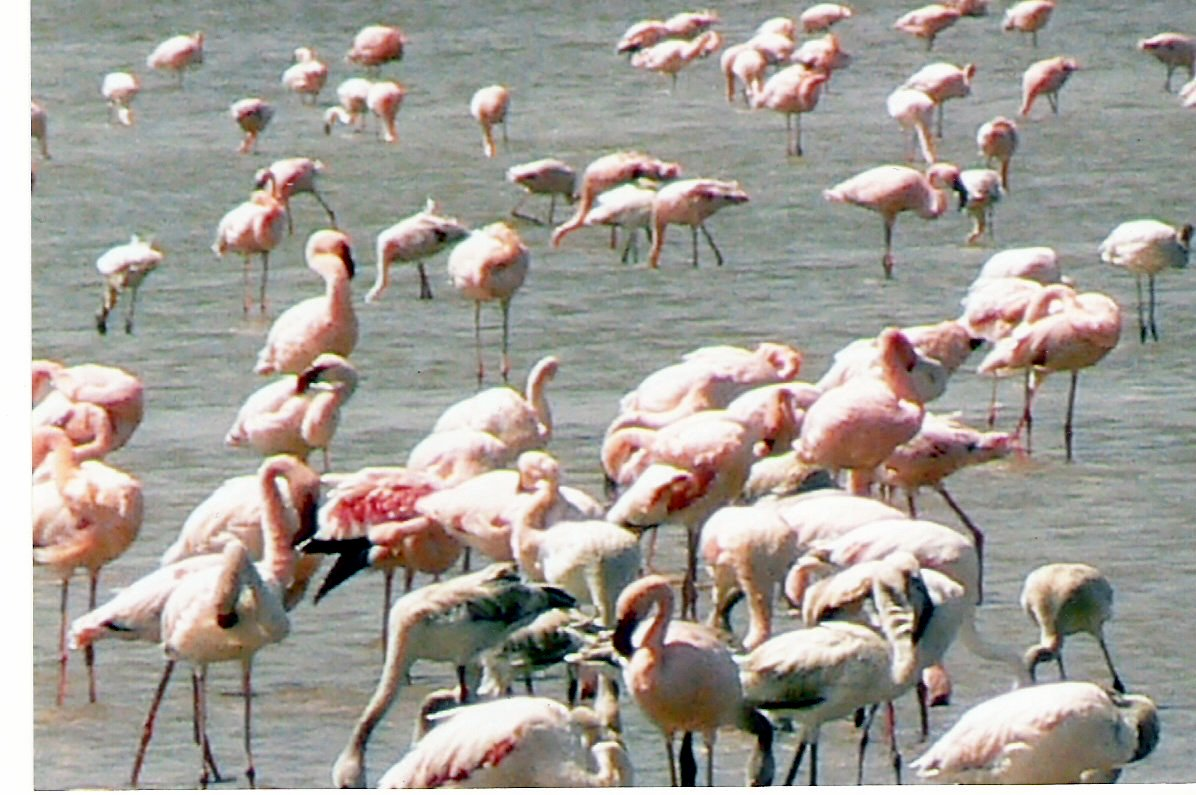
Flamingoes on Lake Abiyatta

The park is also home to 300 species of birds that are listed as endemics, residents, and migratory. Common Ostriches and Somali Ostriches are mostly common for their breeding. Two species of flamingos commonly thrived on Abijatta, Lake Chitu, and Shalla for algae-feeding and breeding areas: greater flamingoes and lesser flamingoes. Great white pelicans only settled on Lake Shalla which also serves as both a breeding site and a feeding ground along with several species of storks, herons, egrets, plovers, and cormorants. Other bird species such as parrots, ducks, eagles, owls, hornbills, barbets, bee-eaters, and pigeons are also flourish within these scrublands. Wattled ibis and yellow-fronted parrot are the only know endemic species known in Ethiopia. Black-winged lovebird, white-winged cliff chat, and white-billed starling are near-endemic species found within the park's habitat.

== Conservation ==
Although its intent was to protect wildlife, few wild animals currently can be viewed there. During the tumultuous period of the last days of the Derg regime, and for some time afterward, large numbers of nomads took advantage of weakened central authority to move into the Park and set up residence with their livestock. Much of the Acacia woodland surrounding Lake Abijatta has been cut down for charcoal. Currently, small groups not only continue to fall Acacia trees, but they also go as far as to remove the salty soil from the lake shoreline and sell it.

A recent visitor noted that while viable breeding populations of greater kudu, Grant's gazelle, black-backed jackal, and spotted hyena may exist, he saw no evidence of their presence. Although baboons are still quite common, they were outnumbered by the livestock introduced by cattle herders. A few Grant's gazelle and several ostriches were kept in a fenced enclosure near the gatehouse. Nevertheless, more than 300 bird species have been recorded in Abijatta-Shalla or the remnants of the adjacent park-like woodland. Reportedly, rehabilitation of this National Park had begun in 1996, and plans for active integration of local communities in its future planning and development had been announced.

== See also ==
- List of national parks of Ethiopia
- Geography of Oromia
