= Geography of Oromia =

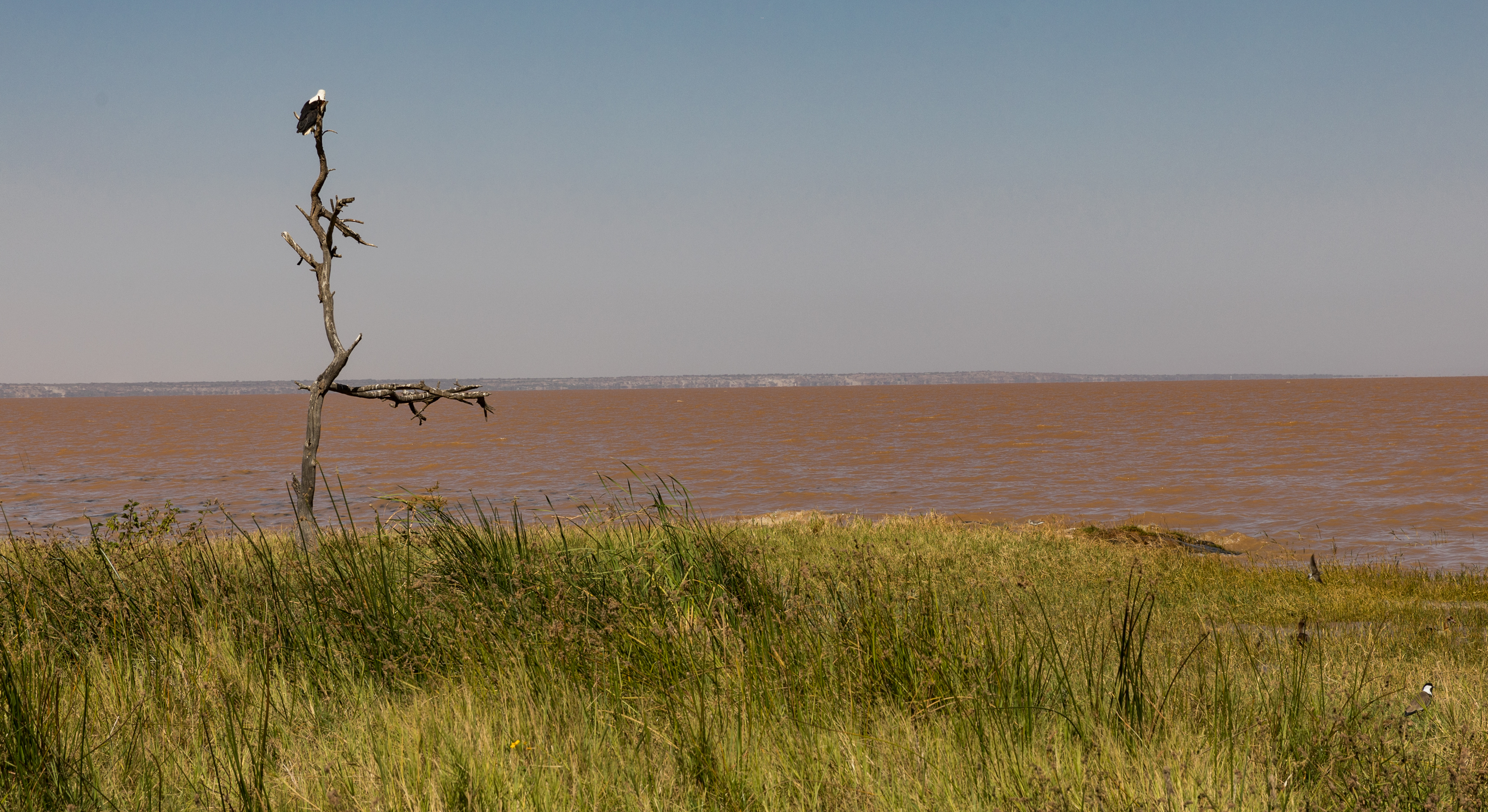
Hara Langano Lodge, Oromia, Ethiopia

The geography of Oromia Region, the largest regional state of Ethiopia, is highly diverse. Occupying 353,690 square kilometers, it is bordered by Somalia, to the east, Afar Region to the north, Djibouti to the north-east, Kenya, to the south, Amhara Region to the north, Benishangul-Gumuz to the north-west, Sudan to the north-west, Gambela to the west, and South Sudan to the west. The region is situated between 2° and 12°N, 34° and 44°E with varied landscape ranging from rugged mountain ranges in the center and the north, to flat grassland to the south-east.

Oromia has a varied climate grouped into three categories: dry climate, tropical rainy climate and temperate rainy climate. The mean annual rainfall of 410–820 mm varies noticeably from year to year. The region has enormous lakes and rivers: the Awash River is the largest and used as a source of electric power. Lakes including Bishoftu, Kuriftu and Ziway are the basis for agro-industrial and fishery production.

National parks include Awash and Bale Mountains National Park, which host more than 100 wild animals and about 800 bird species.

== Geographical features ==
=== Landform ===
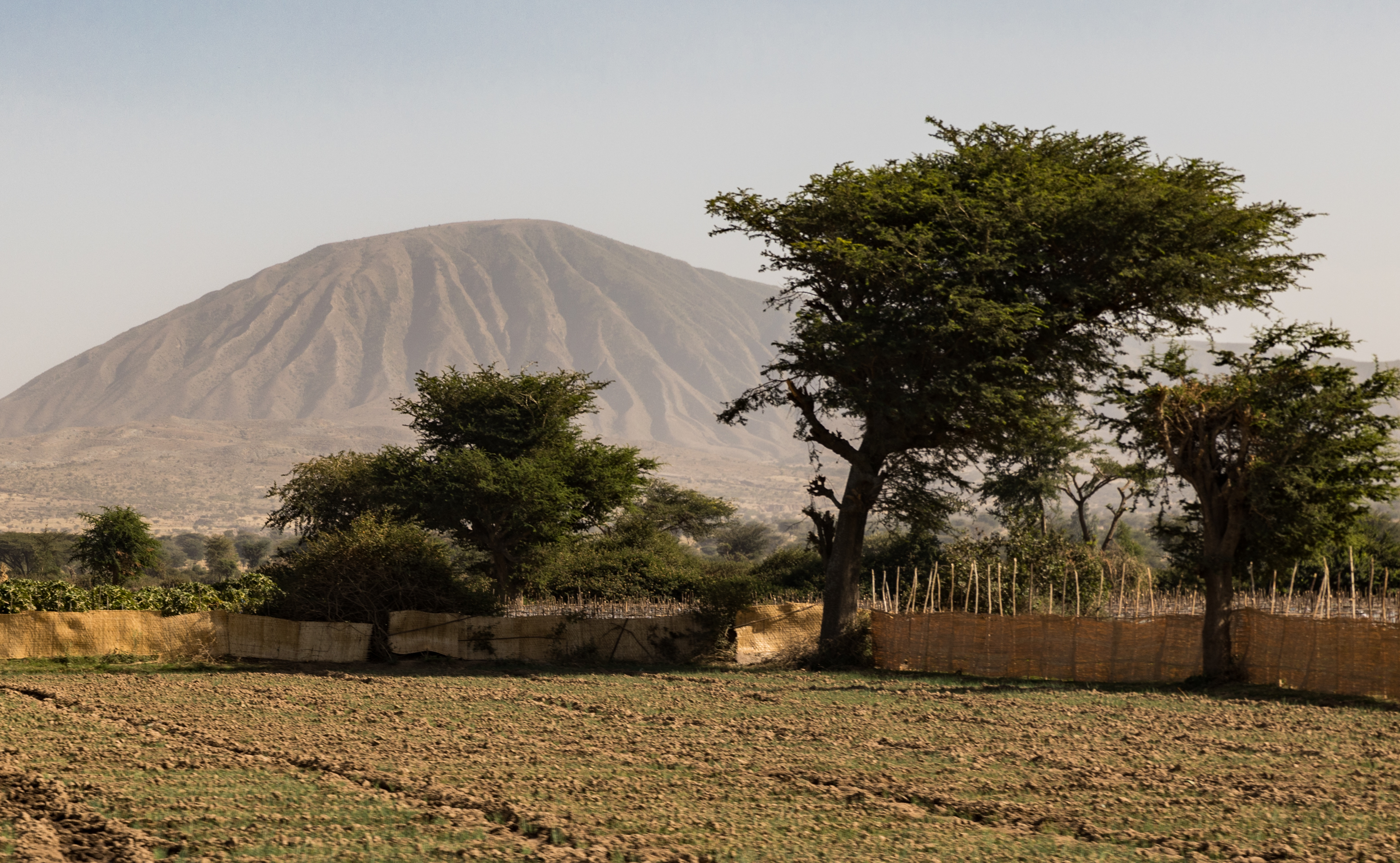
Mountain in Oromia Region

Occupying 353,690 square kilometres (136,560 sq mi) Oromia Region is bordered by Somalia, to the east, Afar Region to the north, Djibouti to north-east, Kenya, to the south, Amhara Region to the north, Benishangul-Gumuz to the north-west, Sudan to the north-west, Gambela to the west, and South Sudan to the west. It is located between 2° and 12°N, 34° and 44°E and the landscape varied from rugged mountain ranges in the center and the north, to flat grassland to the south-east. Its territories integrated by Western Welega to the eastern parts of eastern Hararghe from 34°E latitude to 43°E and its southworth expanse runs from 4 2/3° N to 10 2/3°N latitude. Thus, Oromia is the largest regional state by area.

In topography and climate, Oromia is diverse with sharp contrasts noted for the mod portion of the region formed by the Great Rift Valley system that divides the regional state roughly into a western third and eastern tow-thirds. Major features include mountain ranges, undulating plateaus, panoramic gorges, deep incised river valleys and rolling plains. The region situated in 500 meters above sea level and Mount Batu is the largest peak in the region. Oromia features varied reliefs and climates, having fertile and rich natural resources.

Oromia integrated to the high and extensive Afro-Arabian plateau formed from continued uplift, rifting and subsequent volcanic piles. High relief of over 1,500m is dominant.

=== Climate ===
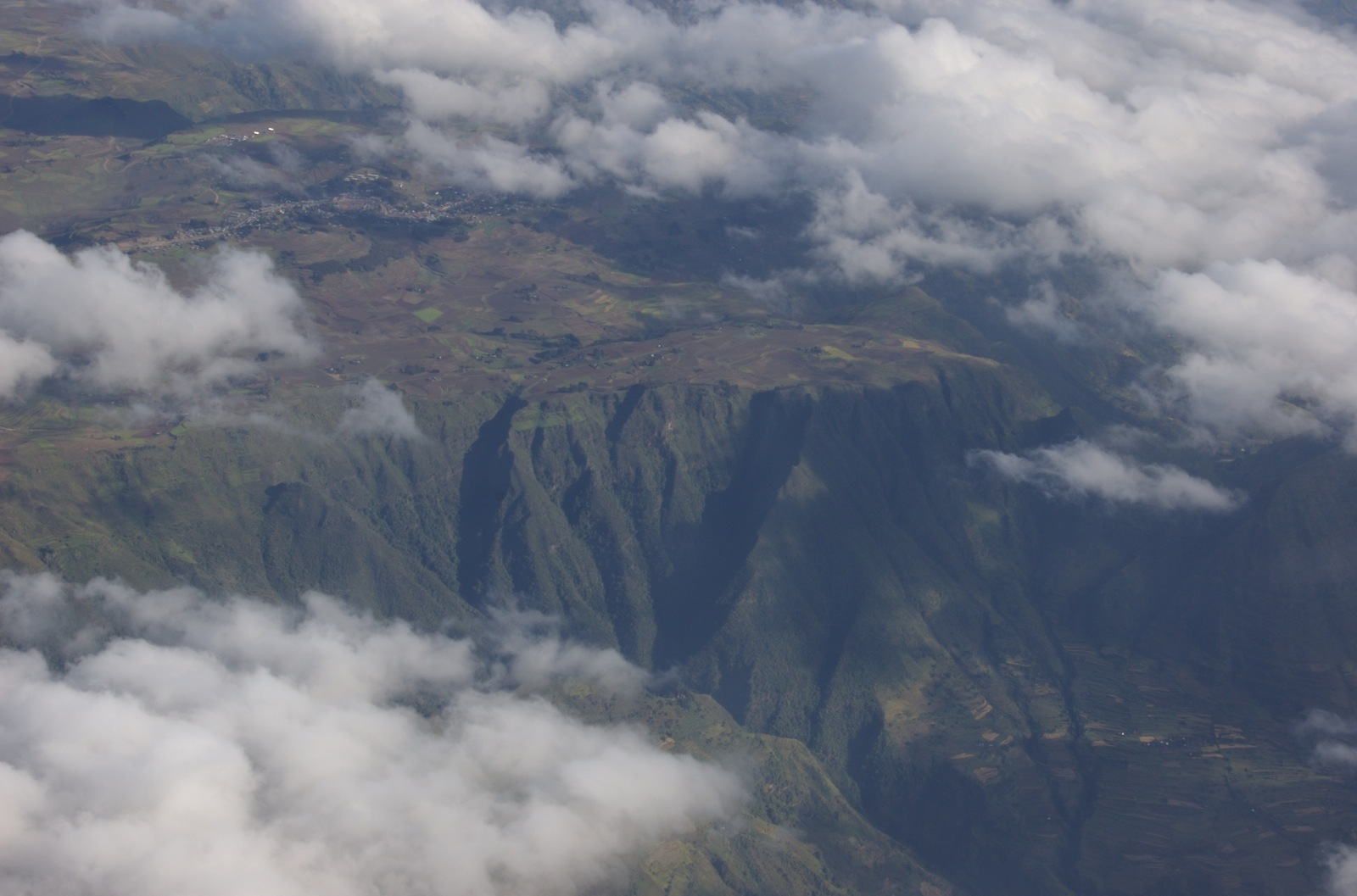
Great Rift Valley from an Ethiopian Airlines Fokker turboprop en route from Addis Ababa to Dire Dawa in southeastern Ethiopia

The climate types of the Oromia Region grouped into three major categories: the dry climate, tropical rainy climate and temperate rainy climate. The dry climate is characterized by poor sparse vegetation with annual mean temperature of 27 °C to 39 °C and the mean amount of rainfall reaches less than 450mm. The hot semi-arid climate mean annual temperature varies between 18 °C and 27 °C. It has a mean annual rainfall of 410–820 mm with noticeable variability from year to year.

The highland zone of the region experiences temperate climate of moderate temperature with mean annual temperature of the coolest month is less than 18 °C and ample precipitation (12,00–2,000mm).

=== Water bodies ===
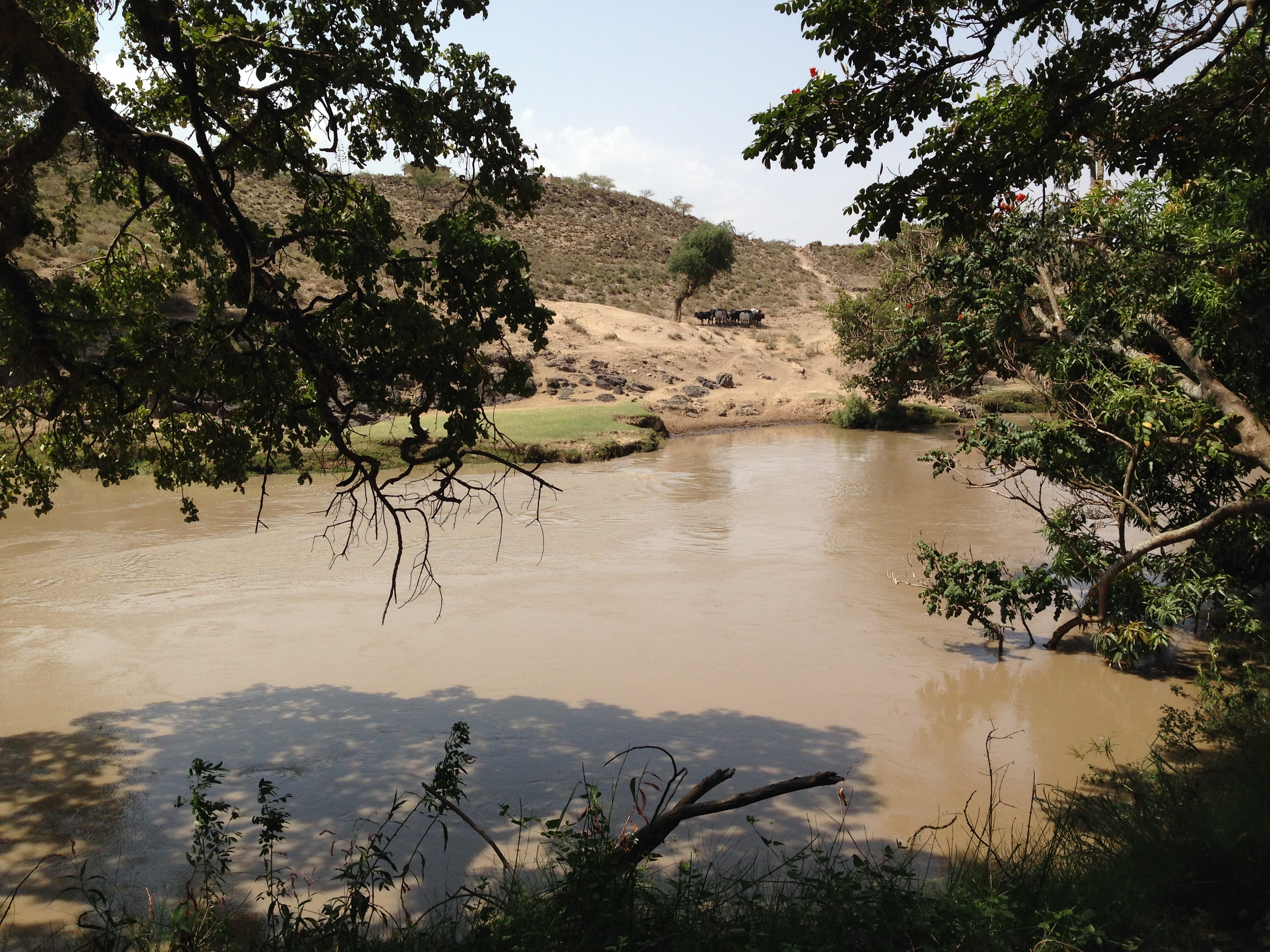
Awash River at Sodere, Ethiopia

From rivers, Awash, Wabe-Shebelle, Genale, Gibe, Baro and Didessa and Guder are major rivers in the region. Awash River is the longest river in Ethiopia and source of agro-industrial and hydroelectric power. Lakes such as Green, Bishoftu, Kuriftu, Bishoftu-Gudo, Hora Arsedi, and the rift valley lakes Ziway, Abijatta, Shala, and Langano are the largest in the region. They are noted for profound recreational and fishery development.

=== Bird species ===
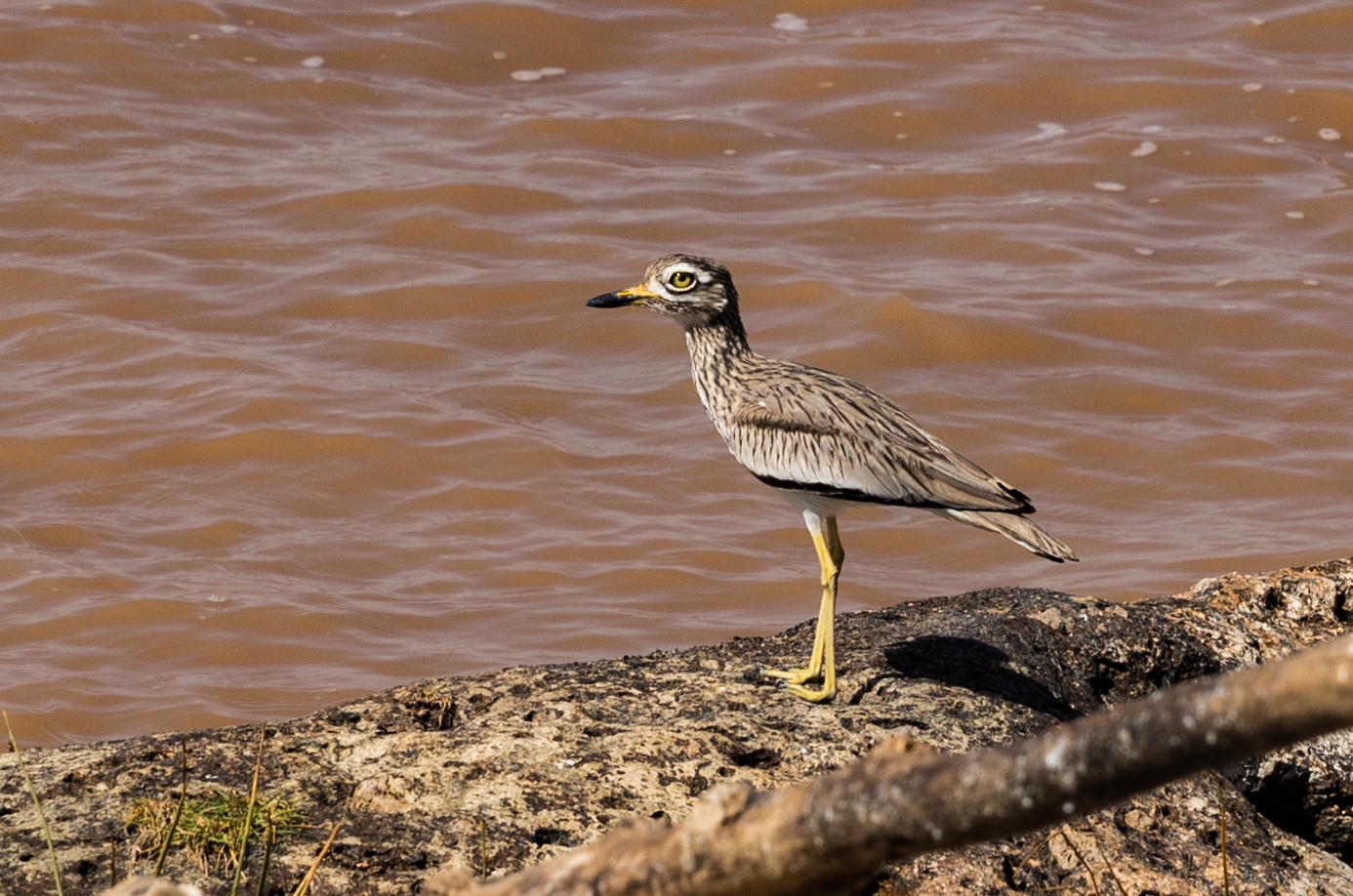
Water thick-knee at Hara Langano

There are around 800 bird species and more than 100 wild animals in the region. Endemic wild animals such as mountain Nyala, the Semien Red fox, and Menelik bushbuck inhabit the Bale Mountain National Park.

=== National parks ===
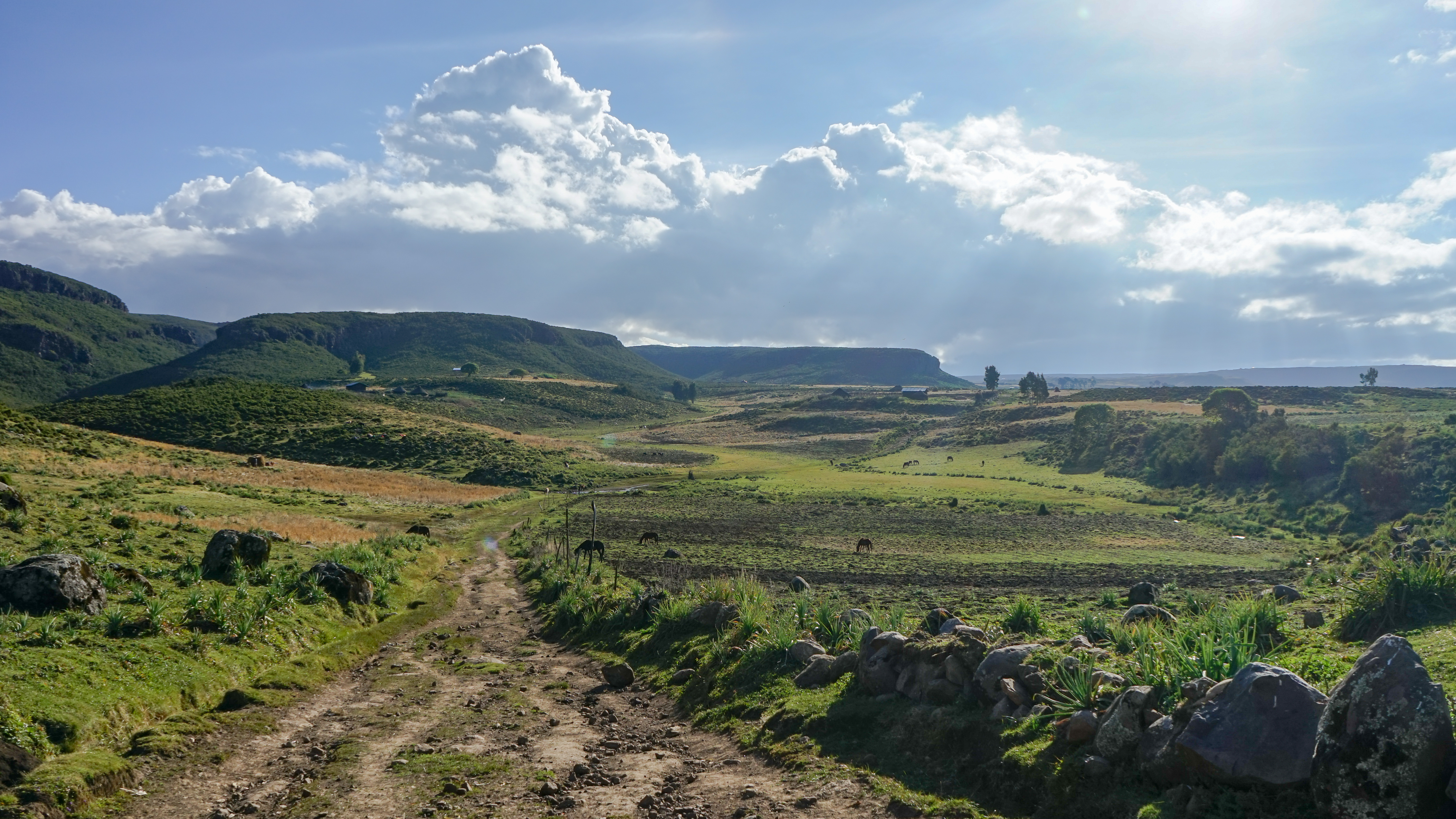
Vegetations in Bale Mountains National Park

Awash and Bale National Parks are the largest in the region. The Awash consisted most of East African plain games except giraffe and buffalo. It is home to the oryx, kudu, cararcal, aardvark, colobus monkey, green monkeys, baboons, leopards, klipspringers, hippopotamuses, seemering's gazelle, grevy's zebra and cheetah. It has also wide range of bird species including limburger l, wattle crane, angur buzzard, verreaux eagle, long eared owls, water fowls, shore birds and the colorful ruddy shelled duck as well as the endemic blue-winged goose are common in the marshy areas of the park.

== Human factors ==
Oromia was inhabited by many kingdoms until large-scale settlements were made by Oromos in their migration to the northern highlands in 1550s. The period saw Oromo expansion into south-eastern, central, western, and northern regions of Ethiopia, and much of present-day Somalia and Kenya. In 1968, malaria was originated from Oromia Region which was confirmed caused by geographical setting with elevation of 1,600 and 2,500 above sea level from South East to North west of the region periphery.
