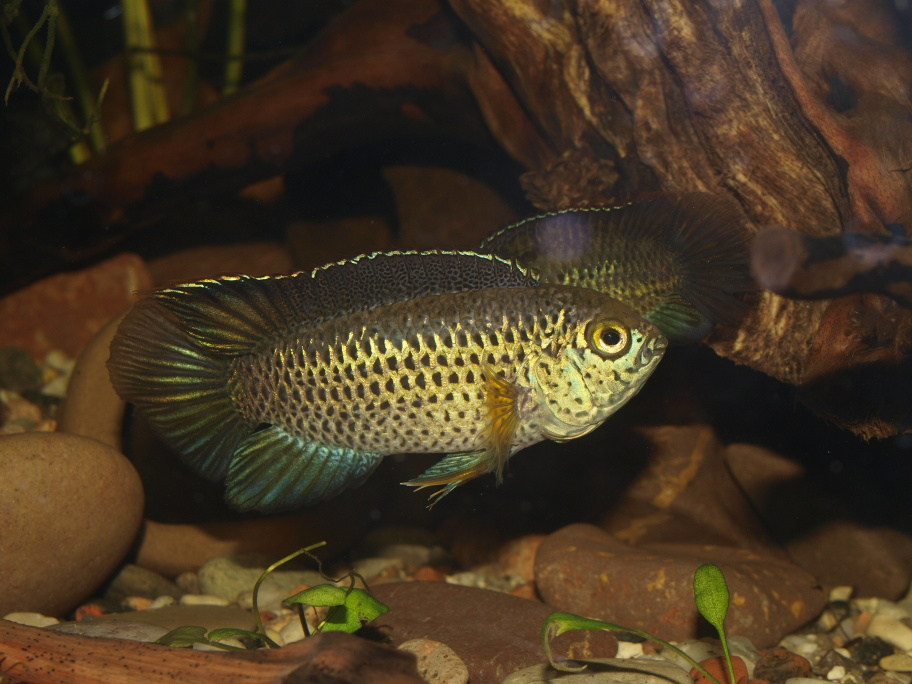
- Nannacara anomala

Scientific classification
- Domain: Eukaryota
- Kingdom: Animalia
- Phylum: Chordata
- Class: Actinopterygii
- Order: Cichliformes
- Family: Cichlidae
- Tribe: Cichlasomatini
- Genus: Nannacara; Regan, 1905

Type species
- Nannacara anomala Regan, 1905

= Nannacara =

Genus of fishes

Nannacara is a genus of small freshwater cichlid fish endemic to South America. The genus is part of the Cichlasomatini tribe of the Cichlasomatinae subfamily. In the aquarium hobby, the fish is considered a dwarf cichlid along with Apistogramma, Mikrogeophagus, and Dicrossus species. Nannacara anomala is the most commonly encountered species in the aquarium trade.

== Species ==
There are currently six recognized species in this genus:

- Nannacara adoketa S. O. Kullander & Preda-Pedreros, 1993 (Zebra acara)
- Nannacara anomala Regan, 1905 (Goldeneye cichlid)
- Nannacara aureocephalus Allgayer, 1983
- Nannacara bimaculata C. H. Eigenmann, 1912
- Nannacara quadrispinae Staeck & I. Schindler, 2004
- Nannacara taenia Regan, 1912

In a book published in 2006, Nannacara adoketa and Nannacara bimaculata were reassigned to the new genus Ivanacara. This change has not been recognized by FishBase, but it has been adopted by the Catalog of Fishes.
