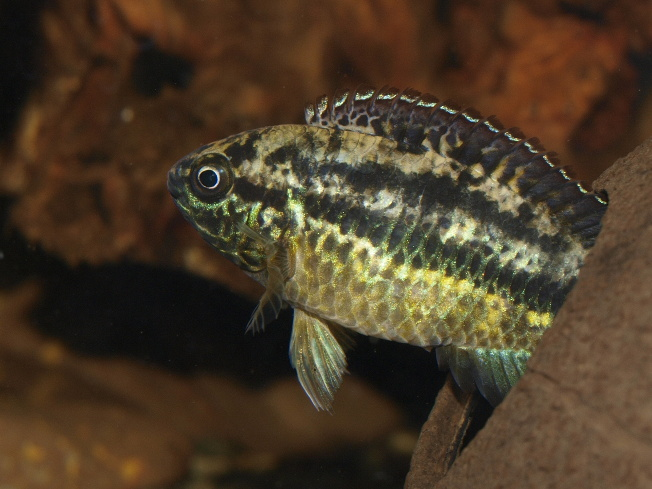
- A female
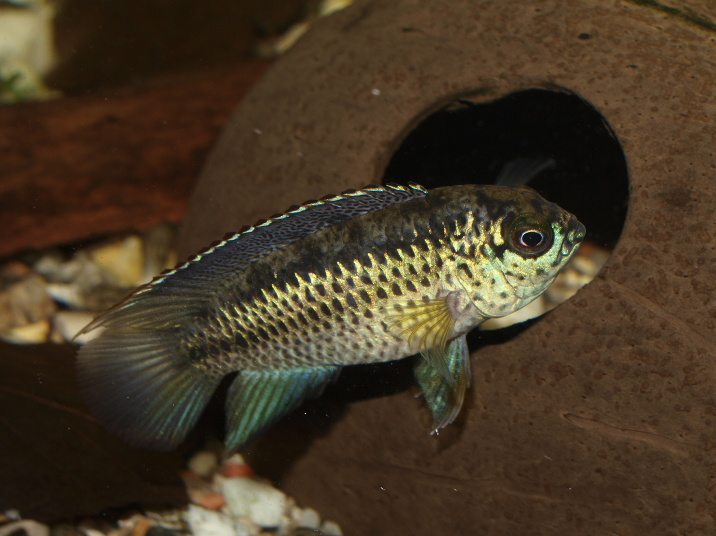
- A male

Conservation status
- Least Concern (IUCN 3.1)

Scientific classification
- Kingdom: Animalia
- Phylum: Chordata
- Class: Actinopterygii
- Order: Cichliformes
- Family: Cichlidae
- Genus: Nannacara
- Species: N. anomala

Binomial name
- Nannacara anomala Regan, 1905

= Goldeneye cichlid =

Species of fish

The goldeneye cichlid (Nannacara anomala) is a species of cichlid found in fresh water from the Aruka River in Guyana, to the Maroni River in Suriname. It is often found on flooded savannas near the coast. The male grows to a length of about 5.6 centimetres (2.2 in) while the female is somewhat smaller, and is thus regarded as a dwarf cichlid.

The male, under acidic conditions, adopts a greenish tinge along the length of its body, while the female puts on a black coat with a faint line running from her face to the middle of her tail, and in breeding condition, fades into a bright yellow in the stomach.

As youngsters, there is hardly any difference as a juvenile male does have the colouration of a female. The only difference would be the presence of an extension at the back of the male's dorsal fin.

The goldeneye cichlid lives on a diet of crustaceans, insects, and other small animals.

== Signaling and communication between competing males ==
In cichlids, males are larger and more colorful than females, and have elongated fins. These physical differences allow for signaling between males as they compete with each other for females that are ready to spawn. Through a specific sequence of displays, males communicate their fighting ability to each other, which allows opponents to assess whether the fight is worthwhile.

The specific order of displays follows a consistent pattern:

1. Contestants will orient laterally and erect their fins.
2. They beat their tails and push a stream of water at their opponents, taking turns to display and receive the stream.
3. The males begin to face each other and biting increases.
4. Contestants engage in mouth wrestling in which they will grip each other's jaws and push and pull in order to determine the other's strength.
5. Both fish end up swimming quickly in tight circles, each trying to bite the others' backs.
6. Finally, the losing fish will signal its surrender by folding its fins and changing its color as it retreats.

Sequential assessment game models show that an individual's decision to give up will be based on its fighting ability. Competitions between individuals of similar size will proceed to the later phases of the behavioral sequence, while those contests with a large size asymmetry should be expected to end earlier in the sequence. Thus, fights may end at different phases along in the sequence, with short fights only involving low-intensity behaviors. As fights escalate, the risk to the opponents increases, as later phases in the display process involve more dangerous behavioral elements.

The fish cooperate in behaviors such as tail beating and mouth wrestling in order to properly assess the relative fighting ability of opponents. This cooperative behavior allows for a form of communication between contesting fish, possibly as a means of decreasing the possibility for escalation.

=== Coloration and visual assessment ===
Cichlids may use coloration as a means of transmitting information to opponents in order to signal cooperative behaviors. The ability to display color is not indicative of size or fighting ability, and is an option available to all individuals. Color displays can indicate an aggressive state in cichlids, but can also be used to signal specific agonistic behaviors within a fight, such as a display of medial lines indicating tail-beating behavior. Coordinating displays, which are facilitated by coloration as a signal, may decrease the costs of fighting for both individuals by avoiding fight escalation.

Visual assessment of ability also plays a role during male cichlid fights, although precision is quite low. Visual assessment can only be made when there is a large discrepancy between the sizes of competing individuals.

=== Presence of a predator ===
It is possible to see changes in the way competing cichlids communicate with one another when they are in the presence of a predator. In highly escalated behaviors such as mouth wrestling, vigilance is greatly reduced. In the presence of a predator, opponents may prefer to engage in low-intensity behaviors, such as lateral display and tail beating, even after the fight has escalated. This allows the individuals to maintain a higher level of vigilance while attempting to reduce the overall danger to themselves.
