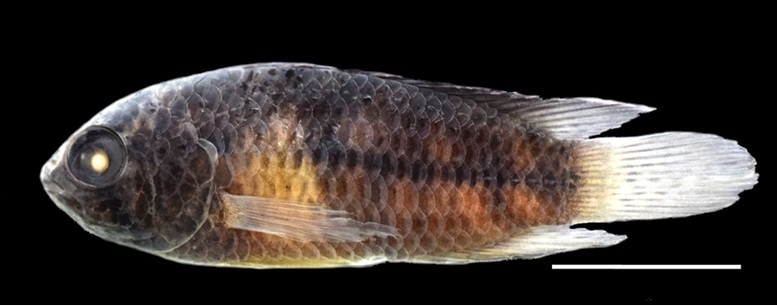

Conservation status
- Least Concern (IUCN 3.1)

Scientific classification
- Kingdom: Animalia
- Phylum: Chordata
- Class: Actinopterygii
- Order: Cichliformes
- Family: Cichlidae
- Genus: Nannacara
- Species: N. aureocephalus

Binomial name
- Nannacara aureocephalus Allgayer, 1983

Synonyms
- Pelvicachromis aureocephalus (Allgayer, 1983)

= Nannacara aureocephalus =

Species of fish

Nannacara aureocephalus is a species of cichlid endemic to French Guiana in South America where it occurs in the Approuague River basin. Its habitat is shallow water near the edges of swamps, and areas of stagnant water in forest creeks. It is considered a dwarf cichlid and can be found in the aquarium trade. The male reaches a length of 6.7 centimetres (2.6 in) SL while the females reach a length of 5 centimetres (2.0 in) TL.
