= Ts'emi'e =

Ts’emi’e ጸምዕ
- Province
- Location within Ethiopia
- Coordinates: 14°31′N 39°47′E

Ethnicity

Languages

Ts’emi’e is a historical region towards the foot of the Rift Valley escarpment in Ethiopia and Eritrea.

The name literally means "thirsty area" or "dry place" in the Tigrinya language.

It appears on indigenous maps of the northern Horn of Africa in the 15th century.
