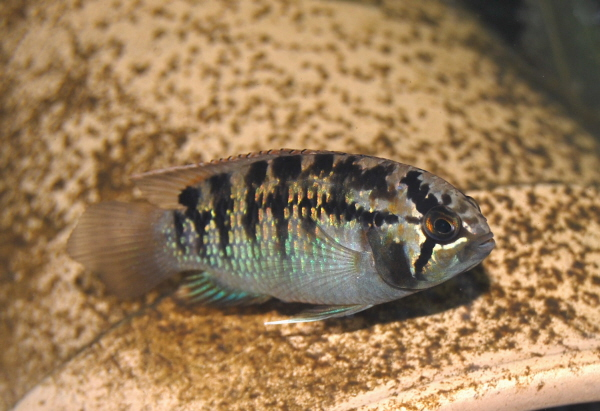
- Ivanacara adoketa

Scientific classification
- Kingdom: Animalia
- Phylum: Chordata
- Class: Actinopterygii
- Order: Cichliformes
- Family: Cichlidae
- Subfamily: Cichlinae
- Tribe: Cichlasomatini
- Genus: Ivanacara; Römer & Hahn, 2006

Type species
- Ivanacara adoketa Kullander & Prada-Pedreros, 1993

= Ivanacara =

Genus of fishes

Ivanacara are a genus of cichlid fishes from tropical South America. This genus was identified as a new in 2006, but many authorities do not recognize it and maintain its species in Nannacara.

== Species ==
- Ivanacara adoketa (Kullander & Preda-Pedreros, 1993) – Zebra acara
- Ivanacara bimaculata (C. H. Eigenmann, 1912)

Nannacara adoketa and Nannacara bimaculata were reassigned to the new genus Ivanacara. This change has not been recognized by FishBase, but it has been adopted by the Catalog of Fishes.
