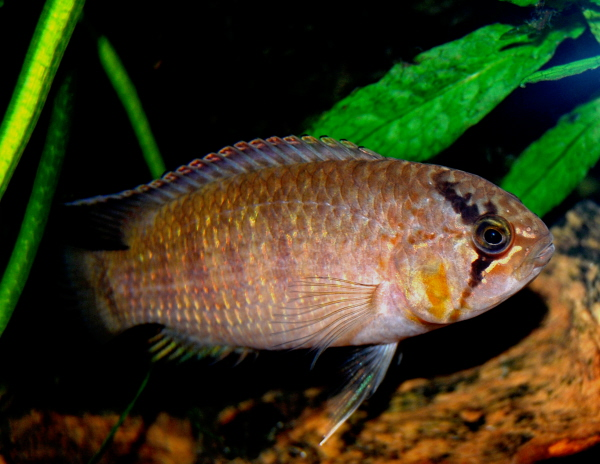
- Male specimen. Photo: Birger A
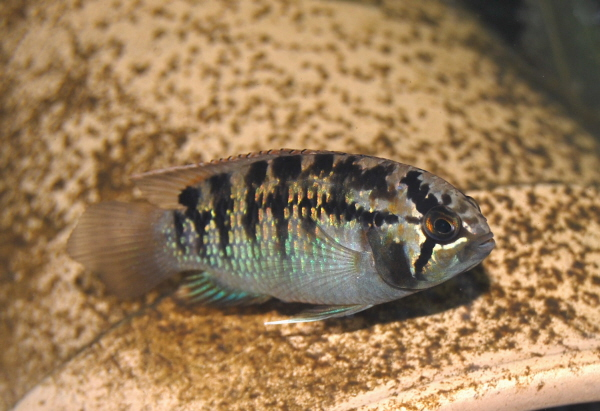
- Female specimen. Photo: Birger A

Conservation status
- Least Concern (IUCN 3.1)

Scientific classification
- Kingdom: Animalia
- Phylum: Chordata
- Class: Actinopterygii
- Order: Cichliformes
- Family: Cichlidae
- Genus: Ivanacara
- Species: I. adoketa

Binomial name
- Ivanacara adoketa (Kullander & Preda-Pedreros, 1993)

Synonyms
- Nannacara adoketa Kullander & Preda-Pedreros, 1993

= Zebra acara =

Species of fish

The Zebra acara (Ivanacara adoketa) is a species of cichlid from Rio Uaupes and Rio Preto, two side rivers of Rio Negro in Brazil. This species can reach a length of 10 centimetres (3.9 in) TL. This species prefers a pH between 4.5 and 6.0, and a temperature between 22 and 28 °C (72 and 82 °F).

== Taxonomy ==
adoketa was formally in the genus Nannacara
