= Nannacara quadrispinae =

Conservation status
- Least Concern (IUCN 3.1)

Scientific classification
- Kingdom: Animalia
- Phylum: Chordata
- Class: Actinopterygii
- Order: Cichliformes
- Family: Cichlidae
- Genus: Nannacara
- Species: N. quadrispinae

Binomial name
- Nannacara quadrispinae Staeck & I. Schindler, 2004

Species of fish

Nannacara quadrispinae is a species of cichlid endemic to Venezuela where it is found in the Orinoco delta. It went by the trade name Nannacara sp. Venezuela in the ornamental fish market prior to its formal description. This species can also be found in the aquarium trade.
