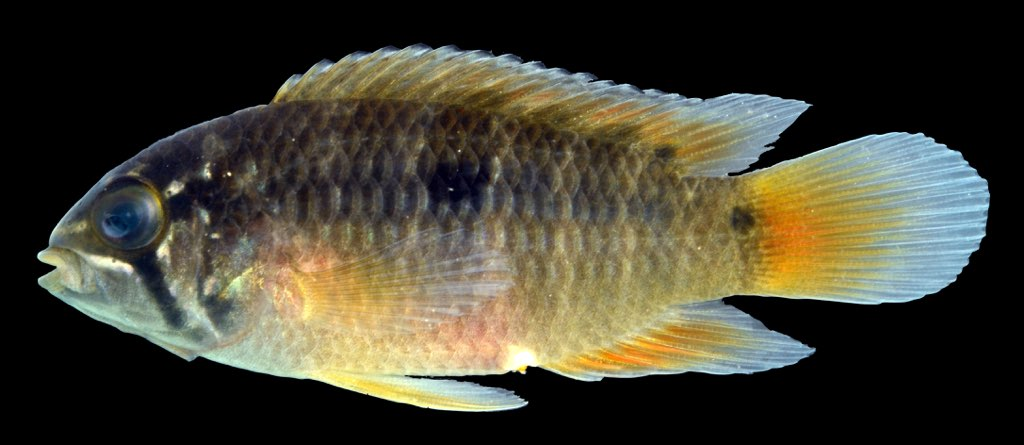
- Ivanacara bimaculata

Conservation status
- Vulnerable (IUCN 3.1)

Scientific classification
- Kingdom: Animalia
- Phylum: Chordata
- Class: Actinopterygii
- Order: Cichliformes
- Family: Cichlidae
- Genus: Ivanacara
- Species: I. bimaculata

Binomial name
- Ivanacara bimaculata (C. H. Eigenmann, 1912)

Synonyms
- Nannacara bimaculata C. H. Eigenmann, 1912

= Nannacara bimaculata =

Species of fish

Ivanacara bimaculata is a species of cichlid endemic to Guyana where it is found in the Potaro and Essequibo rivers. It grows to a length of 4.5 centimetres (1.8 in) SL. This species can also be found in the aquarium trade.

== Taxonomy ==
Prior to reclassification by Römer and Hahn, I. bimaculata was considered a member of genus Nannacara.
