= Nannacara taenia =

Conservation status
- Least Concern (IUCN 3.1)

Scientific classification
- Kingdom: Animalia
- Phylum: Chordata
- Class: Actinopterygii
- Order: Cichliformes
- Family: Cichlidae
- Genus: Nannacara
- Species: N. taenia

Binomial name
- Nannacara taenia Regan, 1912

Species of fish

Nannacara taenia is a species of cichlid found near Belém in Brazil in South America. This species grows to a length of 5 centimetres (2.0 in) SL.
