= Lake Langano =

Lake in Oromia Region, Ethiopia

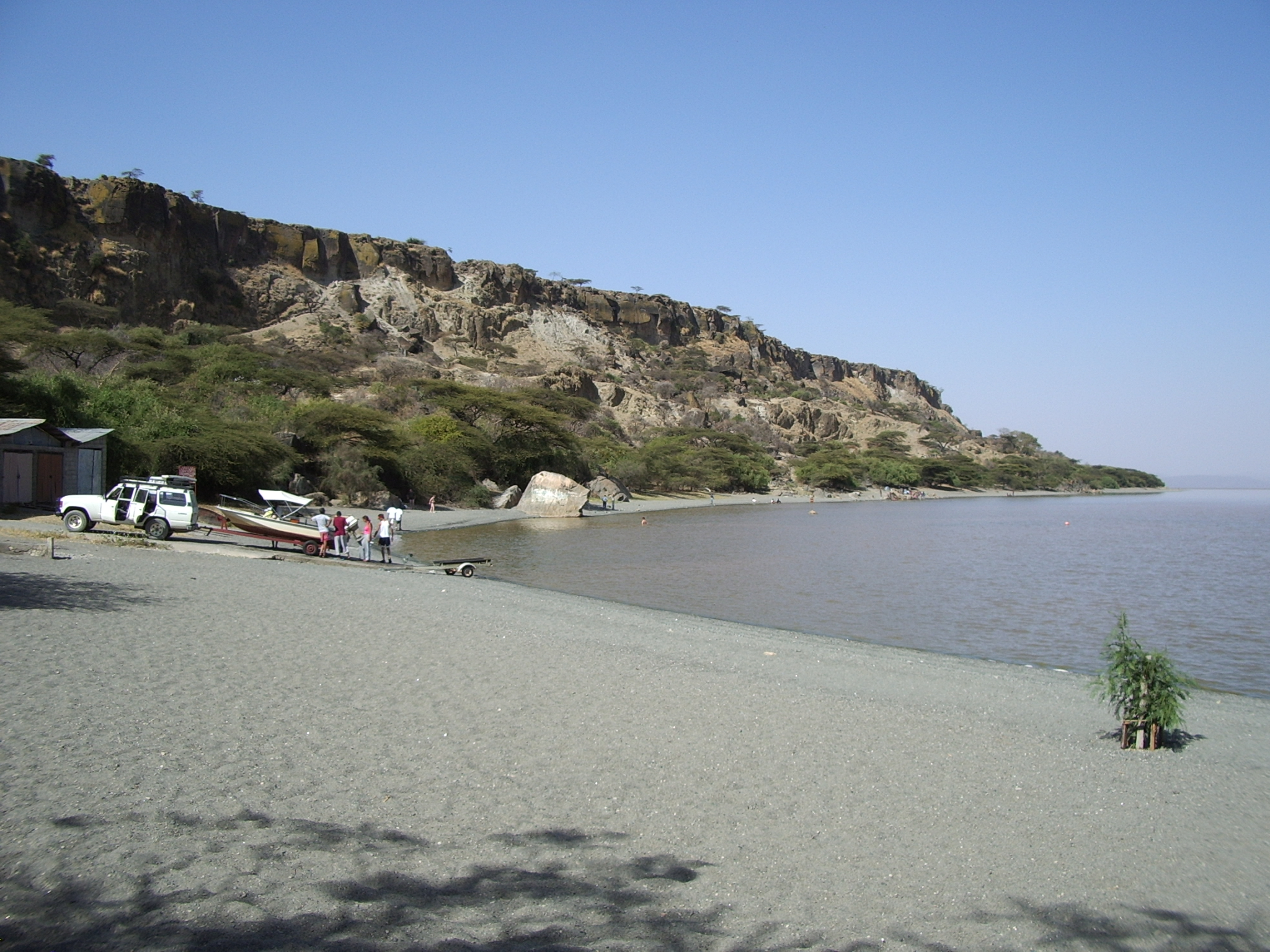

- Location within Ethiopia

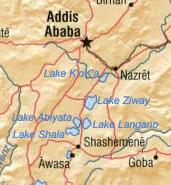
- Coordinates: 7°36′N 38°43′E
- Basin countries: Ethiopia
- Max. length: 18 km (11 mi)
- Max. width: 16 km (9.9 mi)
- Surface area: 230 km^{2} (89 sq mi)
- Max. depth: 46 m (151 ft)
- Surface elevation: 1,585 m (5,200 ft)

Lake Langano (Oromo: Hora Langaanoo, Amharic: ላንጋኖ ሐይቅ) is a lake in the Oromia Region of Ethiopia, exactly 200 kilometers by road south of the capital, Addis Ababa, on the border between the East Shewa Zone and Arsi Zones. It is located to the east of Lake Abijatta in the Main Ethiopian Rift at an elevation of 1,585 meters.

== Overview ==
Sunrise over Lake Langano.

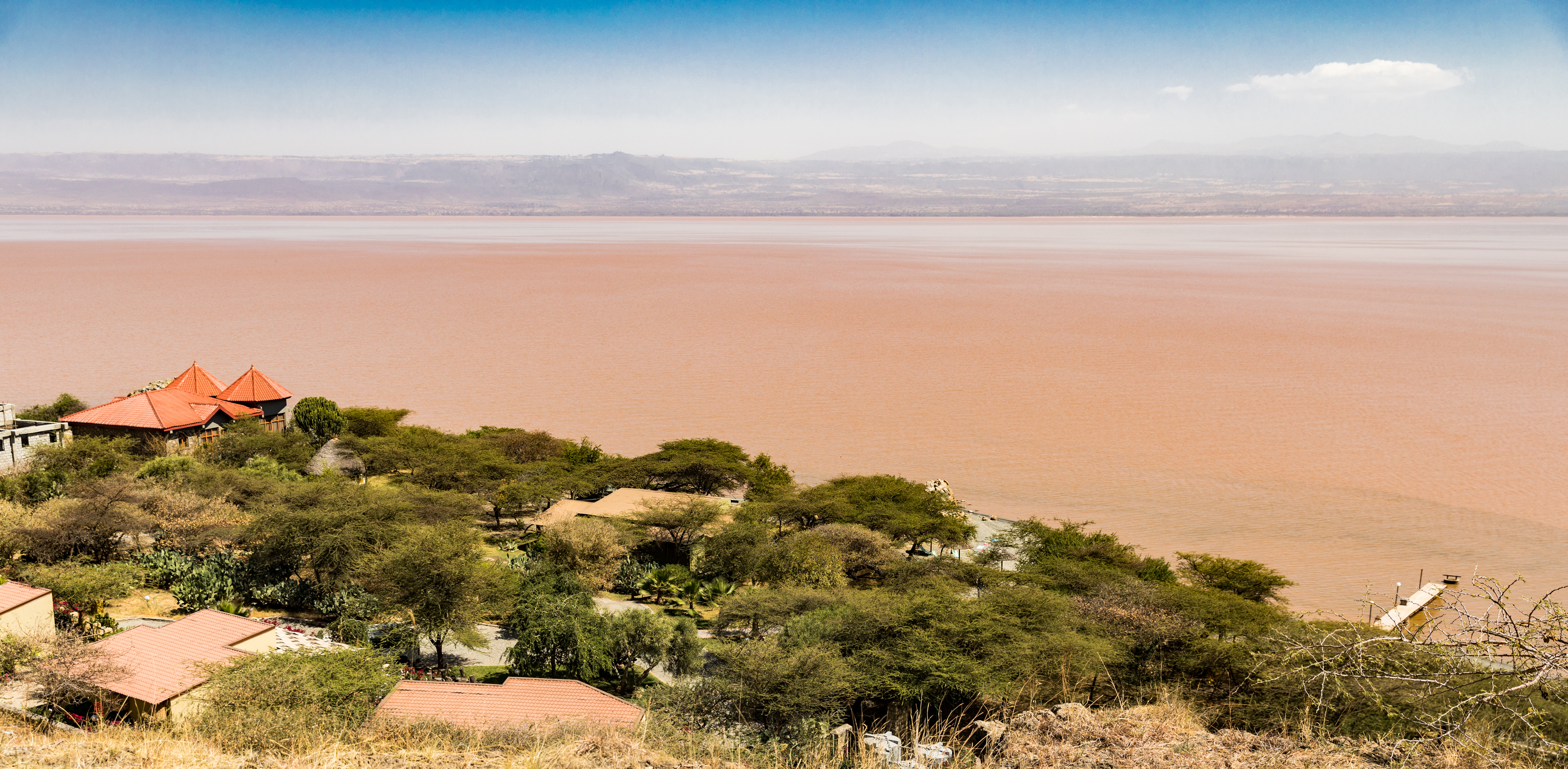
Lake Langano

According to figures published by the Central Statistical Agency, Lake Langano is 18 kilometers long and 16 km wide, with a surface area of 230 square kilometers and a maximum depth of 46 meters. The lake's catchment area is 1,600 square kilometers in size, and is drained by the Hora Kallo river which empties into the adjacent Lake Abijatta.

As it is free of Bilharzia (schistosomiasis), unlike all other freshwater lakes in Ethiopia, Lake Langano is popular with tourists and city-dwellers. The lake is brown in colour and at first sight one may think that the lake is not clean. However this is not the case, the reason for the colour is due to the richness of minerals including high sulphur levels which have led many to believe that the lake water has healing properties. There are a number of resorts around the lake and water sports are popular. There is a variety of wildlife around the lake, which include hippos (rare), monkeys, baboons, warthogs, and a huge variety of birds. The area around the lake is largely deforested, however, and a large number of herders live around the area.

Two earthquakes had their epicenter near this lake, the first in 1906 (a magnitude 6.8 on the Richter scale), and the second in 1985 (magnitude 6.2). After the earthquake of 1906 there formed a 25–30 m tall geyser on Edo Laki Island on the northern part of the lake. The geyser disappeared circa 1966 – 1970, leaving a hot spring.

== Climate ==
Climate data for Lake Langano, elevation 1,600 m (5,200 ft)
Month	Jan	Feb	Mar	Apr	May	Jun	Jul	Aug	Sep	Oct	Nov	Dec	Year
Mean daily maximum °C (°F)	26.3 (79.3)	27.2 (81.0)	28.5 (83.3)	28.7 (83.7)	27.2 (81.0)	26.6 (79.9)	24.6 (76.3)	25.7 (78.3)	26.0 (78.8)	26.5 (79.7)	26.2 (79.2)	25.8 (78.4)	26.6 (79.9)
Daily mean °C (°F)	20.0 (68.0)	19.8 (67.6)	20.7 (69.3)	21.7 (71.1)	21.2 (70.2)	20.7 (69.3)	19.6 (67.3)	20.1 (68.2)	20.1 (68.2)	19.6 (67.3)	18.7 (65.7)	18.2 (64.8)	20.0 (68.1)
Mean daily minimum °C (°F)	13.6 (56.5)	12.5 (54.5)	13.1 (55.6)	14.8 (58.6)	15.1 (59.2)	14.8 (58.6)	14.5 (58.1)	14.5 (58.1)	14.1 (57.4)	12.6 (54.7)	11.1 (52.0)	10.6 (51.1)	13.4 (56.2)
Average precipitation mm (inches)	25 (1.0)	12 (0.5)	35 (1.4)	26 (1.0)	53 (2.1)	87 (3.4)	113 (4.4)	75 (3.0)	58 (2.3)	13 (0.5)	8 (0.3)	5 (0.2)	510 (20.1)
Average relative humidity (%)	50	48	50	58	62	64	68	67	68	65	60	54	60
Source: FAO

== See also ==
- Rift Valley lakes
