= Scott's mouse-eared bat =

Conservation status
- Vulnerable (IUCN 3.1)

Scientific classification
- Kingdom: Animalia
- Phylum: Chordata
- Class: Mammalia
- Order: Chiroptera
- Family: Vespertilionidae
- Genus: Myotis
- Species: M. scotti

Binomial name
- Myotis scotti Thomas, 1927

Species of bat

Scott's mouse-eared bat (Myotis scotti) is a species of vesper bat. It is found only in Ethiopia, in subtropical or tropical moist montane forests and shrubland. It is threatened by habitat loss.

== Taxonomy and etymology ==
Scott's mouse-eared bat was described as a new species in 1927 by British zoologist Oldfield Thomas. The eponym for the species name "scotti" was H. H. Scott. Scott had obtained the holotype near Addis Ababa, Ethiopia.
