= Lake Shala =

Alkaline lake situated in Oromia Region, Ethiopia

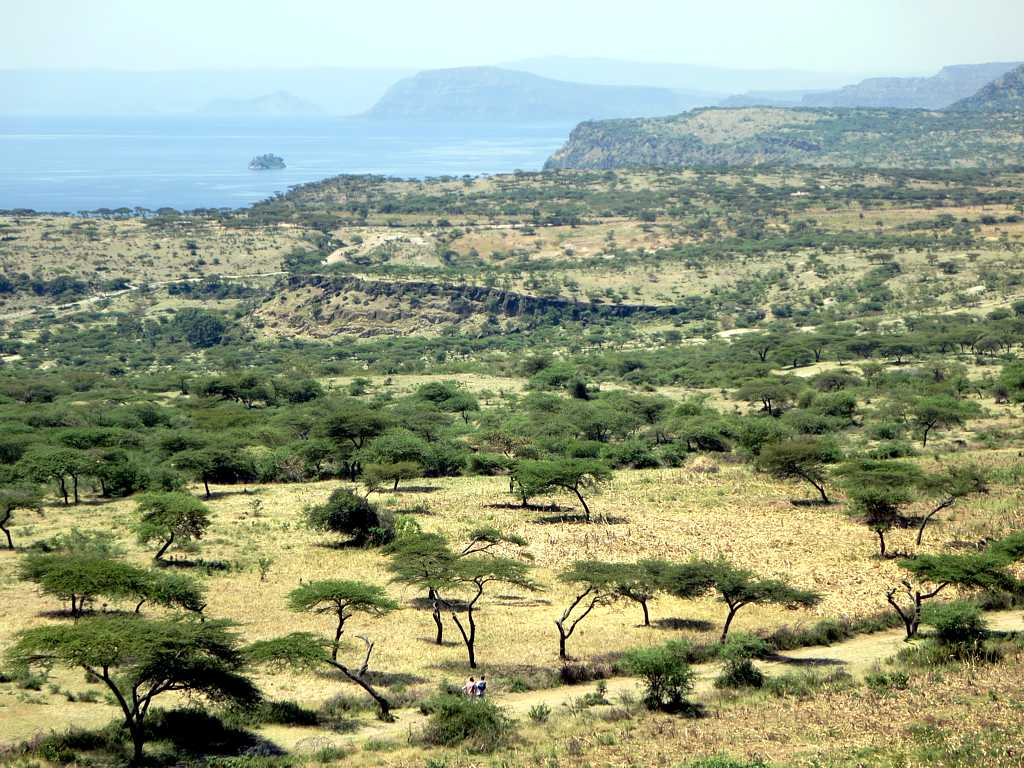
- Lake Shala in background

- Location within Ethiopia

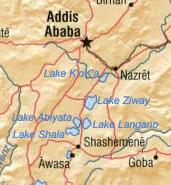
- Coordinates: 7°29′N 38°32′E
- Basin countries: Ethiopia
- Max. length: 28 km (17 mi)
- Max. width: 12 km (7.5 mi)
- Surface area: 329 km^{2} (127 sq mi)
- Average depth: 87 m (285 ft)
- Max. depth: 266 m (873 ft)
- Water volume: 36.7 km^{3} (8.8 cu mi)
- Surface elevation: 1,558 m (5,112 ft)
- Islands: Pelican Island

Lake Shala (also spelled Shalla) is an alkaline lake located in the Ethiopian Rift Valley, in the Abijatta-Shalla National Park.

== Overview ==
The lake is 28 kilometers long and 12 wide, with a surface area of 329 square kilometers. It has a maximum depth of 266 meters and is at an elevation of 1,558 meters. As such, it is the deepest of Ethiopia's Rift Valley lakes.

Known for the sulphur springs on the lake bed, its islands are inhabited by great white pelicans, one being known as Pelican Island.

Lake Shala is surrounded by hot springs filled with boiling water, and the earth surrounding the lake is filled with cracks due to erosion and earthquakes. Due to steam rising from the boiling water in the springs, the atmosphere around the lake is relatively foggy. Various species of flamingoes and birds that frequent the lake are found at its southern end.

== See also ==
- O'a Caldera
- Rift Valley lakes
