= O'a Caldera =

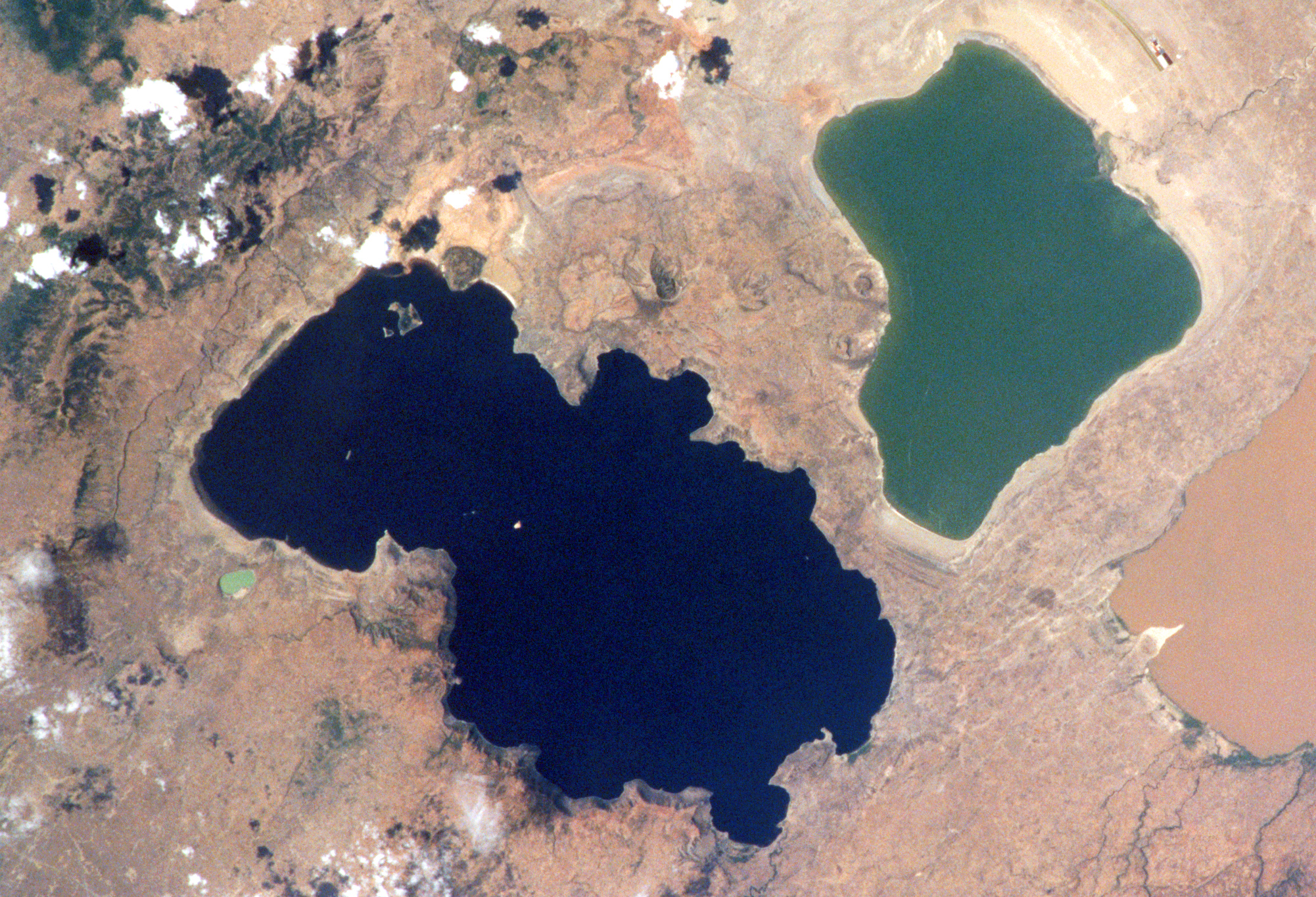

Highest point
- Elevation: 2,075 m (6,808 ft)
- Coordinates: 7°28′0″N 38°35′0″E

Geography
- Location within Ethiopia
- Location: Ethiopia

Geology
- Rock age: Holocene
- Mountain type: Caldera
- Last eruption: Unknown, ongoing fumarolic activity.

The O'a Caldera, also known as Shala, is a volcanic caldera in Ethiopia. It has two lakes: Lake Shala and a small maar called Lake Chitu. Sub-features include Mount Fike (a pyroclastic cone) and Mount Billa (a cinder cone).
