= Lake Abijatta =

Alkaline lake in Oromia Region, Ethiopia

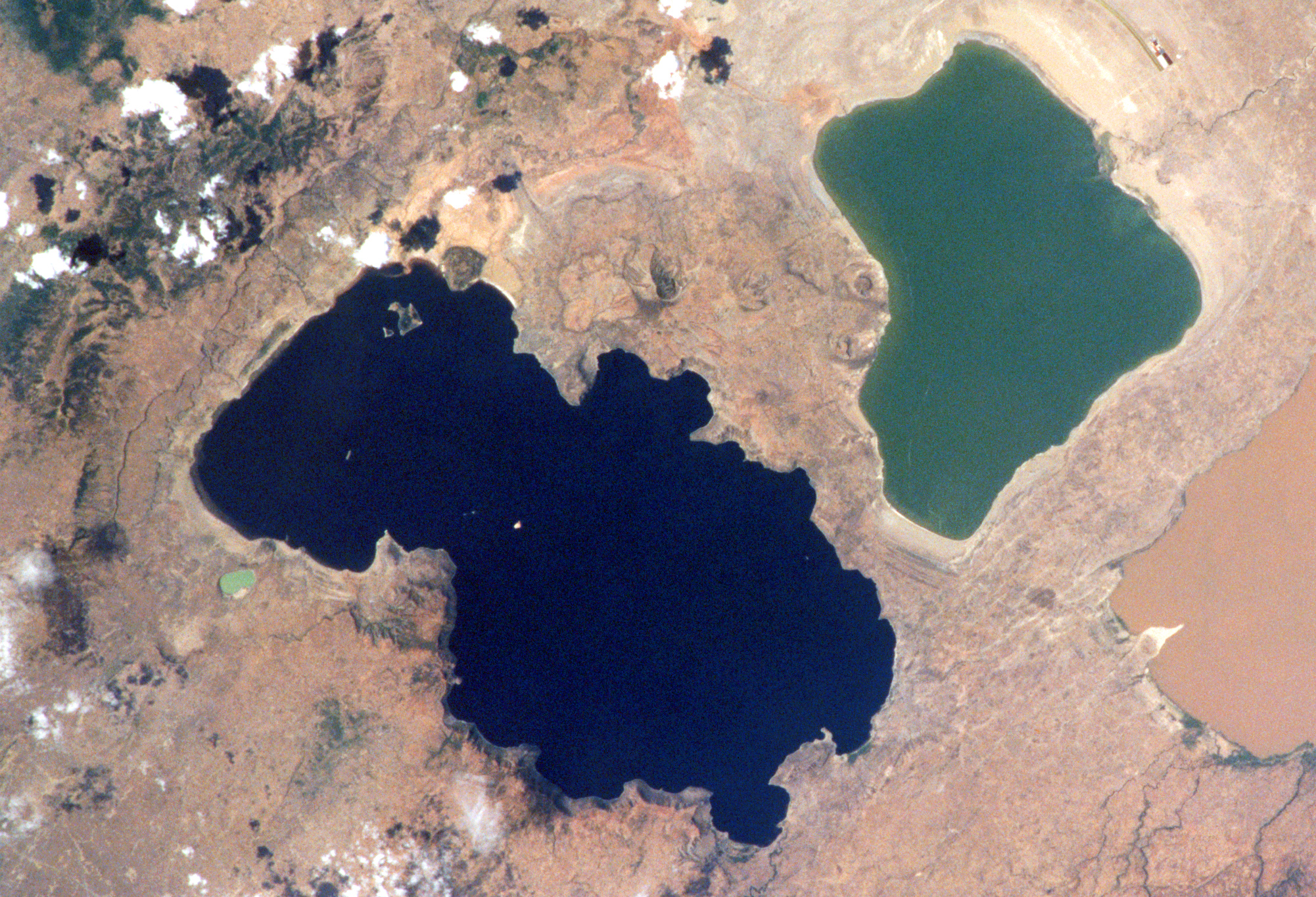
- Lake Abijatta (right) and Lake Shala (left)

- Location within Ethiopia

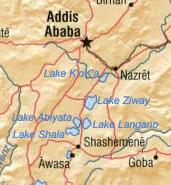
- Coordinates: 7°37′N 38°36′E
- Basin countries: Ethiopia
- Max. length: 17 km (11 mi)
- Max. width: 15 km (9.3 mi)
- Surface area: 205 km^{2} (79 sq mi)
- Max. depth: 14 m (46 ft)
- Surface elevation: 1,573 m (5,161 ft)

Lake Abijatta is an alkaline lake in Ethiopia. It lies in the Main Ethiopian Rift valley south of Addis Ababa, in the Abijatta-Shalla National Park.

== Overview ==
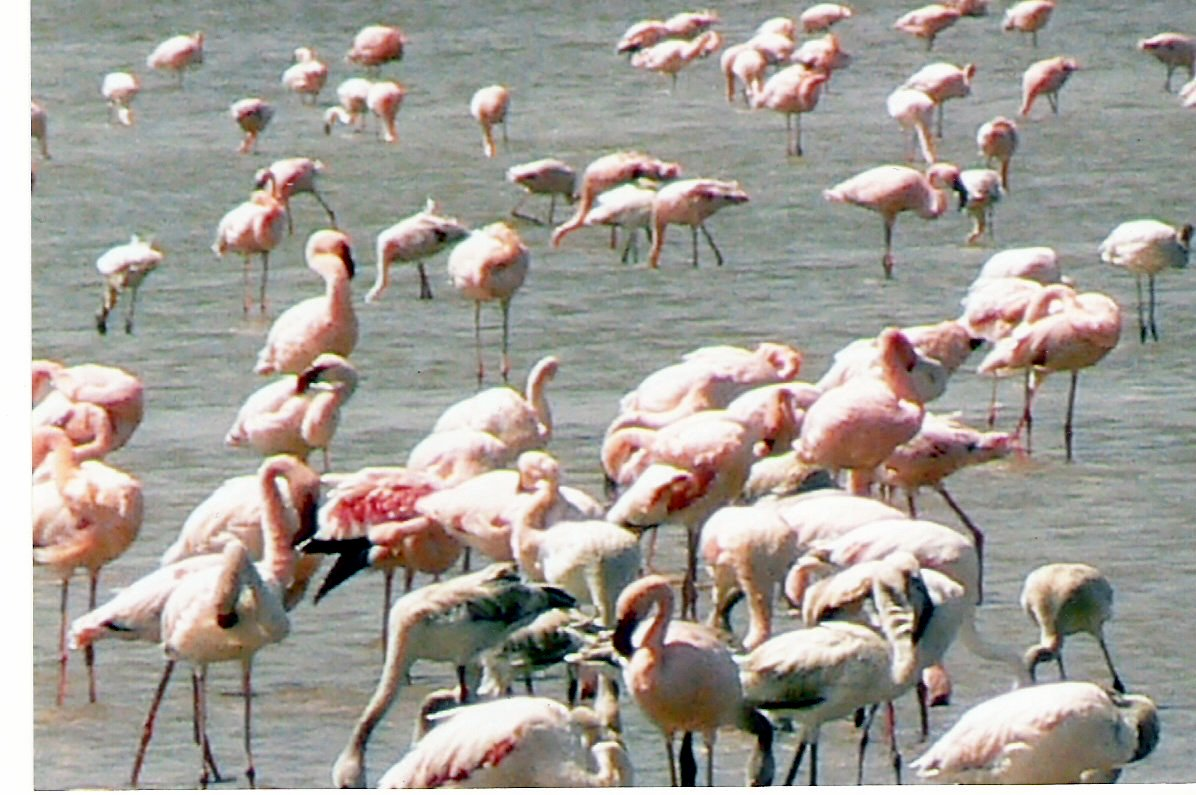
Flamingoes on Lake Abiyatta

According to the Statistical Abstract of Ethiopia for 1967/68, the lake is 17 kilometers long and 15 km wide, with a surface area of 205 square kilometers. It has a maximum depth of 14 meters and is at an elevation of 1,573 meters.

Along the northeastern corner of this lake are a number of hot springs, which are important both as a tourist attraction and to the local inhabitants.

Additionally, there is a soda ash operation on the shores of this lake, which produces 20,000 tons of sodium carbonate. Proven reserves at Lake Abijata, as well as the neighboring Shala and Chitu lakes, exceed 460 million tons. Flamingoes are also found at the lake.

Multidisciplinary studies, including the examination of sedimentology, palynology, diatoms and organic matter have been undertaken on a 6 m core from Lake Abijata, Ethiopia. The bottom of this core has been dated at 1720 ± BP. Analyses have shown four distinct stages in lake evolution. Two transgressive phases that have been recognized can be correlated with other lake level evidence. The transgressions result from changing inputs from lowland and highland regions within the catchment. They are most probably related to changes in seasonal rainfall patterns.

== See also ==
- Rift Valley lakes
