= Dwarf cichlid =

Subfamily of fishes

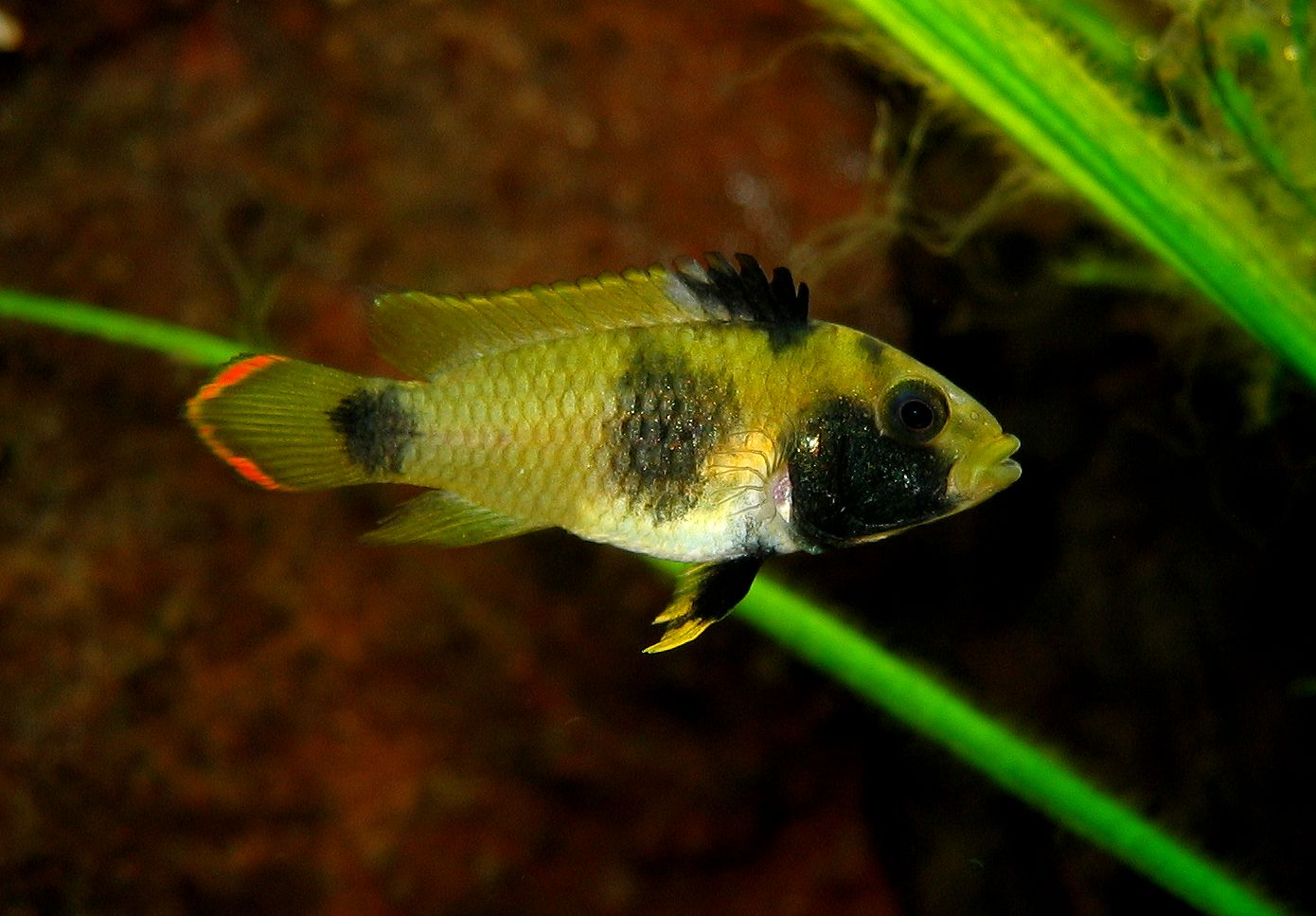
Like most (but not all) South American dwarf cichlids, Apistogramma nijsseni is a member of the subfamily Geophaginae.

Dwarf cichlid is a term used by fishkeeping hobbyists to describe an arbitrary assemblage of small-sized fish from the family Cichlidae. Although the grouping is widely used in the aquarium industry and hobby, the grouping has no taxonomic or ecological basis and is poorly defined. Though dwarf cichlids are by definition small-sized cichlids, there is no accepted maximum length of a dwarf-sized cichlid. Some authors suggest a maximum of 10 centimetres (3.9 in.), while other suggest a maximum length of 12 centimetres (4.7 in.). The term is most frequently used to describe small South American or West African species which are suitable for soft, acidic (pH 4 to 7) densely planted aquariums, however, some aquarists and authors include within this "dwarf cichlid group" a variety of small-sized cichlids from the alkaline African rift lakes.

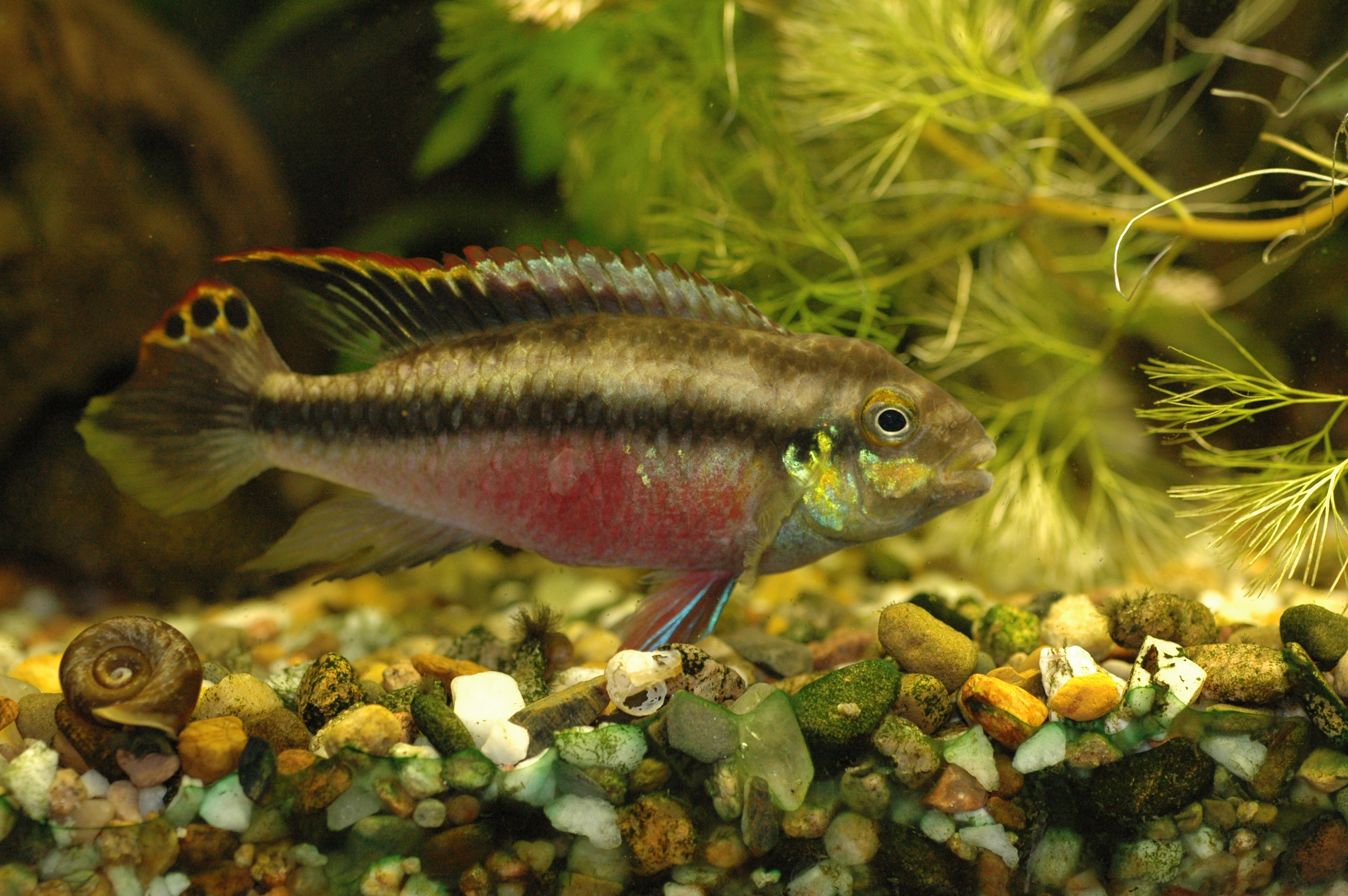
Despite being called dwarf cichlids, males of Pelvicachromis pulcher frequently exceed the conventional maximum length of 12 centimetres.

Dwarf cichlids prefer aquaria with plenty of hard-leafed plants. They are generally shy, except when they are breeding, and are considered ideal for community tanks, though they should not be placed with other, non-dwarf, cichlids or other boisterous or aggressive species.

== See also ==
- List of freshwater aquarium fish species
