= Rift Valley lakes =

Group of lakes in the East African Rift

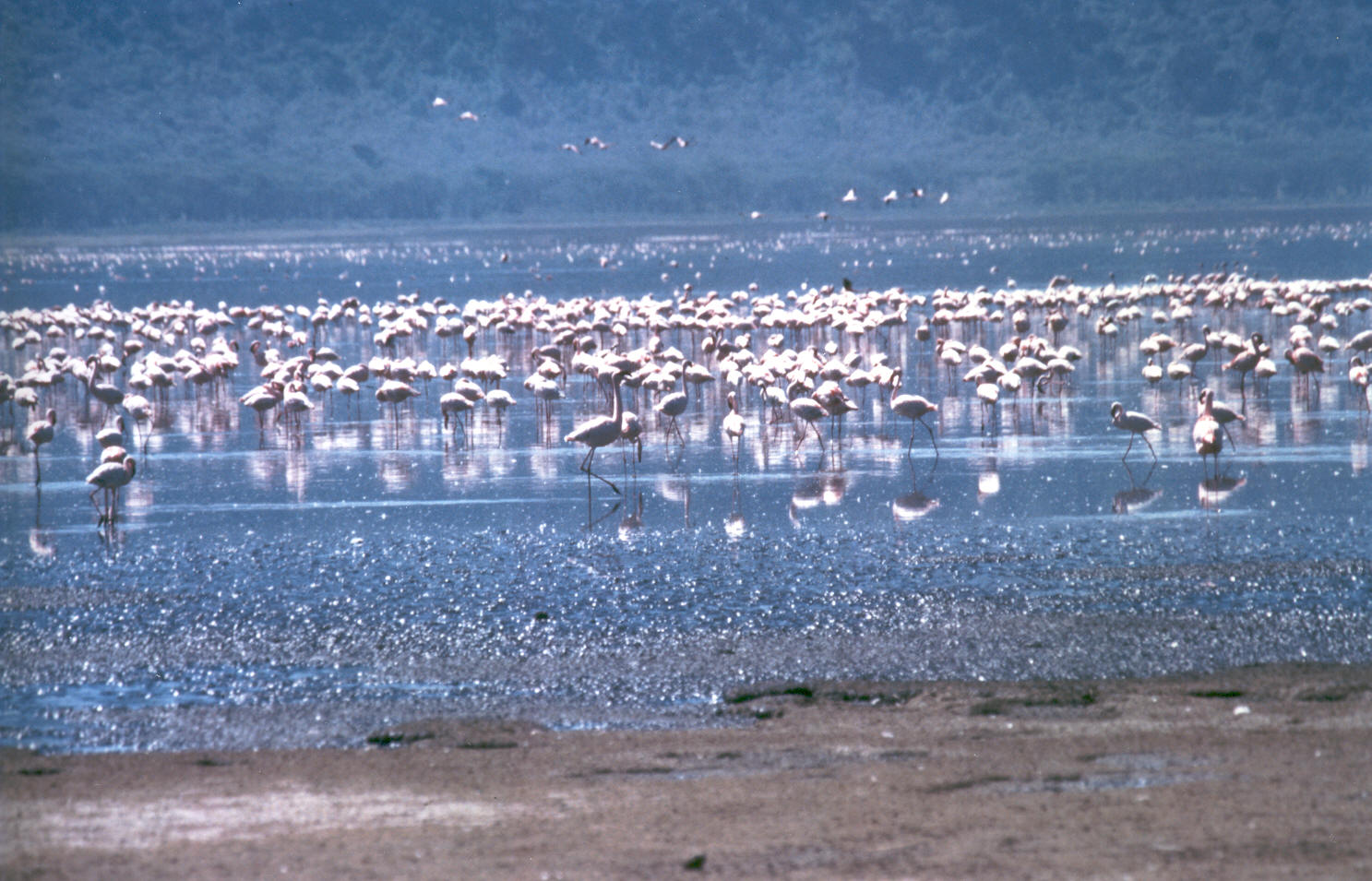
- Greater and lesser flamingos flock to Lake Nakuru in Kenya

- Location within Africa
- Location: East Africa
- Coordinates: 3°00′N 36°20′E
- Type: Series of lakes

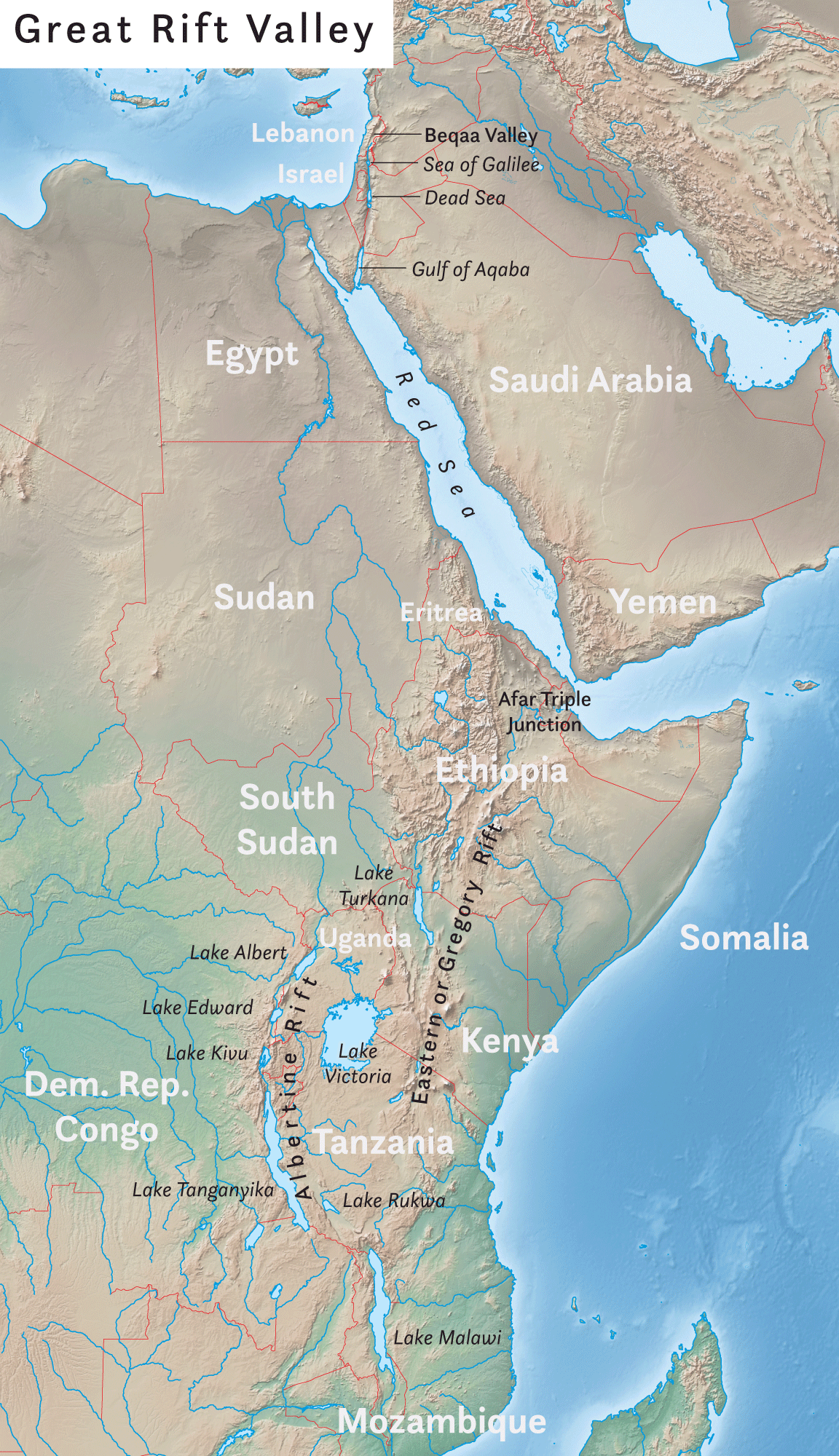
Map of larger region that the lakes are in, including the so-called Great Rift Valley.

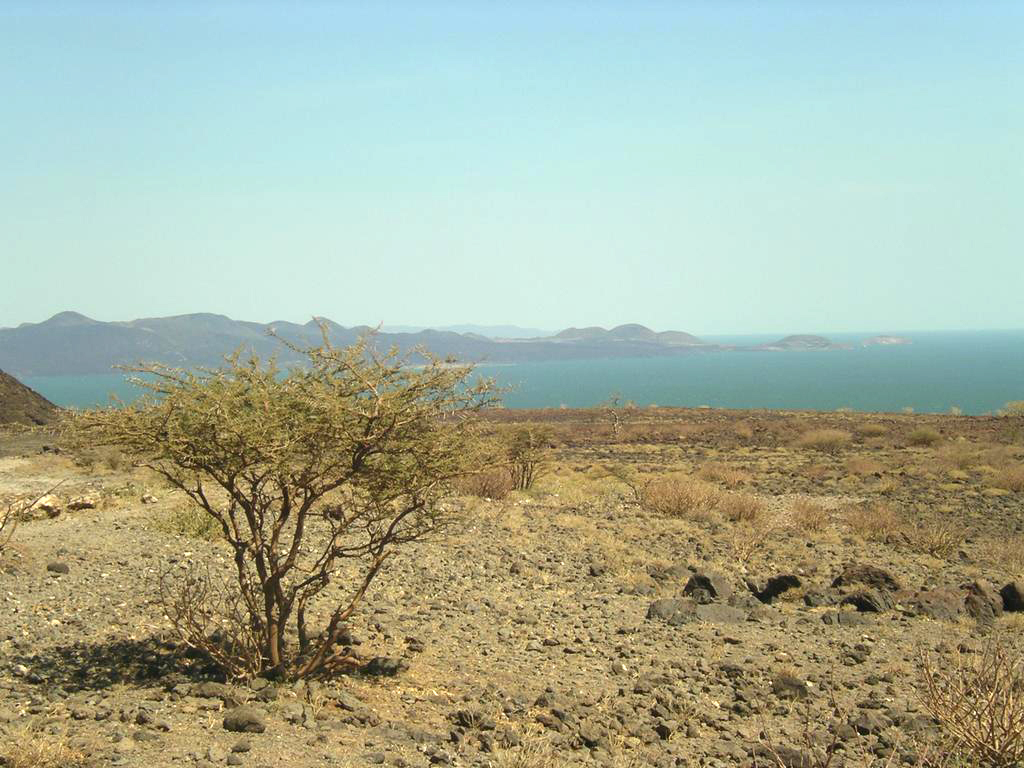
View over Lake Turkana

The Rift Valley lakes are a series of lakes in the East African Rift valley that runs through eastern Africa from Ethiopia in the north to Malawi in the south, and includes the African Great Lakes in the south. These include some of the world's oldest lakes, deepest lakes, largest lakes by area, and largest lakes by volume. Many are freshwater ecoregions of great biodiversity, while others are alkaline "soda lakes" supporting highly specialised organisms.

The Rift Valley lakes are well known for the evolution of at least 800 cichlid fish species that live in their waters. More species are expected to be discovered.

The World Wide Fund for Nature has designated these lakes as one of its Global 200 priority ecoregions for conservation.

== Geology ==
Lake Malawi and Lake Tanganyika have formed in the various valleys of the East African Rift zone. Lake Kivu's "still waters ... hide another face: dissolved within are billions of cubic meters of flammable methane and more still of carbon dioxide, the result of volcanic gases seeping in."

== Ethiopian Rift Valley lakes national park ==
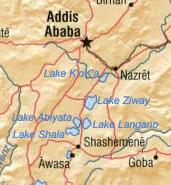

The Ethiopian Rift Valley lakes are the northernmost of the African Rift Valley lakes. In central Ethiopia, the Main Ethiopian Rift, also known as the Great Rift Valley, splits the Ethiopian Highlands into northern and southern halves, and the Ethiopian Rift Valley lakes occupy the floor of the rift valley between the two highlands. Most of the Ethiopian Rift Valley lakes do not have an outlet, and most are alkaline. Although the Ethiopian Rift Valley lakes are of great importance to Ethiopia's economy, as well as being essential to the survival of the local people, there were no intensive and extensive limnological studies undertaken of these lakes until recently.

The major ones are

- Lake Abaya (areal extent 1,162 square kilometres (449 mi^{2}), elevation 1,285 metres (4,216 ft), maximum depth 13.1 metres (43 ft)), the largest Ethiopian Rift Valley lake by surface area
- Lake Chamo (areal extent 551 square kilometres (213 mi^{2}), elevation 1,235 metres (4,052 ft), maximum depth 14 metres (46 ft))
- Lake Zway or Dambal (areal extent 485 square kilometres (187 mi^{2}), elevation 1,636 metres (5,367 ft), maximum depth 8.9 metres (29 ft))
- Lake Shala (areal extent 329 square kilometres (127 mi^{2}), elevation 1,558 metres (5,112 ft), maximum depth 266 metres (873 ft)), the deepest Ethiopian Rift Valley lake and the largest by water volume
- Koka Reservoir (areal extent 250 square kilometres (97 mi^{2}), elevation 1,590 metres (5,220 ft), maximum depth not listed)
- Lake Langano (areal extent 230 square kilometres (89 mi^{2}), elevation 1,585 metres (5,200 ft), maximum depth 46 metres (151 ft))
- Lake Abijatta (areal extent 205 square kilometres (79 mi^{2}), elevation 1,573 metres (5,161 ft), maximum depth 14 metres (46 ft))
- Lake Awasa (areal extent 129 square kilometres (50 mi^{2}), elevation 1,708 metres (5,604 ft), maximum depth 10 metres (33 ft))

Lake Tana, the source of the Blue Nile, lies in the Ethiopian highlands north of the Rift Valley; however, it is not a Rift Valley lake.

== Eastern Rift Valley lakes ==
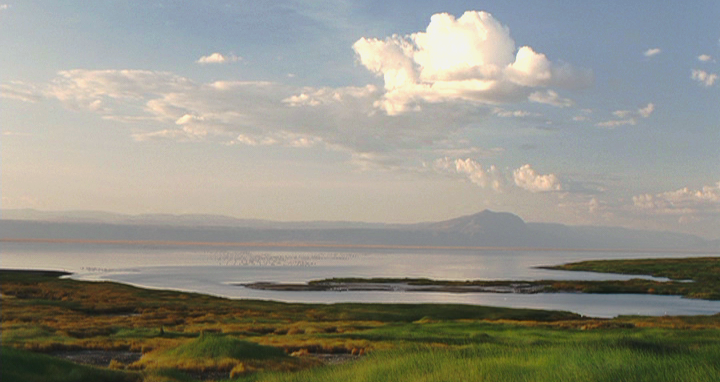
Lake Natron

South of the Ethiopian highlands, the rift valley splits into two major troughs. The Eastern Rift is home to the Kenyan Rift Valley lakes, while most of the Central African Rift Valley lakes lie in the Western Rift. This area includes the Gregory Rift in Kenya and Tanzania.

=== Kenya ===
The Kenyan section of the Rift Valley is home to eight lakes, of which three are freshwater and the rest alkaline. Of the latter, the shallow soda lakes of the Eastern Rift Valley have crystallised salt turning the shores white and are famous for the large flocks of flamingo that feed on crustaceans.

- Lake Baringo: second largest of the Kenyan Rift Valley lakes.
  - 130 square kilometres (50 sq mi), elevation 970 metres (3,180 ft), freshwater
- Lake Bogoria: shallow soda lake, a national preserve.
  - 34 square kilometres (13 mi^{2}), elevation 990 metres (3,250 ft)
- Lake Elmenteita: shallow soda lake.
- Lake Logipi: a shallow hot-spring fed soda lake in the Suguta Valley just south of Lake Turkana. Formerly Lake Suguta
- Lake Magadi: shallow soda lake near the southern border with Tanzania.
- Lake Naivasha:
  - 160 square kilometres (62 mi^{2}) although it varies somewhat with rainfall, elevation 1,890 metres (6,200 ft), freshwater
- Lake Nakuru: shallow soda lake, has been a national park since 1968.
  - 40 square kilometres (15 mi^{2}), elevation 1,759 metres (5,771 ft)
- Lake Turkana: the largest of the Kenyan lakes, on the border of Kenya and Ethiopia.
  - 6,405 square kilometres (2,473 mi^{2}), elevation 360 metres (1,180 ft), freshwater

=== Tanzania ===
All the lakes in the Tanzanian section of this group are alkaline:

- Lake Eyasi: shallow soda lake
- Lake Kitangiri
- Lake Makati: shallow soda lake
- Lake Manyara: shallow soda lake
- Lake Natron: shallow soda lake that has been categorised by the World Wildlife Fund as being in the East African halophytics ecoregion.

== Western or Albertine Rift Valley lakes ==

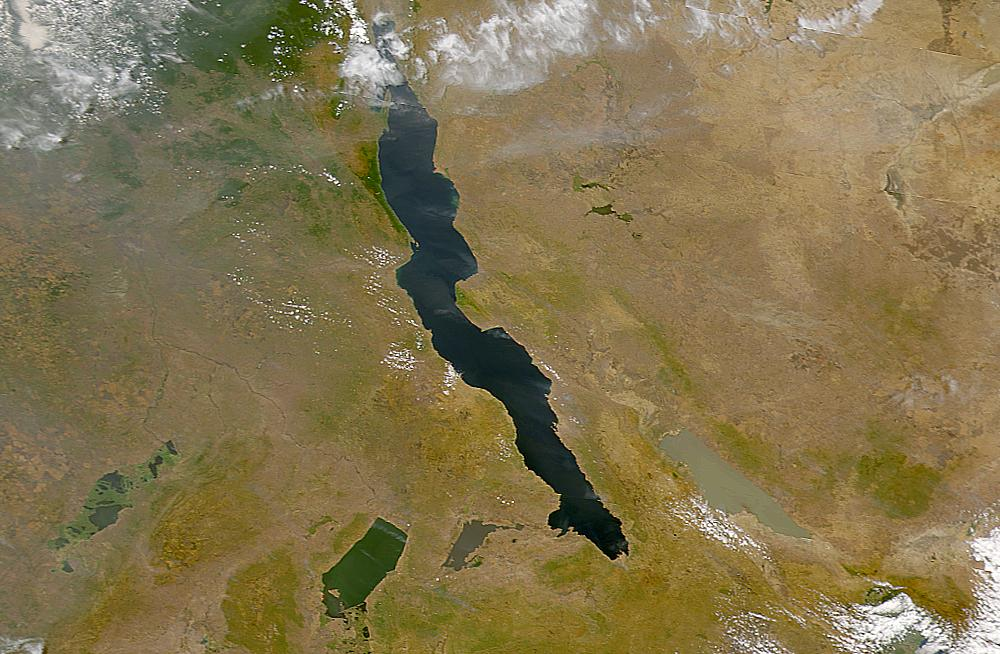
Some of the Rift Valley lakes. From left to right they are Lake Upemba, Lake Mweru, Lake Tanganyika (largest), and Lake Rukwa. This image spans the SE corner of the Democratic Republic of the Congo, NE Zambia, and southern Tanzania.

The lakes of the Western or Albertine Rift, with Lake Victoria, include the largest, deepest, and oldest of the Rift Valley Lakes. They are also referred to as the Central African lakes. Lakes Albert, Victoria, and Edward are part of the Nile River basin.

Lake Victoria (elevation 1,134 metres (3,720 ft)), with an area of 68,800 square kilometres (26,600 mi^{2}), is the largest lake in Africa. It is not in the Rift Valley, instead occupying a depression between the eastern and western rifts formed by the uplift of the rifts to either side. Lakes Victoria, Tanganyika, and Malawi are sometimes collectively known as the African Great Lakes.

The Western Rift Valley lakes are fresh water and home to an extraordinary number of species. Approximately 1,500 cichlid fish (Cichlidae) species live in the lakes. In addition to the cichlids, populations of Clariidae, Claroteidae, Mochokidae, Poeciliidae, Mastacembelidae, Centropomidae, Cyprinidae, Clupeidae and other fish families are found in these lakes. They are also important habitats for a number of amphibian species, including Amietophrynus kisoloensis, Bufo keringyagae, Cardioglossa cyaneospila, and Nectophryne batesii.

- Lake Albert (5,300 square kilometres (2,000 mi^{2}), elevation 615 metres (2,018 ft)) is the northernmost lake in the western rift.
- Lake Edward (2,325 square kilometres (898 mi^{2}), elevation 912 metres (2,992 ft)) drains north into Lake Albert
- Lake Kivu (2,220 square kilometres (860 mi^{2}), elevation 1,460 metres (4,790 ft)) empties into Lake Tanganyika via the Ruzizi River.
- Lake Tanganyika (32,900 square kilometres (12,700 mi^{2}), elevation 773 metres (2,536 ft)) is the largest and deepest of the Rift Valley lakes (more than 1,400 metres (4,600 ft)), and is the second deepest fresh water lake on the planet (after Lake Baikal). Below roughly 200 meters depth, its water is anoxic and devoid of life besides anoxic bacteria. It is very sensitive to climate. It is part of the Congo River basin, feeding into the River Congo via the Lukuga River.

== Southern Rift Valley lakes (Tanzania and Malawi) ==
The Southern Rift Valley lakes are like the Western Rift Valley lakes in that, with one exception, they are freshwater lakes.

- Lake Rukwa (about 5,670 square kilometres (2,190 mi^{2}) but quite variable) in Tanzania is the alkaline exception, lying south-east of Tanganyika, and has no outlet.
- Lake Malawi (30,000 square kilometres (12,000 mi^{2}), elevation 500 metres (1,600 ft)), the second largest and second deepest of the Rift Valley lakes at over 700 metres (2,300 ft), is drained by the Shire River, a tributary of the Zambezi River. Also known as Lake Nyasa.
- Lake Malombe (450 square kilometres (170 mi^{2})) is on the Shire River.
- Lake Chilwa (1,750 square kilometres (680 mi^{2}), elevation 622 metres (2,041 ft)) has no outlet but extensive wetlands. It is the southernmost of the Rift Valley lakes.

== Other lakes of the Great Rift Valley ==
- Lake Mweru (5,120 square kilometres (1,980 mi^{2}) elevation 922 m) lies in the Lake Mweru-Luapula graben, which is a branch off the Albertine rift.
- Lake Mweru Wantipa (1,500 square kilometres (580 mi^{2}), elevation 930 metres (3,050 ft)) is a marshy lake between lakes Tanganyika and Mweru, and is endorheic but may overflow into Lake Mweru at times of very high flood.
