= Great Rift Valley, Ethiopia =

Branch of the East African Rift that runs through Ethiopia

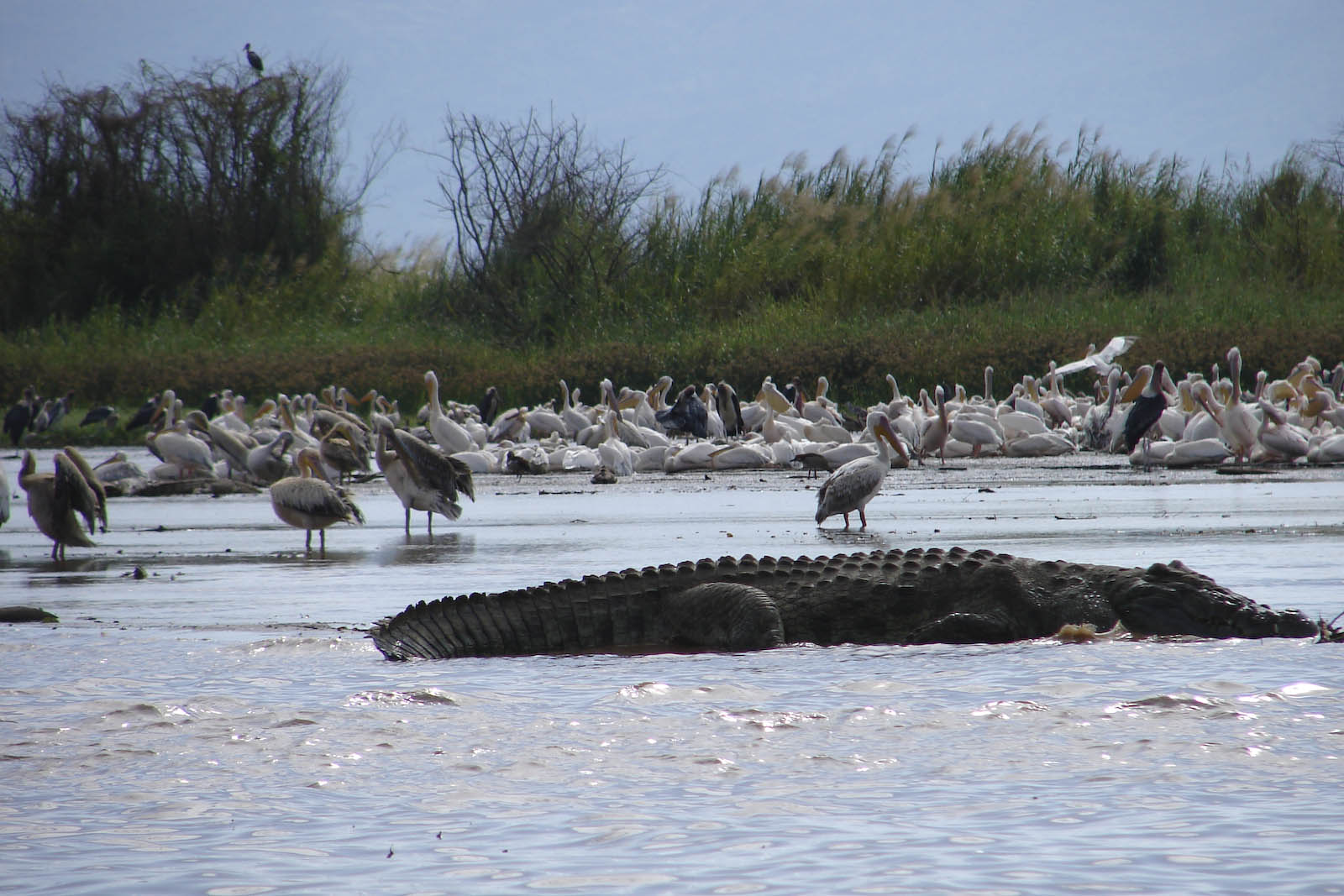
Crocodile and pelicans in Lake Chamo, a Rift Valley lake in the Ethiopian rift

The Great Rift Valley of Ethiopia, (or Main Ethiopian Rift or Ethiopian Rift Valley) is a branch of the East African Rift that runs through Ethiopia in a southwest direction from the Afar triple junction. In the past, it was seen as part of a "Great Rift Valley" that ran from Mozambique to Syria. Known for its scenery and diverse wildlife in Ethiopia specifically the Rift Valley holds importance in the field of human evolution. It is recognized as an area for researching the stages of human development with crucial fossil findings, such as Lucy (Australopithecus afarensis) unearthed within its bounds.

== Description ==
The Great Rift Valley lies between the Ethiopian Plateau to the north and the Somalia Plateau to the south. The rift developed as the Nubian and Somali plates began to separate during the Miocene Period along the East African rift system. Rift initiation was asynchronous along the Ethiopian rift valley: deformation began around 18 million years ago at the south end, around 11 million years ago close to the Afar depression and probably around 6-8 million years ago in the central sector. The rift is extending in an ESE-WNW direction at about 5–7 millimetres (0.20–0.28 inches) annually.

The Ethiopian rift valley is about 80 kilometres (50 mi) wide and bordered on both margins by large, discontinuous normal faults that give rise to major tectonic escarpments separating the rift floor from the surrounding plateaus. These faults are now thought to be inactive at the northern rift valley termination, whereas to the south they are still tectonically and seismically active. The rift floor is cut by a series of smaller en echelon, right-stepping, rift basins of Quaternary to recent age. These basins are about 20 kilometres (12 mi) wide and 60 kilometres (37 mi) long. In the northern part of the rift, extension within the valley is now thought to be mainly along these faulted and magmatically active segments. These segments are considered to be developing mid ocean ridge spreading centers.

== Ethiopian Rift Valley lakes ==
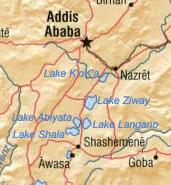
Central lakes

The Ethiopia Rift Valley lakes are the northernmost of the African Rift Valley Lakes. The Ethiopian Rift Valley lakes occupy the floor of the rift valley between the two highlands. Most of the Ethiopian Rift Valley lakes do not have an outlet, and most are alkaline. Although the Ethiopian Rift Valley Lakes are of great importance to Ethiopia's economy, as well as being essential to the survival of the local people, there were no intensive and extensive limnological studies undertaken of these lakes until recently.

The major ones are

- Lake Abaya (1,162 km^{2} (449 sq mi), elevation 1,285 m (4,216 ft)), the largest Ethiopian Rift Valley lake
- Lake Chamo (551 km^{2} (213 sq mi), elevation 1,235 m (4,052 ft))
- Lake Zway (485 km^{2} (187 sq mi), elevation 1,636 m (5,367 ft))
- Lake Shala (329 km^{2} (127 sq mi), elevation 1,558 m (5,112 ft)), the deepest Ethiopian Rift Valley lake
- Lake Koka (250 km^{2} (97 sq mi), elevation 1,590 m (5,220 ft))
- Lake Langano (230 km^{2} (89 sq mi), elevation 1,585 m (5,200 ft))
- Lake Abijatta (205 km^{2} (79 sq mi), elevation 1,573 m (5,161 ft))
- Lake Awasa (129 km^{2} (50 sq mi), elevation 1,708 m (5,604 ft))
