= Fentale =

District in Oromia, Ethiopia

Coordinates: 8°45′N 39°50′E

Fentale is one of the districts in the Oromia of Ethiopia. Part of the East Shewa Zone located in the Great Rift Valley, Fentale is bordered on the southeast by the Arsi Zone, on the southwest by Boset, on the northwest by the Amhara Region, and on the northeast by the Afar Region. The administrative center of Fentale is Metehara; other towns include Haroo Adii.

== Overview ==
Most parts of this woreda range from 900 to 1000 meters above sea level; Mount Fentale (2400 meters) is the highest point. Rivers include the Awash and the Germama; Lake Basaka is an important body of water in this woreda. Points of interest include the Awash National Park in the north. A survey of the land in this woreda shows that 8.2% is arable or cultivable, 7.6% pasture, 28.8% forest, and the remaining 55.4% is considered degraded or otherwise unusable. The Metehara Sugar Cane Plantation covers 100 square kilometers. In 11 of the 18 kebeles of Fentale, the predominant agricultural practice is pastoralism. Camels, goats and cattle are the most common livestock; migration to the border areas of Boset woreda for grazing during normal years is common, but in years of low rainfall herdsmen will migrate as far as Negele Arsi. Another source of income is the sale of firewood and charcoal. The vegetation is primarily acacia trees with the bushes and shrubs common to the lowland portions of Ethiopia. Fruits and vegetables are important cash crops.

Industry in the woreda includes 31 grain mills and the Metehara Sugar Cane Plantation. There were 593 licensed business enterprises in Fentale, which included 85 wholesalers, 294 retailers and 214 service providers of different types. There are also 16 Farmers Associations with 5,318 members but no Farmers Service Cooperatives. Fentale has 33 kilometers of dry-weather and 157 of all-weather road, for an average road density of 162.4 kilometers per 1000 square kilometers. About 100% of the urban, 22% of rural and 38% of the total population has access to drinking water. The primary ethnic groups reported in this woreda include the Karrayyu and Ittu Oromos.

== Demographics ==
The 2007 national census reported a total population for this woreda of 81,740, of whom 43,266 were men and 38,474 were women; 20,522 or 25.11% of its population were urban dwellers. The majority of the inhabitants said they were Muslim, with 43.49% of the population reporting they observed this belief, while 27.74% of the population practised Ethiopian Orthodox Christianity, and 18.96% of the population were Protestant.

Based on figures published by the Central Statistical Agency in 2005, this woreda has an estimated total population of 87,424, of whom 41,437 are men and 45,987 are women; 21,348 or 24.42% of its population are urban dwellers, which is less than the Zone average of 32.1%. With an estimated area of 1,169.85 square kilometers, Fentale has an estimated population density of 74.7 people per square kilometer, which is less than the Zone average of 181.7.

The 1994 national census reported a total population for this woreda of 60,048, of whom 31,638 were men and 28,410 women; 11,934 or 19.87% of its population were urban dwellers at the time. The five largest ethnic groups reported in Fentale were the Oromo (46.54%), the Amhara (17.73%), the Kambaata (12.19%), the Hadiya (12.19%), and the Welayta (1.08%); all other ethnic groups made up 2.58% of the population. Oromiffa was spoken as a first language by 43.25%, 39.78% spoke Amharic, 5.79% spoke Kambaata, 3.38% spoke Welayta, and 3.27% spoke Hadiya; the remaining 4.53% spoke all other primary languages reported. The plurality of the inhabitants were Ethiopian Orthodox Christianity, with 39.1% of the population reporting they practiced that belief, while 35.41% of the population said they were Moslem, 12.75% Roman Catholic, 7.19% practiced traditional beliefs, and 4.27% were Protestant.
