= May 2023 Oromia clashes =

Conflict in Ethiopia

- Part of OLA insurgency
Date	28 May 2023
Location	West Shewa Zone, East Shewa Zone, and Horu Goduru Wollega Zone, Oromia, Ethiopia
Result	Indecisive

Belligerents
ENDF; Oromia police Kebele militias	Oromo Liberation Army

Units involved
Unknown	Badho Dachas Brigade; Magarsa Bari Brigade; Bakalcha Bari Brigade; Obomboletti Brigade

Casualties and losses
681 killed (per OLA); 486 injured 115 captured	6+ killed
- 9+ civilians killed 2+ injured

Following the failure of peace talks on 3 May 2023, troops from the Ethiopian National Defense Force and the allied Oromia State police forces and Amhara Fano militants launched an offensive against the Oromo Liberation Army in several woredas of Oromia. The OLA claimed to have killed over 680 Ethiopian troops in the offensive.

== Background ==
The ethnic Oromo Oromo Liberation Army (OLA-Shane) has waged an insurgency against the Ethiopian government for decades, particularly in Oromia and Oromo-inhabited areas of Amhara Region and other regions. In 2018, the political half of the Oromo Liberation Front split and became a political party recognized by the Ethiopian government, but in 2019 the OLA resumed attacks on the Ethiopian government and split from the OLF. In 2021, during the Tigray war, the OLA joined the Tigray Defense Forces in a joint offensive against the Ethiopian capital Addis Ababa, but were repelled.

In early 2022, violence in Oromia shifted from the west to West Shewa Zone, East Shewa Zone, and Horo Guduru Welega Zone. This was due to an OLA offensive in late 2022 seizing control of much of West Welega Zone, East Welega Zone, and Kelam Welega Zone in western Oromia. The fighting in early 2023 displaced at least 30,000 people into Amhara region. On 27 April 2023, Ethiopian president Abiy Ahmed and the OLA agreed to talks in Tanzania between 27 April and 3 May.

== Offensive ==
=== OLA offensive ===
Immediately following the return of OLA delegations from Tanzania, violence spiked in Oromia. On 6 May, OLA militants killed seven people including the ruling Prosperity Party head of Afar Region Omar Lemma in Welenchiti, East Shewa. Around 30 gunmen took part in Lemma's assassination, with his brother Ali saying that the perpetrators were dressed in Ethiopian army fatigues. The following day, the OLA claimed to have "neutralized" 75 Ethiopian soldiers and captured 4 in Adami Tullu, East Shewa along with a separate attack at the Abidjata soda ash factory in Arsi Negele that killed 25 soldiers and injured 18 others. OLA media claimed on 8 May that clashes in Osole killed 50 Ethiopian soldiers, injured 26 others, and that the OLA captured 10 soldiers.

Clashes continued in Adda Takari in southern Oromia and Gara Muktar in West Hararghe Zone on 11 May. The OLA claimed to have killed 21 Ethiopian soldiers, injured 23, and captured an unknown number more in Adda Takari, and in Gara Muktar they claimed that 30 troops were killed, 37 injured, and some guns taken. The next day, the OLA claimed to have killed 12 fighters in Gara Wajija, West Hararghe. Additionally on 12 May, a kebele militia member shot and killed three civilians and injured a child and his father in Sheger City, allegedly for collaborating with the OLA. The shooting was part of a wider trend of government-sponsored extrajudicial killings against alleged OLA sympathizers.

On 13 May, the OLA claimed to have halted several ENDF offensives across the region. The first fighting began in Qare Watiyo in the early morning. There, the OLA claimed that 75 ENDF troops were killed and 126 were injured, along with 35 others and hundreds of weapons captured. In Meta Wolkite, the OLA claimed to have killed 94 soldiers, injured 71, and captured 50 along with hundreds of weapons. Photos were released by the OLA of several dozen captured soldiers in Meta Wolkite. Several others were reported killed and injured in Jirma Qorphessa in West Shawa. The OLA also claimed to have counterattacked in two areas; Gijo Kombe and Hero, both in West Shawa. In Gijo Kombe, fourteen ENDF troops were reported killed, 20 injured, and four captured. In Hero, an ENDF convoy was ambushed, killing seven and injuring nine.

The OLA also claimed two ambushes on 14 May in Bishoftu and Ilfata. In Bishoftu, between four and seven officers were killed and prisoners were released. In Ilfata, the OLA claimed that 13 ENDF troops were killed and eight were injured. The following day, the OLA claimed to have stormed an ENDF base in Galan Wadessa, sparking a 3 hour long battle that killed 66 ENDF troops and injured 71 others.

=== Ethiopian offensive ===
The OLA accused the ENDF of launching an "all-out offensive" in the region on 17 May. In their statement, the OLA also accused Ethiopian forces of targeting and torturing civilians. Clashes were reported in Kombolcha town in Horo Guduru Wollega, with the OLA reportedly seizing the town. The OLA claimed to have killed 81 soldiers, injured 100, and captured over 100 more along with hundreds of weapons in Kombolcha, along with "expelling all regime fighters from this district." OLA militants and Oromia police clashed in Bishoftu and Welenchiti as well. Four officers were killed and one was injured in Bishoftu and several prisoners were released, and in Welenchiti, six OLA militants and two civilians were killed, with the government repelling the attack. The OLA claimed to have expelled all militants from Dadu district as well, killing 25 troops. The OLA claimed to have killed 681 Ethiopian troops and injured 486, along with the capture of 115, between 9 and 17 May.

Following the ENDF offensive, OLA activity expanded to areas without previously-recorded OLA activity. In Bekoji, four civilians were killed by the OLA during an operation to release OLA prisoners on 19 May. After 28 May and into the first week of June, fighting significantly decreased with only 16 fatalities across all of Oromia. However, the violence was widespread.
