= ETG Designers and Consultants =

Ethiopian architectural consulting firm

- Native name: ኢቲጂ ዲዛይነሮች እና አማካሪዎች አ.ማ.
- Company type: Private
- Founded: 1996; 30 years ago
- Founder: Eshetu T. Gelan
- Headquarters: Addis Ababa, Ethiopia
- Area served: Ethiopia
- Key people: Eshetu T. Gelan (Founder); Nolawit Getachew (Board of directors)
- Services: Architectural design and consulting firm

ETG Designers and Consultants S.C. (Amharic: ኢቲጂ ዲዛይነሮች እና አማካሪዎች አ.ማ.) formerly known as ETG Designers and Consultants PLC, is an architectural design and consulting firm founded in 1996 by Eshetu T. Gelan. Its headquarter is in Addis Ababa, Ethiopia. It was founded in 1996.

== Foundation and internal organisation ==
ETG was founded in 1996 as a privately owned architectural firm in Ethiopia with an initial capital of 10,000 Ethiopian Birr (ETB). ETG transitioned from a privately owned firm into an employee-owned share company in the late 2010s.

== Services ==
=== Building design ===
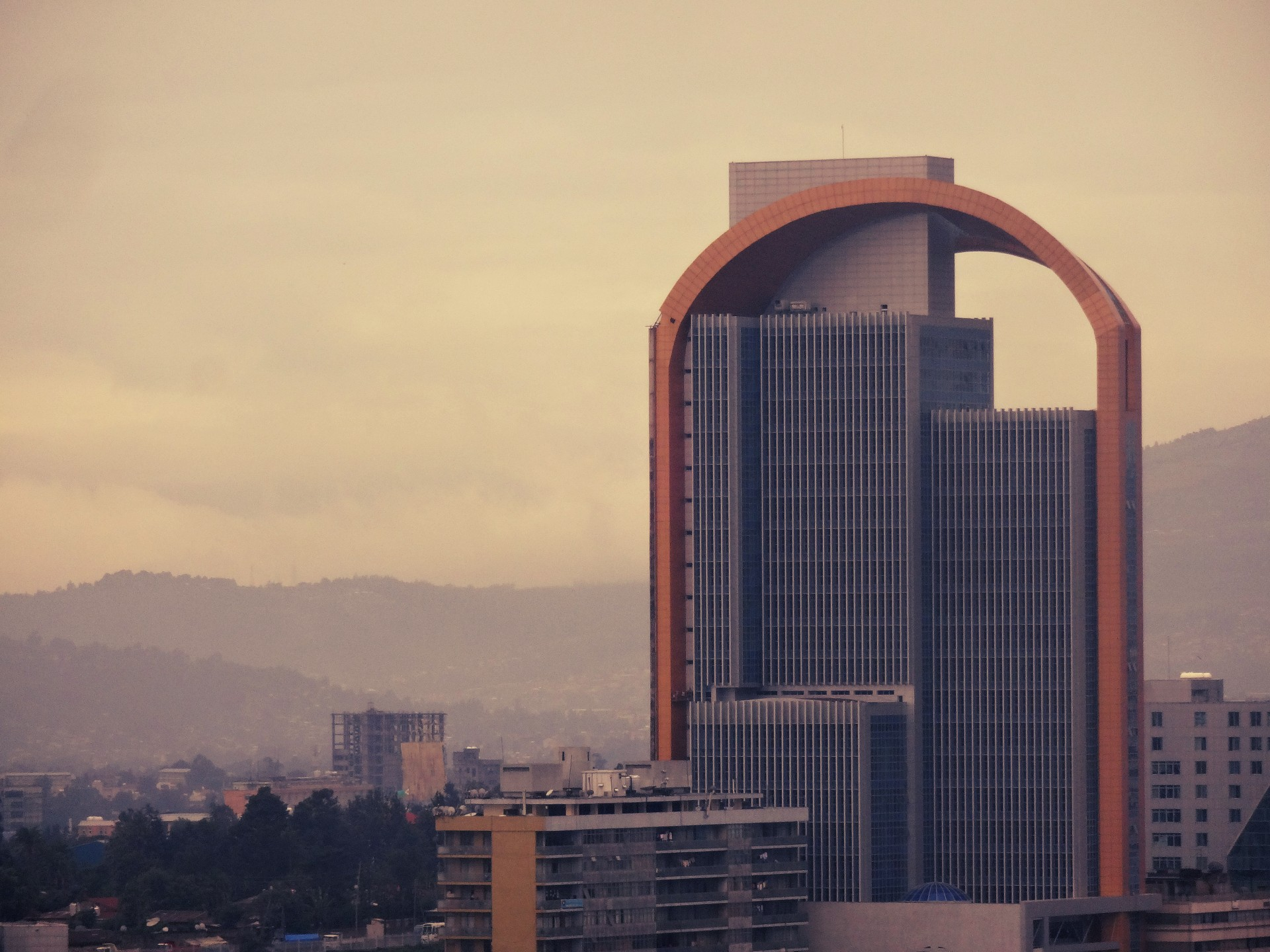
Wegagen Bank Design and supervision by ETG Designers and Consultants

ETG designed and supervised the headquarters for Wegagen Bank. The project integrated Green Building Concepts and Technologies and was finalized within six years with a budget of almost 1 billion Ethiopian Birr (ETB).

Following the completion of Wegagen Bank, the company designed several buildings for financial institutions, including a 36-story mixed-use tower for the Amhara Credit and Savings Institute.

=== Contract administration and supervision ===
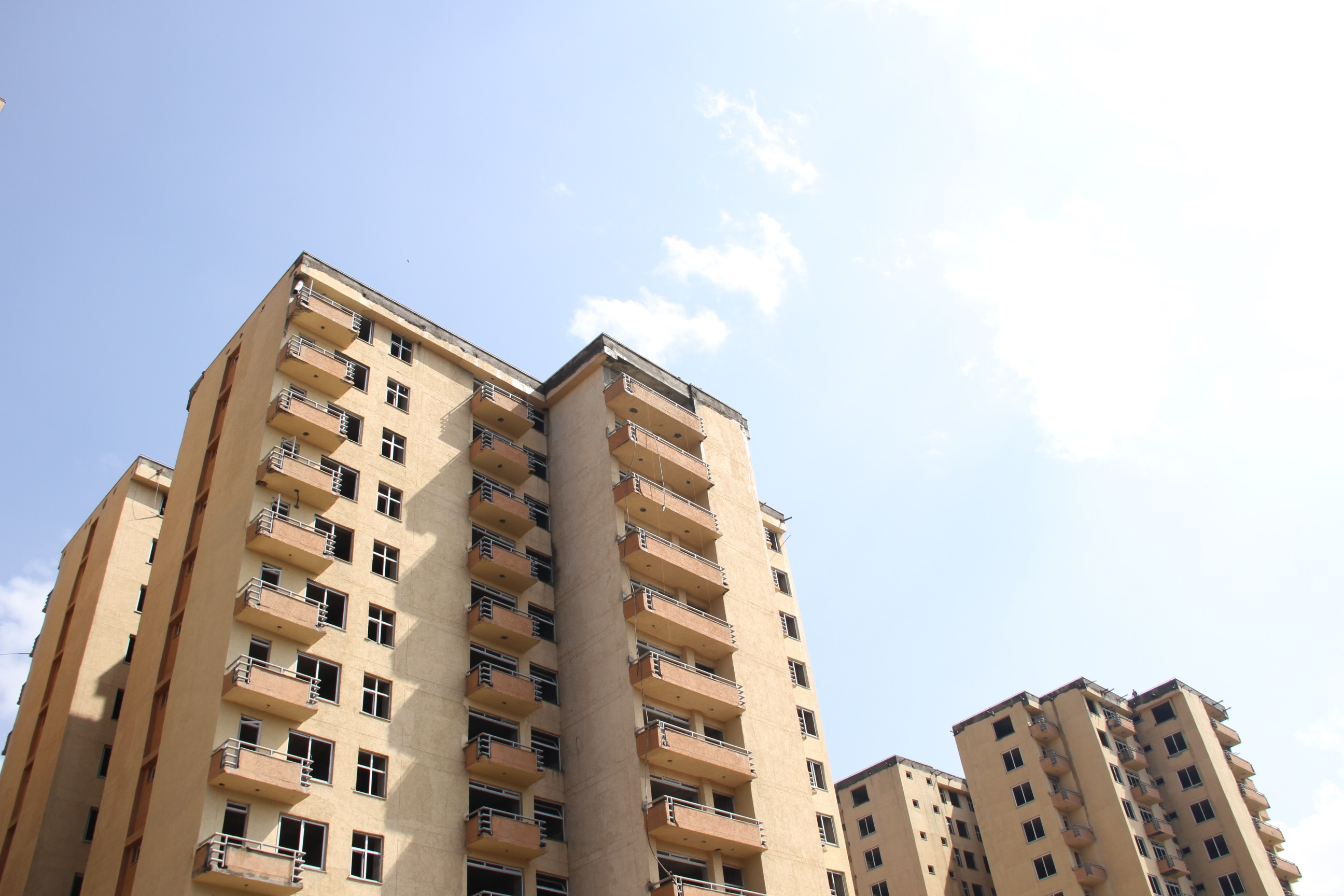
40/60 SENGATERA Affordable Housing Project

ETG was responsible for the design and contract administration of Adama stadium, an 80,000-seat stadium with a budget of 1.7 billion ETB ($82 million). In addition, ETG was the contract administrator and supervisor for the expansion of St. Paul's maternity and children hospital and St. Paul's Hospital Millennium Medical College Construction Project. The projects had an approximate budget of 178 million ETB. Another ETG Project is Allana Meat Processing Plant, built on 75 hectares of land in Adami Tulu area in Ziway town approximately 160 km (99 mi) from Addis Ababa. The company also undertook a project by the Federal Housing Corporation which included 8 buildings in various sites totaling 435 apartment houses. The project's stated budget was 1.8 billion ETB.
