= Dugda (Aanaa) =

District in Oromia Region, Ethiopia

Coordinates: 8°10′N 38°50′E

Dugda is a district in the Oromia Region of Ethiopia. It was part of the former district of Dugda Bora before being divided into Bora and Dugda. Part of the East Shewa Zone located in the Great Rift Valley, Dugda is bordered on the southeast by Hora-Dambal, on the south by Adami Tullu and Jido Kombolcha, on the west by the Southern Nations, Nationalities and Peoples Region, on the northwest by the Southwest Shewa Zone, on the north by the Awash River which separates it from Ada'a Chukala, on the northeast by Koka Reservoir which separates it from Adama, and on the east by the Arsi Zone. The administrative center of Dugda is Meki.

== Overview ==
The altitude of this district ranges from 1500 to 2300 meters above sea level; Mount Bora Mariam (2007 meters) is the highest point. Rivers include the Meki. A survey of the land in this district shows that 36.9% is arable or cultivable, 8.7% pasture, 9.6% forest, 0.4% swampy and the remaining 44.3% is considered degraded or otherwise unusable. Fruits and vegetables are important cash crops.

Industry in the district includes 11 licensed mines, 32 small industries employing 54 people (94% of which performed food processing), as well as 707 registered businesses including 108 wholesalers, 404 retailers and 195 service providers. There were 54 Farmers Associations with 18,946 members and 2 Farmers Service Cooperatives with 2226 members. Dugda Bora has 85 kilometers of dry-weather and 122 of all-weather road, for an average road density of 142 kilometers per 1000 square kilometers. About 67% of the rural, 100% of the urban and 74% of the total population has access to drinking water.

In late August 2005, the Awash and Meki rivers burst their banks due to heavy rains and flooded Dugda Bora. According to reports, up to 7,000 people were made homeless, one person was killed, many livestock were swept away and more than 814 hectares of farmland was destroyed. It was also reported that up to 3,400 of those displaced were stranded by the floodwaters, and authorities rescued 455 people.

== Demographics ==
The 2007 national census reported a total population for this woreda of 144,910, of whom 74,561 were men and 70,349 were women; 36,252 or 25.02% of its population were urban dwellers. The majority of the inhabitants said they practised Ethiopian Orthodox Christianity, with 91.32% of the population reporting they observed this belief, while 3.88% of the population were Protestant, 2.13% of the population were Muslim, and 1.36% of the population practiced traditional beliefs.

Based on figures published by the Central Statistical Agency in 2005, this woreda has an estimated total population of 196,323, of whom 96,849 are men and 99,474 are women; 50,126 or 25.53% of its population are urban dwellers, which is less than the Zone average of 32.1%. With an estimated area of 1,459.53 square kilometers, Dugda Bora has an estimated population density of 134.5 people per square kilometer, which is less than the Zone average of 181.7.

The 1994 national census reported a total population for this woreda of 134,454, of whom 68,105 were men and 66,349 women; 28,030 or 20.85% of its population were urban dwellers at the time. The five largest ethnic groups reported in Dugda Bora were the Oromo (72.78%), the Soddo Gurage (13.13%), the Amhara (8.28%), the Silt'e (1.18%), and the Sebat Bet Gurage (0.92%); all other ethnic groups made up 3.71% of the population. Oromiffa was spoken as a first language by 68.14%, 15.65% spoke Amharic, and 12.58% spoke Soddo; the remaining 3.63% spoke all other primary languages reported. The majority of the inhabitants were Ethiopian Orthodox Christianity, with 94.94% of the population reporting they practiced that belief, while 2.32% of the population said they were Moslem, 1.27% practiced traditional beliefs, and 0.75% were Catholic.
