= Bate Urgessa =

Ethiopian politician (1982/1983 – 2024)

- Born: 1982/1983
- Died: 10 April 2024 (aged 40–41); Meki, Oromia Region, Ethiopia
- Cause of death: Assassination from gunshot wound
- Known for: Oromo Liberation Front (OLF) critic
- Political party: OLF

Bate Urgessa (1982/1983 – 10 April 2024) was an Ethiopian politician who was Oromo Liberation Front (OLF) opposition leader and critic of the incumbent Abiy Ahmed government. He was jailed on several occasions. He was assassinated by gunshot in Meki, Oromia Region on 10 April 2024.

== Death ==
Urgessa was shot dead in Meki, East Shewa Zone in Oromia Region on 10 April 2024. His death met with public outrage on social media. Family members told Addis Standard, people who "looked like government security forces" took him from his hotel room on Tuesday night. The Oromia government denied its alleged involvement in his assassination. The OLF condemned his assassination as "brutal murder" and said he was "eloquent, brave and selfless Oromo soul". The Ethiopian Human Rights Commission (EHRC) Chief Commissioner Daniel Bekele stated on Twitter that the federal authorities need "to hold perpetrators to account". Phone lines were cut off in the town. In Oromia, police arrested 13 suspects over the murder. The United States, United Kingdom and European Union called for open investigation of the assassination.
