= Kone (volcano) =

Volcano in Ethiopia

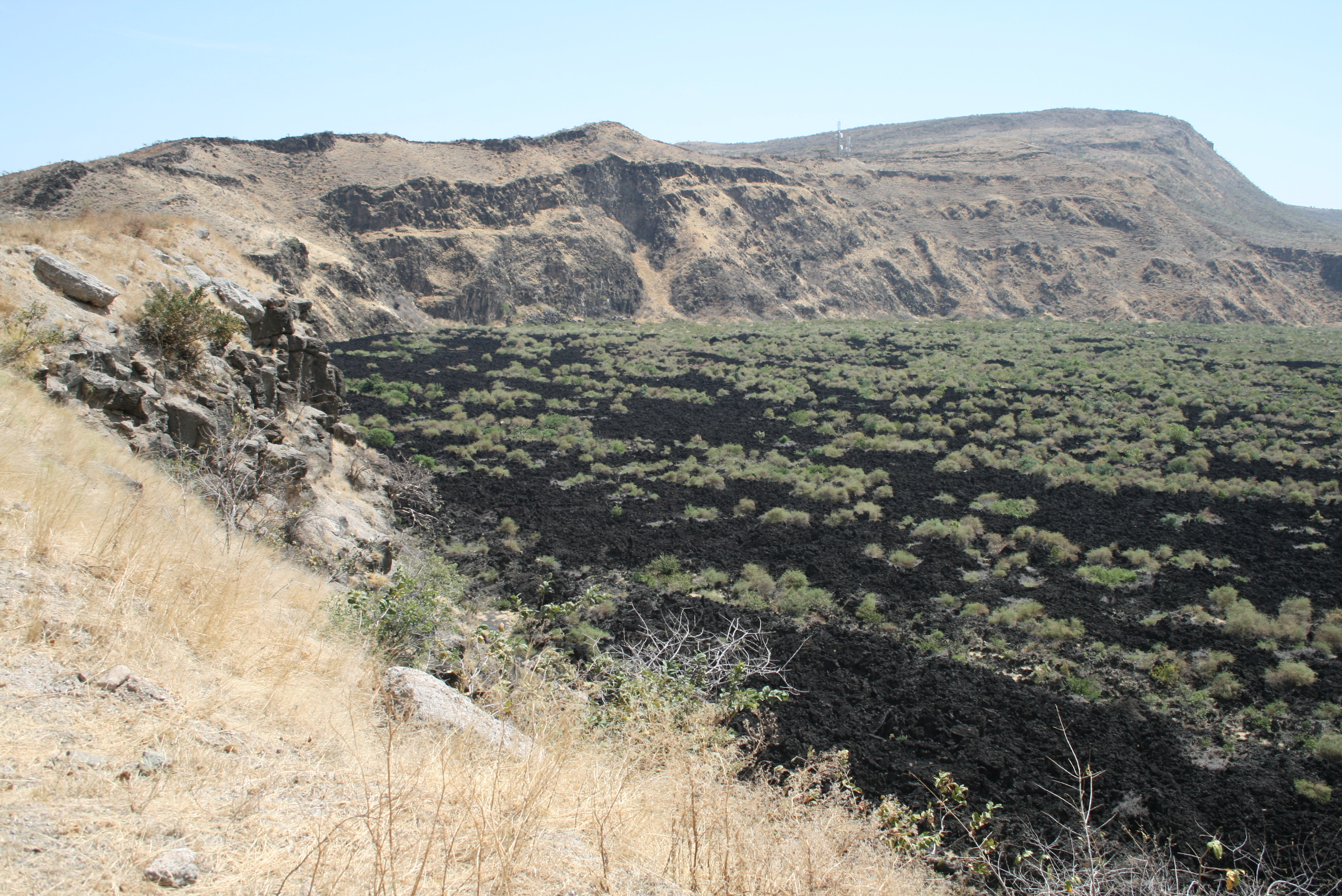
- caldera of Kone volcano

Highest point
- Elevation: 1,619 m (5,312 ft)
- Coordinates: 8°48′0″N 39°41′30″E

Geography
- Location within Ethiopia
- Location: Ethiopia

Geology
- Mountain type: Calderas
- Last eruption: 1820 ± 10 years

Kone is a volcano located in the Oromia region of Ethiopia. It is located on the Main Ethiopian Rift, which belongs to the most northern branch of the East African Rift Valley. Borchotto, the nearest town to Kone, is 5 kilometers away, and the capital of Ethiopia, Addis Ababa, is situated 160 kilometers to the west. The nearest volcano is Mount Fentale located 30 kilometers to the northwest, with the Boseti Gudo Volcano further away to the southeast. Kone takes up an area of about 647.5 square kilometers and has an elevation of 1619 meters.

== History of eruptions ==
The complex tectonic history within Ethiopia has made the eruption history of Kone difficult to interpret from its stratigraphic sequence. From the stratigraphy, four volcanic sequences of eruption can be determined: three Silicic phases, and then a basalt phase. The most recent basalt phase is dated around 1820. This date corresponds to local legends of the eruption, and the lack of vegetation growth on the lava flows provides further evidence of this eruption.

== Geology ==
Kone, also called Gariboldi, is made up of seven nested calderas, lava flows and basaltic cinder cones. (Not to be confused with the Garibaldi Volcanic Belt in Northern America.) There are two fault lines that have caused the volcanic activity within Kone, normal faults, which are part of the Wonji fault belt and ring fractures. The normal faults cause magma to rise inducing the volcanic activity. The ring fractures have caused the calderas collapse. Both of these faults have caused activity within Kone's recent history. The calderas widths can range from 1.5 to 5 km.

There are many rock types identified at Kone and they are divided into five main groups, trachytes, comenditic rhyolites, ignimbrites, pumices, syenite inclusions and basalts. Trachytes and comenditic rhyolites form the main volume of the rock in the Complex. The ignimbrites have formed massive green sheets ranging in thickness from 15 cm to 25 m. The pumice deposits over the ground are common within Kone's Volcanic Complex and range in thickness from 50 cm to 20 m. Most of the pumice is found interlocked with the ignimbrites. There have been three basalt lava types identified at Kone, aphyric basalt, olivine basalt and a third basalt which contains large phenocrysts of olivine, augite and plagioclase. These different rock types provide evidence for different eruptive phases. Kone is unusual due to the number of calderas in the Volcanic Complex, Fentale contains only one calderas in comparison.

== Renaming ==
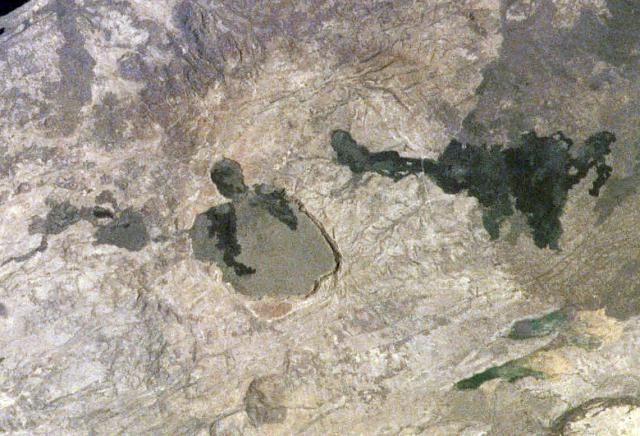
Satellite image of Kone volcanic complex

Kone's name is a recent addition taken from a local tribal word. The historical name of Kone was Gariboldi, named according to a local legend. The story tells about an engineer who was responsible for building a road through two of the collapsed calderas, thereby connecting Addis Ababa to Djibouti during the 1940s.
