= Awash National Park =

National park in Ethiopia

- IUCN category II (national park)
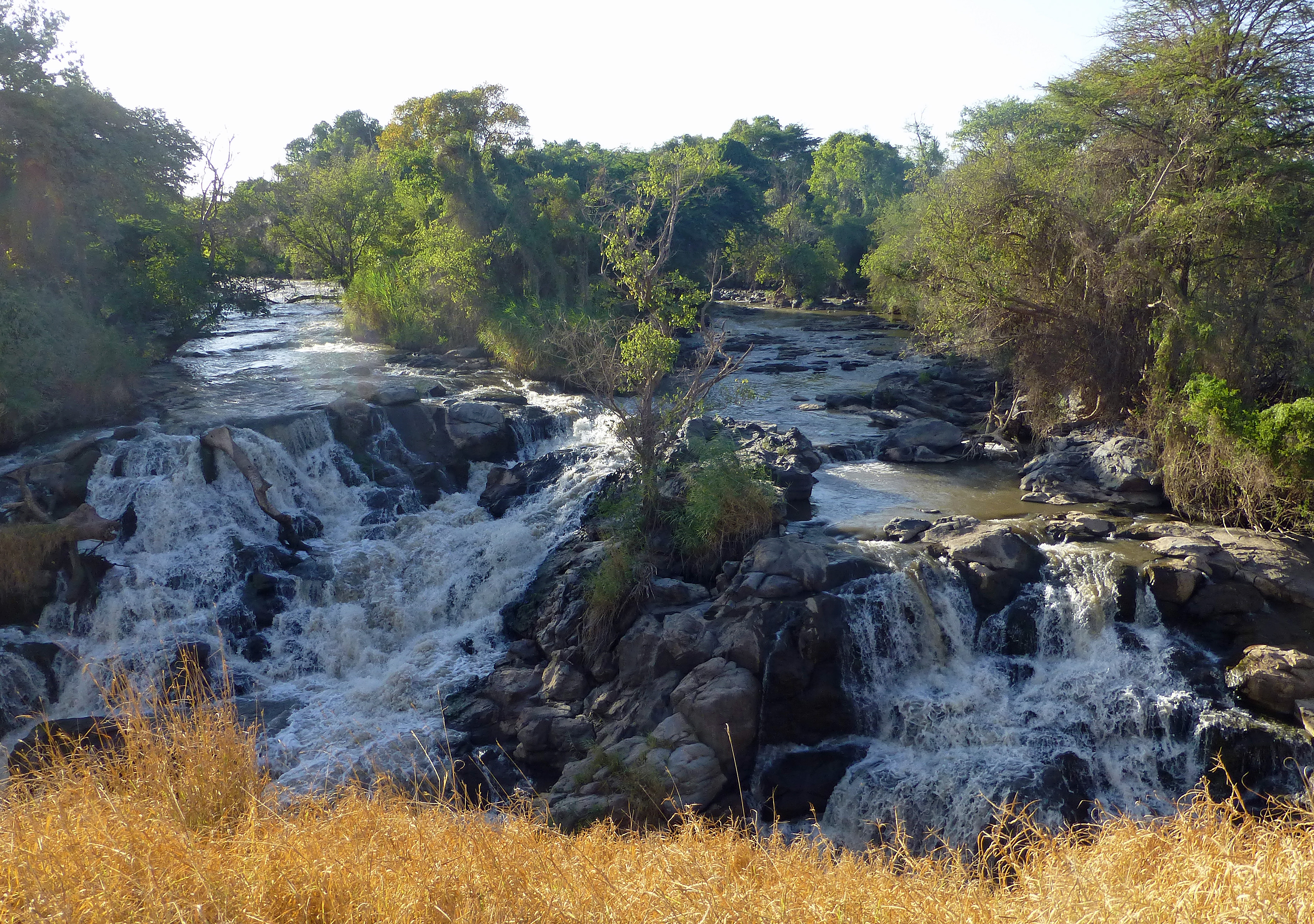
- Awash River

- Location within Ethiopia
- Location: Ethiopia
- Nearest city: Adama (145 KM)
- Coordinates: 9°08′33″N 40°0′0.00″E
- Area: 850 km^{2} (330 sq mi)
- Established: 1966
- Governing body: Ethiopian Wildlife Conservation Authority

Awash National Park is a national park in Ethiopia. Located at the border of Oromia state and Afar state, the park covers an area of 827 km^{2} (319 sq mi), most of it lies at an altitude of 900 m (3,000 ft). Spanning across the southern tip of the Afar Region and the northeastern corner of the East Shewa Zone of Oromia, this park is 225 km (140 mi) east of Addis Ababa (and a few kilometers west of Awash and east of Metehara).

The park is best known for its rich biodiversity and rural landscapes.

The region is subject to a bimodal rainfall pattern a rainy season followed by a dominant dry season which can last up to 10 months.

== History ==
The Awash National Park was established in 1966, although the act authorizing its creation was not passed completely for another three years. In establishing this park, as well as the Metehara Sugar Plantation to the south, the livelihoods of the indigenous Karayyu Oromo people have been endangered — an effect that is contrary to the Ethiopian government's original intention of these establishments serving to benefit the local population.

== Geography ==
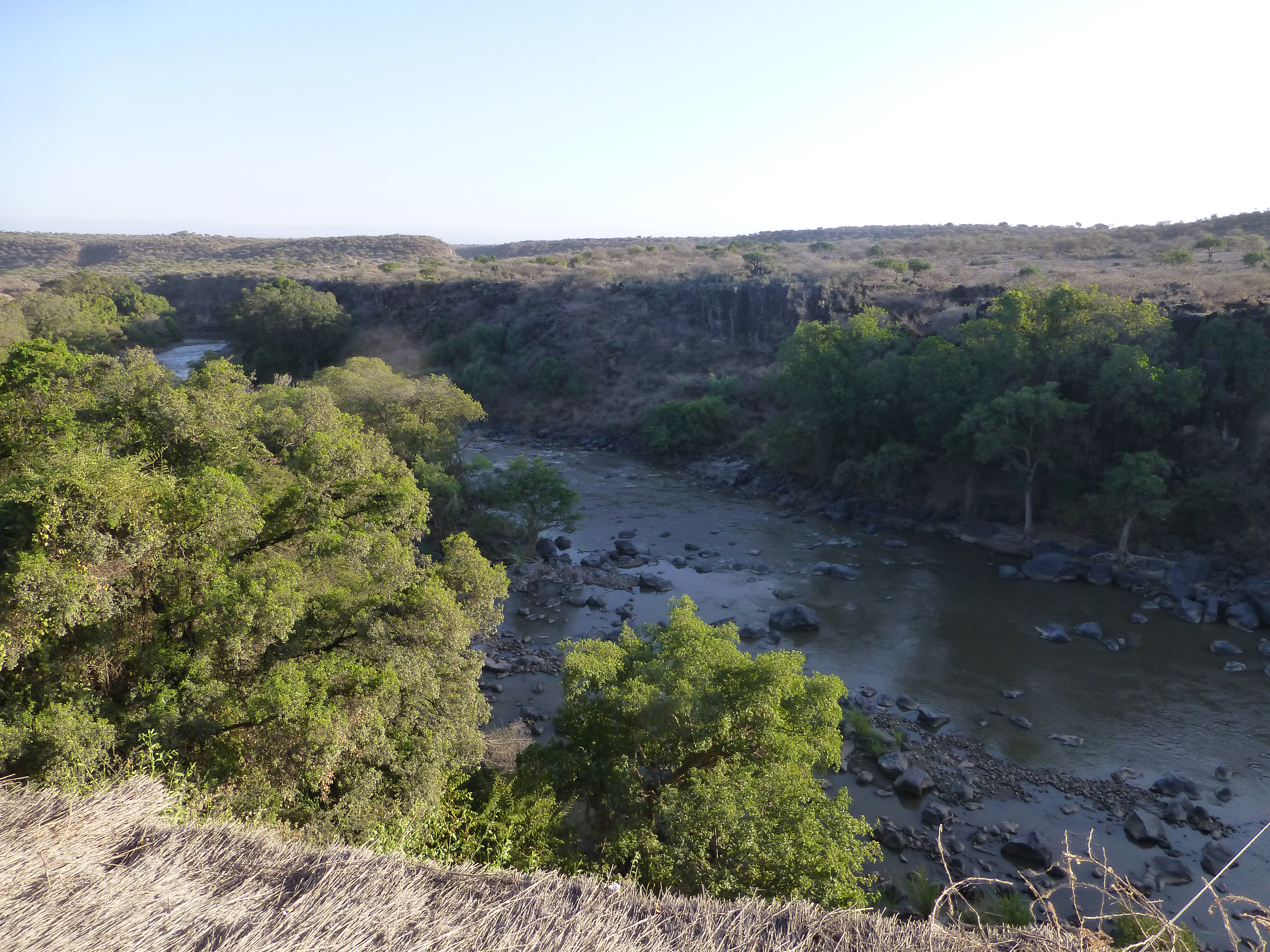
Awash River located south of Awash National Park

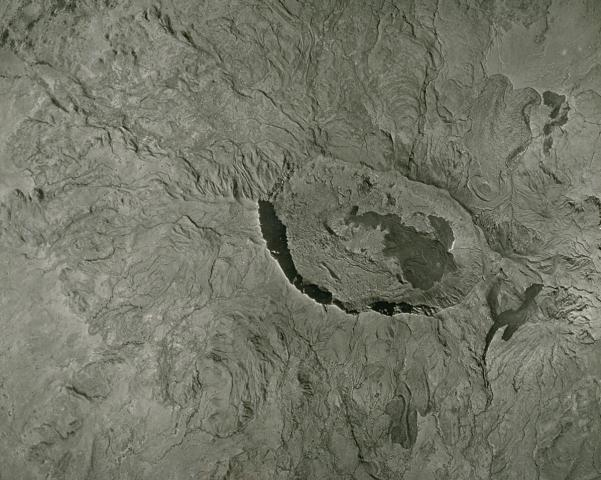
The satellite view of Mount Fentale

Along with its southern boundary along the Awash River, Awash National Park covers 850 km^{2} (330 sq mi) of acacia woodland and grassland. The Addis Ababa – Dire Dawa highway passes through this park, separating the Illala Saha Plains to the south from the Kudu Valley to the north. Further south of the park, the Awash River gorge has amazing waterfalls such as the Awash Falls. In the upper Kudu Valley at Filwoha are hot springs amid groves of palm trees thrive at the river bed. The park is home to Mount Fentale, a dormant stratovolcano which is located in the western area of Awash National Park at an altitude of 2,007 m (6,585 ft) above sea level.

== Ecology ==
=== Flora ===
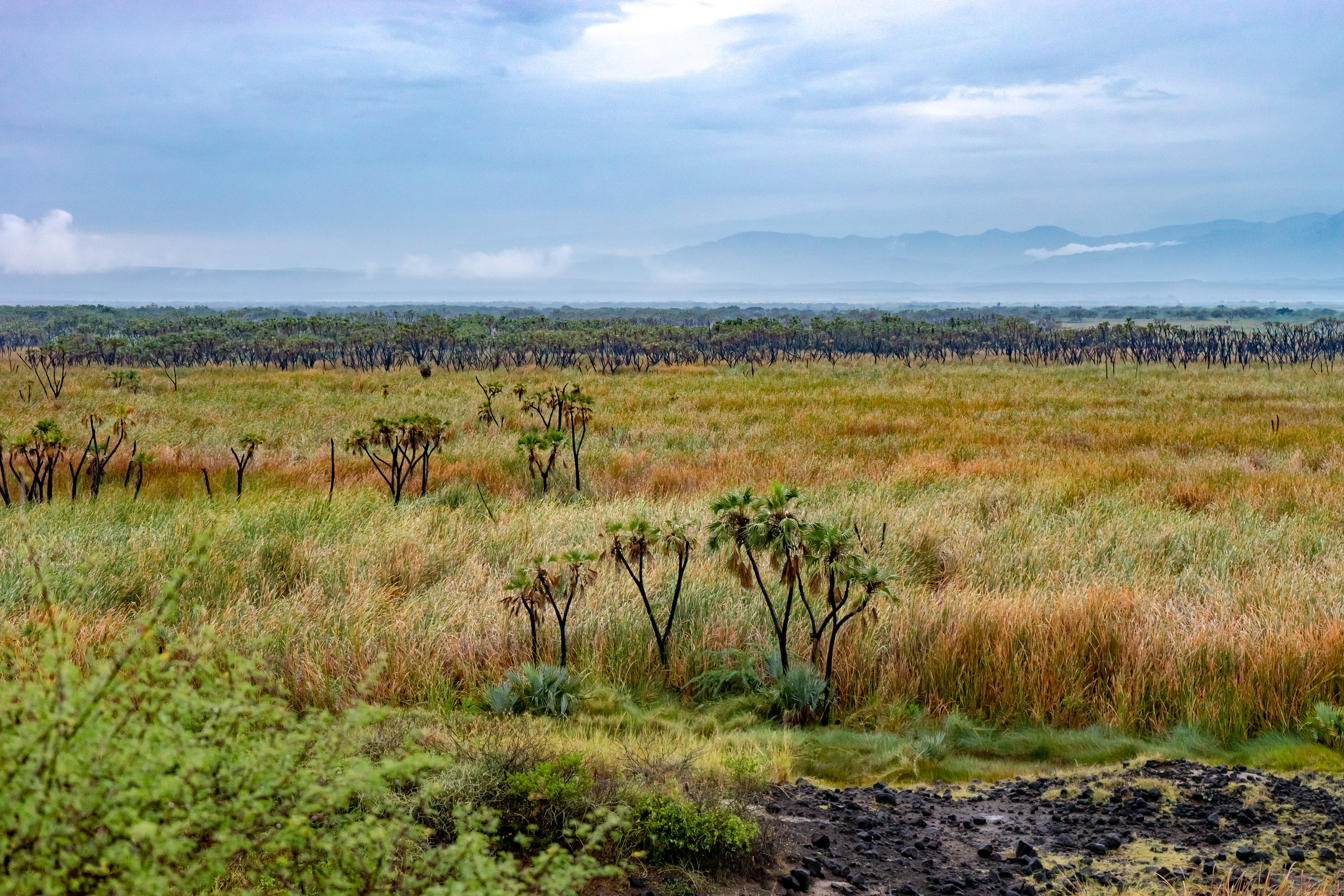
The Filwoha biome habitat of Awash National Park

Awash national park's vegetation is classified into four ecosystems: arid Acacia woodlands, thorned bushlands, grazing savannas, and diverse riverine wetlands. Doum palm trees and Desert date trees are found scattered across the Filwoha and Doha sites of Awash National Park, which provides a suitable niche for all mammalian, avian, and reptilian species.

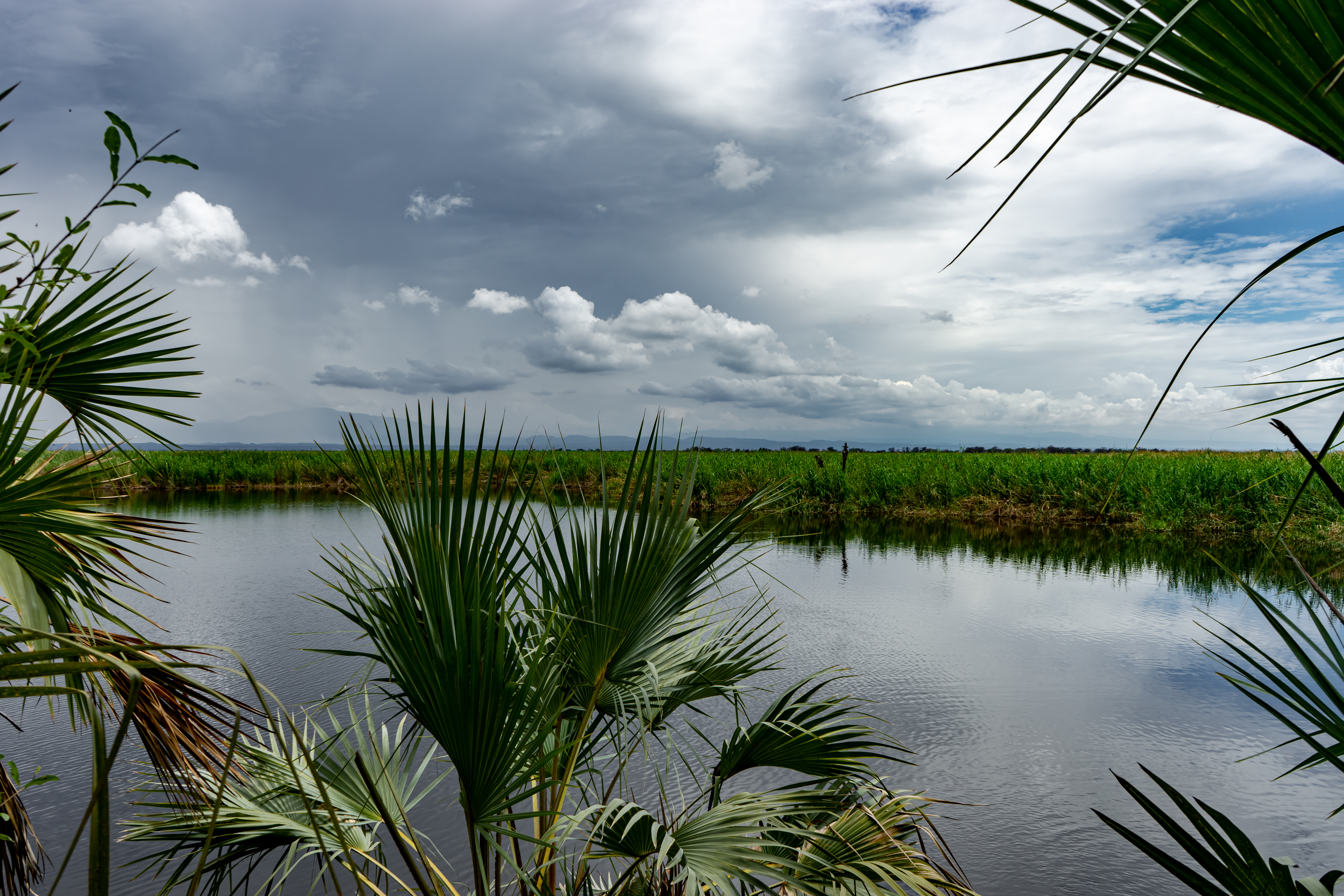
The Hot spring lake near Doho Lodge resort.

=== Fauna ===
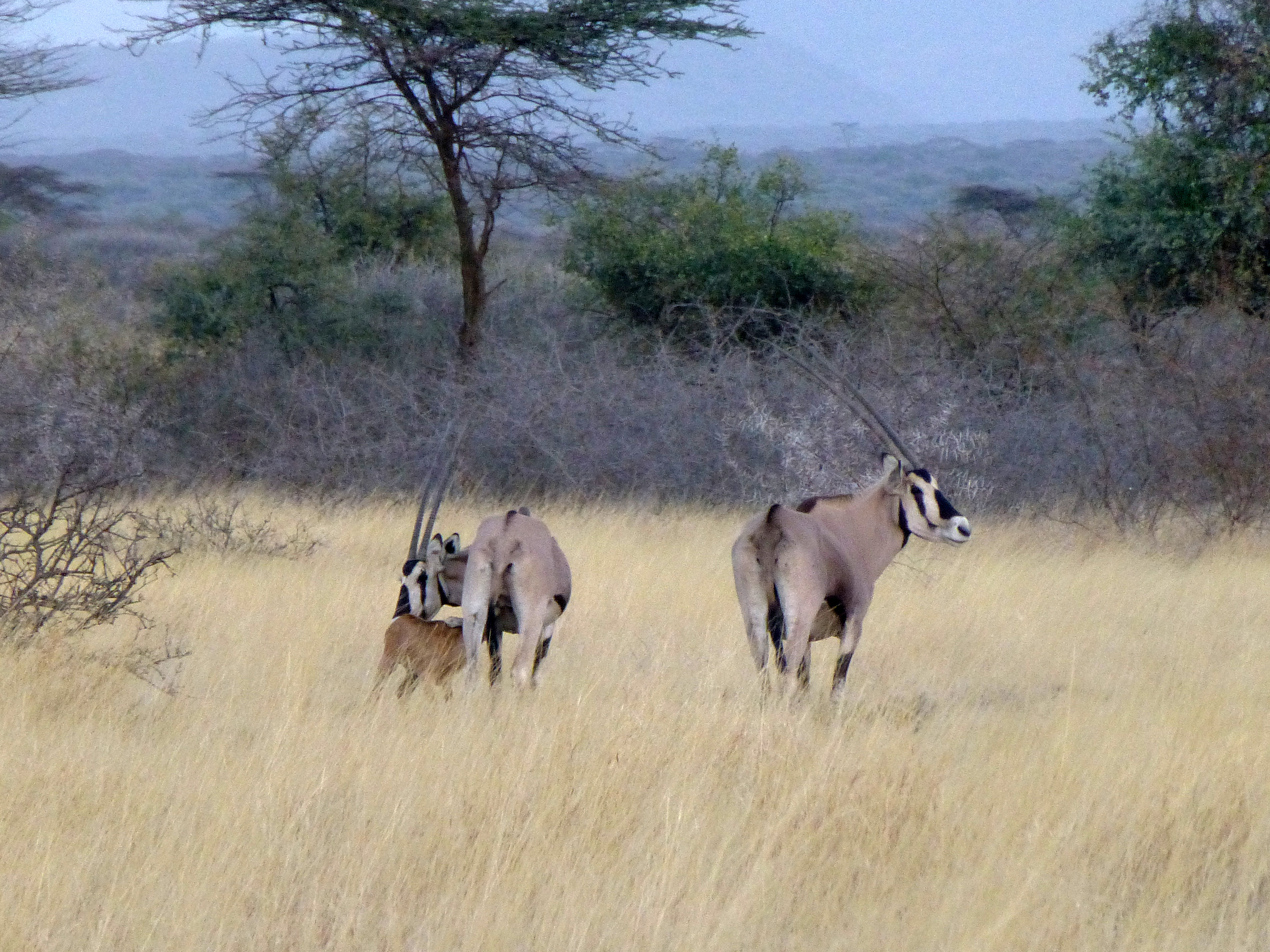
East African oryx in the national park

==== Mammals and reptiles ====
Awash National Park is home to more than 81 species of mammals and 43 species of reptiles. Beisa oryxes are common here for their populations. Other species that live within these park ecoregions include Aardvarks, Aardwolves, caracals, servals, hippopotamuses, Crested porcupines, Spotted hyenas, Striped hyenas, lions, leopards, cheetahs, Soemmerring's gazelles, Defassa waterbucks, Spotted-necked otters, Rock hyraxes, klipspringers, Salt's dik-diks, lesser kudus, greater kudus, and warthogs. Swayne's hartebeests were translocated to Awash National Park for repopulation, but their presence is left uncertain due to their population decline and environmental change. Primates of Awash National Park, such as Olive baboons, guerezas, grivets, and hamadryas baboons are abundantly common throughout the park's ecosystems. Animals such as elephants, rhinos, zebras, and Cape buffalo were once presented since the 1960s but were now extirpated because of hunting, population decline, and habitat loss.

Nile crocodiles are found in Awash river valleys and gorges while Rock pythons are found in riverine forests and hot spring oases. Leopard tortoises are rarely seen on savanna grassland and dry thickets for feeding, which is the only tortoise species listed here. Venomous snakes, such as Saw-scaled viper (Echis carinatus pyramidum), Puff adder (Bitis arietans somalica), Rhombic night-adder (Causus rhombeatus), Black mamba (Dendroaspis polylepis antinori), Eastern pallid spitting cobra (Naja mossambica pallida), and Black-necked spitting cobra (Naja nigricollis), are frequently found within the park ecosystems that are considered dangerous for encountering them. Other reptile species such as geckos, skinks, agamas, snakes, and monitors are frequently diverse in arid scrublands and riverine wetlands.

==== Avifauna ====
The park also contains 453 species of native birds which includes Somali ostriches, Lappet-faced vultures, White-bellied go-away-birds, Crested francolins, White-headed buffalo weavers, Chestnut-headed sparrow-larks, Northern carmine bee-eaters, Kori bustards, Abyssinian rollers, Abyssinian ground hornbills, Red-billed hornbill, and Brown snake-eagles. Wattled Ibis (Bostrychia carunculata), Black-winged lovebird (Agapornis taranta), Banded barbet (Lybiusun datus), Yellow-throated seedeater (Crithagra flavigula), Abyssinian woodpecker (Dendropicos abyssinicus), White-billed starling (Onychognathus albirostris), and Thick-billed raven (Corvus crassirostris) are 7 endemic species that are compromised within the park's biodiversity.

== See also ==
- Oromia Region
