= Boset =

Administrative division of Ethiopia

Coordinates: 8°40′N 39°30′E

Boset is one of the districts in the Oromia of Ethiopia. Part of the East Shewa Zone located in the Great Rift Valley, Boset is bordered on the south by the Arsi Zone, on the west by the Awash River which separates it from Adama, on the north by the Amhara Region, and on the east by Fentale. The administrative center of the woreda is Welenchiti; other towns in Boset include Bofe, Bole and Doni.

== Overview ==
This woreda is predominantly level land with undulating features; almost 90% is less than 1500 meters above sea level; Boset Guddo is the highest point. Rivers include the Tebo. A survey of the land in this woreda shows that 26.2% is arable or cultivable, 30% pasture, 15.8% forest, and the remaining 28% is considered barren, degraded or otherwise unusable. The Nura Era and Tibila State Farms are major agricultural centers. Fruits and vegetables are important cash crops.

Industry in the woreda includes 19 small scale industries that employed 28 people, as well as 576 legally registered business enterprises which include 69 wholesalers, 318 retailers and 189 service providers of differing types. There were 31 Farmers Associations with 6208 members and 7 Farmers Service Cooperatives with the same number of members. Boset has 97 kilometers of dry-weather and 103 of all-weather road, for an average of road density of 136.8 kilometers per 1000 square kilometers. About 87% of the urban, 36% of the rural and 45% of the total population have access to drinking water.

== Demographics ==
The 2007 national census reported a total population for this woreda of 142,112, of whom 73,925 were men and 68,187 were women; 26,514 or 18.66% of its population were urban dwellers. The majority of the inhabitants said they practiced Ethiopian Orthodox Christianity, with 60.57% of the population reporting they observed this belief, while 15.64% of the population were Muslim, 14.45% of the population practiced traditional beliefs, and 8.37% were Protestant.

Based on figures published by the Central Statistical Agency in 2005, this woreda has an estimated total population of 158,253, of whom 76,410 are men and 81,843 are women; 33,348 or 21.07% of its population are urban dwellers, which is less than the Zone average of 32.1%. With an estimated area of 1,461.88 square kilometers, Boset has an estimated population density of 108.3 people per square kilometer, which is less than the Zone average of 181.7.

The 1994 national census reported a total population for this woreda of 109,578, of whom 56,743 were men and 52,835 women; 18,641 or 17.01% of its population were urban dwellers at the time. The four largest ethnic groups reported in Boset were the Oromo (73.68%), the Amhara (20.74%), the Hadiya (1.75%), and the Welayta (0.95%); all other ethnic groups made up 2.88% of the population. Oromiffa was spoken as a first language by 71.58%, 25.63% spoke Amharic, and 1.02% spoke Hadiya; the remaining 1.77% spoke all other primary languages reported. The majority of the inhabitants were Ethiopian Orthodox Christianity, with 78.98% of the population reporting they practiced that belief, while 14.42% of the population said they were Moslem, 5.04% practiced traditional beliefs, and 1.08% were Protestant.
