= List of stadiums in Ethiopia =

This is a list of football (soccer) stadiums in Ethiopia, ranked in descending order of capacity with at least 5,000 spectators. Some stadiums are football-specific and some are used for other purposes.

== Current stadiums ==
#	Image	Stadium	Capacity	City	Home team(s)
1		Bahir Dar Stadium	52,000	Bahir Dar	National team Bahir Dar Kenema
2		Mekelle Stadium	45,000	Mekelle	Mekelle City FC; Dedebit FC; Guna Trading FC; Trans Ethiopia
3		Hawassa Kenema Stadium	40,000	Hawassa	National team Hawassa City
4		Yidnekatchew Tessema	20,000	Addis Ababa	National team Saint George; Ethiopian Coffee; Defence Force
5		Wollega Stadium	30,000	Nekemte	Nekemte City F.C
6		Mohammed Hussein Ali Al-Amoudi Stadium	25,155	Weldiya	Woldia
7		Mekelle University Arid Stadium	20,000	Mekelle	
8		Dire Dawa Stadium	18,000	Dire Dawa	Dire Dawa City
9		Hawassa University Stadium	15,000	Hawassa	Hawassa CIty F.C
10		Wonji Stadium	14,000	Wenji	Muger Cement, Wonji Sugar
11		Abebe Bikila Stadium	13,000	Addis Ababa	Dedebit F.C.
12		Addis Ababa Sports Complex Stadium	10,000	Addis Ababa	
13		Training Ground	10,000	Addis Ababa	
14		Imam Ahmed Stadium	10,000	Harar	Harar City F.C.
15		Abiy Hersamo Stadium	5,000	Hosaena	Hadiya Hossana F.C.
16		Arba Minch Stadium	5,000	Arba Minch	Arba Minch City F.C.

== Stadiums under construction ==
Stadium	Capacity	City	Home team	Status	Opening
Addis Ababa National Stadium	62,000	Addis Ababa	National team	Under Construction	2027
Harari Stadium	56,000	Harari	Harar City	Under Construction	
Gambella Stadium	30,000	Gambella		Under Construction	
Akaki-Kality Stadium	20,000	Addis Ababa	Saint George, Ethiopian Coffee	Under Construction	2026

== See also ==
- List of African stadiums by capacity
- List of association football stadiums by capacity
- List of association football stadiums by country
- List of sports venues by capacity
- List of stadiums by capacity
- Lists of stadiums
- Football in Ethiopia
- Wolaita Sodo Kingdom Stadium
