= Adami Tullu and Jido Kombolcha =

District located in Oromia state of Ethiopia

Coordinates: 7°45′N 38°40′E

Adami Tullu and Jido Kombolcha (Oromo: Adaamii tulluu fi jiido kombolcha) is one of the districts in the Oromia Region of Ethiopia. Part of the East Shewa Zone located in the Great Rift Valley, Adami Tullu and Jido Kombolcha is bordered on the south by West Arsi Zone with which it shares the shores of Lakes Abijatta and Langano, on the west by the Silte Zone of Southern Nations, Nationalities and Peoples Region, on the north by Dugda Bora, on the northeast by Hora-Dambal, and on the east by the Arsi Zone. The main town of district is Adami Tullu; other towns include Abosa, Bulbulla, and Jido.

== Overview ==
Most of this district ranges in altitude from 1500 to 2300 meters above sea level; Mount Aluto is the highest point. Rivers include the Bulbula, Jido, Hora Kalio and Gogessa. A survey of the land in this district shows that 27.2% is arable or cultivable, 21.6% pasture, 9.9% forest, 15.7% swampy and the remaining 25.6% is considered degraded or otherwise unusable.

Industry in the district includes two state-owned industries (one producing Soda ash, the other Caustic soda), 44 private small industries employing 299 people, and 1,670 registered businesses including 321 wholesalers, 1034 retailers and 315 service providers. Batu State Farm is a major on-going government project in this district. There were 37 Farmers Associations with 17,144 members and 12 Farmers Service Cooperatives with 8740 members. Adami Tullu and Jido Kombolcha has 95 kilometers of dry-weather and 85 all-weather road, for an average road density of 141 kilometers per 1000 square kilometers. About 84% of the rural, 88% of the urban and 85% of the total population have access to drinking water. In October 2009, district authorities announced that 4,300 hectares of land was being developed for irrigation, involving over 2,000 farmers who would plant the land in various fruits and vegetables, which could then be harvested more than twice a year.

== Demographics ==
The 2007 national census reported a total population for this district of 141,405, of whom 71,167 were men and 70,238 were women; 20,923 or 14.8% of its population were urban dwellers. The majority of the inhabitants were Muslim, with 82.65% of the population reporting they observed this belief, while 11.61% of the population said they practiced Ethiopian Orthodox Christianity, and 5.09% of the population were Protestant.

Based on figures published by the Central Statistical Agency in 2005, this district has an estimated total population of 167,066, of whom 82,926 are men and 84,140 are women; 57,068 or 34.16% of its population are urban dwellers, which is greater than the Zone average of 32.1%. With an estimated area of 1,274.54 square kilometers, Adami Tullu and Jido Kombolcha has an estimated population density of 131.1 people per square kilometer, which is less than the Zone average of 181.7.

The 1994 national census reported a total population for this district of 111,926, of whom 55,969 were men and 55,957 women; 31,869 or 28.47% of its population were urban dwellers at the time. The five largest ethnic groups reported in Adama were the Oromo (78.69%), the Amhara (8.53%), the Soddo Gurage (2.87%), the Silt'e (2.81%), and the Sebat Bet Gurage (1.19%); all other ethnic groups made up 5.81% of the population. Oromiffa was spoken as a first language by 76.05%, 16.09% spoke Amharic, and 2.2% spoke Silt'e; the remaining 5.66% spoke all other primary languages reported. The majority of the inhabitants were Moslem, with 72.37% of the population reporting they practiced that belief, while 23.43% of the population said they were Ethiopian Orthodox Christianity, and 3.79% were Protestant.
