= Sodere =

Spa town in Oromia Region, Ethiopia

Sodere ሶደሬ
- Town
- Location within Ethiopia
- Coordinates: 8°24′N 39°23′E
- Country: Ethiopia
- Region: (Oromia Region) Oromia
- Zone: East Shewa
- Elevation: 1,466 m (4,810 ft)

Population (2005)
  - Total: 1,867
- Time zone: UTC+3 (EAT)

Sodere (Oromo: Sodaree) a spa town in central Ethiopia. Located approximately 25 kilometres south of Adama and 120 kilometres southeast of Addis Ababa in the East Shewa Zone of the Oromia Region, this town has a latitude and longitude of 8°24′N 39°23′E with an elevation of 1466 metres above sea level. It is one of five settlements in Nannawa Adama.

Sodere lies alongside the Awash River and features lush, shady vegetation. Vervet monkeys and warthogs live on the resort grounds. Crocodiles and, less frequently, hippos may be seen in the nearby Awash River.

== The spa facilities ==
The hot springs resort, popular for its therapeutic effects, is located outside the town. An Olympic size swimming pool, reportedly empty during the week, is a popular draw for weekenders from Addis Ababa. Other features include a full-service restaurant, and a hotel and conference center.

The resort was developed by the Ethiopian government, and was in operation by 1963. During the mid-1990s, Sodere was the site of peace talks between several factions vying for control of Somalia. The journalist Abdullahi Dool commented that "Any serious Somali who reads the outcome of this last meeting at the Ethiopian resort or the previous ones, would just laugh at the names and clan organizations these people are said to 'represent'."

== Demographics ==
Based on figures from the Central Statistical Agency in 2005, Sodere has an estimated total population of 1,867 of whom 992 are men and 875 were women. The 1994 national census reported this town had a total population of 1,042 of whom 538 were men and 504 women.
