= Wegagen Bank Headquarters =

High-rise building in Addis Ababa, Ethiopia

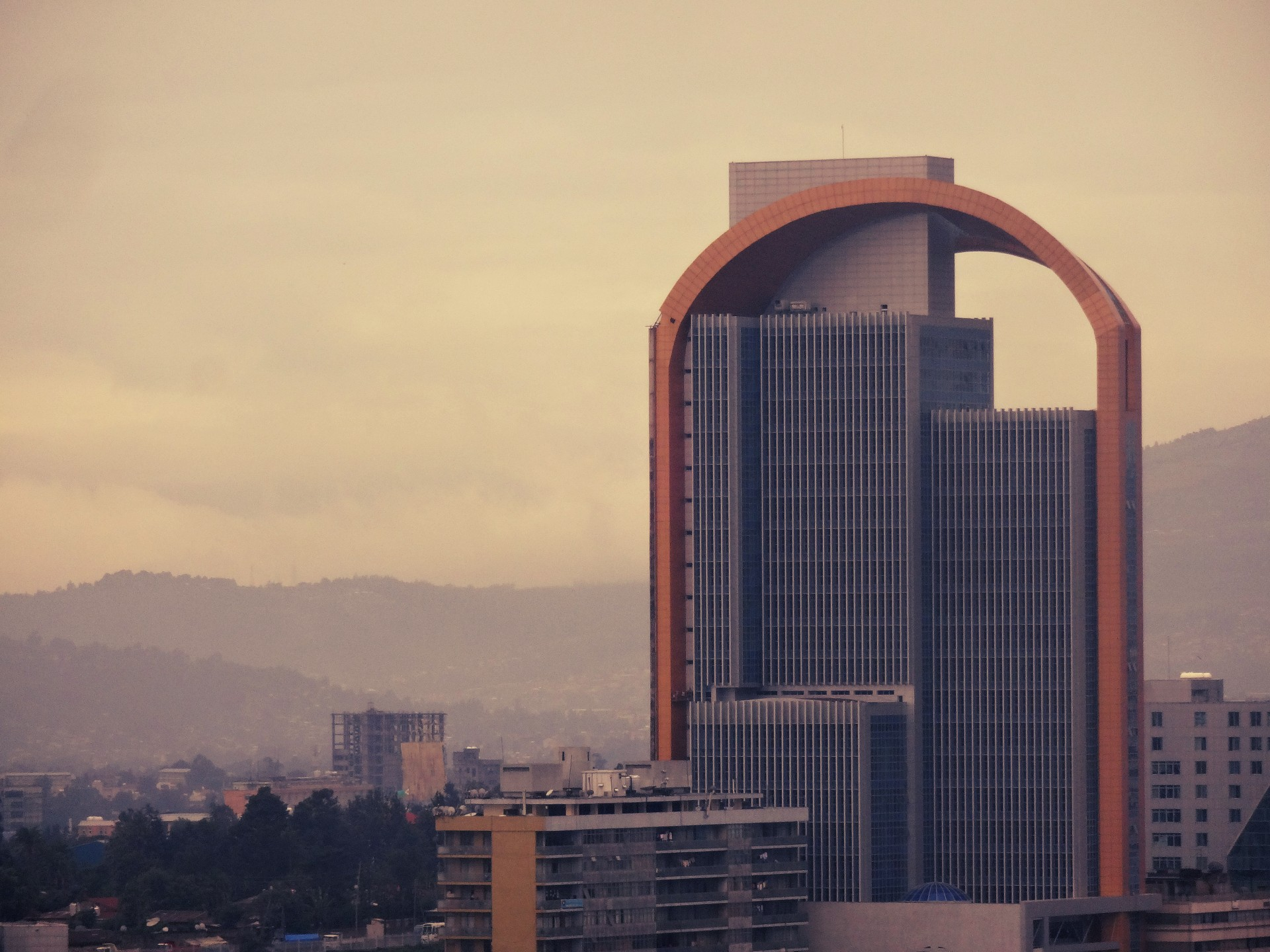
- Interactive map of the Wegagen Bank Headquarters area

General information
- Type: High-rise building
- Location: Ras Mekonnen Street, Addis Ababa, Ethiopia
- Coordinates: 9.011762°N 38.756045°E
- Construction started: 2013
- Inaugurated: 30 September 2017
- Renovation cost: 805,000,000 ETB
- Operator: Wegagen Bank

Height
- Height: 107 m (351 ft 1/2 in)

Technical details
- Lifts/elevators: 8

Design and construction
- Main contractor: ETG Designers and Consultants

Website
- www.wegagen.com

The Wegagen Bank Headquarters is a high-rise building and the headquarters of Wegagen Bank in Addis Ababa, Ethiopia. The most noticeable building in Addis Ababa's skyline, the building was inaugurated on 30 September 2017 after construction began in 2013, and has 107 meters height lying in 1,800 square meters in Ras Mekonnen Street near Addis Ababa National Stadium.

== Overview ==
The building construction began around 2013 and the building took 800 million birr cost and lies in 1,800 square meters with eight elevators that expected to carry 88 individuals. The design and project was undertaken by local company, ETC Designers and Consultants, and structural design outsourced by foreign consultant MH Engineering PLC as the project construction led by China Jiagxi Corporation for International Economic and Technical Cooperation. Wegagen Bank inaugurated its 23 storey headquarters building on 30 September 2017, with high-ranking governmental official presented in the opening ceremony. President Mulatu Teshome remarked statement in its inaugurated ceremony that it demonstrates banking growth and serves as symbol of transformation of Addis Ababa. Similarity, the chairman of the bank Teferi Zewdu noted that it signifies the success of the bank over 20 years. Teferi also envisioned the bank would achieve within top ten banks in 2025.

Located in front of Addis Ababa National Stadium on Ras Mekonnen Street, the building is the most recognized landmark in the city metropolitan area, with 107 meters height.
