= Nannawa Adama =

District in Oromia Region, Ethiopia

Coordinates: 8°20′N 39°15′E

Nannawa Adama (Oromo: Naannawa Adaamaa; Amharic: አዳማ ዙሪያ ) is a woreda in Oromia Region, Ethiopia. Part of the East Shewa Zone located in the Great Rift Valley, Adama Zuria is bordered on the south by the Arsi Zone, on the southwest by Koka Reservoir which separates it from Dugda Bora, on the west by Lome, on the north by the Amhara Region, and on the east by Boset; the Awash River, the only important river in this woreda, defines the woreda boundaries on the east and south. Other towns in this woreda include Awash Melkasa, Shewa Alemtena, Sire Robi, Sodere and Wenji Gefersa.

== Overview ==
The altitude of this woreda ranges from 1500 to 2300 meters above sea level. Notable local landmarks include the Sodere and Gergedi hot springs, and Boku Femoral. A survey of the land in this woreda shows that 30% is arable or cultivable, 6.5% pasture, 5.2% forest, and the remaining 58.3% is considered swampy, degraded or otherwise unusable. Fruits, vegetables and sugar cane are important cash crops.

Adama Zuria has a severe invasive species problem with Eichhornia crassipes, the water hyacinth. Locals believed the weed was introduced to the woreda through the 1996 flood of the Awash, which brought plants from the Koka Reservoir into both residential areas and the Wonji Sugar Plantation, where it has infested 116.4 hectares of irrigation structures, causing water loss, increased labor, and providing an environment that encourages malaria-carrying mosquitos and schistosomiasis.

Industry in the woreda includes 12 government-owned industries, and 192 small industries which employed a total of 1181 people. There were 41 Farmers Associations with 13,929 members and 10 Farmers Service Cooperatives with 8631 members. Adama Zuria has 18 kilometers of dry-weather road and 110 kilometers of all-weather road, for an average road density of 127 kilometers per 1000 square kilometers. About 24% of the rural, 100% of the urban and 69% of the total population has access to drinking water.

== Demographics ==
The 2007 national census reported a total population for this woreda of 155,349, of whom 79,013 were men and 76,336 were women; 26,322 or 16.94% of its population were urban dwellers. The majority of the inhabitants said they practised Ethiopian Orthodox Christianity, with 68.52% of the population reporting they observed this belief, while 13.01% of the population were Protestant, 10.44% of the population were Muslim, and 6.78% of the population practiced traditional beliefs.

Based on figures published by the Central Statistical Agency in 2005, this woreda has an estimated total population of 422,490, of whom 210,168 are men and 212,322 are women; 273,842 or 64.82% of its population are urban dwellers, which is greater than the Misraq Shewa Zone's average of 32.1%. With an estimated area of 1,007.66 square kilometers, Adama has an estimated population density of 419.3 people per square kilometer, which is greater than the Zone average of 181.7. It is considered the most populous woreda in the Misraq Shewa Zone.

The 1994 national census reported a total population for this woreda of 261,341, of whom 129,538 were men and 131,803 women; 153,134 or 58.60% of its population were urban dwellers at the time. The six largest ethnic groups reported in Adama were the Oromo (46.07%), the Amhara (31.6%), the Silt'e (4.54%), the Sebat Bet Gurage (4.05%), the Tigray (3.47%), and the Soddo Gurage (2.02%); all other ethnic groups made up 8.25% of the population. Amharic was spoken as a first language by 55.05%, 35.08% spoke Oromiffa, 2.43% Silt'e, 2.1% Sebat Bet Gurage, and 1.99% spoke Tigrinya; the remaining 1.88% spoke all other primary languages reported. The majority of the inhabitants were Ethiopian Orthodox Christianity, with 78.39% of the population reporting they practiced that belief, while 13.64% of the population said they were Moslem, 4.33% were Protestant, 1.85% were Catholic, and 1.32% practiced traditional beliefs.
