= Metehara =

Town in Oromia Region, Ethiopia

Metehara: መተሐራ (Amharic); Mataharaa (Oromo)
- Town
- Location within Ethiopia
- Coordinates: 8°54′N 39°55′E
- Country: Ethiopia
- Region: Oromia
- Zone: East Shewa
- Elevation: 947 m (3,107 ft)

Population (2005)
  - Total: 21,348
- Time zone: UTC+3 (EAT)

Metehara (Amharic: መተሐራ, Oromo: Mataharaa) is a town in central Ethiopia. Located in the East Shewa Zone of the Oromia Region, it has a latitude and longitude of 08°54′N 39°55′E with an elevation of 947 meters above sea level.

Access to Metehara includes a station on the Addis Ababa–Djibouti Railway. There is a Tuesday livestock market. Notable local landmarks include Metehara Mikael Bet church, Mount Fentale to the north, Awash National Park to the northeast, and Lake Basaka to the south of the town.

The town is inhabited by the Karrayyu Oromo, Afar, Somali Dir clans (Issa and Gadabuursi) and Amhara. and Berta

== History ==
Visitors to the area in the first decades of the 20th century frequently described the area as land between the Karrayyu Oromo, Afar, Somali Dir clans (Issa and Gadabuursi) and Amhara. Somali settlers from the Issa and Gadabuursi migrated to this region towards the end of the era of Emperor Menelik II. Later their numbers increased as relatives and kinsmen took permanent settlement there. On the eve of the Italian invasion, a German named Neitzel had been granted a concession to cultivate cotton and coffee. Despite that, few people lived in the area until the arrival of the Dutch corporation Handelsvereeningung Amsterdam (HVA), which established a factory to process sugar at Metehara, after it had been expelled from Indonesia in 1954.

In 1970, the Karrayyu Oromo staged an armed demonstration in Metehara which destroyed fences and buildings at the HVA plantation. The Derg announced 3 February 1975 that the sugar plantation, including the Dutch investments, would be fully nationalized.

During the 2002 drought, a Karrayyu Oromo leader was killed in Metehara, which increased tensions between the Karrayyu Oromo and Afar peoples. As a result the Afar, who traded at the Tuesday market, did not go to the market during that drought.

== Demographics ==
Based on figures from the Central Statistical Agency in 2005, Metehara has an estimated total population of 21,348 of whom 10,763 were men and 10,585 were women. The 1994 national census reported this town had a total population of 11,934 of whom 5,837 were males and 6,097 were females. It is the largest town in Fentale woreda.
