= Apostolic Vicariate of Meki =

Catholic missionary jurisdiction in Ethiopia

Apostolic Vicariate of Meki Vicariatus Apostolicus Mekviensis

Location
- Country: Ethiopia
- Metropolitan: Immediately subject to the Holy See

Statistics
- Area: 156,600 km^{2} (60,500 sq mi)
- Population: Total; Catholics: (as of 2004); 5,855,029; 22,467 (0.4%)

Information
- Rite: Latin Rite

Current leadership
- Bishop: Abraham Desta

Map
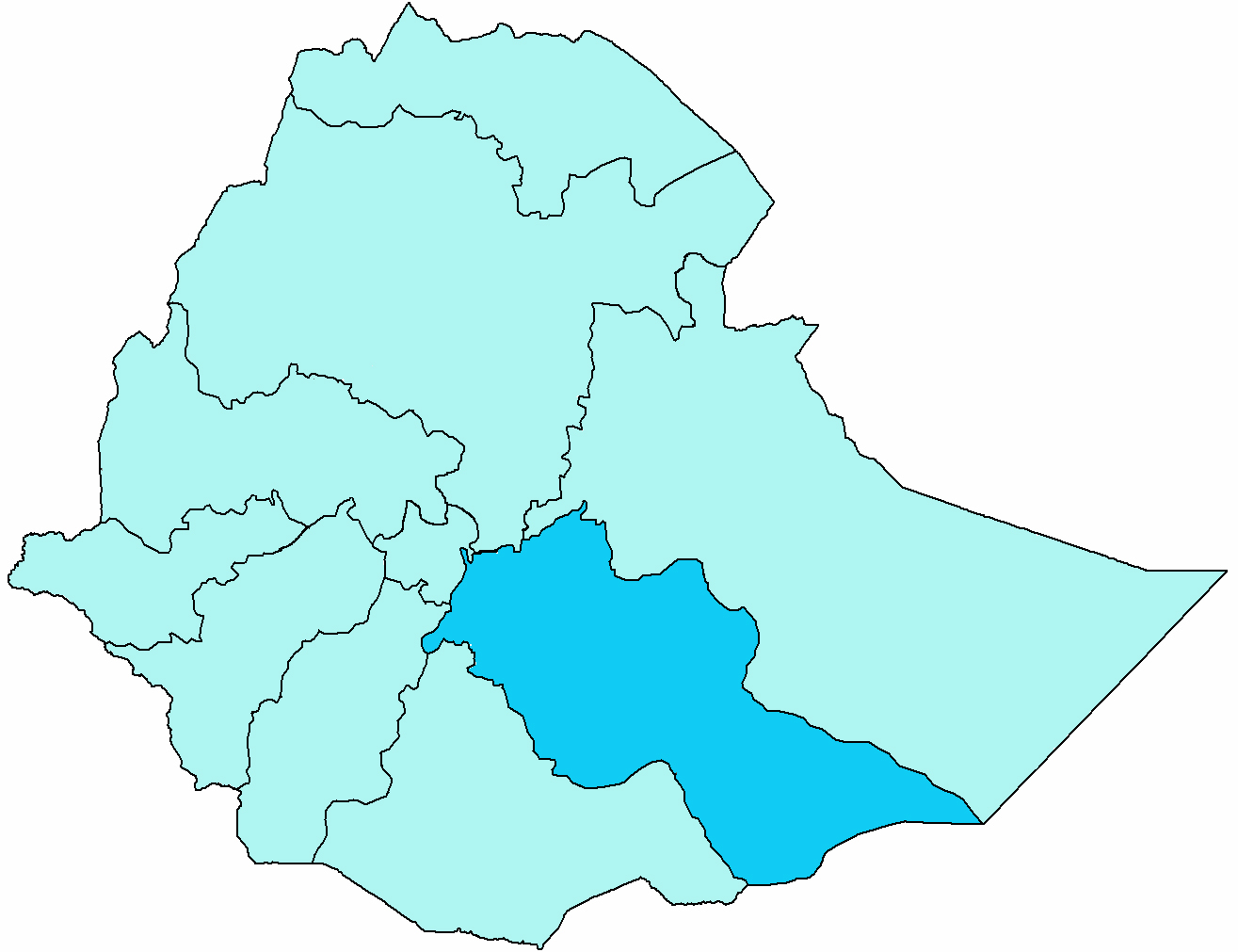

The Apostolic Vicariate of Meki (Latin: Vicariatus Apostolicus Mekviensis) is a Latin Catholic apostolic vicariate located in Meki, Ethiopia.

== History ==
- March 6, 1980: Established as Apostolic Prefecture of Meki from the Apostolic Vicariate of Harar
- December 21, 1991: Promoted as Apostolic Vicariate of Meki

== Bishops ==
=== Ordinaries ===
- Prefect Apostolic of Meki (Roman Rite)
  - Fr. Yohannes Woldegiorgis (later Bishop) (September 8, 1981 – December 21, 1991); see below
- Vicar Apostolics of Meki (Roman rite)
  - Bishop Yohannes Woldegiorgis (December 21, 1991 – September 19, 2002); see above
  - Bishop Abraham Desta (January 29, 2003 – present)

=== Other priest of this vicariate who became bishop ===
- Noel Seyoum Fransua, appointed Vicar Apostolic of Hosanna in 2017

== See also ==
- Meki Catholic School (MCS)
