= Welenchiti =

Welenchiti (Amharic: ወለንጭቲ) (also transliterated Wolenchite and Aualancheti) is a town in east-central Ethiopia. Located in the Misraq (East) Shewa Zone of the Oromia Region, this town has a longitude and latitude of 8°40′N 39°26′E and an elevation of 1436 meters above sea level. It is the administrative center of Boset woreda.

== Demographics ==
Based on figures from the Central Statistical Agency in 2005, Welenchiti has an estimated total population of 20,984 of whom 10,545 were males and 10,439 were females. The 1994 national census reported this town had a total population of 11,732 of whom 5,719 were males and 6,013 were females.

== Resources ==
Welenchiti is known for agricultural products mainly growing Teff which will be produced in large quantities supplying the region reaching Dire Dawa and Harar in the route to Djibouti.

== Transport ==
Welenchiti is served by a railway station on the Addis Ababa–Djibouti Railway. The town also holds a Saturday livestock market.

== Religion ==
Welenchiti is home of Ethiopian Orthodox believers and Muslim believers however believers of other religions like Protestants and others also exist. The people in the city are leaving in harmony and friendship for a long without having ethnic differences.
