= Adami Tullu =

Adami Tullu Adaamii Tulluu (Oromo)
- Town
- Location within Ethiopia
- Coordinates: 7°52′N 38°42′E
- Country: Ethiopia
- Region: Oromia
- Zone: East Shewa Zone
- Woreda: Adami Tullu and Jido Kombolcha
- Elevation: 1,636 m (5,367 ft)

Population (2005)
  - Total: 9,034
- Time zone: UTC+3 (EAT)
- Climate: Cwb

Adami Tullu (Oromo, Tulluu Adaamii also spelled Adaamii Tuluu) is a town located about 168 kilometers south of Addis Ababa in the East Shewa Zone of the Oromia Region, Ethiopia. Adami Tullu has a latitude and longitude of 7°52′N 38°42′E with an elevation of 1636 meters above sea level. It is one of five towns in Adami Tullu and Jido Kombolcha woreda.

Adami Tulli was founded by an emigrant from Germany named Goetz around 1902. He built a substantial farmhouse on the top of a local hill, which the Guida described in 1938 as "picturesque like a medieval castle". During the Second Italian-Abyssinian War, the local Arsi Oromo looted and burned his farm, forcing Goetz to flee to an island in Lake Zway for safety. He returned for a while, but when his property was ruined a second time in the chaos following the defeat of the Italian occupiers, Goetz returned to the island in Lake Zway for good, where David Buxton found him in 1943. The house Goetz lived in during 1960 is still existing near the church (Foto from 2015: /Users/Wolfgang/Pictures/Bibliothek iPhoto/Masters/2015/03/07/20150307-120138/IMGP2481.JPG). The ruins of Goetz's former "castle" can still be seen in 2015 on top of the hill (/Users/Wolfgang/Pictures/Bibliothek iPhoto/Previews/2015/02/28/20150228-162417/IMG_1041.jpg).

== Demographics ==
Based on figures from the Central Statistical Agency in 2005, Adami Tulli has an estimated total population of 9,034 of whom 4,565 were males and were 4,469 females. The 1994 census reported this town had a total population of 5,050 of whom 2,476 were males and 2,574 were females.
