= Meki =

Town located in Oromia state of Ethiopia

Meki: መቂ (Amharic); Maqii (Oromo)
- Town
- Location within Ethiopia
- Coordinates: 08°9′N 38°49′E
- Country: Ethiopia
- Region: Oromia
- Zone: East Shewa Zone
- Woreda: Dugda
- Elevation: 1,636 m (5,367 ft)

Population (2005)
  - Total: 36,597
- Time zone: UTC+3 (EAT)

Meki (Amharic: መቂ; Oromo: Maqii) is a town in east-central Ethiopia. Located in the East Shewa Zone of the Oromia Region, it has a latitude and longitude of 8°9′N 38°49′E with an elevation of 1636 meters above sea level. Meki is the administrative center of Dugda woreda.

== History ==
Visitors in early 1927 found that there was a kind of bridge over the Meki River near the town which could be crossed by a motorcar. The bridge was the creation of a foreign farmer, who had modified a large tree trunk which had grown more or less across the river.

News sources reported in March 1974 that, as part of the Derg, peasants near Meki rose up against local landlords, settling old grievances. At least 15 persons were reportedly killed: about ten victims had been hacked to death with knives and spears, and the bodies of three people were found in wells. The police regained control after killing a dozen peasants and arresting hundreds.

== Demographics ==
Based on figures from the Central Statistical Agency in 2005, Meki has an estimated total population of 36,597 of whom 18,422 are men and 18,175 are women. The 1994 national census reported this town had a total population of 20,460 of whom 9,991 were males and 10,469 were females.

== Catholic Church services ==
The Apostolic Vicariate of Meki of the Catholic Church has its headquarters in Meki, which also runs a local high school in the town, Meki Catholic School (MCS), and the Community of Saint Paul, a Catholic association, has a presence there. The Kidist Mariam Pastoral Centre provides training courses for vulnerable women including food preparation, tailoring and hairdressing; as of May 2023, the centre had 380 students.
