= Wenji Gefersa =

Town located in Oromia state of Ethiopia

Wenji Gefersa Wanjii Gafarsaa (Oromo)
- Location within Ethiopia
- Coordinates: 8°27′N 39°13′E
- Country: Ethiopia
- Region: (Oromia Region) Oromia
- Zone: East Shewa Zone
- Elevation: 1,466 m (4,810 ft)
- Time zone: UTC+3 (EAT)

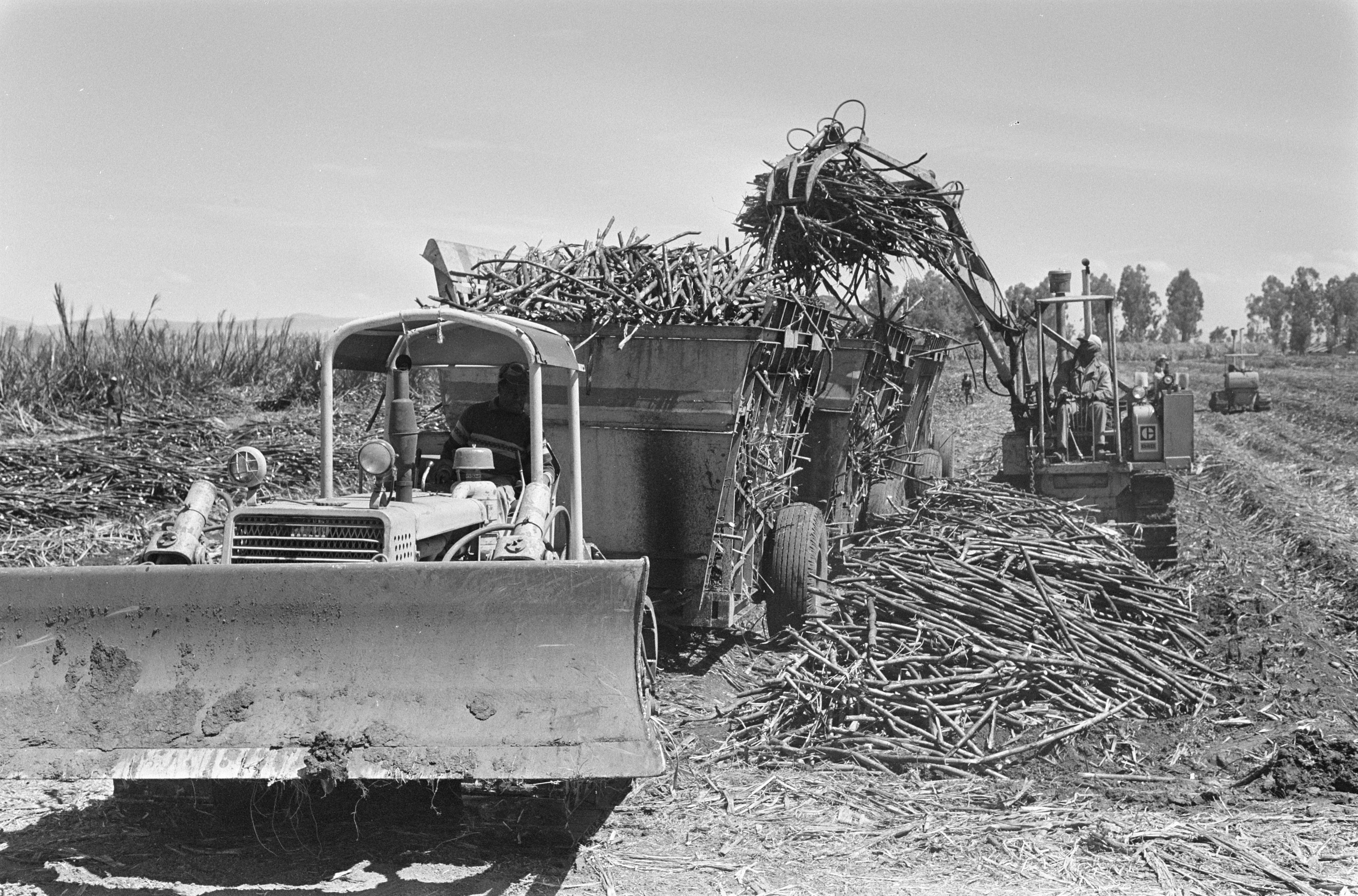
Sugar plantation in Wenji Gefersa (1969)

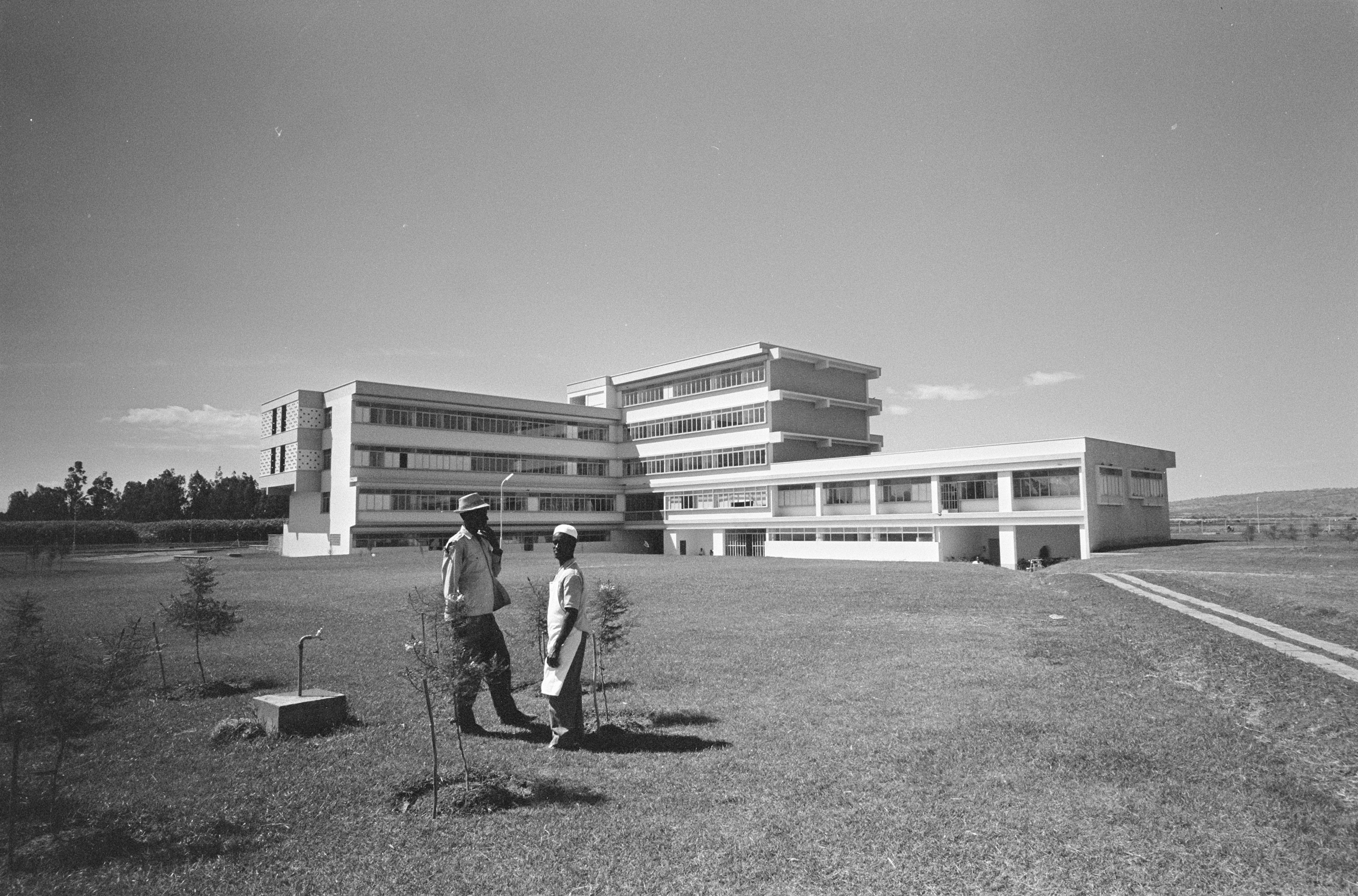
Hospital (1969))

Wenji Gefersa (Oromo: Wancii Gafarsaa) a town in central Ethiopia. Located in the East Shewa Zone of the Oromia, it has a latitude and longitude of 8°27′N 39°17′E with an elevation of 1588 meters above sea level.

== Overview ==
Local landmarks include the Wenji Ye'itkilt Wana Mesreya church and the Wonji Sugar Plantation, which covers about 7050 hectares of land. A paper mill was opened in Wenji Gefersa in 1970.

In the latter part of August 1968, approximately 2,000-4,000 workers from the plantation marched to Addis Ababa in a labor protest; they were met by military fire and several workers were killed.

== Demographics ==
Based on figures from the Central Statistical Agency in 2005, Wenji Gefersa has an estimated total population of 23,510 of whom 11,456 were males and 12,054 were females. The 1994 national census reported this town had a total population of 13,156 of whom 6,213 were males and 6,943 were females. This was a dramatic decrease from the 38,408 recorded in 1987. It is one of five settlements in Nannawa Adama.
