= Wegagen Bank =

Private bank in Ethiopia

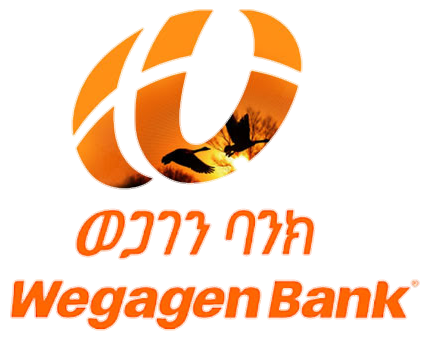

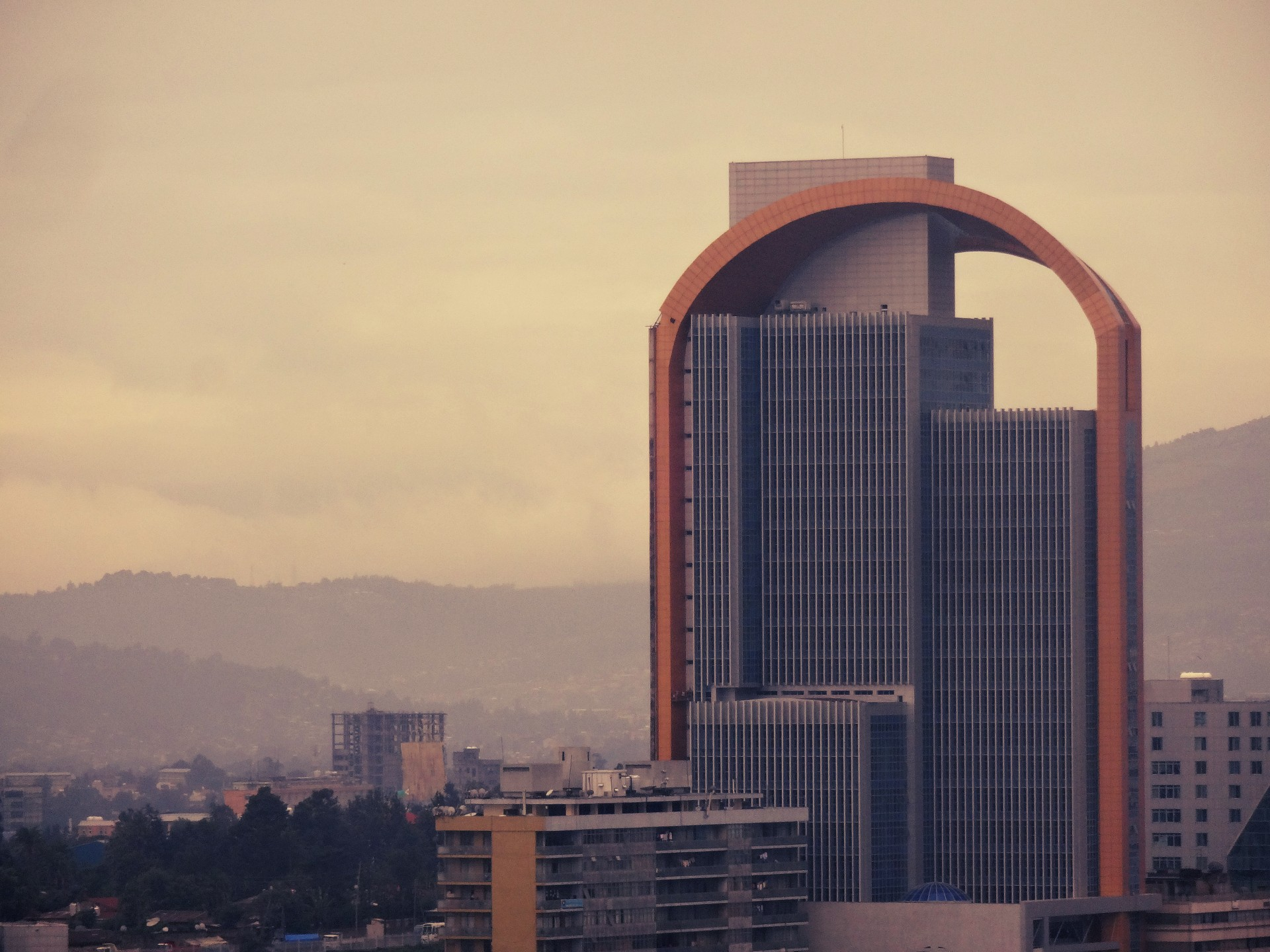
- Wegagen Bank headquarter in hub of Addis Ababa
- Company type: Joint stock
- Industry: Financial services
- Founded: 11 June 1997; 29 years ago
- Headquarters: Wegagen Bank Headquarters, Addis Ababa
- Key people: Tsegaye Lemma; Teferi Zewdu Manahiloh; Tefera Molla Habtyes
- Products: Banking
- Revenue: ETB 394 Million (2014)
- Website: www.wegagenbanksc.com

Wegagen Bank SC (Amharic: ወጋገን ባንክ) is a private joint stock bank in Ethiopia that was incorporated in 1997. The bank provides retail banking services to individuals and businesses in Ethiopia.

As of 2016, according to its website, the capital of the bank reached 1.8 billion Birr. Its deposits in 2013–14 exceeded 16 billion birr. Wegagen Bank is a medium-sized bank with a network of 397 branches of which 144 are in Addis Ababa and the remaining 253 are located in other cities and towns of the country. To expand its service coverage, the bank keeps on opening additional branches both in Addis Ababa and regional towns.

== History ==
The bank was established on the 11 June 1997 as a result of the entrepreneurial wit of sixteen founding members who recognized the critical role that financial institutions would play towards creating a sustained economic development. They were able to put in an initial paid-in capital of thirty million Birr.

Established under the banking proclamation of Licensing and Supervision, Proclamation No. 84/1994, the bank was registered with the National Bank of Ethiopia on 30 April 1997. The Memorandum and Articles of Association of the bank were signed on 15 April 1997 and registered with the Addis Ababa Bureau of Trade, Industry and Tourism on 15 April 1997, Registration Number 1/34/4/89.

When it started the bank operated through its head office located in Gofa Sefer, Addis Ababa. In October 2017, Wegagen moved to its 23 Storey Headquarters Building in front of Addis Ababa Stadium, Ras Mekonnen Street.

In July 2000, Wegagen Bank was a pioneer in Ethiopia by introduce a core banking system, thereby managing to network the head office and all branches. Through its core banking system, the bank was able to delivering more efficient services to its customers. The system also enabled the bank to provide technology-based banking services such as card payment services through ATM & EFTPOS, internet banking as well as mobile banking services.

Its headquarters are a modern building located at the central financial hub of Addis Ababa. It is one of eight banks in Ethiopia that has launched an agent banking system.

== See also ==
- List of banks in Ethiopia
