= Mount Fentale =

Stratovolcano in Ethiopia

Fentale
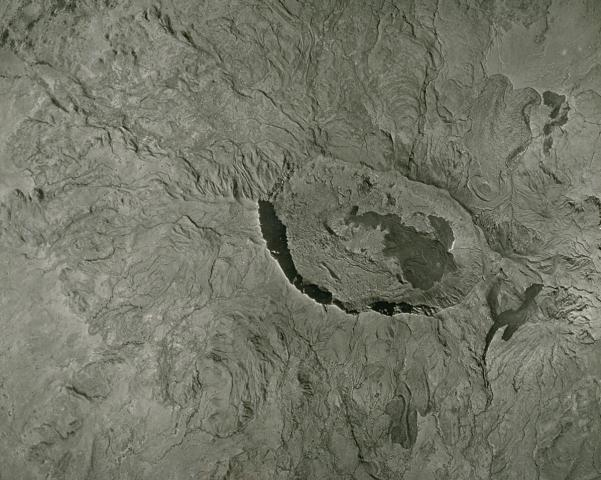
- A vertical aerial photo of the Fentale volcanic complex

Highest point
- Elevation: 2,007 m (6,585 ft)
- Listing: Volcanoes of Ethiopia
- Coordinates: 8°58′30″N 39°55′48″E

Geography
- Location within Ethiopia
- Location: Afar Region, Ethiopia

Geology
- Mountain type: Stratovolcano
- Last eruption: 1820 (?)

Fentale is a stratovolcano located in Awash National Park which was found in the Afar Region, Ethiopia. It is the highest point of Fentale woreda.

== History ==
Philip Briggs describes Mount Fentale as being crowned by a 350-metre-deep (1,150 ft) crater. Briggs concludes that this volcano "is responsible for the bleak hundred-year-old lava flows that cross the road immediately west of Metehara, and its steam vents can sometimes be seen displaying from the surrounding plains at night."

The date of these eruptions is fixed by the investigations of the early 19th-century explorer William Cornwallis Harris, whom David Buxton states first encountered this volcano and its lava beds in 1842. By questioning the natives, Harris concluded that the most recent eruptions had taken place 30 years before his arrival.

Throughout late 2024 and early 2025, some seismic activity occurred near Fentale as the volcano's activity increased.

== See also ==
- List of stratovolcanoes
