= Meki River =

River in central Oromia, Ethiophia

Location
- Country: Ethiopia
- Regions: CERS, Oromia

Physical characteristics
- Source: Ethiopian Highlands
  - location: Deldo Forest
  - coordinates: 8°13′41″N 38°18′56″E
  - elevation: 3,345 m (10,974 ft)
- Mouth: Lake Ziway
  - location: South of Meki
  - coordinates: 8°4′8″N 38°52′53″E
  - elevation: 1,635 m (5,364 ft)
- Length: 127 km (79 mi)
- Basin size: 2,490 km^{2} (960 sq mi)
- Discharge
  - location: Mouth
  - average: 28.3 m^{3}/s (1,000 cu ft/s)
  - minimum: 6.17 m^{3}/s (218 cu ft/s)
  - maximum: 99.1 m^{3}/s (3,500 cu ft/s)

Basin features
- River system: Meki Basin
- Cities: Meki
- Population: 1,220,000
- Tributaries
  - right: Weja

The Meki is a river in central Oromia, Ethiopia. It empties into Hora-Dambal.

O.G.S. Crawford identifies the Meki with a river on a map which was drawn in 1662 (there named "Machy") to illustrate Manuel de Almeida's history of Ethiopia. Crawford explains that the cartographer learned of this stream from the Jesuit missionaries residing in Ethiopia at the time of Emperor Susenyos.

== See also ==
- List of rivers of Ethiopia
