= Lake Ziway =

One of the Rift Valley lakes of Ethiopia

Hora-Dambal
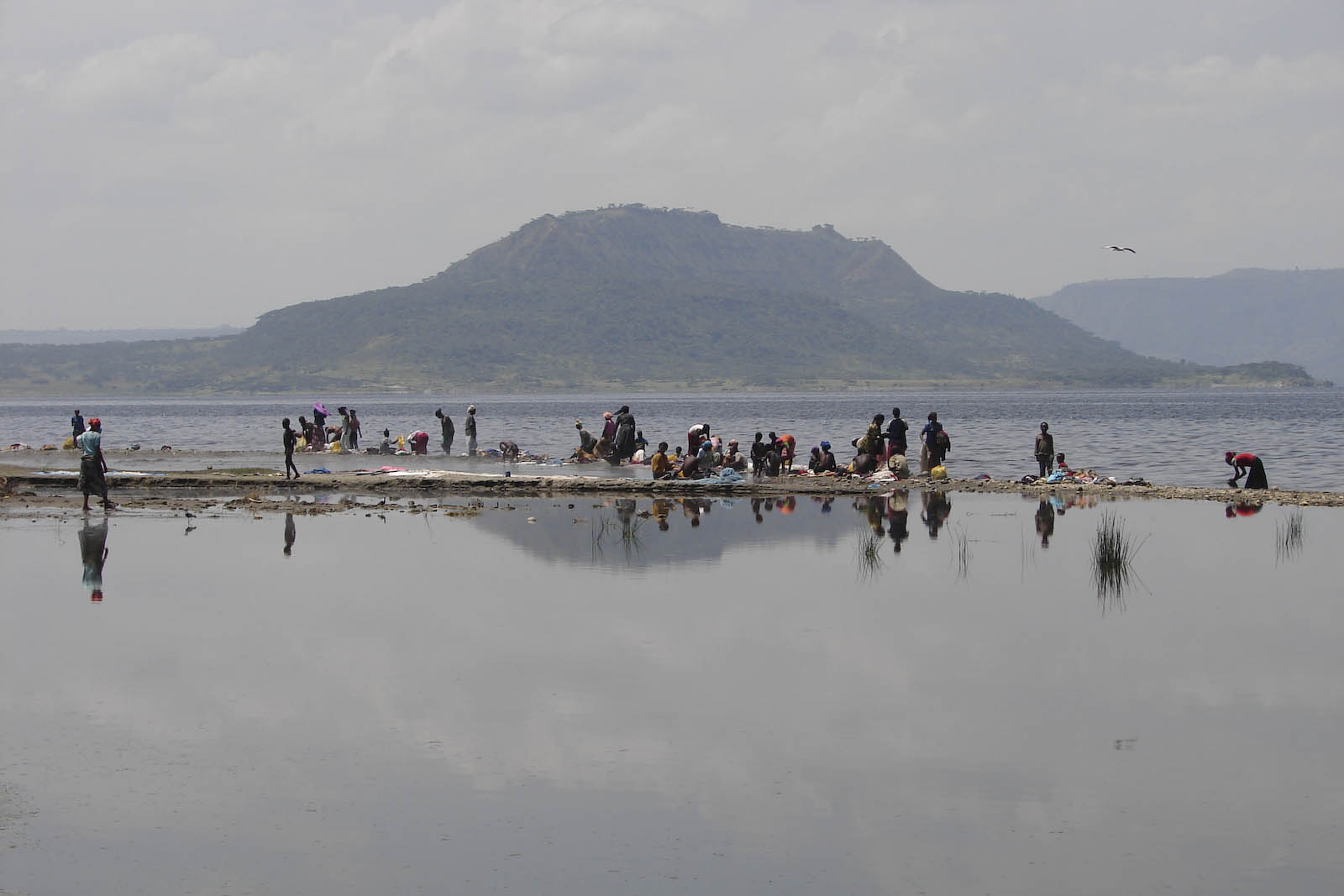

- Location within Ethiopia

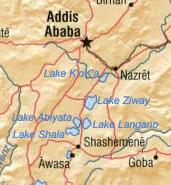
- Coordinates: 08.00°N 38.83°E
- Basin countries: Ethiopia
- Max. length: 31 km (19 mi)
- Max. width: 20 km (12 mi)
- Surface area: 440 km^{2} (170 sq mi)
- Max. depth: 8.9 m (29 ft)
- Surface elevation: 1,636 m (5,367 ft)
- Settlements: Batu

Lake Batu, also known as Hora-Dambal or Dambal (Oromo: Hora Dambal) is one of the freshwater Rift Valley lakes of Ethiopia. Located about 100 miles south of Addis Ababa, on the border between the Oromia and Southern Nations, Nationalities, and Peoples' Region, the woredas holding the lake's shoreline are Adami Tullu-Jido Kombolcha, Dugda, and Batu town. The town of Batu lies on the lake's western shore. The lake is fed primarily by two rivers, the Meki from the west and the Katar from the east, and is drained by the Bulbula which empties into Lake Abijatta. The lake's catchment has an area of 7,025 square kilometers.

Hora-Dambal is 31 kilometers long and 20 km wide, with a surface area of 440 square kilometers. It has a maximum depth of 9 meters and lies at an elevation of 1,636 meters. It has a maximum depth of 4 meters and is at an elevation of 1,846 meters. It contains five islands, including Debre Sina, Galila, Funduro, Tsedecha and Tulu Gudo, which is home to a monastery said to have housed the Ark of the Covenant around the ninth century.

The shores and islands of Hora Dambal are the home of the Zay people. Tradition states that when Ahmad ibn Ibrahim al-Ghazi of the Adal Sultanate conquered Ethiopia, the Christians of the area took refuge on its islands. They were later isolated from the rest of Ethiopia by the Oromo people, who lived around the lake. At the time Menelik II conquered the lands around the lake, the lake-dwellers were rediscovered and found to have preserved both their Christian faith and a number of ancient manuscripts.

The early 20th-century explorer Herbert Weld Blundell describes finding "two distinct terraces of former shores rise some 80 feet above the present level, forming a ring round that nearest to the lake on the north, about 4 miles from the shore, marking a former basin." The northern shores were covered by papyrus. Weld Blundell includes in his account of "a curious tradition, perhaps suggested by the apparent elevated shore," and that the lake "was a kingdom 50 miles across, inhabited by seventy-eight chiefs", which disappeared in a single night.

The lake is known for its large population of birds and hippopotamuses. It also supports a fishing industry; according to the Ethiopian Department of Fisheries and Aquaculture, 2454 tonnes of fish are landed each year, which the department estimates is 83% of its sustainable amount.
