= Batu (town) =

Town in Oromia Region, Ethiopia

Ziway Baatuu (Oromo) ዚዋይ
- Town
- Location within Ethiopia
- Coordinates: 7°56′N 38°43′E
- Country: Ethiopia
- Region: Oromia
- Zone: East Shewa
- Elevation: 1,643 m (5,390 ft)

Population (2007)
  - Total: 43,660
- Time zone: UTC+3 (EAT)
- Area code: +251 46 441
- Climate: Cwb

Batu, formally known by its exonym Zway or Ziway, is a town and woreda on the road connecting Addis Ababa to Nairobi in the East Shewa Zone of Ethiopia. Zeway has a latitude and longitude of 7°56′N 38°43′E with an elevation of 1,643 meters above sea level.

== Economy ==
Located on the shore of Hora Dambal, the economy of the town is based on fishing and horticulture. Batu is also home to a prison and a caustic soda factory. The Dutch company Sher operates what in 2019 was called "the world's largest rose farm, employing 1,500 workers."

== Demographics ==
The 2007 national census recorded Batu's total population at 43,660, of whom 22,956 were men and 20,704 women. The majority of the inhabitants said they practised Ethiopian Orthodox Christianity, with 51.04% of the population reporting they observed this belief, while 24.69% of the population were Muslim, 0.42% practiced traditional beliefs, and 22.07% of the population were Protestant. The 1994 national census reported this town had a total population of 20,056 of whom 10,323 were males and 9,733 were females. Ethnic groups in Batu are Oromo Arsi and Habaryonis Dandan Arreh aka Habarnoosa

== Climate ==
Climate data for Batu, elevation 1,640 m (5,380 ft), (1961–1990)
Month	Jan	Feb	Mar	Apr	May	Jun	Jul	Aug	Sep	Oct	Nov	Dec	Year
Mean daily maximum °C (°F)	25.3 (77.5)	27.1 (80.8)	27.7 (81.9)	28.2 (82.8)	27.7 (81.9)	27.2 (81.0)	25.1 (77.2)	24.6 (76.3)	25.1 (77.2)	25.7 (78.3)	25.2 (77.4)	25.3 (77.5)	26.2 (79.1)
Daily mean °C (°F)	18.7 (65.7)	19.7 (67.5)	20.2 (68.4)	20.2 (68.4)	19.7 (67.5)	20.1 (68.2)	19.5 (67.1)	19.1 (66.4)	19.0 (66.2)	19.1 (66.4)	18.7 (65.7)	17.6 (63.7)	19.3 (66.8)
Mean daily minimum °C (°F)	11.8 (53.2)	12.5 (54.5)	12.6 (54.7)	12.1 (53.8)	11.6 (52.9)	12.8 (55.0)	13.8 (56.8)	13.6 (56.5)	12.8 (55.0)	12.3 (54.1)	12.3 (54.1)	9.8 (49.6)	12.3 (54.2)
Average precipitation mm (inches)	11.0 (0.43)	65.0 (2.56)	59.0 (2.32)	88.0 (3.46)	67.0 (2.64)	79.0 (3.11)	145.0 (5.71)	124.0 (4.88)	89.0 (3.50)	37.0 (1.46)	4.0 (0.16)	7.0 (0.28)	775 (30.51)
Source: FAO
