= Addis Ababa National Stadium =

Stadium in Addis Ababa, Ethiopia

- Addis Ababa National Stadium
- Interactive map of Addis Ababa National Stadium
- Full name: Addis Ababa National Stadium
- Location: Djibouti Street, Bole, Addis Ababa, Ethiopia
- Coordinates: 9°0′10.3″N 38°47′28.4″E
- Owner: Government of Ethiopia
- Capacity: 62,000
- Surface: GrassMaster
- Field size: 105 × 68 m (115 x 74 yd)

Construction
- Groundbreaking: 5 January 2016
- Opened: 2027 (planned)
- Cost: $500M (estimated)
- Architect: MH Engineering PLC
- Main contractor: China Communications Construction Company

Tenant
- Ethiopia national football team

The Addis Ababa National Stadium (Amharic: አዲስ አበባ ብሄራዊ ስታዲያም), also known as Adey Ababa Stadium, will be a multi-purpose stadium, which can host football, rugby and athletics, in Bole, in eastern Addis Ababa, Ethiopia. It will be the national stadium of the Ethiopia national football team. The stadium will have a capacity of 62,000 and will be built by the China State Construction Engineering. While the stadium itself will cover 37 hectares, development is planned around it, spanning across 60 hectares.

The stadium includes CAF and FIFA preferences, enabling it to host international matches.

== See also ==
- List of stadiums in Ethiopia
- Lists of stadiums
