= Lake Basaka =

Lake in Oromia Region, Ethiopia

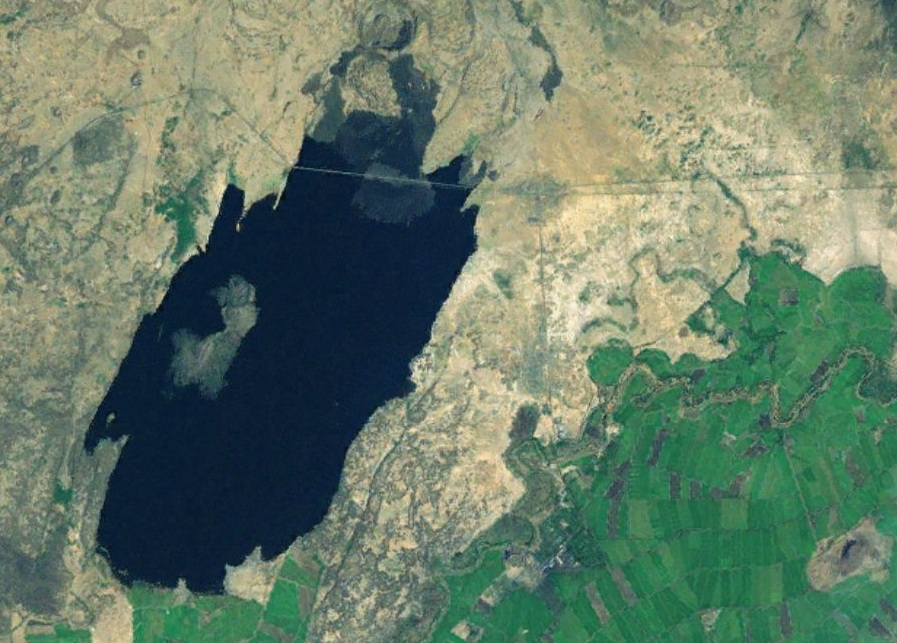

- Location within Ethiopia
- Coordinates: 8°52′N 39°52′E
- Basin countries: Ethiopia
- Surface area: 42.6 km^{2} (16.4 sq mi)
- Average depth: 8 m (26 ft)
- Surface elevation: 950 m (3,120 ft)
- Islands: 1
- Settlements: Metehara

Lake Basaka (Oromo: Hora Basakaa; Amharic: በሰቃ ሐይቅ) is a shallow, saline lake in the Oromia Region of central Ethiopia. It is located in the Great Rift Valley about 200 kilometres (120 mi) south east of the capital Addis Ababa. The lake is at an elevation of 950 metres (3,000 ft).

== Growth ==
The salt lake has grown significantly in the past 50 years, growing from 3 square kilometres (740 acres) in 1957 to 42.6 square kilometres (10,500 acres) in 2008. The lake is growing to the east and northeast due to the local topography.

== Impact ==
=== Agriculture ===
Due to the growth of the lake, there is an increasing concern that it will permanently damage the nearby Awash River, which is a major water source for nearby cotton and sugar plantations. These crops have significant economic importance to the region and the whole of Ethiopia. The salinity of the lake is 10.7 dS/m. The water salinity is also affecting the area groundwater as the salinity levels have increased in most plantation sections, and local sugar refineries have reduced production rates due to the loss of growing area.

=== Population ===
In 2011, a school succumbed to the growing level of the lake. Highway number 4, the main route between Addis Ababa and Djibouti has a permanent detour that has been constructed since the old highway is submerged. Homes have also been lost due to the expansion. It has been predicted that in 20–30 years, the town of Metehara will be displaced along with 21,000 citizens.

== See also ==
- Rift Valley lakes
