= Karrayyu =

Oromo clan in the East Shewa Zone, Ethiopia

The Karrayyu are an Oromo clan inhabiting the Awash Valley banks of Abadir and Merti area in central Ethiopia. They are pastoralists. Karrayyu neighbor the Afar and Argobba people. It is believed the extinct Harla ethnicity were assimilated into Karrayyu Oromo in eastern Shewa.

== History ==
The Karrayu appear in the historical records of Emperor Iyasu I as posing a threat to Argobba communities situated in Shewa during the latter portion of the seventeenth century.

== Genealogical traditions ==
According to Asma Giyorgis the Karrayu genealogy is the following:

Bartumā had six sons. Karrayu is the firstborn son; 2. Marawā; 3. Ittu; 4. Akkečču; 5. Waranțešā; 6. Humbanā. Karrayu begat six children who became many and strong tribes: 1. Liban, the strongest tribe of the Gāllā; 2. Wallo; 3. Ğellē; 4. Abbo; 5. Subā; 6. Balā'e. Wallo also begat six children: 1. Warra Bukko; 2. Warra Gur'ā; 3. Warra Nolē Illu; these three were named after Wallo. 4. Warra Karrayu; 5. Warra Illu; 6. Warra Noli'ali; these three were called Saddaččā

== See also ==
- List of Oromo subgroups and clans
