= East Shewa Zone =

Zone in Oromia Region of Ethiopia

Coordinates: 8°00′N 38°40′E

East Shewa Zone Shawaa Bahaa (Oromo)
- Zone
- Flag
- Interactive map of East Shewa Zone
- Country: Ethiopia
- Region: Oromia
- Capital: Adama

Map of the regions and zones of Ethiopia

East Shewa (Oromo: Shawaa Bahaa) is a zone in Oromia Region of Ethiopia. East Shewa is located at the center of Oromia, connecting the western regions to the eastern ones. This zone is bordered on the south by the West Arsi Zone, on the southwest by the Central Ethiopia Regional State, on the west by Southwest Shewa Zone and Oromia Special Zone Surrounding Finfinne, on the northwest by North Shewa, on the north by the Amhara Region, on the northeast by the Afar Region, and on the southeast by Arsi; its westernmost reach is defined by the course of the Bilate River. Towns and cities in East Shewa include Dukam, Galan, Tullu Dimt, Basaqa and Aqaqi, Bishoftu, Metehara, Batu Dambal and Adama. With the intent to rehabilitate degraded forests, the Zonal Agriculture and Rural Development Office announced 2 October 2, 2006, that it had planted over 36.3 million seedlings in 10 of the Zone's 12 woredas, covering 4,000 hectares of land.

== Demographics ==
Based on the 2007 Census conducted by the Central Statistical Agency of Ethiopia (CSA), this Zone has a total population of 1,356,342, of whom 696,350 are men and 659,992 women; with an area of 8,370.90 square kilometers, East Shewa has a population density of 162.03. While 340,225 or 25.08% are urban inhabitants, a further 664 or 0.05% are pastoralists. A total of 309,726 households were counted in this Zone, which results in an average of 4.38 persons to a household, and 296,342 housing units. The three largest ethnic groups reported were the Oromo (74.06%), the Amhara (15.39%) and Gurage (3.82%); all other ethnic groups made up 6.73% of the population. Oromo was spoken as a first language by 69.15%, Amharic was spoken by 24.29% and Gurage by 2.64% of the population; the remaining 3.92% spoke all other primary languages reported. The majority of the inhabitants professed Ethiopian Orthodox Christianity, with 69.33% of the population having reported they practiced that belief, while 16.18% of the population were Muslim, 8.4% of the population professed Protestantism and 5.08% practiced traditional beliefs.

Ethnic groups of East Shewa in 2007
1. Oromo (74.1%)
2. Amhara (15.4%)
3. Gurage (3.82%)
4. Other (6.73%)

The 1994 national census reported a total population for this Zone of 1,668,184 in 343,656 households, of whom 837,614 were men and 830,670 women; 444,376 or 26.64% of its population were urban dwellers at the time. The five largest ethnic groups reported in East Shewa were the Oromo (69.59%), the Amhara (16.77%), the Soddo Gurage (2.21%), the Kambaata (2%), and the Welayta (1.78%); all other ethnic groups made up 7.65% of the population. Oromo was spoken as a first language by 64.97%, 26.58% Amharic, 1.43% Soddo, and 1.28% spoke Hadiya; the remaining 5.74% spoke all other primary languages reported. The majority of the inhabitants professed Ethiopian Orthodox Christianity, with 58.76% of the population having reported they practiced that belief, while 35.01% of the population said they were Muslim, 3.47% were Protestant, and 1.57% held traditional beliefs.

According to a May 24, 2004 World Bank memorandum, 9% of the inhabitants of East Shewa have access to electricity, this zone has a road density of 54.7 kilometers per 1000 square kilometers (compared to the national average of 30 kilometers), the average rural household has 1.2 hectare of land (compared to the national average of 1.01 hectare of land and an average of 1.14 for the Oromia Region) and the equivalent of 1.0 heads of livestock. 14.5% of the population is in non-farm related jobs, compared to the national average of 25% and a Regional average of 24%. Concerning education, 61% of all eligible children are enrolled in primary school, and 19% in secondary schools. In a recent development, the Oromia Regional government announced 30 November 2007 that 110 new primary schools were put into operation in 10 woredas to improve the educational situation. Concerning health, 21% of the zone is exposed to malaria, and 49% to Tsetse fly. The memorandum gave this zone a drought risk rating of 372.
