= List of cities and towns in Ethiopia =

This is a list of cities and town in Ethiopia ordered by size and alphabetically.

== By population ==
The table below shows cities and towns with more than 40,000 inhabitants (from the projection for 2016 by using the 2007 census data). The population numbers are referring to the inhabitants of the cities themselves, suburbs and the metropolitan area outside the city area are not taken into account. Given the suburbs and the metropolitan area, the number of inhabitants might be much larger in several cases. Addis Ababa, for example, might have a total population of 4.5 to 5 million if also taking the metropolitan area into account.

Some towns which should be beyond a number of 40,000 inhabitants (like Holeta) are not shown as the last census happened in 2007. At that time, the area of some towns was different which makes it hard to provide numbers. Also, the last census happened in 2007, which results in major uncertainties. The next major census to account for these issues is foreseen to happen in February 2018.

Order	Name	Census 1984	Census 1994	Census 2007	Census 2016	Region	Zone/Woreda
1.	Addis Ababa	1,412,575	2,112,737	2,739,551	3,352,000	Addis Ababa Chartered City	Addis Ababa Chartered City
2.	Dire Dawa	61,583	112,249	233,224	341,991	Dire Dawa Chartered City	Dire Dawa Chartered City
3.	Mekelle	35,332	120,249	215,914	340,859	Tigray	Mekelle Special Zone
4.	Adama	76,284	127,842	220,212	338,940	Oromia	East Shewa Zone
5.	Bishoftu	71,143	123,372	215,928	329,847	Oromia	Bishoftu Metropolitan Area
6.	Hawassa	36,169	69,169	157,139	318,618	Sidama	Sidama Region
7.	Bahir Dar	54,800	96,140	155,428	297,794	Amhara	Bahir Dar Special Zone
8.	Gonder	98,104	164,851	207,044	285,000	Amhara	North Gonder Zone
9.	Dessie	68,848	97,314	120,095	198,428	Amhara	Debub Wollo Zone
10.	Jimma	60,992	88,867	120,960	186,148	Oromia	Jimma Special Zone
11.	Jijiga	23,183	56,821	125,876	164,321	Somali	Fafan Zone
12.	Shashamane	31,531	52,080	100,454	154,587	Oromia	West Arsi Zone
13.	Sodo	24,592	36,287	76,050	153,322	SNNPR	Wolayita Zone
14.	Arba Minch	23,032	40,020	74,879	151,013	SNNPR	Gamo Gofa Zone
15.	Hosaena	15,167	31,701	69,995	141,352	SNNPR	Hadiya Zone
16.	Harar	62,160	76,378	99,368	133,000	Harar	East Hararghe Zone
17.	Dilla	23,936	33,734	59,150	119,276	SNNPR	Gedeo Zone
18.	Nekemte	28,824	47,258	75,219	115,741	Oromia	East Welega
19.	Debre Birhan	25,753	38,717	65,231	107,827	Amhara	Semien Shewa Zone
20.	Asella	36,720	47,391	67,269	103,522	Oromia	Arsi Zone
21.	Debre Mark'os	39,808	49,297	62,497	103,263	Amhara	Misraq Gojjam
22.	Kombolcha	15,782	39,466	58,667	96,968	Amhara	Debub Wollo Zone
23.	Debre Tabor	...	22,455	55,596	91,968	Amhara	Debub Gondar
24.	Adigrat	16,262	37,417	57,588	90,658	Tigray	Misraqawi Zone
25.	Areka	...	12,294	31,408	80,693	SNNPR	Wolayita Zone/Boloso Sore
26.	Weldiya	15,690	24,533	46,139	76,331	Amhara	Semien Wollo Zone
27.	Sebeta	...	...	49,331	75,929	Oromia	Oromia Special Zone
28.	Burayu	...	...	48,876	75,232	Oromia	Oromia Special Zone
29.	Shire	12,846	25,269	47,284	74,503	Tigray	Semien Mi'irabawi Zone
30.	Ambo	17,325	27,636	48,171	74,120	Oromia	West Shewa Zone
31.	Arsi Negele	13,096	23,512	47,292	72,789	Oromia	West Arsi Zone/Arsi Negele
32.	Aksum	17,753	27,148	44,647	70,360	Tigray	Mehakelegnaw Zone
33.	Gambela	...	18,263	39,022	70,099	Gambela	Agnewak Zone
34.	Bale Robe	...	...	44,382	68,294	Oromia	Bale Zone
35.	Butajira	...	...	33,406	67,468	SNNPR	Gurage Zone
36.	Batu	...	...	43,660	67,162	Oromia	East Shewa Zone
37.	Boditi	...	...	24,133	61,985	SNNPR	Wolayita Zone/Damot Gale
38.	Adwa	13,823	24,519	40,500	63,759	Tigray	Mehakelegnaw Zone
39.	Yirgalem	16,003	24,183	30,348	60,260	Sidama	Sidama Zone/Dale
40.	Waliso	16,811	25,491	37,878	58,296	Oromia	Southwest Shewa Zone
41.	Welkite	...	...	28,866	58,223	SNNPR	Gurage Zone
42.	Gode	...	...	43,234	56,398	Somali	Gode Zone
43.	Meki	...	...	,36,252	55,772	Oromia	East Shewa Zone/Dugda
44.	Negele Borana	11,997	23,997	35,264	54,251	Oromia	Guji Zone
45.	Alaba Kulito	...	...	26,867	54,203	SNNPR	Alaba special woreda
46.	Alamata	14,030	26,179	33,214	52,435	Tigray	Debubawi Zone
47.	Chiro	...	...	33,670	51,782	Oromia	West Hararghe Zone
48.	Tepi	...	...	24,829	50,065	SNNPR	Sheka Zone/Yeki
49.	Durame	...	...	24,472	49,461	SNNPR	Kembata Tembaro Zone
50.	Goba	22,963	28,358	32,025	49,309	Oromia	Bale Zone
51.	Assosa	4,159	11,749	24,214	49,145	Benishangul-Gumuz	Assosa Zone
52.	Gimbi	...	...	30,981	47,674	Oromia	West Welega Zone
53.	Wukro	...	...	30,210	47,611	Tigray	Misraqawi Zone
54.	Haramaya	...	...	30,728	47,283	Oromia	East Hararghe Zone/Haro Maya
55.	Mizan Teferi	...	...	23,144	46,642	SNNPR	Bench Maji Zone/Mizan Aman
56.	Sawla	...	...	22,704	45,846	SNNPR	Gamo Gofa Zone
57.	Mojo	...	...	29,547	45,482	Oromia	East Shewa Zone/Dugda
58.	Dembi Dolo	...	...	29,448	45,309	Oromia	Kelem Welega Zone
59.	Aleta Wendo	...	...	22,093	44,544	SNNPR	Sidama Zone/Aleta Wondo
60.	Metu	...	...	28,782	44,296	Oromia	Illubabor Zone
61.	Mota	...	...	26,177	43,322	Amhara	Misraq Gojjam Zone/Hulet Ej Enese
62.	Fiche	...	...	27,493	42,334	Oromia	Semien Shewa Zone
63.	Finote Selam	...	...	25,913	42,882	Amhara	Mirab Gojjam Zone
64.	Bule Hora Town			27,820	42,801	Oromia	Borena Zone/Bule Hora
65.	Bonga	...	...	20,858	42,097	SNNPR	Keffa Zone
66.	Kobo	...	...	24,867	41,122	Amhara	Semien Wollo Zone/Kobo
67.	Jinka	...	...	20,267	41,071	SNNPR	South Omo Zone/Debub Ari
68.	Dangila	...	...	24,827	41,067	Amhara	Agew Awi Zone/Dangila
69.	Degehabur	...	28,708	30,027	39,182	Somali	Degehabur Zone
70.	Bedessa	...	...	27,654	41,072	South Ethiopia	Wolaita Zone/Damot Weyde
71.	Agaro	18,764	23,246	25,258	39,174	Oromia	Jimma Zone

== Cities and towns by population ==
=== 2025 population estimates ===
- 1.Addis Ababa 4,114,000
- 2.Mekelle 637,000
- 3.Dire Dawa 582,000
- 4.Adama 521,860
- 5.Bishoftu 519,374
- 6.Wolaita Sodo 512,498
- 7.Bahir Dar 498,735
- 8.Shashamane 452,945
- 9.Gondar 450,244
- 10.Hawassa 444,909
- 11.Jijiga 422,225
- 12.Dilla 360,925
- 13.Jimma 336,448
- 14.Dessie 306,979
- 15.Kombolcha 288,941
- 16.Harar 225,677
- 17.Asella 215,594
- 18.Arba Minch 201,049
- 19.Hosaena 200,000
- 20.Ambo 185,733
- 21.Debre Birhan 156,788
- 22.Nekemte 156,004
- 23.Debre Markos 149,441
- 24.Weldiya 148,020
- 25.Areka 130,386
- 26.Burayu 130,000
- 27.Shire 128,792
- 28.Adigrat 121,776
- 29.Sabata 120,000
- 30.Debre Tabor 119,176
- 31.Butajira 104,060
- 32.Bale Robe 101,600
- 33.Negele Arsi 98,114
- 34.Gambela 97,643
- 35.Axum 94,515

== Alphabetical ==
This listing does not have a threshold for the size of the towns and cities, but only includes places with an entry on this Wikipedia.

=== A ===
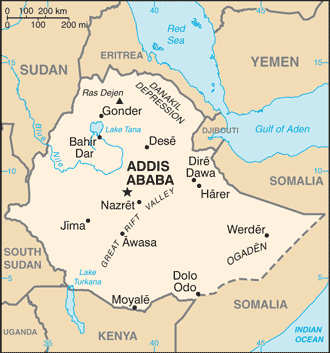
Map of Ethiopia

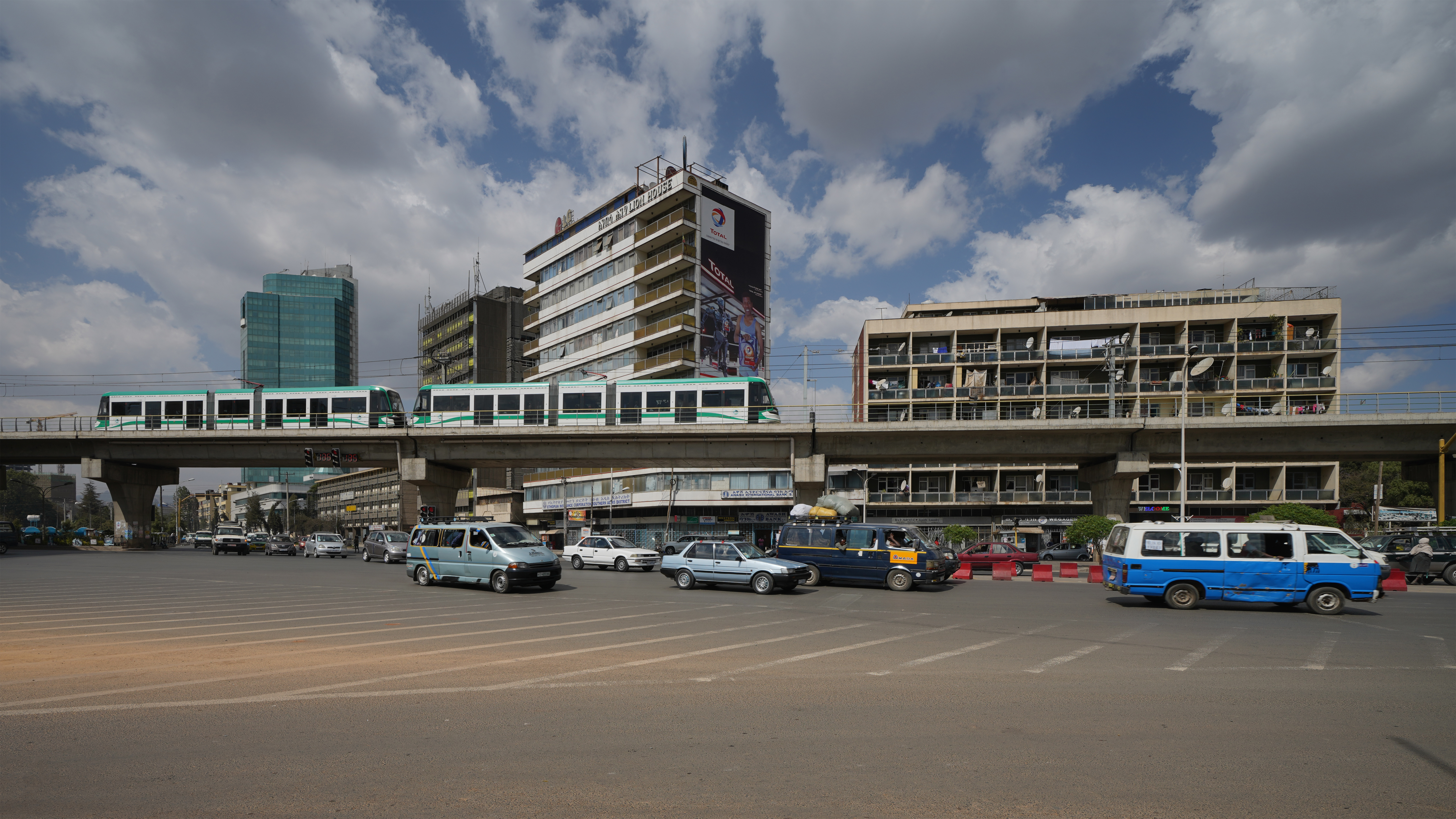
Addis Ababa, the capital of Ethiopia.

- Abiy Addi
- Abomsa
- Adama
- Adami Tulu
- Addis Ababa
- Addis Alem (Ejersa)
- Addis Zemen
- Adet
- Adi Daero
- Adi Gudom
- Adigrat
- Adola
- Adwa
- Afdem
- Agaro
- Agula
- Akaki
- Alaba (Kulito, Quliito)
- Alamata
- Aleltu
- Alem Ber
- Alem Ketema
- Alem Tena
- Aleta Wendo
- Alitena
- Amba Mariam
- Ambalage
- Ambo
- Amuru
- Angacha
- Ankober
- Arboye
- Areka
- Asaita
- Asella
- Assosa
- Aweday
- Aware
- Awasa
- Awash
- Awbare
- Aweday
- Axum
- Azezo

=== B ===
- Babille
- Badme
- Bahir Dar
- Bako
- Bambasi
- Bati
- Batu (Ziway)
- Bedele
- Bedessa
- Begi
- Beica
- Bekoji
- Bele
- Bichena
- Bike
- Bishoftu
- Bitena
- Boditi
- Bonga
- Bule Hora
- Burayu
- Butajira

=== C ===
- Chagni
- Chelenqo
- Chinaksen
- Chiro
- Chencha

=== D ===
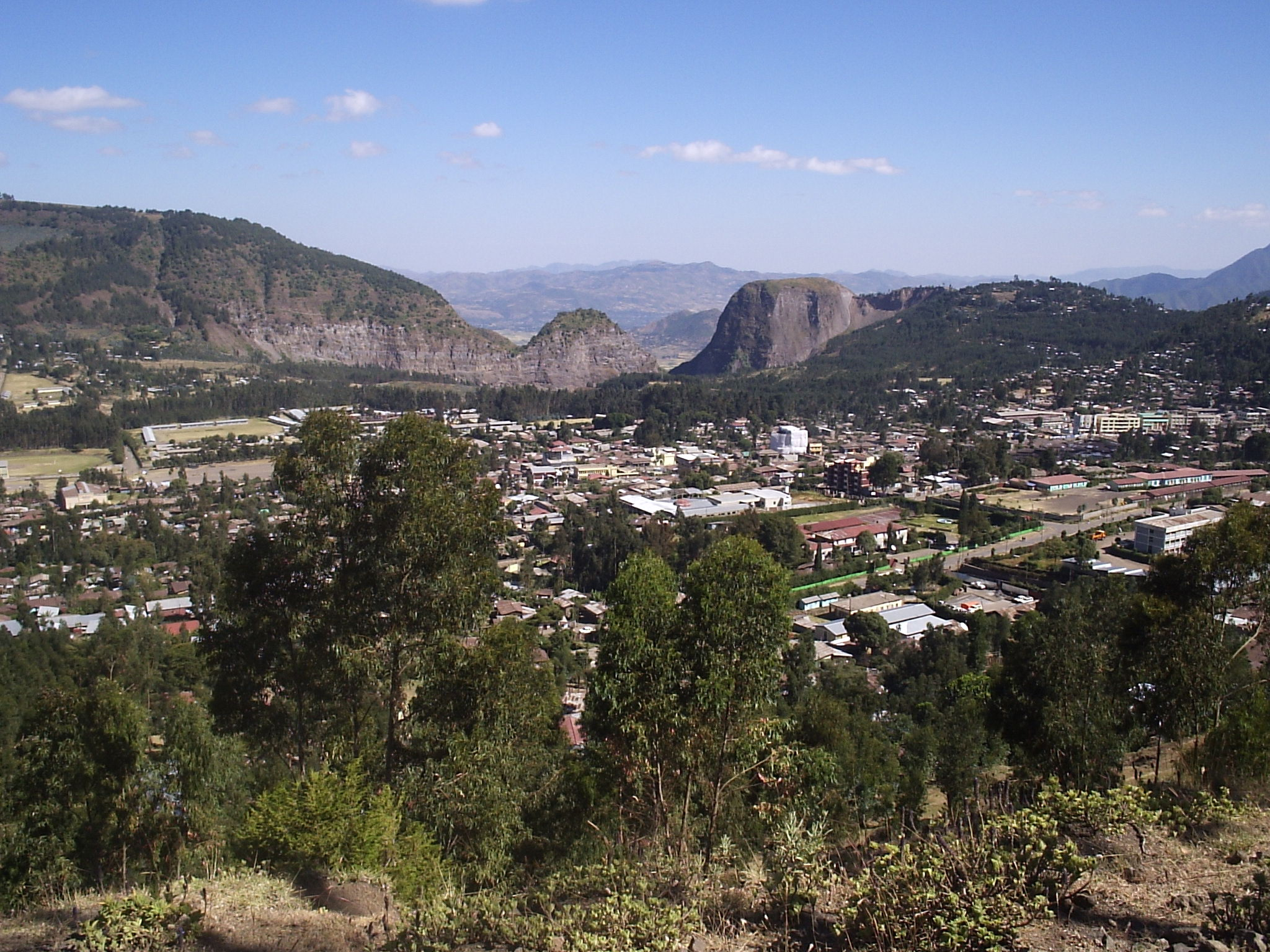
Dessie

- Dabat
- Daleti
- Danan
- Dangila
- Debarq
- Debre Berhan
- Debre Marqos
- Debre Selam (Chancho)
- Debre Sina
- Debre Tabor
- Debre Werq
- Debre Zebit
- Degehabur
- Dejen
- Dela
- Delgi
- Dembecha
- Dembidolo (Dembi Dolo)
- Dera
- Dessie (Dese)
- Dila
- Dimtu (Wolaita)
- Dinsho
- Dire Dawa
- Dodola
- Dolo Odo
- Durame
- Dalocha
- Dukem
- Durba

=== E ===
- Ejaji
- Ejersa Goro
- Elidar
- Emfraz (Imfraz, Guba'e)
- Enticho
- Erer

=== F ===
- Feres Bet
- Ferfer
- Filtu
- Finicha'a
- Fiche
- Finote Selam
- Freweyni
- Funyan Bira

=== G ===
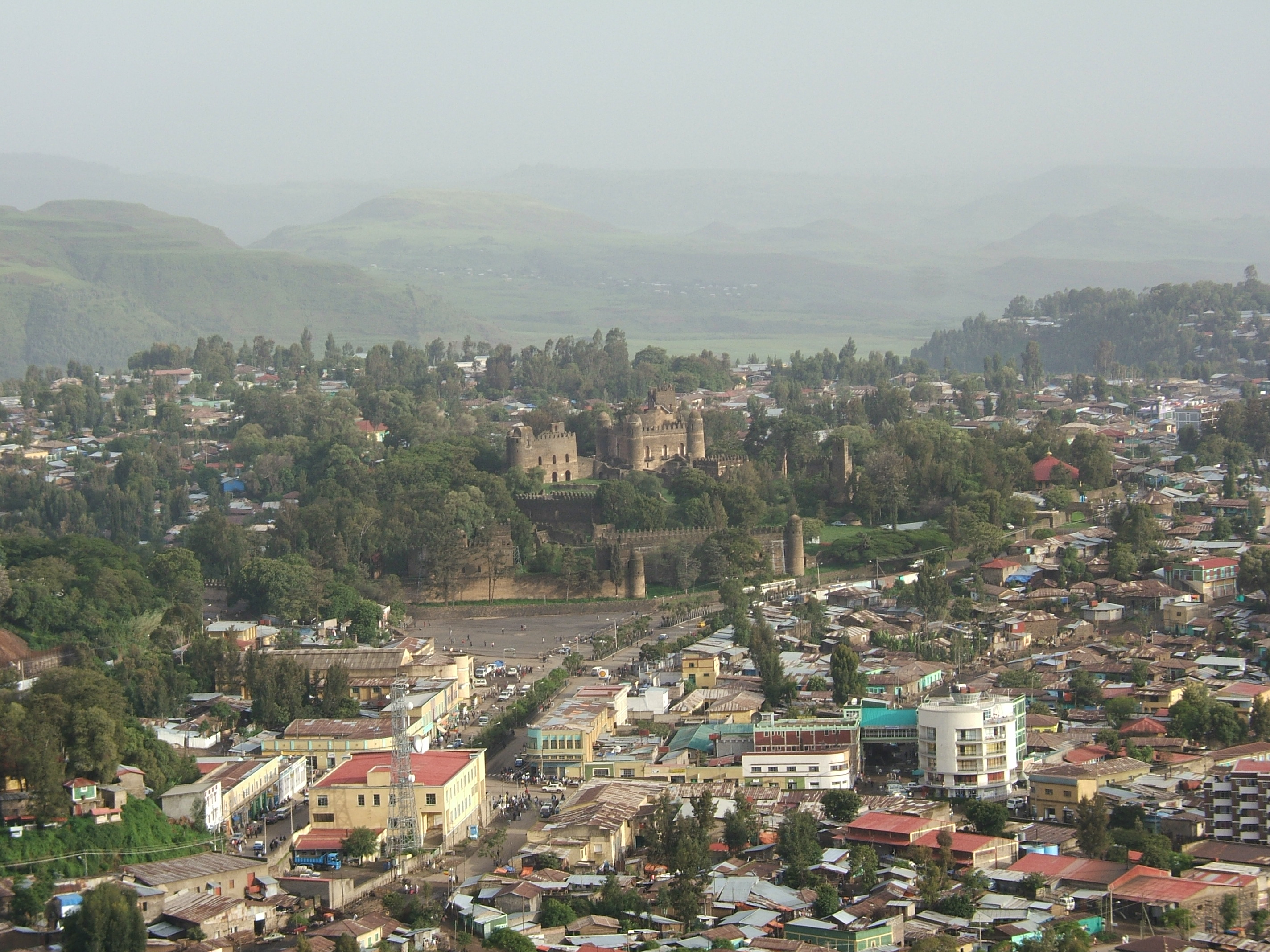
Gondar

- Gambela
- Gedeb
- Gesuba
- Geladin
- Gelemso
- Gerba
- Ghimbi
- Gidami
- Gidole
- Gijet
- Ginir
- Goba
- Gode
- Gololcha
- Gondar
- Gore
- Goro
- Gorgora
- Guder
- Guliso
- Gununo
- Gutin
- Gerbo

=== H ===
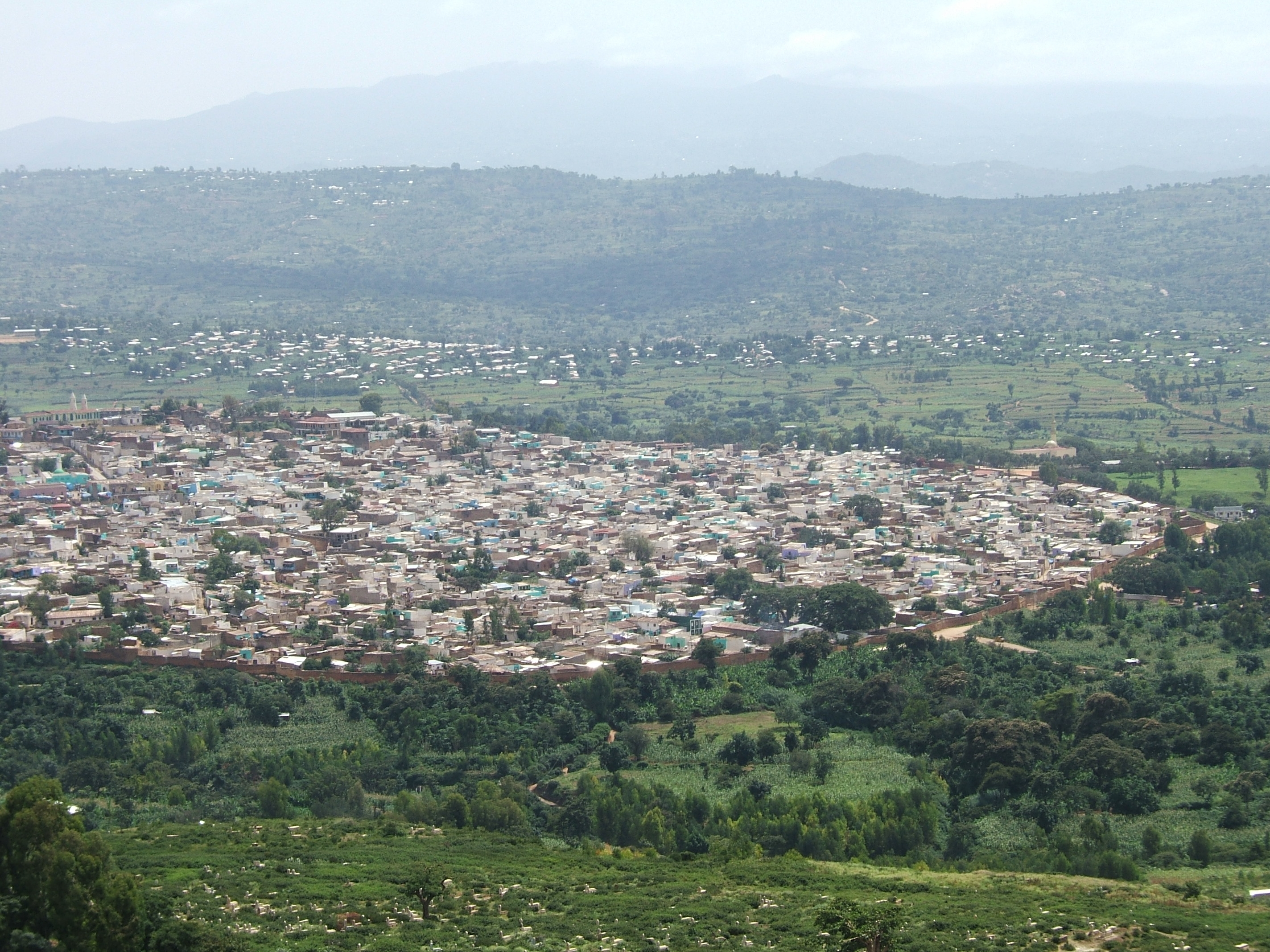
Harar

- Halaba Kulito
- Haramaya
- Harar
- Hawassa
- Hayq
- Heregel (Herogeel)
- Holeta
- Hosaena
- Humera
- Huruta
- Hurso

=== I ===
- Idaga Hamus (Saesi Tsaedaemba)
- Imi
- Inda Aba Guna (Indabaguna)
- Injibara
- Irgachefe
- Itang
- Iteya

=== J ===
- Jaldessa
- Jijiga
- Jimma
- Jinka

=== K ===
- Karat
- Kebri Beyah
- Kebri Dehar
- Kebri Mangest
- Kemise
- Kercheche
- Kobo
- Kombolcha
- Konso
- Korem
- Kula
- Kulubi
- Kurmuk

=== L ===
- Lalibela
- Lefe Isa
- Limmu Inariya

=== M ===
- Maimekden (May Mekdan)
- Majete
- Maji
- Manbuk
- Masha
- Maychew
- Mega
- Mek'ele
- Meki
- Mendi
- Menge
- Merawi
- Mersa
- Metehara
- Metemma
- Metu
- Mieso
- Mizan Teferi
- Milo
- Mojo
- Mota
- Moyale
- Mulu

=== N ===
- Negash
- Negele Arsi
- Negele Boran
- Nefas Mewcha
- Nejo
- Nekemte

=== O ===
- Ogolcho
- Omorate

=== R ===
- Raaso
- Rama
- Rema
- Robe, Bale

=== S ===
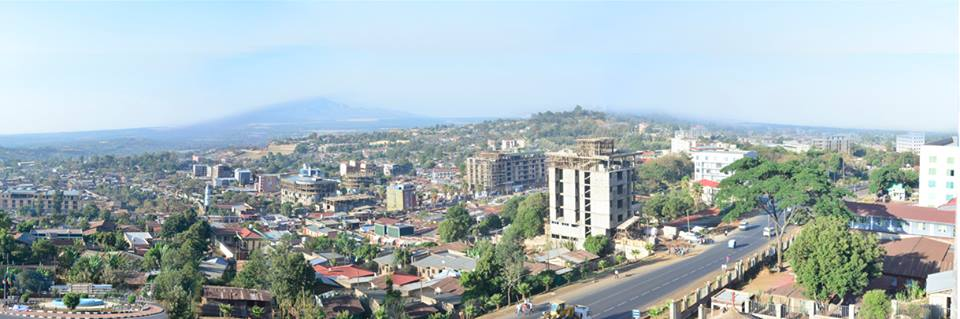
Center of Sodo Distance View

- Sabata
- Sawla (Gofa Sawla)
- Sagure
- Sebeta Hawas (Alem Gena)
- Sedika
- Seka
- Sekota
- Selekleka
- Semera
- Sendafa
- Shakiso
- Shambu
- Shashamane
- Sheder (Sheed-dheer, Shedher)
- Sheno
- Sheraro
- Shewa Robit (Shah Robit, Shoa Robit)
- Shilabo
- Shinshicho
- Shire
- Shone
- Sodo (Wolaita Sodo)
- Sodore
- Sululta

=== T ===
- Tebela
- Tenta
- Teppi
- Tiya
- Tullu Milki
- Tulu Bolo
- Turmi

=== W ===
- Wacca
- Wadera
- Waja
- Waliso
- Walwal
- Welenchiti
- Werder
- Were Ilu
- Wereta
- Woldia
- Wolleka
- Worabe
- Wuchale
- Wukro

=== Y ===
- Yabelo
- Yechila
- Yeha
- Yetmen
- Yirga Alem

== List of Region, Zone and Districts ==
Region	Zone	Districts
Sheger	Sheger	Sida Awash
Addis Ababa	Addis Ketema	Wereda 01
Addis Ababa	Addis Ketema	Wereda 03
Addis Ababa	Addis Ketema	Wereda 04
Addis Ababa	Addis Ketema	Wereda 05
Addis Ababa	Addis Ketema	Wereda 06
Addis Ababa	Addis Ketema	Wereda 08
Addis Ababa	Addis Ketema	Wereda 09
Addis Ababa	Addis Ketema	Wereda 10
Addis Ababa	Addis Ketema	Wereda 11
Addis Ababa	Addis Ketema	Wereda 12
Addis Ababa	Addis Ketema	Wereda 13
Addis Ababa	Addis Ketema	Wereda 14
Addis Ababa	Akaki Kaliti	Wereda 01
Addis Ababa	Akaki Kaliti	Wereda 02
Addis Ababa	Akaki Kaliti	Wereda 03
Addis Ababa	Akaki Kaliti	Wereda 04
Addis Ababa	Akaki Kaliti	Wereda 05
Addis Ababa	Akaki Kaliti	Wereda 06
Addis Ababa	Akaki Kaliti	Wereda 07
Addis Ababa	Akaki Kaliti	Wereda 08
Addis Ababa	Akaki Kaliti	Wereda 09
Addis Ababa	Akaki Kaliti	Wereda 10
Addis Ababa	Akaki Kaliti	Wereda 12
Addis Ababa	Akaki Kaliti	Wereda 13
Addis Ababa	Arada	Wereda 01
Addis Ababa	Arada	Wereda 02
Addis Ababa	Arada	Wereda 03
Addis Ababa	Arada	Wereda 04
Addis Ababa	Arada	Wereda 05
Addis Ababa	Arada	Wereda 06
Addis Ababa	Arada	Wereda 07
Addis Ababa	Arada	Wereda 08
Addis Ababa	Arada	Wereda 09
Addis Ababa	Arada	Wereda 10
Addis Ababa	Bole	Wereda 01
Addis Ababa	Bole	Wereda 02
Addis Ababa	Bole	Wereda 03
Addis Ababa	Bole	Wereda 04
Addis Ababa	Bole	Wereda 05
Addis Ababa	Bole	Wereda 06
Addis Ababa	Bole	Wereda 07
Addis Ababa	Bole	Wereda 09
Addis Ababa	Bole	Wereda 11
Addis Ababa	Bole	Wereda 12
Addis Ababa	Bole	Wereda 13
Addis Ababa	Bole	Wereda 14
Addis Ababa	Gulele	Wereda 01
Addis Ababa	Gulele	Wereda 02
Addis Ababa	Gulele	Wereda 03
Addis Ababa	Gulele	Wereda 04
Addis Ababa	Gulele	Wereda 05
Addis Ababa	Gulele	Wereda 06
Addis Ababa	Gulele	Wereda 07
Addis Ababa	Gulele	Wereda 08
Addis Ababa	Gulele	Wereda 09
Addis Ababa	Gulele	Wereda 10
Addis Ababa	Kerkos	Wereda 01
Addis Ababa	Kerkos	Wereda 02
Addis Ababa	Kerkos	Wereda 03
Addis Ababa	Kerkos	Wereda 04
Addis Ababa	Kerkos	Wereda 05
Addis Ababa	Kerkos	Wereda 07
Addis Ababa	Kerkos	Wereda 08
Addis Ababa	Kerkos	Wereda 09
Addis Ababa	Kerkos	Wereda 10
Addis Ababa	Kerkos	Wereda 11
Addis Ababa	Kolfe Keraniyo	Wereda 01
Addis Ababa	Kolfe Keraniyo	Wereda 02
Addis Ababa	Kolfe Keraniyo	Wereda 03
Addis Ababa	Kolfe Keraniyo	Wereda 04
Addis Ababa	Kolfe Keraniyo	Wereda 05
Addis Ababa	Kolfe Keraniyo	Wereda 06
Addis Ababa	Kolfe Keraniyo	Wereda 07
Addis Ababa	Kolfe Keraniyo	Wereda 08
Addis Ababa	Kolfe Keraniyo	Wereda 09
Addis Ababa	Kolfe Keraniyo	Wereda 10
Addis Ababa	Kolfe Keraniyo	Wereda 11
Addis Ababa	Lemi kura	Wereda 02
Addis Ababa	Lemi kura	Wereda 03
Addis Ababa	Lemi kura	Wereda 04
Addis Ababa	Lemi kura	Wereda 05
Addis Ababa	Lemi kura	Wereda 06
Addis Ababa	Lemi kura	Wereda 08
Addis Ababa	Lemi kura	Wereda 09
Addis Ababa	Lemi kura	Wereda 10
Addis Ababa	Lemi kura	Wereda 13
Addis Ababa	Lemi kura	Wereda 14
Addis Ababa	Lideta	Wereda 01
Addis Ababa	Lideta	Wereda 02
Addis Ababa	Lideta	Wereda 03
Addis Ababa	Lideta	Wereda 04
Addis Ababa	Lideta	Wereda 05
Addis Ababa	Lideta	Wereda 06
Addis Ababa	Lideta	Wereda 07
Addis Ababa	Lideta	Wereda 08
Addis Ababa	Lideta	Wereda 09
Addis Ababa	Lideta	Wereda 10
Addis Ababa	Nifas Slik Lafto	Wereda 01
Addis Ababa	Nifas Slik Lafto	Wereda 02
Addis Ababa	Nifas Slik Lafto	Wereda 05
Addis Ababa	Nifas Slik Lafto	Wereda 06
Addis Ababa	Nifas Slik Lafto	Wereda 07
Addis Ababa	Nifas Slik Lafto	Wereda 08
Addis Ababa	Nifas Slik Lafto	Wereda 09
Addis Ababa	Nifas Slik Lafto	Wereda 10
Addis Ababa	Nifas Slik Lafto	Wereda 11
Addis Ababa	Nifas Slik Lafto	Wereda 12
Addis Ababa	Nifas Slik Lafto	Wereda 13
Addis Ababa	Nifas Slik Lafto	Wereda 15
Addis Ababa	Yeka	Wereda 01
Addis Ababa	Yeka	Wereda 02
Addis Ababa	Yeka	Wereda 03
Addis Ababa	Yeka	Wereda 04
Addis Ababa	Yeka	Wereda 05
Addis Ababa	Yeka	Wereda 06
Addis Ababa	Yeka	Wereda 07
Addis Ababa	Yeka	Wereda 08
Addis Ababa	Yeka	Wereda 09
Addis Ababa	Yeka	Wereda 10
Addis Ababa	Yeka	Wereda 11
Addis Ababa	Yeka	Wereda 12
Afar	Zone_1(Awsiresu)	Adear
Afar	Zone_1(Awsiresu)	Afambo
Afar	Zone_1(Awsiresu)	Aysaita Ketema Astedader
Afar	Zone_1(Awsiresu)	Aysayita
Afar	Zone_1(Awsiresu)	Chifra
Afar	Zone_1(Awsiresu)	Dubti
Afar	Zone_1(Awsiresu)	Dubti Ketema Astedader
Afar	Zone_1(Awsiresu)	Elidar
Afar	Zone_1(Awsiresu)	Geyreni
Afar	Zone_1(Awsiresu)	Kori
Afar	Zone_1(Awsiresu)	Mile
Afar	Zone_2 (Kelbetiresu)	Abala Ketema Astedader
Afar	Zone_2 (Kelbetiresu)	Abeala
Afar	Zone_2 (Kelbetiresu)	Afdera
Afar	Zone_2 (Kelbetiresu)	Berehale
Afar	Zone_2 (Kelbetiresu)	Bidu
Afar	Zone_2 (Kelbetiresu)	Dalol
Afar	Zone_2 (Kelbetiresu)	Erebti
Afar	Zone_2 (Kelbetiresu)	Kuneba
Afar	Zone_2 (Kelbetiresu)	Megale
Afar	Zone_3 (Gebiresu)	Amibara
Afar	Zone_3 (Gebiresu)	Argoba Liyu
Afar	Zone_3 (Gebiresu)	Awash Fentale
Afar	Zone_3 (Gebiresu)	Awash Ketema Astedader
Afar	Zone_3 (Gebiresu)	Dulesa
Afar	Zone_3 (Gebiresu)	Gelalo
Afar	Zone_3 (Gebiresu)	Gewane
Afar	Zone_4 (Fentiresu)	Awra
Afar	Zone_4 (Fentiresu)	Ewa
Afar	Zone_4 (Fentiresu)	Golina
Afar	Zone_4 (Fentiresu)	Teru
Afar	Zone_4 (Fentiresu)	Yalo
Afar	Zone_5 (Hari Resu)	Dalifage
Afar	Zone_5 (Hari Resu)	Dewe
Afar	Zone_5 (Hari Resu)	Hadele'ela
Afar	Zone_5 (Hari Resu)	Semurobi
Afar	Zone_5 (Hari Resu)	Telalak
Afar	Zone_6	Logia Semera
Amhara	Awi	Ankesha Guagusa
Amhara	Awi	Ayehu Guagusa
Amhara	Awi	Banja Shigudad
Amhara	Awi	Chagini
Amhara	Awi	Dangila
Amhara	Awi	Dangla Ketema Astedader
Amhara	Awi	Enjibara Ketema Astedader
Amhara	Awi	Fagita Lekoma
Amhara	Awi	Guagusashekudad
Amhara	Awi	Guangua
Amhara	Awi	Jawi
Amhara	Awi	Zigem
Amhara	Bahir Dar Liyu	Bahir Dar Ketema Zuria
Amhara	Bahir Dar Liyu	Bahirdar Ketema /Geter/ and Tana
Amhara	Bahir Dar Liyu	Belay Zeleke
Amhara	Bahir Dar Liyu	Fasilo
Amhara	Bahir Dar Liyu	Ginbot 20
Amhara	Bahir Dar Liyu	Gishe Abay
Amhara	Bahir Dar Liyu	Hidar 11
Amhara	Debub Gonder	Addis Zemen
Amhara	Debub Gonder	Andabet
Amhara	Debub Gonder	Debre Tabor
Amhara	Debub Gonder	Dera
Amhara	Debub Gonder	Ebinat
Amhara	Debub Gonder	Estie
Amhara	Debub Gonder	Farta
Amhara	Debub Gonder	Fogera
Amhara	Debub Gonder	Guna Begie Midir
Amhara	Debub Gonder	Lay Gayint
Amhara	Debub Gonder	Libokemkem
Amhara	Debub Gonder	Mekane Eyesus
Amhara	Debub Gonder	Meketewa
Amhara	Debub Gonder	Nifas Mewcha
Amhara	Debub Gonder	Sedie Muja
Amhara	Debub Gonder	Simada
Amhara	Debub Gonder	Tachgayint
Amhara	Debub Gonder	Woreta
Amhara	Debub Wello	Albuko
Amhara	Debub Wello	Ambasel
Amhara	Debub Wello	Argoba Liyu
Amhara	Debub Wello	Borena
Amhara	Debub Wello	Delanta
Amhara	Debub Wello	Dessie Zuriya
Amhara	Debub Wello	Haik
Amhara	Debub Wello	Jama
Amhara	Debub Wello	Kalu
Amhara	Debub Wello	Kelala
Amhara	Debub Wello	Kombolcha Ketema Astedader
Amhara	Debub Wello	Kutaber
Amhara	Debub Wello	Legambo
Amhara	Debub Wello	Legehida
Amhara	Debub Wello	Mehal Sayint
Amhara	Debub Wello	Mekane Selam Ketema Astedader
Amhara	Debub Wello	Mekdela
Amhara	Debub Wello	Saynt Adjibar
Amhara	Debub Wello	Tehuledere
Amhara	Debub Wello	Teneta
Amhara	Debub Wello	Werebabo
Amhara	Debub Wello	Wereilu
Amhara	Debub Wello	Wereilu Ketema Astedader
Amhara	Debub Wello	Wogdie
Amhara	Dessie Town Administration	Arada
Amhara	Dessie Town Administration	Banbawuha
Amhara	Dessie Town Administration	Dessie Ketema /Geter/ and Menafesha
Amhara	Dessie Town Administration	Hote
Amhara	Dessie Town Administration	Segnogebeya
Amhara	Gondar Ketema Liyu	Arada
Amhara	Gondar Ketema Liyu	Azezo Tseda
Amhara	Gondar Ketema Liyu	Fasil
Amhara	Gondar Ketema Liyu	Gondar Ketama /Geter/ and Zobel
Amhara	Gondar Ketema Liyu	Jantekel
Amhara	Gondar Ketema Liyu	Maraki
Amhara	Maekelawi Gonder	Alefa
Amhara	Maekelawi Gonder	Aykel Ketema Astedader
Amhara	Maekelawi Gonder	Chilga
Amhara	Maekelawi Gonder	Gonder Zuriya
Amhara	Maekelawi Gonder	Kinfaz Begela
Amhara	Maekelawi Gonder	Lay Armachiho
Amhara	Maekelawi Gonder	Mirabbelesa
Amhara	Maekelawi Gonder	Mirabdembiya
Amhara	Maekelawi Gonder	Misrak Belesa
Amhara	Maekelawi Gonder	Misrak Dembiya
Amhara	Maekelawi Gonder	Tachi Armachiho
Amhara	Maekelawi Gonder	Takusa
Amhara	Maekelawi Gonder	Tegedie
Amhara	Maekelawi Gonder	Wogera
Amhara	Mirab Gojjam	Burie Ketema Astedader
Amhara	Mirab Gojjam	Burie Zuria
Amhara	Mirab Gojjam	Dega Damot
Amhara	Mirab Gojjam	Dembecha
Amhara	Mirab Gojjam	Dembecha Ketema Astedader
Amhara	Mirab Gojjam	Finoteselam Ketema Astedader
Amhara	Mirab Gojjam	Jebitehnan
Amhara	Mirab Gojjam	Quarit
Amhara	Mirab Gojjam	Sekela
Amhara	Mirab Gojjam	Womberma
Amhara	Mirab Gonder	Gendewuha Ketema
Amhara	Mirab Gonder	Merab Armachiho
Amhara	Mirab Gonder	Metema
Amhara	Mirab Gonder	Metema Yohannes Ketema Astedader
Amhara	Mirab Gonder	Midre Genet Ketema Astedader
Amhara	Mirab Gonder	Quara
Amhara	Misrak Gojjam	Aneded
Amhara	Misrak Gojjam	Awabel
Amhara	Misrak Gojjam	Baso_liben
Amhara	Misrak Gojjam	Bibugn
Amhara	Misrak Gojjam	Bichena Ketema Astedader
Amhara	Misrak Gojjam	Debay Tilat Gin
Amhara	Misrak Gojjam	Debre Elias
Amhara	Misrak Gojjam	Debre Markos
Amhara	Misrak Gojjam	Dejen
Amhara	Misrak Gojjam	Dejen Ketema Astedader
Amhara	Misrak Gojjam	Enarji Ena Enawuga
Amhara	Misrak Gojjam	Enebsie Sar Midir
Amhara	Misrak Gojjam	Enemay
Amhara	Misrak Gojjam	Goncha Siso Enese
Amhara	Misrak Gojjam	Gozamen
Amhara	Misrak Gojjam	Hulet Eju Enese
Amhara	Misrak Gojjam	Machakel
Amhara	Misrak Gojjam	Mota Ketema Astedader
Amhara	Misrak Gojjam	Sede
Amhara	Misrak Gojjam	Shebel Berenta
Amhara	Misrak Gojjam	Sinan
Amhara	Oromiya Liyu	Arituma Fursi
Amhara	Oromiya Liyu	Bati
Amhara	Oromiya Liyu	Bati Ketema Astedader
Amhara	Oromiya Liyu	Dewa Chefa
Amhara	Oromiya Liyu	Dewe Harawa
Amhara	Oromiya Liyu	Jile Timuga
Amhara	Oromiya Liyu	Kemisse
Amhara	Ras Dashen Terara Biherawi Paark	Ras Dashen Terara Biherawi Paark
Amhara	Semen Gojjam	Adet Town Administration
Amhara	Semen Gojjam	Bahirdar Zuriya
Amhara	Semen Gojjam	Debub Achefer
Amhara	Semen Gojjam	Debub Mecha
Amhara	Semen Gojjam	Durbete Ketema Astedader
Amhara	Semen Gojjam	Gonje Kolela
Amhara	Semen Gojjam	Merawi Ketema Astedader
Amhara	Semen Gojjam	Semen Achefer
Amhara	Semen Gojjam	Semen Mecha
Amhara	Semen Gojjam	Yilmana Densa
Amhara	Semen Gonder	Adi Arkay
Amhara	Semen Gonder	Beyeda
Amhara	Semen Gonder	Dabat
Amhara	Semen Gonder	Dabat Ketema Astedader
Amhara	Semen Gonder	Debark
Amhara	Semen Gonder	Debark City Administration
Amhara	Semen Gonder	Janamora
Amhara	Semen Gonder	Telemit
Amhara	Semen Shewa	Alemketema Town Administration
Amhara	Semen Shewa	Angolelanatera
Amhara	Semen Shewa	Ankober
Amhara	Semen Shewa	Antsokia Gemza
Amhara	Semen Shewa	Arerti Town Administration
Amhara	Semen Shewa	Asagrt
Amhara	Semen Shewa	Ataye Town Administration
Amhara	Semen Shewa	Basso Ena Werena
Amhara	Semen Shewa	Berehet
Amhara	Semen Shewa	Bulga Town Administration
Amhara	Semen Shewa	Debre Birhan
Amhara	Semen Shewa	Debre sina Town Administration
Amhara	Semen Shewa	Eenewari Town Administration
Amhara	Semen Shewa	Efratana Gidim
Amhara	Semen Shewa	Ensaro
Amhara	Semen Shewa	Geshe
Amhara	Semen Shewa	Hagere Maryam Kesem
Amhara	Semen Shewa	Kewot
Amhara	Semen Shewa	Mehalmeda
Amhara	Semen Shewa	Menz Gera Midere
Amhara	Semen Shewa	Menz Keya Gebrael
Amhara	Semen Shewa	Menz Mama Midir
Amhara	Semen Shewa	Menzlalo
Amhara	Semen Shewa	Merehabetie
Amhara	Semen Shewa	Mida Woremo
Amhara	Semen Shewa	Minjar Shonkora
Amhara	Semen Shewa	Mojana Wedera
Amhara	Semen Shewa	Molale Town Administration
Amhara	Semen Shewa	Moretna Jiru
Amhara	Semen Shewa	Saya Debirna Wayu
Amhara	Semen Shewa	Shewarobit Town Administration
Amhara	Semen Shewa	Tarmaber
Amhara	Semen Wello	Angot
Amhara	Semen Wello	Bugna
Amhara	Semen Wello	Dawunt
Amhara	Semen Wello	Gazo
Amhara	Semen Wello	Gidan
Amhara	Semen Wello	Gubalafto
Amhara	Semen Wello	Habiru
Amhara	Semen Wello	Kobo Ketema
Amhara	Semen Wello	Lalibela Ketema Astedader
Amhara	Semen Wello	Lasta
Amhara	Semen Wello	Meket
Amhara	Semen Wello	Mersa Ketema Astedader
Amhara	Semen Wello	Raya Kobo
Amhara	Semen Wello	Wadila
Amhara	Semen Wello	Weldiya Ketema Astedader
Amhara	Waghimra	Abergele
Amhara	Waghimra	Dehana
Amhara	Waghimra	Gazgibla
Amhara	Waghimra	Sahla Seyemt
Amhara	Waghimra	Sekota Ketema Astedader
Amhara	Waghimra	Sekota Zuria
Amhara	Waghimra	Tsagibige
Amhara	Waghimra	Zikuala
Benishangul Gumuz	Assosa	Assosa
Benishangul Gumuz	Assosa	Bambasi
Benishangul Gumuz	Assosa	Homosha
Benishangul Gumuz	Assosa	Kurmuk
Benishangul Gumuz	Assosa	Menge
Benishangul Gumuz	Assosa	Odda Buldgilu
Benishangul Gumuz	Assosa	Sherqole
Benishangul Gumuz	Assosa	Woreda And
Benishangul Gumuz	Assosa	Woreda Hulet
Benishangul Gumuz	Kemashi	Agalo Meti
Benishangul Gumuz	Kemashi	Bello Jiganfoy
Benishangul Gumuz	Kemashi	Kemashi
Benishangul Gumuz	Kemashi	Sedal
Benishangul Gumuz	Kemashi	Yasso
Benishangul Gumuz	Mao Ena Komo	Mao Ena Komo
Benishangul Gumuz	Metekel	Bulen
Benishangul Gumuz	Metekel	Dangur
Benishangul Gumuz	Metekel	Debate
Benishangul Gumuz	Metekel	Guba
Benishangul Gumuz	Metekel	Mandura
Benishangul Gumuz	Metekel	Pawe
Benishangul Gumuz	Metekel	Wombera
Central Ethiopia	Gurage	Abashige
Central Ethiopia	Gurage	Agena Ketema Astedader
Central Ethiopia	Gurage	Arekit Ketema Astedader
Central Ethiopia	Gurage	Cheha
Central Ethiopia	Gurage	Emdiber Ketema Astedader
Central Ethiopia	Gurage	Endegagn
Central Ethiopia	Gurage	Enor
Central Ethiopia	Gurage	Enor Ener Mager
Central Ethiopia	Gurage	Ezha
Central Ethiopia	Gurage	Gedebano Gutazar Welene
Central Ethiopia	Gurage	Geta
Central Ethiopia	Gurage	Gumer
Central Ethiopia	Gurage	Gunchire Ketema Astedader
Central Ethiopia	Gurage	Mihur Ena Aklil
Central Ethiopia	Gurage	Wolkite Ketema Astedader
Central Ethiopia	Hadiya	Ameka
Central Ethiopia	Hadiya	Analemmo
Central Ethiopia	Hadiya	Bonosha Town Administration
Central Ethiopia	Hadiya	Duna
Central Ethiopia	Hadiya	Fonko Town Administration
Central Ethiopia	Hadiya	Gembora
Central Ethiopia	Hadiya	Gibe
Central Ethiopia	Hadiya	Gimbichu Ketema Astedader
Central Ethiopia	Hadiya	Homecho Town Administration
Central Ethiopia	Hadiya	Hosana
Central Ethiopia	Hadiya	Jajura Ketema Astedader
Central Ethiopia	Hadiya	Limu
Central Ethiopia	Hadiya	Merab Badawacho
Central Ethiopia	Hadiya	Mirab Soro
Central Ethiopia	Hadiya	Misha
Central Ethiopia	Hadiya	Misrak Badowoch
Central Ethiopia	Hadiya	Shashego
Central Ethiopia	Hadiya	Shone City Admin
Central Ethiopia	Hadiya	Siraro Badowoch
Central Ethiopia	Hadiya	Soro
Central Ethiopia	Halaba	Atoti Ulo
Central Ethiopia	Halaba	Halaba Ketema Astedader
Central Ethiopia	Halaba	Wera
Central Ethiopia	Halaba	Wera Dijo
Central Ethiopia	Kabena Liyu	Kabena Liyu
Central Ethiopia	Kembata	Adiloo Zuriya
Central Ethiopia	Kembata	Angecha
Central Ethiopia	Kembata	Angecha Ketema Astedader
Central Ethiopia	Kembata	Damboya
Central Ethiopia	Kembata	Damboya Keteme Astededar
Central Ethiopia	Kembata	Doyogena
Central Ethiopia	Kembata	Doyogena
Central Ethiopia	Kembata	Durame Keteme Astedader
Central Ethiopia	Kembata	Hadaro Ketema Astidadar
Central Ethiopia	Kembata	Hadaro Tunto
Central Ethiopia	Kembata	Kachabira
Central Ethiopia	Kembata	Kedida Gamella
Central Ethiopia	Kembata	Shinshicho Ketema Astedader
Central Ethiopia	Mareko Liyu	Mareko Liyu
Central Ethiopia	Misrak Gurage	Bui Ketema Astedader
Central Ethiopia	Misrak Gurage	Butajira Ketema Astedader
Central Ethiopia	Misrak Gurage	Debub Sodo
Central Ethiopia	Misrak Gurage	Enseno Ketema Astedader
Central Ethiopia	Misrak Gurage	Meskan
Central Ethiopia	Misrak Gurage	Misrak Meskan
Central Ethiopia	Misrak Gurage	Sodo
Central Ethiopia	Silte	Alem Gebeya Ketema Astedader
Central Ethiopia	Silte	Alicho Wiriro
Central Ethiopia	Silte	Dalocha
Central Ethiopia	Silte	Dalocha Ketema Astedader
Central Ethiopia	Silte	Hulbareg
Central Ethiopia	Silte	Kibet Ketema Astedader
Central Ethiopia	Silte	Lanfuro
Central Ethiopia	Silte	Mirab Azernet Berbere
Central Ethiopia	Silte	Misrak Azernet Berbere
Central Ethiopia	Silte	Misrak Silte
Central Ethiopia	Silte	Mito
Central Ethiopia	Silte	Sankura
Central Ethiopia	Silte	Silte
Central Ethiopia	Silte	Tora Ketema Astedader
Central Ethiopia	Silte	Worabe Ketema Astedader
Central Ethiopia	Tembaro Leyu	Mudula Ketema Astedader
Central Ethiopia	Tembaro Leyu	Tembaro
Central Ethiopia	Yem	Dori Saja
Central Ethiopia	Yem	Fofa
Central Ethiopia	Yem	Saja Ketama Astedader
Central Ethiopia	Yem	Toba
Dire Dawa Astedadar	Dire Dawa	01 Woreda Astedadar
Dire Dawa Astedadar	Dire Dawa	02 Woreda Astedadar
Dire Dawa Astedadar	Dire Dawa	03 Woreda Astedadar
Dire Dawa Astedadar	Dire Dawa	04 Woreda Astedadar
Dire Dawa Astedadar	Dire Dawa	05 Woreda Astedadar
Dire Dawa Astedadar	Dire Dawa	06 Woreda Astedadar
Dire Dawa Astedadar	Dire Dawa	07 Woreda Astedadar
Dire Dawa Astedadar	Dire Dawa	08 Woreda Astedadar
Dire Dawa Astedadar	Dire Dawa	09 Woreda Astedadar
Dire Dawa Astedadar	Dire Dawa	Aseliso
Dire Dawa Astedadar	Dire Dawa	Biyo Awale
Dire Dawa Astedadar	Dire Dawa	Jaldesa/Kelad
Dire Dawa Astedadar	Dire Dawa	Wahil
Ethiopia Somali	Afder	Bare
Ethiopia Somali	Afder	Chereti
Ethiopia Somali	Afder	Dolo Bay
Ethiopia Somali	Afder	Elkere
Ethiopia Somali	Afder	Godgod
Ethiopia Somali	Afder	Haregele
Ethiopia Somali	Afder	Kohle
Ethiopia Somali	Afder	Mirab Emiy
Ethiopia Somali	Afder	Raaso
Ethiopia Somali	Dawa	Hudet
Ethiopia Somali	Dawa	Kadaduma
Ethiopia Somali	Dawa	Moyale
Ethiopia Somali	Dawa	Mubarek
Ethiopia Somali	Dollo	Boh
Ethiopia Somali	Dollo	Danot
Ethiopia Somali	Dollo	Daratole
Ethiopia Somali	Dollo	Galladi
Ethiopia Somali	Dollo	Gelahemur
Ethiopia Somali	Dollo	Lehel Yuob
Ethiopia Somali	Dollo	Warder
Ethiopia Somali	Dollo	Warder ketema astedader
Ethiopia Somali	Erer	Fiqi
Ethiopia Somali	Erer	Hamero
Ethiopia Somali	Erer	Legahida
Ethiopia Somali	Erer	Meyu Muliqe
Ethiopia Somali	Erer	Qubi
Ethiopia Somali	Erer	Selihad
Ethiopia Somali	Erer	Wangey
Ethiopia Somali	Erer	Yohob
Ethiopia Somali	Fafan	Awebera
Ethiopia Somali	Fafan	Babile
Ethiopia Somali	Fafan	Debub Jigjiga
Ethiopia Somali	Fafan	Golgeno
Ethiopia Somali	Fafan	Gursum
Ethiopia Somali	Fafan	Harewa
Ethiopia Somali	Fafan	Harores
Ethiopia Somali	Fafan	Harshin
Ethiopia Somali	Fafan	Jijiga
Ethiopia Somali	Fafan	Qebribeyah
Ethiopia Somali	Fafan	Qoran Mula
Ethiopia Somali	Fafan	Togochale City Admenistration
Ethiopia Somali	Fafan	Tulu Guled
Ethiopia Somali	Jerer	Ararso
Ethiopia Somali	Jerer	Aware
Ethiopia Somali	Jerer	Bilebur
Ethiopia Somali	Jerer	Buriqot
Ethiopia Somali	Jerer	Daror
Ethiopia Somali	Jerer	Degamedo
Ethiopia Somali	Jerer	Degehabur
Ethiopia Somali	Jerer	Degehabur City Administration
Ethiopia Somali	Jerer	Dig
Ethiopia Somali	Jerer	Gashamo
Ethiopia Somali	Jerer	Gunegedo
Ethiopia Somali	Jerer	Yoale
Ethiopia Somali	Korahe	Bodelay
Ethiopia Somali	Korahe	Debawayin
Ethiopia Somali	Korahe	El_ogaden
Ethiopia Somali	Korahe	Gogilo
Ethiopia Somali	Korahe	Higilola
Ethiopia Somali	Korahe	Kebridehar
Ethiopia Somali	Korahe	Lasdenkere
Ethiopia Somali	Korahe	Marsin
Ethiopia Somali	Korahe	Qebridahar Citiy Administration
Ethiopia Somali	Korahe	Shakosh
Ethiopia Somali	Korahe	Shilabo
Ethiopia Somali	Liben	Bokolmayu
Ethiopia Somali	Liben	Deka Softu
Ethiopia Somali	Liben	Dolo Addo
Ethiopia Somali	Liben	Filtu
Ethiopia Somali	Liben	Goro Bekeksa
Ethiopia Somali	Liben	Gura Damole
Ethiopia Somali	Liben	Karssa Dula
Ethiopia Somali	Nogob	Ayun
Ethiopia Somali	Nogob	Duhun
Ethiopia Somali	Nogob	Elweyne
Ethiopia Somali	Nogob	Gerbo
Ethiopia Somali	Nogob	Hararey
Ethiopia Somali	Nogob	Haroshegah
Ethiopia Somali	Nogob	Sagage
Ethiopia Somali	Shebele	Abaqero
Ethiopia Somali	Shebele	Adadle
Ethiopia Somali	Shebele	Beerano
Ethiopia Somali	Shebele	Danan
Ethiopia Somali	Shebele	East Eme
Ethiopia Somali	Shebele	Elelle
Ethiopia Somali	Shebele	Ferfer
Ethiopia Somali	Shebele	Gode
Ethiopia Somali	Shebele	Gode Council
Ethiopia Somali	Shebele	Kelafo
Ethiopia Somali	Shebele	Mustahil
Ethiopia Somali	Siti	Afdem
Ethiopia Somali	Siti	Aysha
Ethiopia Somali	Siti	Dembel
Ethiopia Somali	Siti	Erer
Ethiopia Somali	Siti	Geblalu
Ethiopia Somali	Siti	Gotabike
Ethiopia Somali	Siti	Hadigala
Ethiopia Somali	Siti	Me'Aso
Ethiopia Somali	Siti	Shinile
Gambela	Angewak	Abobo
Gambela	Angewak	Dima
Gambela	Angewak	Gambela Zuriya
Gambela	Angewak	Gambella
Gambela	Angewak	Gog
Gambela	Angewak	Jor
Gambela	Itang Special	Itang
Gambela	Mejenger	Godere
Gambela	Mejenger	Mengeshi
Gambela	Newer	Akobo
Gambela	Newer	Jikawo
Gambela	Newer	Lare
Gambela	Newer	Makoy
Gambela	Newer	Wantawo
Hareri	Hareri	Abadir
Hareri	Hareri	Aboker
Hareri	Hareri	Amir Nur
Hareri	Hareri	Dire Teyara
Hareri	Hareri	Errer
Hareri	Hareri	Hakim
Hareri	Hareri	Jinela
Hareri	Hareri	Shenkor
Hareri	Hareri	Sofi
Oromia	Adama Liyu	Aba Geda
Oromia	Adama Liyu	Bale
Oromia	Adama Liyu	Boku
Oromia	Adama Liyu	Denibel
Oromia	Adama Liyu	Dibe
Oromia	Adama Liyu	Logo
Oromia	Ambo City Admin	Ambo
Oromia	Arsi	Amigna
Oromia	Arsi	Aseko
Oromia	Arsi	Bekoji City Admin
Oromia	Arsi	Bele Gesigar
Oromia	Arsi	Chole
Oromia	Arsi	Digalu Na Tijo
Oromia	Arsi	Diksis
Oromia	Arsi	Dodota
Oromia	Arsi	Gololcha
Oromia	Arsi	Guna
Oromia	Arsi	Hitosa
Oromia	Arsi	Honkolo Wabe
Oromia	Arsi	Jeju
Oromia	Arsi	Lemu Na Bilbilo
Oromia	Arsi	Lodehitosa
Oromia	Arsi	Merti
Oromia	Arsi	Munesa
Oromia	Arsi	Robe
Oromia	Arsi	Seru
Oromia	Arsi	Shanen Kolu
Oromia	Arsi	Shirka
Oromia	Arsi	Sire
Oromia	Arsi	Sude
Oromia	Arsi	Tena
Oromia	Arsi	Tiyo
Oromia	Arsi	Zewaydugda
Oromia	Asela Liyu	Assela
Oromia	Bishan Guracha Liyu	Bishan Guracha City Adiminestration
Oromia	Bishoftu	Abusera
Oromia	Bishoftu	Arsede
Oromia	Bishoftu	Biftu
Oromia	Bishoftu	Deka Bora
Oromia	Bishoftu	Dire
Oromia	Bishoftu	Erere
Oromia	Bishoftu	Hora
Oromia	Bishoftu	Kilole
Oromia	Bishoftu	Melka
Oromia	Bishoftu	Oda Nebe
Oromia	Bishoftu	Tedecha
Oromia	Borena	Dilo
Oromia	Borena	Dire
Oromia	Borena	Dubluk
Oromia	Borena	El Waye
Oromia	Borena	Gomole
Oromia	Borena	Guchi
Oromia	Borena	Miyo
Oromia	Borena	Moyale
Oromia	Borena	Teltele
Oromia	Borena	Yabalo
Oromia	Borena	Yabelo Twon
Oromia	Buno Bedele	Bedele Zuriya
Oromia	Buno Bedele	Bedelle
Oromia	Buno Bedele	Borecha
Oromia	Buno Bedele	Chewaka
Oromia	Buno Bedele	Chora
Oromia	Buno Bedele	Dabo Hana
Oromia	Buno Bedele	Dega
Oromia	Buno Bedele	Didessa
Oromia	Buno Bedele	Gechi
Oromia	Buno Bedele	Makko
Oromia	Debub Mirab Shewa	Ameya
Oromia	Debub Mirab Shewa	Bacho
Oromia	Debub Mirab Shewa	Dawo
Oromia	Debub Mirab Shewa	Goro
Oromia	Debub Mirab Shewa	Ilu
Oromia	Debub Mirab Shewa	Kersa Malima
Oromia	Debub Mirab Shewa	Saden Soddo
Oromia	Debub Mirab Shewa	Sodo Dachi
Oromia	Debub Mirab Shewa	Tole
Oromia	Debub Mirab Shewa	Wenchi
Oromia	Debub Mirab Shewa	Woliso
Oromia	Dodola Ketema Astedader	Dodola Ketema Astedader
Oromia	Guji	Adola
Oromia	Guji	Adola Wayu Ketema
Oromia	Guji	Aga Wayu
Oromia	Guji	Anasora
Oromia	Guji	Bore
Oromia	Guji	Dama
Oromia	Guji	Gereja
Oromia	Guji	Haro Welabu
Oromia	Guji	Odo Shakiso
Oromia	Guji	Seba Boru
Oromia	Guji	Shakiso Ketema Astedader
Oromia	Guji	Uraga
Oromia	Guji	Wadara
Oromia	Holeta Liyu	Holeta
Oromia	Horo Guduru Wollega	Abaychoman
Oromia	Horo Guduru Wollega	Abedongoro
Oromia	Horo Guduru Wollega	Amuru
Oromia	Horo Guduru Wollega	Chemon Guduru
Oromia	Horo Guduru Wollega	Guduru
Oromia	Horo Guduru Wollega	Hababoguduru
Oromia	Horo Guduru Wollega	Horo
Oromia	Horo Guduru Wollega	Horo Buluk
Oromia	Horo Guduru Wollega	Horo(shambu)
Oromia	Horo Guduru Wollega	Jardaga Jarte
Oromia	Horo Guduru Wollega	Jimarare
Oromia	Horo Guduru Wollega	Jimmagenate
Oromia	Ilu Ababor	Alge Sachi
Oromia	Ilu Ababor	Alle
Oromia	Ilu Ababor	Bacho
Oromia	Ilu Ababor	Bilo Nopa
Oromia	Ilu Ababor	Bure
Oromia	Ilu Ababor	Darimu
Oromia	Ilu Ababor	Didu
Oromia	Ilu Ababor	Doranni
Oromia	Ilu Ababor	Halu
Oromia	Ilu Ababor	Hurumu
Oromia	Ilu Ababor	Mettu
Oromia	Ilu Ababor	Metu Ketema
Oromia	Ilu Ababor	Nono Sele
Oromia	Ilu Ababor	Yayo
Oromia	Jimma	Agaro
Oromia	Jimma	Boter Tolay
Oromia	Jimma	Cora Botar
Oromia	Jimma	Dedo
Oromia	Jimma	Gera
Oromia	Jimma	Gomma
Oromia	Jimma	Gumay
Oromia	Jimma	Kersa
Oromia	Jimma	Limu Kosa
Oromia	Jimma	Limu Seka
Oromia	Jimma	Mana
Oromia	Jimma	Mencho
Oromia	Jimma	Nono Benja
Oromia	Jimma	Omo Beyam
Oromia	Jimma	Omo Nada
Oromia	Jimma	Seka Chekorsa
Oromia	Jimma	Setema
Oromia	Jimma	Shebe Sonbo
Oromia	Jimma	Sigimo
Oromia	Jimma	Sokoru
Oromia	Jimma	Tiroafeta
Oromia	Jimma Liyu	Jimma
Oromia	Kelem Wollega	Anfilo
Oromia	Kelem Wollega	Chanka Woreda
Oromia	Kelem Wollega	Dalle Sadi
Oromia	Kelem Wollega	Dallewabara
Oromia	Kelem Wollega	Dambi Dollo Town
Oromia	Kelem Wollega	Gawo Kebe
Oromia	Kelem Wollega	Gidami
Oromia	Kelem Wollega	Hawagalan
Oromia	Kelem Wollega	Jima Horo
Oromia	Kelem Wollega	Laloqile
Oromia	Kelem Wollega	Seyo
Oromia	Kelem Wollega	Yemalogi Walal
Oromia	Merab Bale	Agarfa
Oromia	Merab Bale	Arena Buluk
Oromia	Merab Bale	Berbere
Oromia	Merab Bale	Delo Mena
Oromia	Merab Bale	Dinsho
Oromia	Merab Bale	Gasera
Oromia	Merab Bale	Goba
Oromia	Merab Bale	Goba Ketema
Oromia	Merab Bale	Goro
Oromia	Merab Bale	Gura Damole
Oromia	Merab Bale	Sinana
Oromia	Mirab Arsi	Adaba
Oromia	Mirab Arsi	Arsi Negele
Oromia	Mirab Arsi	Arsi Negele City Administration
Oromia	Mirab Arsi	Dodola
Oromia	Mirab Arsi	Gadeb Asesa
Oromia	Mirab Arsi	Heben Arsi
Oromia	Mirab Arsi	Kofale
Oromia	Mirab Arsi	Kokossa
Oromia	Mirab Arsi	Kore
Oromia	Mirab Arsi	Nensebo
Oromia	Mirab Arsi	Shala
Oromia	Mirab Arsi	Shashemane
Oromia	Mirab Arsi	Siraro
Oromia	Mirab Arsi	Wendo
Oromia	Mirab Guji	Abaya
Oromia	Mirab Guji	Birbirsa Kojowa
Oromia	Mirab Guji	Bule Hora
Oromia	Mirab Guji	Bule Hora Town
Oromia	Mirab Guji	Dugda Dawa
Oromia	Mirab Guji	Galana
Oromia	Mirab Guji	Hambela Wamena
Oromia	Mirab Guji	Kercha
Oromia	Mirab Guji	Malka Sodda
Oromia	Mirab Guji	Soro Barrguda
Oromia	Mirab Hararghe	Ancar
Oromia	Mirab Hararghe	Bedesa Town Administration
Oromia	Mirab Hararghe	Boke
Oromia	Mirab Hararghe	Burka Dhintu
Oromia	Mirab Hararghe	Chiro
Oromia	Mirab Hararghe	Chiro Town Administration
Oromia	Mirab Hararghe	Daro Labu
Oromia	Mirab Hararghe	Doba
Oromia	Mirab Hararghe	Gelemso Town Administration
Oromia	Mirab Hararghe	Gemechis
Oromia	Mirab Hararghe	Guba Koricha
Oromia	Mirab Hararghe	Gumbi Bordede
Oromia	Mirab Hararghe	Habro
Oromia	Mirab Hararghe	Hawi Gudina
Oromia	Mirab Hararghe	Hirna Town Administration
Oromia	Mirab Hararghe	Machara_Miceta Town Administration
Oromia	Mirab Hararghe	Mesela
Oromia	Mirab Hararghe	Mieso
Oromia	Mirab Hararghe	Oda Bultum
Oromia	Mirab Hararghe	Tulo
Oromia	Mirab Shewa	Abuna Gindeberet
Oromia	Mirab Shewa	Adea Berga
Oromia	Mirab Shewa	Ambo Zuriyai
Oromia	Mirab Shewa	Bako Tibe
Oromia	Mirab Shewa	Cheliya
Oromia	Mirab Shewa	Cobi
Oromia	Mirab Shewa	Dano
Oromia	Mirab Shewa	Dendi
Oromia	Mirab Shewa	Dire Inchini
Oromia	Mirab Shewa	Ejere
Oromia	Mirab Shewa	Ejersa Lafo
Oromia	Mirab Shewa	Elfeta
Oromia	Mirab Shewa	Gindeberet
Oromia	Mirab Shewa	Ilu Galan
Oromia	Mirab Shewa	Jawi Liban
Oromia	Mirab Shewa	Jeldu
Oromia	Mirab Shewa	Jibat
Oromia	Mirab Shewa	Medakegn
Oromia	Mirab Shewa	Meta Robi
Oromia	Mirab Shewa	Meta Walkite
Oromia	Mirab Shewa	Nono
Oromia	Mirab Shewa	Toke Kutaye
Oromia	Mirab Wollega	Ayira
Oromia	Mirab Wollega	Babo Gambel
Oromia	Mirab Wollega	Begi
Oromia	Mirab Wollega	Boji Chokorsa
Oromia	Mirab Wollega	Bojidimaji
Oromia	Mirab Wollega	Ganji
Oromia	Mirab Wollega	Gimbi
Oromia	Mirab Wollega	Gimbi Town
Oromia	Mirab Wollega	Guliso
Oromia	Mirab Wollega	Haru
Oromia	Mirab Wollega	Homa
Oromia	Mirab Wollega	Jarso
Oromia	Mirab Wollega	Kiltu Kara
Oromia	Mirab Wollega	Kondala
Oromia	Mirab Wollega	Lalo Asabi
Oromia	Mirab Wollega	Leta Sibu
Oromia	Mirab Wollega	Mana Sibu
Oromia	Mirab Wollega	Mandi Town
Oromia	Mirab Wollega	Nejo
Oromia	Mirab Wollega	Nejo Town
Oromia	Mirab Wollega	Nole Kaba
Oromia	Mirab Wollega	Seyo Nole
Oromia	Mirab Wollega	Yubdo
Oromia	Misrak Bale	Dawe Kachin
Oromia	Misrak Bale	Dawe Serer
Oromia	Misrak Bale	Ginir
Oromia	Misrak Bale	Ginir Ketema Astedader
Oromia	Misrak Bale	Gololcha
Oromia	Misrak Bale	Legahida
Oromia	Misrak Bale	Rayitu
Oromia	Misrak Bale	Seweyna
Oromia	Misrak Borena	Arero
Oromia	Misrak Borena	Dhasi
Oromia	Misrak Borena	Goro Dola
Oromia	Misrak Borena	Gumi Eldalo
Oromia	Misrak Borena	Liben
Oromia	Misrak Borena	Meda Welabu
Oromia	Misrak Borena	Negele Ketema Astedader
Oromia	Misrak Borena	Wachile
Oromia	Misrak Hararge	Aweday Ketema
Oromia	Misrak Hararge	Babile
Oromia	Misrak Hararge	Babile City Admin
Oromia	Misrak Hararge	Bedeno
Oromia	Misrak Hararge	Chinaksen
Oromia	Misrak Hararge	Deder
Oromia	Misrak Hararge	Deder Ketema Asetedader
Oromia	Misrak Hararge	Fedis
Oromia	Misrak Hararge	Girawa
Oromia	Misrak Hararge	Golo Oda
Oromia	Misrak Hararge	Goro Muti
Oromia	Misrak Hararge	Gorogutu
Oromia	Misrak Hararge	Gursum
Oromia	Misrak Hararge	Haremaya
Oromia	Misrak Hararge	Haremaya Ketema
Oromia	Misrak Hararge	Jarso
Oromia	Misrak Hararge	Kersa
Oromia	Misrak Hararge	Kombolcha
Oromia	Misrak Hararge	Kumbi
Oromia	Misrak Hararge	Kurfa Chele
Oromia	Misrak Hararge	Melka Belo
Oromia	Misrak Hararge	Meta
Oromia	Misrak Hararge	Meyu Muluke
Oromia	Misrak Hararge	Midaga Tola
Oromia	Misrak Shewa	Adama
Oromia	Misrak Shewa	Adamitulu
Oromia	Misrak Shewa	Adea
Oromia	Misrak Shewa	Akeki
Oromia	Misrak Shewa	Batu Ketema Astedader
Oromia	Misrak Shewa	Bora
Oromia	Misrak Shewa	Boset
Oromia	Misrak Shewa	Dugda
Oromia	Misrak Shewa	Fentale
Oromia	Misrak Shewa	Gimbichu
Oromia	Misrak Shewa	Liben Chukala
Oromia	Misrak Shewa	Lume
Oromia	Misrak Wollega	Anger Gute Town
Oromia	Misrak Wollega	Bonayaboshe
Oromia	Misrak Wollega	Diga
Oromia	Misrak Wollega	Ebantu
Oromia	Misrak Wollega	Gida Ayana
Oromia	Misrak Wollega	Gobu Seyo
Oromia	Misrak Wollega	Gudaya Bila
Oromia	Misrak Wollega	Gutogida
Oromia	Misrak Wollega	Haro Limu
Oromia	Misrak Wollega	Jima Arjo
Oromia	Misrak Wollega	Kiramu
Oromia	Misrak Wollega	Leka Dulecha
Oromia	Misrak Wollega	Limu
Oromia	Misrak Wollega	Nunu Kumba
Oromia	Misrak Wollega	Sasiga
Oromia	Misrak Wollega	Sibu Sire
Oromia	Misrak Wollega	Wama Hagelo
Oromia	Misrak Wollega	Wayu Tuqa
Oromia	Modjo Liyu	Modjo
Oromia	Nekemte Liyu	Nekemte
Oromia	Oromiya Liyu	Berak
Oromia	Oromiya Liyu	Mulo
Oromia	Oromiya Liyu	Sabata Hawas
Oromia	Oromiya Liyu	Sendafa Bake
Oromia	Oromiya Liyu	Sululta
Oromia	Oromiya Liyu	Walmara
Oromia	Robe Liyu	Robe Ketema Astedader
Oromia	Semen Shewa	Abichu And Gnea Woreda
Oromia	Semen Shewa	Aleltu
Oromia	Semen Shewa	Dagam
Oromia	Semen Shewa	Darra
Oromia	Semen Shewa	Debre Libanos
Oromia	Semen Shewa	Fiche
Oromia	Semen Shewa	Girar Jarso
Oromia	Semen Shewa	Hidebu Abote
Oromia	Semen Shewa	Jida
Oromia	Semen Shewa	Kimbibit
Oromia	Semen Shewa	Kuyu
Oromia	Semen Shewa	Wara Jarso
Oromia	Semen Shewa	Wuchale
Oromia	Semen Shewa	Yaya Gulele
Oromia	Shashamane Liyu	Shashamane Ketema
Oromia	Sheger	Abbaa Gadaa
Oromia	Sheger	Akako
Oromia	Sheger	Andode
Oromia	Sheger	Anne Dima
Oromia	Sheger	Bero
Oromia	Sheger	Caffe
Oromia	Sheger	Chefe Karabu
Oromia	Sheger	Chefe Karabu
Oromia	Sheger	Dalleti
Oromia	Sheger	Denbel Tafo
Oromia	Sheger	Dire Sekoru
Oromia	Sheger	Eco Abeba Limat
Oromia	Sheger	Egdu
Oromia	Sheger	Ejersa Goro
Oromia	Sheger	Eka Saden
Oromia	Sheger	Geda Faji
Oromia	Sheger	Gefersa Burayu
Oromia	Sheger	Gelan
Oromia	Sheger	Gelan Arebsa
Oromia	Sheger	Gelan Guda
Oromia	Sheger	Gelan Guda
Oromia	Sheger	Gelan Guda
Oromia	Sheger	Guddu
Oromia	Sheger	Guje
Oromia	Sheger	Guje
Oromia	Sheger	Katta
Oromia	Sheger	Kolobo
Oromia	Sheger	Kura Jida
Oromia	Sheger	Lege Dadi Dale
Oromia	Sheger	Lekule Geja
Oromia	Sheger	Malka Gafarsa
Oromia	Sheger	Metta
Oromia	Sheger	Mogle
Oromia	Sheger	Mogle
Oromia	Sheger	Muda Furi
Oromia	Sheger	Nonno
Oromia	Sheger	Salam Abeba Limat
Oromia	Sheger	Sida Awash
Oromia	Sheger	Tele Ababa Limat
Oromia	Sheger	Tufa Muna
Oromia	Sheger	Tulu Dimtu
Oromia	Sheger	Wasarbi
Oromia	Sheger	Wedassa
Oromia	Sheger	Welgaho Legaberi
Oromia	Woliso Liyu	Woliso
Sidama	Hawassa City Administration	Adiss Ketema
Sidama	Hawassa City Administration	Bahel Adarash
Sidama	Hawassa City Administration	Haik Dar
Sidama	Hawassa City Administration	Hawela Tula
Sidama	Hawassa City Administration	Mehal Ketema
Sidama	Hawassa City Administration	Meneharya
Sidama	Hawassa City Administration	Misrak
Sidama	Hawassa City Administration	Tabor
Sidama	Sidama Debubawi	Aleta Chuko
Sidama	Sidama Debubawi	Aleta Wondo
Sidama	Sidama Debubawi	Aleta Wondo City Administration
Sidama	Sidama Debubawi	Bursa
Sidama	Sidama Debubawi	Chirone
Sidama	Sidama Debubawi	Chuko Ketema Asetedader
Sidama	Sidama Debubawi	Dara
Sidama	Sidama Debubawi	Dara Otilcho
Sidama	Sidama Debubawi	Hula
Sidama	Sidama Debubawi	Teticha
Sidama	Sidama Mehal	Arbegona
Sidama	Sidama Mehal	Dale
Sidama	Sidama Mehal	Darara
Sidama	Sidama Mehal	Loko Abaya
Sidama	Sidama Mehal	Shafamo
Sidama	Sidama Mehal	Wonsho
Sidama	Sidama Mehal	Yirgalem City Admin
Sidama	Sidama Misrakawi	Aroresa
Sidama	Sidama Misrakawi	Bensa
Sidama	Sidama Misrakawi	Bona Zuria
Sidama	Sidama Misrakawi	Bura
Sidama	Sidama Misrakawi	Chebe Gambeltu
Sidama	Sidama Misrakawi	Chire
Sidama	Sidama Misrakawi	Daela
Sidama	Sidama Misrakawi	Daye Ketema Astedader
Sidama	Sidama Misrakawi	Hoko
Sidama	Sidama Semenawi	Bilate Zuriya
Sidama	Sidama Semenawi	Boricha
Sidama	Sidama Semenawi	Chuko Ketema Asetedader
Sidama	Sidama Semenawi	Gorche
Sidama	Sidama Semenawi	Hawassa Zuriya
Sidama	Sidama Semenawi	Hawla Lida
Sidama	Sidama Semenawi	Leku Ketema Asetedader
Sidama	Sidama Semenawi	Malga
Sidama	Sidama Semenawi	Shebedino
Sidama	Sidama Semenawi	Wendo Genet
South Ethiopia	Alle	Kolango Ketema Astedader
South Ethiopia	Alle	Kolango Zuriya
South Ethiopia	Ari	Baka Dawela Ari
South Ethiopia	Ari	Debub Ari
South Ethiopia	Ari	Gelila Ketema Astedader
South Ethiopia	Ari	Jinka Ketema Astedader
South Ethiopia	Ari	Semen Ari
South Ethiopia	Ari	Woba Ari
South Ethiopia	Basketo Special	Basketo
South Ethiopia	Burji	Burji
South Ethiopia	Debub Omo	Bena Tsemay
South Ethiopia	Debub Omo	Dasenech
South Ethiopia	Debub Omo	Hamer
South Ethiopia	Debub Omo	Malle
South Ethiopia	Debub Omo	Nyangatom
South Ethiopia	Debub Omo	Salamago
South Ethiopia	Debub Omo	Turmi Ketema Astedader
South Ethiopia	Dilla City Admin	Dilla Bedecha Town
South Ethiopia	Dilla City Admin	Dilla Harowelabo Town
South Ethiopia	Dilla City Admin	Dilla Sessa Town
South Ethiopia	Gamo	Arba Minch Ketema Astededader
South Ethiopia	Gamo	Arbaminch Zuriya
South Ethiopia	Gamo	Bonke
South Ethiopia	Gamo	Boreda
South Ethiopia	Gamo	Chencha Ketema Asetedader
South Ethiopia	Gamo	Chencha Zuriya
South Ethiopia	Gamo	Deremalo
South Ethiopia	Gamo	Dita
South Ethiopia	Gamo	Gacho_Baba
South Ethiopia	Gamo	Garda Marta
South Ethiopia	Gamo	Geresse
South Ethiopia	Gamo	Geresse Ketema Astedader
South Ethiopia	Gamo	Kemba
South Ethiopia	Gamo	Kemba Ketema Astedader
South Ethiopia	Gamo	Mirab Abaya
South Ethiopia	Gamo	Qogota
South Ethiopia	Gamo	Qucha
South Ethiopia	Gamo	Qucha Alfa
South Ethiopia	Gamo	Selam Ber Ketema Asetedader
South Ethiopia	Gardula	Derashe
South Ethiopia	Gedeo	Bule
South Ethiopia	Gedeo	Dilla Zuria
South Ethiopia	Gedeo	Gedeb
South Ethiopia	Gedeo	Kochore
South Ethiopia	Gedeo	Wonago
South Ethiopia	Gedeo	Yirga Chefe
South Ethiopia	Gedeo	Yirga Chefe City Admin
South Ethiopia	Gofa	Beto Ketema Astedader
South Ethiopia	Gofa	Bulki Ketema Asetedader
South Ethiopia	Gofa	Denba Gofa
South Ethiopia	Gofa	Geze Gofa
South Ethiopia	Gofa	Melo Gada
South Ethiopia	Gofa	Melo Koza
South Ethiopia	Gofa	Oyida
South Ethiopia	Gofa	Sawula
South Ethiopia	Gofa	Uba Debretsehay
South Ethiopia	Gofa	Zala
South Ethiopia	Konso	Karate_City_Admin
South Ethiopia	Konso	Karate_Zuria
South Ethiopia	Konso	Kena
South Ethiopia	Konso	Kolme Cluster
South Ethiopia	Konso	Segen_Zuriya
South Ethiopia	korey	Amaro
South Ethiopia	Welayta	Abala Abaya
South Ethiopia	Welayta	Areka Ketema Astedader
South Ethiopia	Welayta	Bayra Koysha
South Ethiopia	Welayta	Bele Ketema Astedader
South Ethiopia	Welayta	Boditi Town
South Ethiopia	Welayta	Boloso Sore
South Ethiopia	Welayta	Bolosobombe
South Ethiopia	Welayta	Damot Sore
South Ethiopia	Welayta	Damot Weyde
South Ethiopia	Welayta	Damotgale
South Ethiopia	Welayta	Damotpulasa
South Ethiopia	Welayta	Duguna Fango
South Ethiopia	Welayta	Gesuba Ketema Astedader
South Ethiopia	Welayta	Gununo Hamuse Ketema Astedader
South Ethiopia	Welayta	Hobicha Abaya
South Ethiopia	Welayta	Humbo
South Ethiopia	Welayta	Kawo Koyisha
South Ethiopia	Welayta	Kindo Didaye
South Ethiopia	Welayta	Kindo Koisha
South Ethiopia	Welayta	Ofa
South Ethiopia	Welayta	Sodo Ketema Astedader
South Ethiopia	Welayta	Sodo Zuria
South Ethiopia	Welayta	Tebela Ketema Astedader
South West Ethiopia People	Bench Sheko	Debub Bench
South West Ethiopia People	Bench Sheko	Dizu-Gedi
South West Ethiopia People	Bench Sheko	Guraferda
South West Ethiopia People	Bench Sheko	Mizan Aman Ketema Astedader
South West Ethiopia People	Bench Sheko	Semen Benchmaji
South West Ethiopia People	Bench Sheko	Shay Bench
South West Ethiopia People	Bench Sheko	Sheko
South West Ethiopia People	Dawro	Disa
South West Ethiopia People	Dawro	Esera
South West Ethiopia People	Dawro	Gena
South West Ethiopia People	Dawro	Gena Bosa
South West Ethiopia People	Dawro	Gesa Chare Ketema Astedader
South West Ethiopia People	Dawro	Kechi
South West Ethiopia People	Dawro	Loma
South West Ethiopia People	Dawro	Maraka
South West Ethiopia People	Dawro	Mari Mansa
South West Ethiopia People	Dawro	Tarcha Ketema Astedader
South West Ethiopia People	Dawro	Tarcha Zuriya
South West Ethiopia People	Dawro	Tocha
South West Ethiopia People	Kefa	Adiyo
South West Ethiopia People	Kefa	Bita
South West Ethiopia People	Kefa	Bonga
South West Ethiopia People	Kefa	Chena
South West Ethiopia People	Kefa	Cheta
South West Ethiopia People	Kefa	Decha
South West Ethiopia People	Kefa	Gesha Deka
South West Ethiopia People	Kefa	Gewata
South West Ethiopia People	Kefa	Gimbo
South West Ethiopia People	Kefa	Goba
South West Ethiopia People	Kefa	Saylem
South West Ethiopia People	Kefa	Sheshoendey
South West Ethiopia People	Kefa	Telo
South West Ethiopia People	Kefa	Wacha City Administrator
South West Ethiopia People	Konta	Konta Liyu
South West Ethiopia People	Merab Omo	Bero
South West Ethiopia People	Merab Omo	Gachit
South West Ethiopia People	Merab Omo	Gori Gesha
South West Ethiopia People	Merab Omo	Maji
South West Ethiopia People	Merab Omo	Menit Goldia
South West Ethiopia People	Merab Omo	Menit Shasha
South West Ethiopia People	Merab Omo	Surma
South West Ethiopia People	Sheka	Andracha
South West Ethiopia People	Sheka	Masha
South West Ethiopia People	Sheka	Masha Ketema
South West Ethiopia People	Sheka	Tepi City Admin
South West Ethiopia People	Sheka	Yeki
Tigray	Debub Misrak	Degua Temben
Tigray	Debub Misrak	Enderta
Tigray	Debub Misrak	Hintalo Wajirat
Tigray	Debub Misrak	Seharti Samre
Tigray	Debubawi	Alaje
Tigray	Debubawi	Alamata
Tigray	Debubawi	Alamata Town
Tigray	Debubawi	Endamehoni
Tigray	Debubawi	Korem
Tigray	Debubawi	Maychew
Tigray	Debubawi	Ofla
Tigray	Debubawi	Raya Azebo
Tigray	Mehakelawi	Abbi Addy
Tigray	Mehakelawi	Adwa
Tigray	Mehakelawi	Adwa Town
Tigray	Mehakelawi	Ahiferom
Tigray	Mehakelawi	Axum
Tigray	Mehakelawi	Kola Tembyen
Tigray	Mehakelawi	Laelay Maychew
Tigray	Mehakelawi	Mereb Leke
Tigray	Mehakelawi	Nader Adet
Tigray	Mehakelawi	Tahtaymaychew
Tigray	Mehakelawi	Tanqua Abergele
Tigray	Mehakelawi	Were Lehe
Tigray	Mekele	Adihaki
Tigray	Mekele	Ayder
Tigray	Mekele	Hadnet
Tigray	Mekele	Hawelti
Tigray	Mekele	Kedamay Weyane
Tigray	Mekele	Quiha
Tigray	Mekele	Semen
Tigray	Mirabawi	Kafta Humera
Tigray	Mirabawi	Setit Humera
Tigray	Mirabawi	Tsegede
Tigray	Mirabawi	Welkayit
Tigray	Misrakawi	Adigrat
Tigray	Misrakawi	Atsbi Wenberta
Tigray	Misrakawi	Erob
Tigray	Misrakawi	Ganta Afeshum
Tigray	Misrakawi	Gulo Meheda
Tigray	Misrakawi	Hawuzen
Tigray	Misrakawi	Kilte Awlalo
Tigray	Misrakawi	Saesi Tsadamba
Tigray	Misrakawi	Wukro
Tigray	Semen Mirab	Asegede Tsimbila
Tigray	Semen Mirab	Laelay Adiyabo
Tigray	Semen Mirab	Medebay Zana
Tigray	Semen Mirab	Shiraro
Tigray	Semen Mirab	Shire Enda Silassie
Tigray	Semen Mirab	Tahtay Adiyabo
Tigray	Semen Mirab	Tahtay Qoraro
Tigray	Semen Mirab	Tselemt

== See also ==
- List of cities in East Africa
- List of metropolitan areas in Africa
- Middle East and North Africa
