= Aseko (Aanaa) =

Administrative division of Ethiopia

Coordinates: 8°25′N 40°00′E

Aseko is one of the Aanaas in the Oromia of Ethiopia. It is named after the administrative center of the Aanaa, Aseko. Part of the Arsi Zone, Aseko is bordered on the southwest by Chole, on the northwest by Merti, on the north by the West Hararghe Zone, and on the east by Gololcha.

== Overview ==
The altitude of this woreda ranges from 1000 to 2900 meters above sea level; the highest mountains include Weranbus, Abakoro and Dao. Rivers include the Arba, Dagnam Yelew and Bagdo. A survey of the land in this woreda shows that 19.2% is arable or cultivable, 17.9% pasture, 17.1% forest, and the remaining 45.7% is considered swampy, mountainous or otherwise unusable. Arbagugu State Forest is a local landmark. Coffee, khat, bananas and flax are important cash crops.

Industry in the woreda includes one grain mill and some mining, as well as 83 licensed traders of whom 71% were retailers, 26.5% wholesalers and 2.5% service providers. According to the Government of Oromia, "Aseko is the [most] disadvantaged district in industrial activities in Arsi zone." There were 13 Farmers Associations with 9669 members. Aseko has no reported roads, and is reportedly only accessible during the dry season; due to this inaccessibility, the woreda was largely excluded from rural development programs between 1974 and 1984. However, 27 kilometers of road connecting Abomsa in Merti to Aseko was reported as under construction in 2005. About 19% of the total population has access to drinking water.

== Demographics ==
The 2007 national census reported a total population for this woreda of 84,112, of whom 42,399 were men and 41,713 were women; 3,988 or 4.74% of its population were urban dwellers. The majority of the inhabitants said they were Muslim, with 62.83% of the population reporting they observed this belief, while 36.89% of the population practised Ethiopian Orthodox Christianity.

Based on figures published by the Central Statistical Agency in 2005, this woreda has an estimated total population of 84,959, of whom 41,940 are men and 43,019 are women; 1,961 or 2.31% of its population are urban dwellers, which is less than the Zone average of 12.3%. With an estimated area of 618.13 square kilometers, Aseko has an estimated population density of 137.4 people per square kilometer, which is greater than the Zone average of 132.2.

The 1994 national census reported a total population for this woreda of 61,513, of whom 31,327 were men and 30,186 women; 1,097 or 1.78% of its population were urban dwellers at the time. The two largest ethnic groups reported in Aseko were Oromo (59.49%), and Amhara (40.08%); all other ethnic groups made up 0.43% of the population. Oromiffa was spoken as a first language by 55.62%, and 44.35% spoke Amharic; the remaining 0.03% spoke all other primary languages reported. The majority of the inhabitants were Muslim, with 54.53% of the population having reported they practiced that belief, while 45.38% of the population said they professed Ethiopian Orthodox Christianity.
