= Sude, Ethiopia =

District in Ethiopia

Coordinates: 8°00′N 39°40′E

Sude is one of the woredas in the Oromia Region of Ethiopia. Part of the Arsi Zone, Sude is bordered on the south by Robe, on the southwest by Tena, on the west by Dodotana Sire, on the northwest by Jeju, on the north by Merti, on the northeast by Chole and on the southeast by Amigna. The administrative center of the woreda is Kula.

== Overview ==
The altitude of this woreda ranges from 1800 to 3500 meters above sea level. Rivers include the 40 kilometers of the Magha and 25 of the Goleand Dera. A survey of the land in this woreda shows that 37% is arable or cultivable, 27% pasture, 10% forest, and the remaining 26% is considered swampy, mountainous or otherwise unusable. Niger seed, khat, coffee, cotton and spices are important cash crops.

Industry in the woreda includes 11 grain mills employing 23 people, as well as 220 registered businessmen which includes 75 wholesalers, 116 retailers and 29 service providers. Diksis farm is a medium-sized state-owned farm in this woreda. There were 27 Farmers Associations with 16,165 members and 8 Farmers Service Cooperatives with 12,687 members. Sude has 19 kilometers of dry-weather and no all-weather, for an average road density of 14.6 kilometers per 1000 square kilometers. About 6.8% of the total population has access to drinking water.

== Demographics ==
The 2007 national census reported a total population for this woreda of 147,764, of whom 73,988 were men and 73,776 were women; 2,830 or 1.92% of its population were urban dwellers. The majority of the inhabitants said they were Muslim, with 73.03% of the population reporting they observed this belief, while 25.44% of the population practised Ethiopian Orthodox Christianity.

Based on figures published by the Central Statistical Agency in 2005, this woreda has an estimated total population of 156,762, of whom 78,762 are men and 78,000 are women; 2,648 or 1.69% of its population are urban dwellers, which is less than the Zone average of 12.3%. With an estimated area of 1,297.97 square kilometers, Sude has an estimated population density of 120.8 people per square kilometer, which is less than the Zone average of 132.2.

The 1994 national census reported a total population for this woreda of 113,652, of whom 56,891 were men and 56,761 women; 1,482 or 1.3% of its population were urban dwellers at the time. The two largest ethnic groups reported in Sude were the Oromo (91.22%), and the Amhara (8.5%); all other ethnic groups made up 0.28% of the population. Oromiffa was spoken as a first language by 90.69%, and 9.25% spoke Amharic; the remaining 0.06% spoke all other primary languages reported. The majority of the inhabitants were Muslim, with 72.17% of the population having reported they practiced that belief, while 27.56% of the population said they professed Ethiopian Orthodox Christianity.
