= Merti =

District located in Central Oromia regional state of Ethiopia

Coordinates: 8°20′N 39°50′E

Merti Martii (Oromo)
- District
- Location within Ethiopia
- Country: Ethiopia
- Region: (Oromia Region) Oromia
- Zone: Arsi Zone
- Time zone: UTC+3 (EAT)

Merti is one of the Aanaas in the Oromia Regional State of Ethiopia. Part of the Arsi Zone, Merti is bordered on the south by Sude, on the west by Jeju, on the northwest by the East Shewa Zone, on the north by the Afar Region, on the east by Aseko, and on the southeast by Chole. The administrative center of this woreda is Abomsa; other towns in Merti include Reye. Guna woreda was separated from Merti.

== Overview ==
The altitude of Momina in 1927, which embraces a syncretism of Christian and Muslim beliefs and rituals, is an important local landmark. A lesser one is the Arbagugu state forest. Linseed and teff are important cash crops.

Industry in the woreda includes quarrying and pottery making, 61 small scale industries (including grain mills) that employ 178 people, as well as 727 registered traders 17.6% of whom were wholesalers, 42.4% retailers and 40% service providers. There were 25 Farmers Associations with 14,179 members and 4 Farmers Service Cooperatives with 6958 members. Merti has 148 kilometers of dry-weather and 105 of all-weather road, for an average road density of 197 kilometers per 1000 square kilometers. About 22.7% of the total population has access to drinking water.

== Demographics ==
The 2007 national census reported a total population for this woreda of 90,408, of whom 46,759 were men and 43,649 were women; 14,655 or 16.21% of its population were urban dwellers. The majority of the inhabitants said they were Muslim, with 60.74% of the population reporting they observed this belief, while 37.68% of the population practiced Ethiopian Orthodox Christianity, and 1.37% of the population were Protestant.

Based on figures published by the Central Statistical Agency in 2005, this woreda has an estimated total population of 135,023, of whom 67,257 are men and 67,766 are women; 26,053 or 19.30% of its population are urban dwellers, which is greater than the Zone average of 12.3%. With an estimated area of 1,282.19 square kilometers, Merti has an estimated population density of 105.3 people per square kilometer, which is less than the Zone average of 132.2.

The 1994 national census reported a total population for this woreda of 93,895, of whom 47,201 were men and 46,694 women; 14,575 or 15.52% of its population were urban dwellers at the time. The two largest ethnic groups reported in Merti were the Oromo (71.29%), and the Amhara (26.3%); all other ethnic groups made up 2.41% of the population. Oromiffa was spoken as a first language by 65.38%, and 33.79% spoke Amharic; the remaining 0.83% spoke all other primary languages reported. The majority of the inhabitants were Muslim, with 59.71% of the population having reported they practiced that belief, while 39.91% of the population said they professed Ethiopian Orthodox Christianity.

== Notable people ==
- Surafel Dagnachew (born 1997), footballer
