= Seka, Ethiopia =

Town in Ethiopia

Seka is a town located in the Oromia Region in southeastern Ethiopia.

== Transport ==
It is planned that this town will receive a railway station on the new Ethiopian Railway system.

== See also ==
- List of cities and towns in Ethiopia
