= Chole (woreda) =

Administrative division of Ethiopia

Coordinates: 8°10′N 39°50′E

Chole is one of the woredas in the Oromia Region of Ethiopia. Part of the Arsi Zone, Chole is bordered on the south by Amigna, on the southwest by Sude, on the northwest by Merti, on the north by Aseko, and on the east by Gololcha. Towns in Chole include Chole and Moye.

== Overview ==
The highest point in this woreda is Mount Gugu (3626 meters).

Construction on the 99 kilometer road between Chole and Dera was completed and opened for traffic 15 August 2009, at a cost of over 146 million Birr. The Ethiopian Roads Authority reported that the new road would reduce the distance between the two towns by half. Coffee is an important cash crop of this woreda. Between 2,000 and 5,000 hectares are planted with this crop.

== Demographics ==
The 2007 national census reported a total population for this woreda of 89,291, of whom 45,018 were men and 44,273 were women; 6,747 or 7.56% of its population were urban dwellers. The majority of the inhabitants said they were Muslim, with 49.42% of the population reporting they observed this belief, while 46.51% of the population practised Ethiopian Orthodox Christianity, and 1.78% of the population were Protestant.

Based on figures published by the Central Statistical Agency in 2005, this woreda has an estimated total population of 111,831, of whom 56,029 are men and 55,802 are women; 7,557 or 6.76% of its population are urban dwellers, which is less than the Zone average of 12.3%. With an estimated area of 765.94 square kilometers, Chole has an estimated population density of 146 people per square kilometer, which is greater than the Zone average of 132.2.

The 1994 national census reported a total population for this woreda of 80,131, of whom 40,197 were men and 39,934 women; 4,233 or 5.28% of its population were urban dwellers at the time. The two largest ethnic groups reported in Chole were Oromo (63.91%), and Amhara (35.69%); all other ethnic groups made up 0.4% of the population. Oromiffa was spoken as a first language by 58.21%, and 41.1% spoke Amharic; the remaining 0.69% spoke all other primary languages reported. The majority of the inhabitants professed Ethiopian Orthodox Christianity, with 50.85% of the population having reported they practiced that belief, while 48.03% of the population said they were Muslim.
