= Aminya =

Administrative division in Ethiopia

Coordinates: 7°50′N 40°00′E

Aminya is one of the Aanaas in the Oromia Region of Ethiopia. Part of the Arsi Zone, Amigna is bordered on the south by Seru, on the southwest by Robe, on the west by Sude, on the northwest by Chole, on the north by Gololcha, and on the east by the West Hararghe Zone. Towns include Adele.

== Demographics ==
The 2007 national census reported a total population for this woreda of 73,245, of whom 36,618 were men and 36,627 were women; 6,425 or 8.77% of its population were urban dwellers. The majority of the inhabitants said they were Muslim, with 58.91% of the population reporting they observed this belief, while 40.54% of the population practised Ethiopian Orthodox Christianity.

Based on figures published by the Central Statistical Agency in 2005, this woreda has an estimated total population of 76,061, of whom 37,890 are men and 38,171 are women; 6,429 or 8.45% of its population are urban dwellers, which is less than the Zone average of 12.3%. With an estimated area of 1,345.32 square kilometers, Amigna has an estimated population density of 56.5 people per square kilometer, which is less than the Zone average of 132.2.

=== 1994 national census ===
The 1994 national census reported a total population for this woreda of 54,280, of whom 27,354 were men and 26,926 women; 3,596 or 6.62% of its population were urban dwellers at the time. The two largest ethnic groups reported in Amigna were Oromo (89.95%), and Amhara (9.24%); all other ethnic groups made up 0.81% of the population. Oromo was spoken as a first language by 89.52%, and 10.24% spoke Amharic; the remaining 0.24% spoke all other primary languages reported. The majority of the inhabitants were Muslim, with 55.63% of the population having reported they practiced that belief, while 44.01% of the population said they professed Ethiopian Orthodox Christianity.
