= Jeju (woreda) =

District in Oromia Region, Ethiopia

Coordinates: 8°20′N 39°10′E

Jeju is a woreda in Oromia Region, Ethiopia. Part of the Arsi Zone, Jeju is bordered by Dodotana Sire to the west, the Misraq Shewa Zone to the north, Merti to the east, and Sude to the south. Its administrative centre is Arboye, located 168 kilometres southeast of Addis Ababa. Other towns in this woreda include Bolo.

== Overview ==
The altitude of this woreda ranges from 1100 to 2700 metres above sea level. Rivers within the woreda include the Awash (50 km), Washaba (20 km) and the Wereso (30 km). Forest, shrubland and savanna are the types of vegetation found in the district. The native wildlife includes the monkey, the ape, the wild pig, the fox, the antelope and the rabbit

Cereals, pulses and oil seeds are widely grown. Wheat and barley are major cereal crops produced in Jeju in both the belg and meher seasons. Industry in the woreda includes 34 grain mills and one edible oil mill which employs about 87 people; quarrying and pottery are other industrial crafts practiced in Jeju. Jeju has 24 kilometers of dry weather road, or an average road density of 29.8 kilometers per 1000 square kilometers, which is below the Zone average of 45.0. About 22.7% of the total population has access to drinking water.

== Demographics ==
The 2007 national census reported a total population for this woreda of 124,093, of whom 63,133 were men and 60,960 were women; 6,681 or 5.38% of its population were urban dwellers. The majority of the inhabitants said they were Muslim, with 74.53% of the population reporting they observed this belief, while 23.97% of the population practised Ethiopian Orthodox Christianity.

Based on the figures from the Central Statistical Agency (Ethiopia) published in 2005, Jeju woreda has an estimated population of 124,211 of whom 62,785 are men and 61,426 women; 9377 or 7.5% of its population are urban dwellers, which is less than the Zone average of 12.3%. With an estimated area of 803.91 square kilometers, Jeju has a population density of 154.5 people per square kilometre which is greater than the Zone average of 132.2. It is the second smallest district in area in the Arsi Zone.

The 1994 national census reported a total population for this woreda of 88,833, of whom 45,096 were men and 43,736 women; 5,243 or 5.9% of its population were urban dwellers at the time. The two largest ethnic groups reported in Jeju were Oromo (81.58%), and Amhara (17.01%); all other ethnic groups made up 1.41% of the population. Oromiffa was spoken as a first language by 78.7%, and 20.75% spoke Amharic; the remaining 0.55% spoke all other primary languages reported. The majority of the inhabitants were Muslim, with 74.06% of the population having reported they practiced that belief, while 25.54% of the population said they professed Ethiopian Orthodox Christianity.
