= Raaso =

Raaso ራሶ (Amharic) Raaso (Somali)
- City
- Location within Ethiopia
- Coordinates: 6°32′N 41°47′E
- Country: Ethiopia
- Region: Somali
- Zone: Bali zone
- District: Raaso Woreda
- Elevation: 1,600 m (5,200 ft)

Population
  - Total: 950,000
- estimated
- Time zone: UTC+3 (EAT)

Raaso is a city in the Somali Region of Ethiopia. Situated in the Baali Zone, it is the most populated city in the region.

Raaso is a city in the Somali Region of Ethiopia, located in the Baale zone. It is one of the notable towns in the region. . The district area is estimated at approximately 1950 square kilometres. The district is inhabited by the Sheekhaal/fiqicumar community, pecifically the Aw Qutub clan son's Abaadir omer Al-Rida. Raaso lies along the Imi–Ginir road, approximately 40 kilometers north-west of West Imi (Mirab Imi).

The other towns around Raaso district are Buundada which is located on Shabeelle River, Dhaley and others. The area is characterised by thick, hilly bushland with seasonal rivers nearby that may carry water after rains, and where it is easy to dig shallow wells to get water available throughout the year.

== The background of the district ==
On March 15, 2011, the president of the Somali Regional State, Abdi Mohamud Omar asked the regional parliament to approve the densely populated Raaso region and 14 other towns as new districts. The ogaden Adan khayr cabdulle was outraged as the Raaso region which hosts almost a million residents was subjugated to district level of Afdheer.

This declaration was in no doubt driven by the desire to torpedo, the "Liyuu administrative status" sought by the people of the region. We are deeply disappointed with the president. The definition of the country's constitution and given the number of its inhabitants, the Raaso region can't be anything less than 8 districts and hence, a full province. We believe the president understands this but is unwilling to do the right thing secondary to tribal politics in the Somali Regional State. But, one may ask, how long will the region's leadership continue putting tribal politics before sound policies that in short term might be difficult, but in the long run, will benefit the Somali Regional State?

The Raaso region can't be a district constitutionally, administratively, the Raaso region should be made the 10th Province of the Somali Regional State. We recommend the Raaso province to include Salaxaad, Lagahida and West Imay districts. The province should consist of the following districts: Raaso, Dhaley, Buundada, Ceel Afweyn, West Imay, Salaxaad and Lagahida. We believe, this is practical geographically.

Federal Affairs Minister
