= Aseko =

- Location within Ethiopia
- Coordinates: 8°31′N 40°02′E
- Country: Ethiopia
- Region: Oromia
- Zone: Arsi Zone

Population (2005)
  - Total: 1,961
- Time zone: UTC+3 (EAT)

Aseko is a town in central Ethiopia. Located in the Arsi Zone of the Oromia Region, this town has a latitude and longitude of 08°31′N 40°02′E. It is the administrative center of Aseko woreda.

According to the Oromia Regional government, this town currently has no telephone service, as well as no electricity.

Based on figures from the Central Statistical Agency in 2005, Aseko has an estimated total population of 1,961 of whom 968 were males and 993 were females. The 1994 national census reported this town had a total population of 1,097 of whom 525 were males and 572 were females.
