= Guna (woreda) =

District in Oromia Region, Ethiopia

Guna is one of the woredas in the Oromia Region of Ethiopia. It is part of the Arsi Zone. It was separated from the Merti woreda.

== Demographics ==
The 2007 national census reported a total population for this woreda of 76,365, of whom 38,481 were men and 37,884 were women; 5,558 or 7.28% of its population were urban dwellers. The majority of the inhabitants, 59.89%, said they were Muslim while 39.99% of the population practised Ethiopian Orthodox Christianity.
