= Kula, Ethiopia =

Kula is a town in southeastern Ethiopia. Located in the Arsi Zone of the Oromia Region, it has a latitude and longitude of 07°58′N 39°42′E with an elevation of 2842 meters above sea level. The town is the administrative center of Sude woreda; according to materials on the Nordic Africa Institute website, it had been the administrative center at least as early as the 1980s.

According to the Oromia Regional government, this town currently has wired & wireless telephone service, 24 hours electricity, one community FM station. A veterinary clinic is reportedly under construction.

Based on figures from the Central Statistical Agency in 2005, Kula has an estimated total population of 2,648 of whom 1,278 were males and 1,370 were females.
