= Baali =

Baali may refer to:

- Baali language, a Bantu language of the Democratic Republic of the Congo
- Baali people, a group in the Democratic Republic of the Congo, in a patron-vassal relationship with the Kango people

== See also ==
- Baal (disambiguation)
- Bali (disambiguation)
