= Arboye =

- Location within Ethiopia
- Coordinates: 8°36′N 40°13′E
- Country: Ethiopia
- Region: Oromia
- Zone: Arsi
- Elevation: 1,636 m (5,367 ft)

Population (2005)
  - Total: 8,220
- Time zone: UTC+3 (EAT)
- Climate: Cwb

Arboye is a town in eastern Ethiopia and the administrative centre of the Jeju woreda. Located in the Arsi Zone of the Oromia Region, 168 kilometers southeast of Addis Ababa on the road between Adama and Dire Dawa, this town has a latitude and longitude of 8°36′N 40°13′E.

== Overview ==
According to the Oromia Regional government, this town currently has no telephone or postal service, but is supplied with electricity from a diesel generator. Records at the Nordic Africa Institute website provide details of a primary school in Arboye in 1968.

Based on figures from the Central Statistical Agency (Ethiopia), Arboye had an estimated total population of 8,220 of whom 4119 are men and 4101 women. The 1994 national census reported this town had a total population of 4,596 of whom 2,234 were men and 2,362 were women. It is the larger of two towns in Jeju woreda.
