= Rema, Ethiopia =

- Location in Ethiopia
- Coordinates: 10°16′34″N 38°55′4″E
- Country: Ethiopia
- Region: Amhara Region
- Zone: Semien Shewa Zone
- Elevation: 2,000 m (6,600 ft)

Population (2011)
  - Total: 7,000 (est)
- Time zone: UTC+3 (EAT)

Rema is a village in the Amhara Region of Ethiopia, 220 km North of Addis Ababa.

The special feature of the village is that almost only solar panels are used for electricity generation.

In 2005 there was a plan to provide a diesel generator for the generation of electricity for the houses, schools, small businesses and a health clinic. The residents refused to accept the gift because the generator is used only a limited amount of time per day because they cannot afford the ever-increasing costs of diesel. In addition, the residents had seen the use of solar panels in the neighboring hamlet Kechemober. These were installed in 29 households and a school thanks to a pilot project of a German foundation.

The people of Rema also wanted solar panels. After a thorough training of a number of local residents for the assembly, installation, and maintenance of solar panels, 1100 units were installed in 2007. Microfinance allowed the residents to pay the costs. In the year 2011, 2200 units were installed. Except for lighting with LED lamps for street lighting, in homes and schools - especially for evening adult education - solar energy is used for water pumps, disinfection of water, fridges and TVs. Because no kerosene is used anymore for lighting, the number of complaints as a result of smoke (lung problems) is reduced.

The peculiarity of the use of solar energy in this way led to a visit of Bill Clinton and his daughter Chelsea Clinton to the village in 2008.
