= Debre Selam =

Town in Oromia Region, Ethiopia

Chancho Caancoo
- Town
- Location within Ethiopia
- Coordinates: 8°15′N 40°08′E
- Country: Ethiopia
- Region: Oromia
- Zone: Arsi
- Elevation: 1,451 m (4,760 ft)

Population (2005)
  - Total: 1,465
- Time zone: UTC+3 (EAT)

Chancho (also known as Debre Selam) is a town in central Ethiopia. Located in the Arsi Zone of the Oromia Region, this town has a latitude and longitude of 08°15′N 40°08′E with an elevation of 1451 meters above sea level. It is the administrative center of Gololcha woreda.

According to the Oromia Regional government, this town currently lacks electricity, telephone and postal service.

Based on figures from the Central Statistical Agency in 2005, Debre Selam has an estimated total population of 1,465 of whom 739 were males and 726 were females. The 1994 national census reported this town had a total population of 819 of whom 401 were males and 416 were females.
