= Aweday =

Town located in Oromia state of Ethiopia

Coordinates: 9°22′N 42°03′E

Awaday Awwadaay (Oromo)
- Town
- Location within Ethiopia
- Country: Ethiopia
- Region: Oromia
- Zone: East Hararghe
- Time zone: East Africa Time

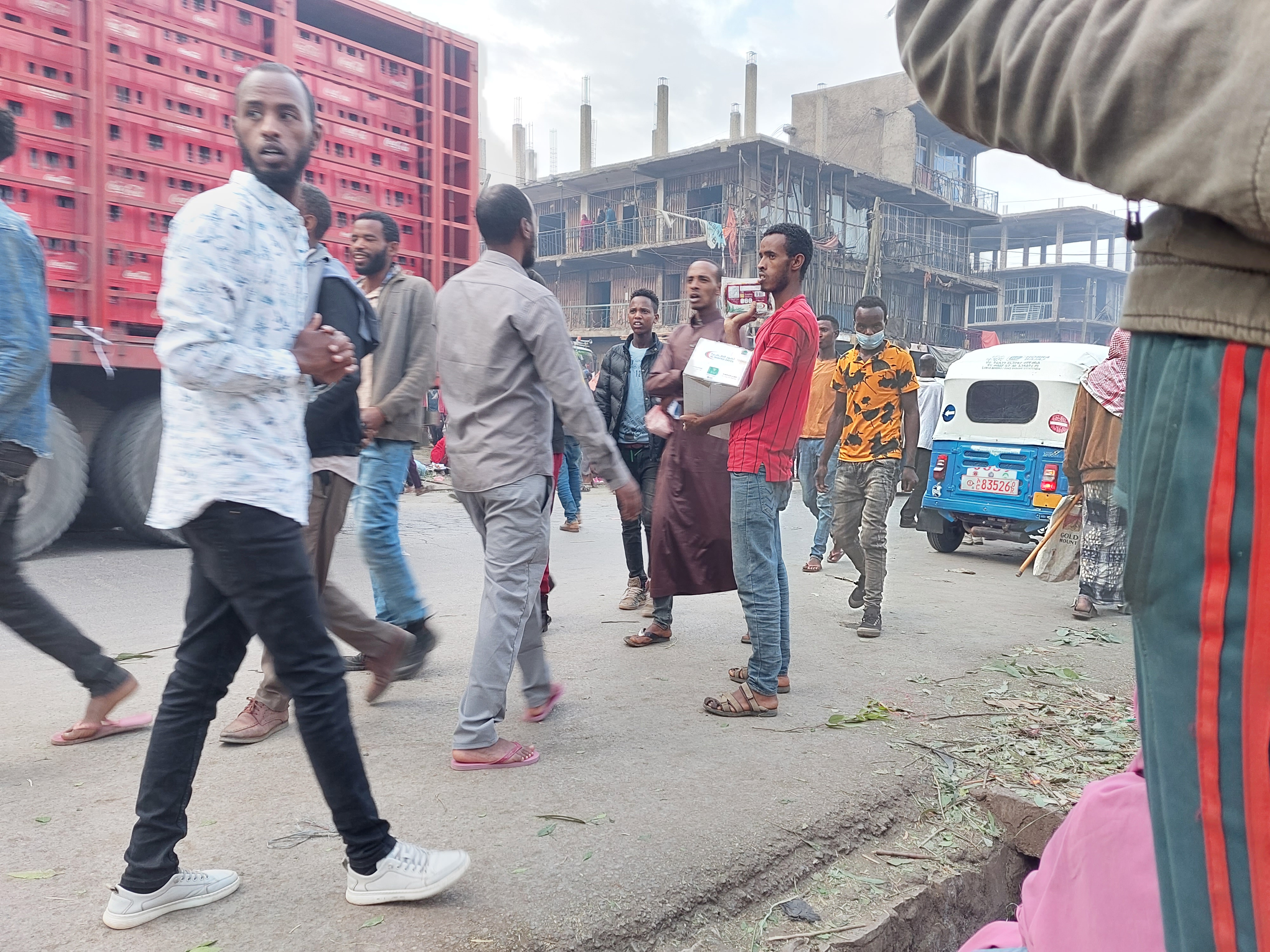
Aweday market

Awaday (Oromo: Awwadaay) is a town located in the East Hararghe Zone of the Oromia, Ethiopia. Awaday is the world's biggest market and exporter of the amphetamine-like leaf khat, a stimulant known as Jimaa locally. Khat is the main cash crop traded 24 hours a day in the town. People used khat to increase awareness and lower fatigue while yielding euphoria.

Awaday is an international hub for khat, from where it is exported to Somalia, Djibouti and the Arabian Peninsula, London, Amsterdam every night. Khat was Ethiopia's fourth largest export, yielding in more than 200 million euros 2013.
