= Tebela =

City in Wolaita, Ethiopia

Tebela: Xabala (Wolaytta); ጠበላ (Amharic)
- City
- Tebela within Wolayita Tebela within Ethiopia
- Coordinates: 6°42′24″N 37°46′10″E
- Country: Ethiopia
- Region: South Ethiopia Regional State
- Zone: Wolaita
- District: Humbo

Government
  - Mayor: Markos Meskele (Prosperity Party)
- Elevation: 1,600 m (5,200 ft)

Population (2023)
  - Total: 17,538
  - Male: 8,849
  - Female: 8,689
- Time zone: UTC+3 (East Africa Time)
- Geocode: S -30

Tebela (Geʽez: ጠበላ) or (Wolayttattuwa: Xabala) is a city in Wolaita Zone South Ethiopia Regional State. Tebela is an administrative capital of Humbo district of Wolayita Zone. Tebela is located about 345 km away from Addis Ababa to the south. And also, Tebela is located 20 km, South from Sodo, the capital of the region and also Wolayita Zone. The coordinate point of the city in map is 6°42′24″N 37°46′10″E. The amenities in the city are; 24 hours electricity, pure public water, banks, primary and secondary schools, postal service, telecommunications services health centre, private clinics, drugs store, public market, public road light around high ways, internal and town crossing asphalt roads and others.

== Demographics ==
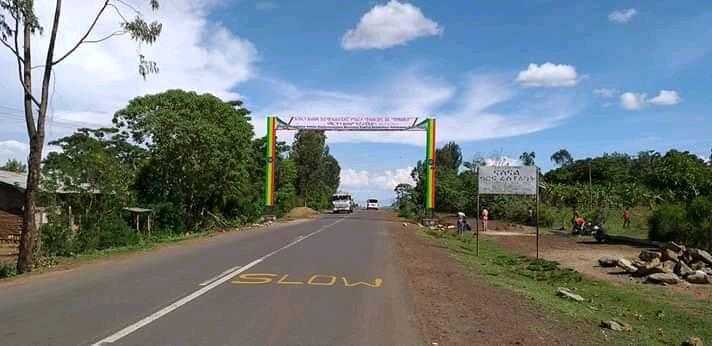
Tebela entrance from Sodo

Tebela is one of densely populated areas in South Ethiopia Regional State. Total population of the city as conducted by central statistical agency of Ethiopia in 2020 is 17,538. From this figure female population counts 8,689 and male population counts 8,849.
