= Gololcha =

District in Oromia, Ethiopia

Coordinates: 8°15′N 40°10′E

Gololcha Gololchaa (Oromo)
- District
- Location within Ethiopia
- Country: Ethiopia
- Region: (Oromia Region) Oromia
- Zone: Arsi Zone
- Time zone: UTC+3 (EAT)

Gololcha is one of the Aanaas in Oromia Regional State of Ethiopia. Part of the Arsi Zone, Gololcha is bordered on the south by Aminya, on the west by Chole, on the northwest by Aseko, and on the north and east by the West Hararghe Zone. The administrative center of this woreda is Chancho; other towns include Tumuga, Jinga Dibo, Haro Akiya, and Mine.

== Overview ==
The altitude of this woreda rarely exceeds 1500 meters above sea level. Rivers include 50 kilometers of the Gololcha, 26 of the Mine and 37 of the Daraba. A survey of the land in this woreda shows that 20.6% is arable or cultivable, 21.7% pasture, 27% forest, and the remaining 30.7% is considered swampy, mountainous or otherwise unusable. Khat and fruits are important cash crops. Coffee is another important cash crop; over 50 square kilometers are planted in it. On 26 July 2009, the woreda agriculture and rural development office reported over five million quintals of coffee were harvested in the previous fiscal year.

Industry in the woreda includes quarrying and pottery works, 4 grain mills employing 10 people, as well as 195 registered businesses of whom 18.5% were wholesalers 65.6% retailers and 15.9% service providers. There were 35 Farmers Associations with 13,061 members, but no Farmers Service Cooperatives. Gololcha has 113 kilometers of dry-weather and no all-weather roads, for an average of road density of 65.7 kilometers per 1000 square kilometers. It is one of two woredas in this Zone where the population has no access to drinking water.

== Demographics ==
The 2007 national census reported a total population for this woreda of 172,176, of whom 87,785 were men and 84,391 were women; 3,472 or 2.02% of its population were urban dwellers. The majority of the inhabitants said they were Muslim, with 78.36% of the population reporting they observed this belief, while 20.23% of the population practised Ethiopian Orthodox Christianity.

Based on figures published by the Central Statistical Agency in 2005, this woreda has an estimated total population of 162,892, of whom 80,532 are men and 82,360 are women; 4,384 or 2.69% of its population are urban dwellers, which is less than the Zone average of 12.3%. With an estimated area of 1,719.38 square kilometers, Gololcha has an estimated population density of 94.7 people per square kilometer, which is less than the Zone average of 132.2.

The 1994 national census reported a total population for this woreda of 117,828, of whom 59,895 were men and 57,933 women; 2,449 or 2.08% of its population were urban dwellers at the time. The two largest ethnic groups reported in Gololcha were Oromo (82.13%), and Amhara (17.13%); all other ethnic groups made up 0.74% of the population. Oromiffa was spoken as a first language by 78.01%, and 21.94% spoke Amharic; the remaining 0.05% spoke all other primary languages reported. The majority of the inhabitants were Muslim, with 77.23% of the population having reported they practiced that belief, while 21.53% of the population said they professed Ethiopian Orthodox Christianity, and 1.19% were Roman Catholic.
