= Abomsa =

- Location within Ethiopia
- Coordinates: 8°35′N 39°51′E
- Country: Ethiopia
- Region: Oromia
- Zone: Arsi Zone
- Elevation: 1,438 m (4,718 ft)

Population (2005)
  - Total: 19,208
- Time zone: UTC+3 (EAT)
- Climate: Aw

Abomsa is a town in central Ethiopia; Located in the Arsi Zone of the Oromia Region, the town has a latitude and longitude of 8°35′N 39°51′E and an altitude of 1438 meters. It is the administrative center of Merti woreda. Prior to 1995, it was the capital of Arba Gugu awrajja.

According to the Oromia Regional government, this town currently has telephone and postal service, and is provided with electricity on a 24-hour-a-day basis.

Emperor Haile Selassie visited the veterans' resettlement project near the town on 31 December 1956, which had at the time 8,000 acres (32 km^{2}) under cultivation. During his visit the Emperor announced that a school would be built at Abomsa.

== Demographics ==
Based on 2005 figures from the Central Statistical Agency, Abomsa has an estimated total population of 19,208 of whom 9,548 were men and 9,660 were women. The 1994 national census reported this town had a total population of 10,742 of whom 5,178 were men and 5,564 were women.
