= Jewish Neo-Aramaic =

Jewish Neo-Aramaic can refer to several related Neo-Aramaic languages and dialects:

- Inter-Zab Jewish Neo-Aramaic
- Jewish Neo-Aramaic dialect of Barzani
- Jewish Neo-Aramaic dialect of Betanure
- Jewish Neo-Aramaic dialect of Challa
- Jewish Neo-Aramaic dialect of Koy Sanjaq
- Jewish Neo-Aramaic dialect of Urmia
- Jewish Neo-Aramaic dialect of Zakho
- Sanandaj Jewish Neo-Aramaic
- Trans-Zab Jewish Neo-Aramaic

== See also ==
- Jewish Palestinian Aramaic
- Judeo-Aramaic languages
- List of Jewish diaspora languages
