= Soreth =

Soreth is the name given to a number of modern Syriac languages:

- Chaldean Neo-Aramaic
- Hertevin language
- Bohtan Neo-Aramaic.
- The spelling Suret is usually used in Assyrian Neo-Aramaic.
- The spelling Surat is usually used in Koy Sanjaq Surat.
