= Christian Neo-Aramaic dialect of Urmia =

Dialect of Neo-Aramaic, spoken in Iran

Urmia Neo-Aramaic
- Native to: northwestern Iran
- Region: Urmia
- Language family: Afro-Asiatic: Semitic; Central Semitic; Northwest Semitic; Aramaic; Eastern Aramaic; Northeastern; Urmia Neo-Aramaic

Language codes
- ISO 639-3: –

Christian Urmi (C. Urmi) is the dialect of Northeastern Neo-Aramaic spoken by Assyrian Christians in Urmia, northwestern Iran.

== Overview ==
Aramaic-speaking Assyrian Christians in Urmi and its surrounding areas can be dated via textual references to at least to the 12th century, but it is unclear how long these speakers had been in Urmi prior to those dates. Linguistic evidence indicates that it is likely that the ancestor of C. Urmi migrated to its current location from the mountains of eastern Turkey, and loans also indicate that at some point in its history, C. Urmi was in contact with Arabic in northern Mesopotamia.

The demographic details of Urmin speakers has changed in the recent history of the language thanks to a variety of historical factors. Prior to the twentieth century, the vast majority of speakers resided not within the town of Urmi, but rather overwhelmingly inhabited rural areas around the town and lived agricultural lifestyles. The political upheavals and ethnic conflict that occurred during the First World War caused widespread movement; on the one hand, numerous Assyrians followed the retreating Russian army and settled in the Caucasus regions, where some C. Urmi-speaking communities had already been established following the Treaty of Turkmenchay. On the other hand, Assyrians who did not leave the region altogether ended up re-settling not in their former rural homes but rather within Urmi itself, and also established communities in other Iranian cities such as Tabriz, Hamadan and Tehran. The movement into Urmi increased in following decades as Assyrians moved to the town for economic and other reasons. By 2010, the number of Assyrians in the area, almost entirely within Urmi itself, had been reduced to only about 5,000, compared to an estimate of 78,000 in 1914.

The post-Great War immigration of C. Urmi-speakers to the Soviet Union resulted in several established communities, one of the largest of which is found near Armavir in a town dubbed Urmiya. The retention rate of Urmi among these Assyrians was around 67 percent at least until 1970. In addition to these communities in the North Caucasus, the existence of Urmi-speaking Assyrians in Georgia can be dated even earlier to the 18th century. In addition to communities in Tbilisi and several other towns, the largest and oldest of these communities is in the town of Dzveli Canda in Mtskheta District, and the current overall population of Assyrians in Georgia is roughly 6,000. Prior to a 1937 repression under Stalin's regime, Urmi activity in Georgia was even more vibrant, seeing the establishment of theater group and a literary journal (Koxvə d mədinxə "Star of the East") in Tbilisi. Still today, some schools in Canda and Tbilisi teach the literary form of C. Urmi.

Following the Treaty of Turkmenchay, Urmi communities were also established in Yerevan province in Armenia. A 1979 census recorded just over 6,000 Assyrians in Armenia, and some villages apparently retained knowledge of, or at least learned, C. Urmi. Following the 1991 independence of Armenia, there has been a major exodus of Assyrians from the country.

The aforementioned upheavals of the 20th century also saw immigration of C. Urmi speakers to North America, Europe, and Australia. Two especially large communities have been established in Chicago and Turlock, in the San Joaquin Valley of California, which today hosts a population of around 15,000 Assyrians primarily of Urmi extraction. These communities still retain knowledge of C. Urmi to varying degrees, especially among older speakers.

== Phonology ==
Consonants
| | | Labial | Dental/ Alveolar | Palato- alveolar | Palatal | Post-velar | Laryngeal |
|---|---|---|---|---|---|---|---|
| Nasal | | m | n | | | | |
| Stops | unvoiced lax | p | t | tʃ | c | | ʔ |
| Stops | unvoiced tense | p͈ | t͈ | t͈ʃ | c͈ | k͈ | |
| Stops | voiced | b | d | dʒ | ɟ | | |
| Fricatives | unvoiced | f | s | ʃ | | x | h |
| Fricatives | voiced | v | z | ʒ | | ɣ | |
| Lateral | | | l | | | | |
| Rhotic | | | r | | | | |
| Approximant | | | | | j | | |

Notes:

- The lax stops are aspirated; the tense ones are unaspirated, but pronounced with tense vocal folds and can therefore be described as glottalized. In all Urmi dialects tense /k͈/ is sometimes pronounced as an ejective [kʼ], and in varieties spoken in Georgia, other tense consonants are also sometimes pronounced as ejectives.
- Lax /t/ is laminal alveolar while tense /t͈/ is apical alveolar.
- /d/ is pronounced laminal in plain contexts but apical in emphatic words.
- The distinction between tense and lax is neutralized after a fricative. Aspiration is also not always pronounced at the end of words.
- North of Urmi, in the Tabriz dialect, and in most parts of the Caucasus, the affricates are realized as palato-alveolar, i.e. [tʃʰ]. South of Urmi the offset is most commonly [s] or [z] if voiced, but in free variation with a palato-alveolar offset.
- In many northern dialects, /c/ and /c͈/ are pronounced as palato-alveolar affricates, often merging with /tʃ/ etc., but there is considerable variation.
- /h/ is pronounced [ɦ] intervocalically.
- Not shown above is the phonemic "suprasegmental emphasis," or word-level pharyngealization. This suprasegmental phoneme is primarily characterized by pharyngealization but also involves retracting the tongue from the primary point of articulation in dorsal and coronal consonants, as well as a degree of lip-rounding and retraction of vowels. While emphatic spreading of the emphatic series of consonants in other Semitic languages is frequent, C. Urmi is best analyzed synchronically as having truly word-level emphasis. Following Khan and others, this is transcribed phonemically with a prefixed ^{+}, for example in the minimal pair /ʔarja/ [ʔærjæ] "lion" vs. /^{+}ʔarja/ [ʔɑrˤjɑ], "saint's festival."

== Grammar ==
=== Nouns ===
==== Gender ====
Most masculine nouns have the singular ending -a, while most feminine nouns have the singular ending -ta which both come from the determined state inflection of earlier Aramaic.

Certain nouns ending in -a are feminine, such as some words for body parts, places, names of countries, small animals.

In addition to forming feminine forms of masculine nouns, the suffixes -ta and -ita serves additional functions such as expressing singularity for plural nouns, or forming diminutives.

==== Plurals ====
The plural or most nouns is formed by replacing the singular inflections -a and -ta with a plural inflection with the most common ending being -ə. Other plural endings include -atə which is mainly used for feminine nouns ending in -a, -yatə which is the most common plural ending for feminine nouns ending in -ta, -vatə and -avatə which are typically added to inanimate nouns and kinship terms.

=== Pronouns ===
Independent personal pronouns
| | singular | plural |
|---|---|---|
| 1st | ʾána | ʾáxnan |
| 2nd | ʾát, ʾátən | ʾáxtun, ʾaxtóxun, ʾaxnóxun |
| 3rd (masculine) | ^{+}av, ^{+}ávun | ʾáni |
| 3rd (feminine) | ʾay, ʾayən | ʾáni |

==== Demonstrative pronouns ====
The demonstrative pronouns of C. Urmi can be classified into four series of deixis (near, medium, far, default) with each series having a nominative form, and an oblique form which is marked with the prefix d- that comes from the Aramaic genitive particle.

Independent near deixis pronouns
| | nominative | oblique |
|---|---|---|
| singular | ʾáha, ʾa- | dáha, da- |
| plural | ʾánnə | dánnə |

Independent medium deixis pronouns
| | nominative | oblique |
|---|---|---|
| masculine singular | ^{+}ʾávva | dáha |
| feminine singular | ʾáyya | dáyya |
| plural | ʾánnə | dánnə |

Independent far deixis pronouns
| | nominative | oblique |
|---|---|---|
| masculine singular | ^{+}ʾavvó, ^{+}ʾavvóha, ^{+}ʾavvóxa | ^{+}davvó, ^{+}davvóha, ^{+}davvóxa |
| feminine singular | ʾayyé, ʾayyéha, ʾayyéxa | dayyé, dayyéha, dayyéxa |
| plural | ʾanní, ʾanné, ʾanníhi | danní, danné, danníhi |

Independent default demonstrative pronouns
| | nominative | oblique |
|---|---|---|
| masculine singular | ^{+}ʾáv, ^{+}ʾávun | ^{+}dáv, ^{+}dávun |
| feminine singular | ^{+}ʾáy, ^{+}ʾáyǝn | ^{+}dáy, ^{+}dáyǝn |
| plural | ʾáni | dáni |

Attributive default demonstrative pronouns
| | nominative | oblique |
|---|---|---|
| masculine singular | ʾo | do |
| feminine singular | ʾe | de |
| plural | ʾan (Urmia), ʾēn (Northern Urmia, Caucasus) | dan (Urmia), dēn (Northern Urmia, Caucasus) |

==== Pronominal suffixes ====
The pronominal genitive suffixes attach to nouns and prepositions If a noun ends in -ə, the ending is replaced by the suffix, and if a noun ends in -i, the -i is generally retained with yy inserted before the suffix.

Independent personal pronouns
| | suffix | | with the noun bet | |
| | singular | plural | singular | plural |
|---|---|---|---|---|
| 1st | -i | -an, eni | béti | bétan, beténi |
| 2nd (masculine) | -ux | -oxun | bétux | betóxun |
| 2nd (feminine) | -ax | -oxun | bétax | betóxun |
| 3rd (masculine) | -u | -é | bétu | beté |
| 3rd (feminine) | -o | -é | béto | beté |

=== Adjectives ===
Adjectives inflect for gender and number. However, a few adjectives are invariable such as raxk̭a 'distant', k̭urba 'near', ʾamk̭u 'deep', and ^{+}mač̭č̭u 'smooth'.

=== Copula ===
The copula is usually placed after the predicate. It can stand independently, but in most cases, it is attached to the preceding predicate as a clitic, where it usually assimilates if the predicate end in a vowel with the exception to a few monosyllabic words. The copula is negated by adding the la in front which usually contracts to le with the copula.

Present copula
| | singular | plural |
|---|---|---|
| 1st (masculine) | ʾívǝn | ʾívax |
| 1st (feminine) | ʾívan | ʾívax |
| 2nd (masculine) | ʾívǝt | ʾítun |
| 2nd (feminine) | ʾívat | ʾítun |
| 3rd (masculine) | ʾílǝ | ʾína |
| 3rd (feminine) | ʾíla | ʾína |

The past copula is formed by attaching the suffix va to the /i/ part of the present copula.

Past copula
| | singular | plural |
|---|---|---|
| 1st | ʾī́nva | ʾī́xva |
| 2nd | ʾī́tva | ʾítunva |
| 3rd | ʾíva | |

==== Deictic copulas ====
The near deictic copula is formed by combining the present copula clitic with the prefix du-. The far deictic copula is formed by adding the prefix ve-, and is typically only used in the 3rd person.

=== Verbs ===
Verbal inflections are formed by mapping abstract verbal roots onto non-concatenative morphological templates of three and sometimes four radicals.

Verbal patterns
| | Pattern I p-t-x ‘to open’ | Pattern II b-s-m ‘to heal’ | Pattern III m-dm-x ‘to cause to sleep’ | Quadriliteral I ɟ-rɟ-š ‘to drag’ | Quadriliteral II mɟ-rɟ-š ‘to be dragged’ |
|---|---|---|---|---|---|
| Present | patəx- | basəm- | madməx- | ɟarɟəš- | mɟarɟəš- |
| Past | ptix- | busəm- | mudməx- | ɟurɟəš- | mɟurɟəš- |
| Resultative participle | ptixa | busma | mudməx | ɟurɟəš | mɟurɟəšša |
| Imperative | ptux | basəm | madməx | ɟarɟəš | mɟarɟəš |
| Infinitive | ptaxa | basumə (marginal: basuma) | madmuxə (marginal: madmuxa) | ɟarɟušə (marginal: ɟarɟuša) | mɟarɟušə (marginal: mɟarɟuša) |
| Progressive | bəptaxa | basumə (marginal: basuma) | madmuxə (marginal: madmuxa) | ɟarɟušə (marginal: ɟarɟuša) | mɟarɟušə (marginal: mɟarɟuša) |
| Verbal noun | ptaxta | basamta | madmaxta | ɟarɟašta | mɟarɟašta |
| Active participle | patxana | basmana | madməxxana | ɟarɟəššana | mɟarɟəššana |

Pattern I is the descendant of the pəʽal pattern of earlier Aramaic, pattern II corresponds to paʽʽel pattern, and pattern III corresponds to the ʼap̄ʽel pattern. Pattern I has a distinct form for the progressive stem, while the other patterns have identical forms for progressive and infinitive stems. Pattern II lacks an m- prefix in all its inflections, while pattern III has the m- prefix for all its inflections.

==== Verb suffixes ====
The present and past templates are inflected with two sets of sets of suffixes termed by Geoffrey Khan as S-suffixes and L-suffixes which mark the subject and expresses. The S-suffixes exist in 'default' and 'long' forms. The 'default' form is used by all speakers, while the 'long' form is formed by adding -ni after vowels and -ən after consonants with the exception of the 1st person singular and the 2nd person plural, which instead add -a. It is used by optionally by speakers from some villages on the Urmia Plain and the Caucasus, and not used when an adiditonal suffix is added to the verb.

S-Suffixes
| | suffix | | | | with pattern I verb p-t-x | | | |
| | default | | long | | default | | long | |
| | singular | plural | singular | plural | singular | plural | singular | plural |
|---|---|---|---|---|---|---|---|---|
| 1st (masculine) | -ən | -ax | -ina | -axən | pátxən | pátxax | patxína | patxáxən |
| 1st (feminine) | -an | -ax | -ana | -axən | pátxan | pátxax | patxána | patxáxən |
| 2nd (masculine) | -ət | -itun | -itən | -ituna | pátxət | patxítun | patxítən | patxítun |
| 2nd (feminine) | -at | -itun | -atən | -ituna | pátxa | patxítun | patxátən | patxítun |
| 3rd (masculine) | -∅ | -i | -∅ni | -ini | pátəx | pátxi | patə́xni | patxíni |
| 3rd (feminine) | -a | -i | -ani | -ini | pátxa | pátxi | patxáni | patxíni |

The final -t is dropped for the 2nd person feminine singular for pattern I verbs.

L-Suffixes
| | suffix | | with pattern I verb p-t-x | |
| | singular | plural | singular | plural |
|---|---|---|---|---|
| 1st | -li | -lan | ptə́x-li | ptə́x-lan |
| 2nd (masculine) | -lux | -loxun | ptə́x-lux | ptə́x-loxun |
| 2nd (feminine) | -lax | -loxun | ptə́x-lax | ptə́x-loxun |
| 3rd (masculine) | -lə | -lun | ptə́x-lə | ptə́x-lun |
| 3rd (feminine) | -la | -lun | ptə́x-la | ptə́x-lun |

The L-suffixes are most commonly used to express the past perfective. The speakers of Armenia the village of Canda in Georgia occasionally use the suffix le for the 3rd person plural, while the speakers of Siri on the southern periphery of the Urmia plain use the form -lu.

The S-suffixes may also be used with the past template of transitive verbs to express the object of an action, though the suffix -e is used for the 3rd person plural suffix rather than -i. The agent of past tense with S-suffixes is marked with an L-suffix, although many speakers may prefer to avoid using it to express 1st and 2nd objects. Since the object in such constructions is less marked than the subject, this can be considered to be form of ergative alignment, specifically split ergative since it only occurs in the past tense.

3rd person masculine singular agent with S-suffixes
| | suffix with pattern I verb k͈-t͈-l | |
| | singular | plural |
|---|---|---|
| 1st (masculine) | -^{+}k͈t͈ilə́n-lə 'He killed me (m.)' | -^{+}k͈t͈iláx-lə 'He killed us' |
| 1st (feminine) | -^{+}k͈t͈ilán-lə 'He killed me (m.)' | -^{+}k͈t͈iláx-lə 'He killed us' |
| 2nd (masculine) | -^{+}k͈t͈ilə́t-lə 'He killed you (ms.)' | -^{+}k͈t͈ilítun-lə 'He killed you (pl.)' |
| 2nd (feminine) | -^{+}k͈t͈ilát-lə 'He killed you (fs.)' | -^{+}k͈t͈ilítun-lə 'He killed you (pl.)' |
| 3rd (masculine) | -^{+}k͈t͈ə́l-lə 'He killed him' | -^{+}k͈t͈ilé-lə 'He killed them' |
| 3rd (feminine) | -^{+}k͈t͈ilá-lə 'He killed her' | -^{+}k͈t͈ilé-lə 'He killed them' |

The particle ci is optionally prefixed to inflected present verb forms to express habituality.

The future may be epxressed by prefixing the particle 'bət' to inflected present tense verb forms, coming from a phonetically reduced form of a volitive expression such as *bāʿē d- 'He wants to'.

The particle -va, derived from *hva in earlier Aramaic, can be suffixed to present and past templates to express various constructions.

==== Imperative ====
The imperative only has two forms, singular and plural, with the latter being marked with -un in verbs with a strong final radical.

==== Participles ====
The resultative participle derives from the passive participle in the determined state of earlier Aramaic. It can be used as an adjective, or in acompound verb form with the copula to express the perfect, or with the verb ʾávə to form the irrealis perfect.

The active participle is formed by attaching -an to the present stem, and can be used as an adjective or noun.

== See also ==
- Jewish Neo-Aramaic dialect of Urmia

== Sources ==
- Murre-van den Berg, Hendrika Lena (1999). From a Spoken to a Written Language: The Introduction and Development of Literary Urmia Aramaic in the Nineteenth Century. Nederlands Instituut voor het Nabije Oosten. ISBN 978-90-6258-981-4.
- Khan, Geoffrey (2016). The Neo-Aramaic Dialect of the Assyrian Christians of Urmi. Vol. 1. Leiden: Brill. ISBN 978-90-04-31393-4.
- Yaure, L. (April 1957). "A Poem in the Neo-Aramaic Dialect of Urmia". Journal of Near Eastern Studies. 16 (2): 73–87. doi:10.1086/371377. S2CID 162120167.
- 'The Missionaries' Assistants: The role of the Assyrians in the development of written Urmia Aramaic' in Journal of the Assyrian Academy Society, 10 (2), 1996
