= Jewish Neo-Aramaic dialect of Barzani =

Modern Jewish Aramaic language

Barzani Jewish Neo-Aramaic
- לשניד דינן Lišānîd d-Jānān
- Native to: Kurdistan
- Region: Jerusalem, originally from Bijil in Iraq
- Native speakers: 20 (2004)
- Language family: Afro-Asiatic: Semitic; Central Semitic; Aramaic; Eastern Aramaic; Northeastern; Barzani Jewish Neo-Aramaic

Language codes
- ISO 639-3: bjf
- Glottolog: barz1241
- ELP: Central Jewish Neo-Aramaic
- Barzani Jewish Neo-Aramaic is classified as Critically Endangered in Israel and Extinct in Iraq by the UNESCO Atlas of the World's Languages in Danger.

Barzani Jewish Neo-Aramaic is a modern Jewish Aramaic language, often called Neo-Aramaic or Judeo-Aramaic. It was originally spoken in three villages near Akre in Iraqi Kurdistan. The native name of the language is Lishanid Janan, which means 'our language', and is similar to names used by other Jewish Neo-Aramaic dialects (Lishan Didan, Lishanid Noshan).

It is nearly extinct, with only about 20 elderly speakers in 2004.

== Classification ==
Barzani Jewish Neo-Aramaic is classified as Afro-Asiatic, Semitic, and Aramaic language.

== Origin and use today ==
The Jewish inhabitants of a wide area from northern Iraq, eastern Turkey and north western Iran, corresponding to the area of Kurdistan, mostly spoke various dialects of modern Aramaic. The turmoil near the end of World War I and resettlement in Israel in 1951 (when eight families from Bijil moved to the new Jewish state) led to the decline of these traditional languages. This particular and distinct dialect of Jewish Neo-Aramaic was spoken in the villages of Bijil, Barzan and Shahe. It was known as Bijili until recently.

The last native speaker of Bijil Neo-Aramaic, Mrs. Rahel Avraham, died in Jerusalem in 1998. The remaining second-language speakers are all related and over 70 years of age, and most from Barzan. Other speakers are from Akre. Barzan and Akre are both located in Iraqi Kurdistan. The first language of these speakers is either Hebrew or Kurdish, and some also speak Arabic or another Neo-Aramaic dialect. Thus, the language is effectively extinct.

Most of the speakers of Barzani Jewish Neo-Aramaic live in Jerusalem, Israel today.

== History ==
Barzani Jewish Neo-Aramaic is part of the Northeastern Neo-Aramaic (NENA) speech-type. Many of the NENA languages are seriously endangered, like Barzani Jewish Neo-Aramaic. Most of the NENA languages became endangered since most of the Aramaic speaking Jewry began to immigrate to Israel. This occurred mostly during the 1950s. Barzani Jewish-Neo Aramaic stands out from these languages because it began its endangerment in the early 1900s. This occurred in Kurdistan. The reason for the decline of the language was that most of the speakers were dispersed and integrated into communities that spoke other languages than Barzani Jewish Neo-Aramaic. This dispersal occurred violently in many of the communities by outside forces.

Most speakers of Barzani Jewish Neo-Aramaic now speak Israeli Hebrew or Arabic.

== Dialects and varieties ==
Between the years of 1996 and 2000, three dialects of Barzani Jewish Neo-Aramaic were discovered. They are called Barzan, Shahe, and Bejil. Bejil is extinct.

It may be related to Lishanid Noshan, which has clusters around Arbil to the south east of Barzan. There may be some similarities between Barzani and the subdialect of Lishanid Noshan formerly spoken in the village of Dobe, 50 km north of Arbil. The Sandu dialect of Jewish Neo-Aramaic is quite similar to Barzani. However, studies suggest that it has more in common with Lishana Deni. There is evidence that the language was also spoken in the nearby village of Nerim, but no speaker from that village remains.

Barzani Jewish Neo-Aramaic has been infused with words from the Jewish Neo-Aramaic dialect of Zakho. This occurred due to the close proximity of the speakers of Barzani Jewish Neo-Aramaic and the dialect Zakho. This dialect is the most commonly spoken variant of Aramaic spoken in Jerusalem. This dialect is seen as more prestigious by the speakers and is most commonly understood.

== Examples ==
Hezy Mutzafi has recorded and translated two texts in Barzani Jewish Neo-Aramaic.

== See also ==
- Aramaic alphabet
- Aramaic language
- Jewish languages
