= Christian Neo-Aramaic dialect of Barwar =

Dialect of Northeastern Neo-Aramaic

Barwar Neo-Aramaic
- Language family: Afro-Asiatic: Semitic; Central Semitic; Northwest Semitic; Aramaic; Eastern Aramaic; Northeastern; Barwar Neo-Aramaic

Language codes
- ISO 639-3: –

Barwar Christian Neo-Aramaic is a dialect of Northeastern Neo-Aramaic spoken by ethnic Assyrians in the Barwari region of Iraq and Turkey.

== Phonology ==
Consonants
		Labial	Dental / alveolar	Palatoalveolar	Velar	Uvular	Pharyngeal	Laryngeal
Stops / affricates	Unvoiced aspirated	pʰ	tʰ	tʃʰ	kʰ	qʰ		ʔ
Stops / affricates	Unaspirated	p	t	tʃ	k			
Stops / affricates	Voiced	b	d	dʒ	g			
Stops / affricates	Emphatic	pˤ	tˤ	tʃˤ				
Fricatives	Unvoiced	f	s, θ	ʃ	x		ħ	h
Fricatives	Voiced	w	z, ð	ʒ	ɣ			
Fricatives	Emphatic		sˤ, zˤ					
Nasal		m, mˤ	n					
Lateral			l, lˤ					
Rhotic			ɾ, r					
Approximant		w		j				

== Sources ==
- Khan, Geoffrey (2009). The Neo-Aramaic Dialect of Barwar. BRILL. ISBN 978-90-04-16765-0.
