= Jewish Neo-Aramaic dialect of Dohok =

Language dialect

Jewish Neo-Aramaic of Dohok
- Region: Duhok, Israel
- Ethnicity: Assyrian Jews
- Language family: Afro-Asiatic: Semitic; West Semitic languages; Central Semitic; Northwest Semitic; Aramaic; Eastern Aramaic; Northeastern Neo-Aramaic; Jewish Neo-Aramaic of Dohok

Language codes
- ISO 639-3: –

The Jewish Neo-Aramaic dialect of Dohok is a dialect of Judeo-Aramaic originating from the Jewish community in Duhok, Iraqi Kurdistan. It is also spoken by Israeli Jews who left Iraq in the 1950s.

== History ==
The first records of a Jewish community in Duhok date to the late 19th century. Judeo-Dohoki Aramaic was spoken by the Jewish community in Duhok until they were forced to flee to Israel. After they arrived their children continued learning the language until the 1950s. This means that the youngest speakers are in their 60's or 70's and so the language is severely endangered.

== Features ==
Judeo-Dohoki Aramaic has several unique features that distinguish it from other Northeastern Neo-Aramaic dialects which include: Having conservative and periphrastic tense-aspect-modal forms, competing past transitive constructions, and splitting eventive and stative copula clauses.

== Sample text ==
Judeo-Duhoki Aramaic	English
ʾǝθ-wa xa beθa d-ʿāyə̀š-∅-wa...bab-ət beθa d-ʿāyǝš-∅-wa mǝn ṣìwe. g-ezǝl-∅-wa go ṭùra, q-qāte-∅-wa ṣìwe g-meθè-∅-wa-lu, dāré-∅-wa-lu. g-ewə̀ð-∅-wā-lu kàrta,ˈg-dāré-∅-wa-lu kàrta rəš xmara dìde. u-g-nābə́l-∅-wa-lu šùqa,ˈ gǝ-mzābǝn-∅-wa-lu. k-eθé-∅-wa,ˈ g-meθe-∅-wa ʾĭxala ta yalunke dìde.	There was a household who used to live on... whose father used to make his living by woodcutting. He used to go to the mountain and cut pieces of wood. He would bring them, place them on his donkey. He would bind them in a bundle. He would put them [as] a bundle on his donkey's back. He would take them to the market and sell them. Then, he would come back home and bring food for his children.
