= Christian Neo-Aramaic dialect of Senaya =

Dialect of Northeastern Neo-Aramaic

Senaya
- ܣܢܝܐ Senāya, ܣܘܪܝ Soray
- Pronunciation: [sɛnɑjɑ], [soraj]
- Native to: Iran
- Region: Tehran and Qazvin
- Native speakers: (60 cited 1997)
- Language family: Afro-Asiatic: Semitic; Central Semitic; Aramaic; Eastern Aramaic; Northeastern; Assyrian Neo-Aramaic; Senaya
- Writing system: Syriac (Māḏnhāyā alphabet)

Language codes
- ISO 639-3: syn
- Glottolog: sena1268
- ELP: Senaya

Senaya or Sanandaj Christian Neo-Aramaic is a dialect of Northeastern Neo-Aramaic originally spoken by Christians in Sanandaj, Kurdistan Province in Iran. Most speakers now live in California, United States and few families still live in Tehran, Iran. They are mostly members of the Chaldean Catholic Church. Senaya is significantly different from Sanandaj Jewish Neo-Aramaic.

== Origin, history and use today ==
The city of Sanandaj is at the southeastern periphery of the area of spoken modern Aramaic languages. Its geography makes the Neo-Aramaic of Sanandaj quite distinct from other dialects. Two different colloquial Aramaic dialects developed in Sanandaj: Jewish Hulaula and Christian Senaya. The two languages developed along different lines, so that the two are not mutually comprehensible. One distinctive difference between the two is the sound change associated with the Middle Aramaic fricative θ (th), often rendered as l in Hulaula, and s in Senaya. For example, mîθa, 'dead', is mîsa in Senaya, and mîla in Hulaula.

Most Senaya speakers are members of the Chaldean Catholic Church, which broke away from the Church of the East in the 16th century and entered into communion with the Roman Catholic Church. However, Senaya is to a small degree incomprehensible to speakers of Chaldean Neo-Aramaic, also Chaldean Catholics, originally from Iraq because of the heavy Kurdish influences on the language. In the middle of the 20th century, the Chaldean Bishop of Senna (as Sanandaj is called in Senaya) was moved to Tehran. The Christian community soon followed, so that there are no native speakers of Senaya left in Sanandaj. In Tehran, Senaya has been heavily influenced by the Urmežnāya dialect of Assyrian Neo-Aramaic spoken by the larger Church of the East community there. Both church communities use classical Syriac in worship. Senaya is written in the Madnhāyâ version of the Syriac alphabet, which is also used for classical Syriac.

== Research ==
1995 a research project under the leadership of Estiphan Panoussi in cooperation with Wolfhart Heinrichs granted by the Swedish Council for Research in the Humanities and Social Sciences analyzed the Senaya Dialect (Title: The Christian Senaya Dialect on Neo-Aramaic Texts, Grammar and Dictionary). The project produced three volumes: Senaya, A Christian Neo-Aramaic Dialect (Originally in Persian Kurdistan) (400 pages). Senaya Grammar (300 pages). A Dictionary of the Neo-Aramaic Senaya Dialect (800 pages).

== Senaya culture ==
The first recorded music with Senaya lyrics was released by Paul Caldani in 2002, titled Melodies of a Distant Land.

== See also ==
- Aramaic language
- Assyrian Neo-Aramaic
- Chaldean Catholic Church
- Chaldean Neo-Aramaic
- Syriac alphabet
- Syriac language

== Publications ==
- Estiphan Panoussi : On the Senaya Dialect, in Wolfhart Heinrichs (ed) Studies in Neo-Aramaic (Harvard Semitic Studies) 1990, pp. 107–129,ISBN 9789004369535.
- E. Panoussi: „Ein vorläufiges Vergglossar zum aussterbenden neuaramäischen Senaya-Dialekt“, Rivista Degli Studi Orientali, vol. LXV,(1991) fasc. 3-4:165-183.
- Heinrichs, Wolfhart (ed.) (1990). Studies in Neo-Aramaic. Scholars Press: Atlanta, Georgia. ISBN 1-55540-430-8.
