= Koy Sanjaq Christian Neo-Aramaic =

Variety of Northeastern Neo-Aramaic

Koy Sanjaq Surat
- ܣܘܪܬ Sûrat
- Native to: Iraq
- Region: Koy Sanjaq and Armota in Erbil Governorate
- Native speakers: (800 cited 1995)
- Language family: Afro-Asiatic: Semitic; Central Semitic; Aramaic; Eastern Aramaic; Northeastern; Koy Sanjaq Surat

Language codes
- ISO 639-3: kqd
- Glottolog: koys1242

Koy Sanjaq Christian Neo-Aramaic (native name: ܣܘܪܬ, romanized: Sûrat) is a variety of Northeastern Neo-Aramaic spoken by Christian Assyrians in Koy Sanjaq in the Erbil Governorate, Iraq. Koy Sanjaq Jewish Neo-Aramaic is a separate variety spoken by Jews in the same town.

== See also ==
- Assyrian Neo-Aramaic
- Chaldean Catholic Church
