= Trans-Zab Jewish Neo-Aramaic =

Northeastern Neo-Aramaic dialect of Jews in Kurdistan

Hulaulá
- יהודיותא Hûla'ûlā, לשנא נשן Lišānā Nošān
- Pronunciation: [ˌhulaʔuˈlɑ]
- Native to: Iran, Iraq
- Region: Israel, originally from Iranian Kurdistan and small parts of Iraqi Kurdistan
- Native speakers: (10,000 cited 1999)
- Language family: Afro-Asiatic: Semitic; Central Semitic; Northwest Semitic; Aramaic; Eastern Aramaic; Northeastern; Hulaulá

Language codes
- ISO 639-3: huy
- Glottolog: hula1244
- ELP: Hulaulá

Trans-Zab Jewish Neo-Aramaic, also known as Hulaulá (lit. 'Jewish'), is a grouping of related dialects of Northeastern Neo-Aramaic originally spoken by Jews in Iranian Kurdistan and easternmost Iraqi Kurdistan. Most speakers now live in Israel.

== Classification ==
Speakers sometimes call their language Lishana Noshan or Lishana Akhni, both of which mean 'our language'. To distinguish it from other dialects of Jewish Neo-Aramaic, Hulaulá is sometimes called Galiglu ('mine-yours'), demonstrating different use of prepositions and pronominal suffixes. Scholarly sources tend simply to call it Persian Kurdistani Jewish Neo-Aramaic.

In terms of internal classification of Trans-Zab Jewish Neo-Aramaic, Mutzafi (2008) suggests a three-way split based on the various forms of the positive present copula:

- Western Trans-Zab (Inter-Zab Jewish Neo-Aramaic), including the dialect cluster in Arbel
- North Eastern Trans-Zab (Jewish Neo-Aramaic dialect of Urmia), including the dialect cluster in Urmi and adjacent Irani and Turkish areas
- South Eastern Trans-Zab (including Sanandaj Jewish Neo-Aramaic), in Iranian Kurdistan and areas to the south, as well as Iraqi towns Sulemaniyya, Halabja, Penjwin and Khanaqin.

== History ==
Oral history in Lishan Noshan (Jewish Neo-Aramaic).

Hulaulá sits at the southeastern extreme of the wide area over which various Neo-Aramaic dialects used to be spoken. From Sanandaj, the capital of Kurdistan Province, Iran, the area extended north, to the banks of Lake Urmia. From there, it extended west to Lake Van (in Turkey), and south onto the Plain of Mosul (in Iraq). Then it headed east again, through Arbil, back to Sanandaj.

The upheavals in their traditional region after the First World War and the founding of the State of Israel led most of the Persian Jews to settle in the new homeland in the early 1950s. Most older speakers still have Kurdish as a second language, while younger generations have Hebrew. Hulaulá is the most widely spoken of all the Jewish Neo-Aramaic languages, with around 10,000 speakers. Almost all of these live in Israel, with a few remaining in Iran, and some in the United States.

== Intelligibility ==
Hulaulá is somewhat intelligible with the Jewish Neo-Aramaic dialect of Urmia (and Iranian Azerbaijan more broadly). It is also somewhat intelligible with its western neighbor, Inter-Zab Jewish Neo-Aramaic. However, it is unintelligible with the Christian Neo-Aramaic dialect of Senaya. Christians and Jews spoke completely different Neo-Aramaic languages in the same region. Like other Judaeo-Aramaic languages, Hulaulá is sometimes called Targumic, due to the long tradition of translating the Hebrew Bible into Aramaic, and the production of targums.

== Influences ==
Red markers represent Christian Neo-Aramaic varieties while blue represents Jewish ones and purple represents both spoken in the same town.

The various dialects of Hulaulá were clustered around the major settlement areas of Jews in the region: the cities of Sanandaj and Saqqez in Kurdistan Province, Iran, with a southern outpost at Kerend, and a cluster in the Iraqi city of Sulaymaniyah. Hulaulá is full of loanwords from Hebrew, Akkadian, Persian, and Kurdish.

== Writing System ==
Hulaulá is written in the Hebrew alphabet. Spelling tends to be highly phonetic, and elided letters are not written.

== Grammar ==
In general, the Trans-Zab dialect bundle has many isoglosses, such as final stress, e.g. gorá "man" vs. góra "elsewhere", merged interdentals /ṯ/ and /ḏ/ into /l/, e.g. belá "house" (< *bayṯā) and ʾelá "festival" (< *ʿeḏā), lexemes, e.g. băruxa "friend2, the definite suffix -aké borrowed from Gorani, and verb-final word order influenced by Iranian. Though most Trans-Zab dialects are similar, Trans-Zab Jewish Neo-Aramaic is unique in its definite suffix, -aké. The final é could have been borrowed from Akre or through contraction of -aka-y in Sorani.

All Trans-Zab varieties are verb-final, and its sentence structure is SOV.

Hulaulá exhibits many phonological and morphosyntactic innovations. The most widely applicable are listed below:

- interdental to lateral shift;
- dI and *It to the lateral consonant l, as in the case of *ʾidIa ̄Ita ̄ . *ʾila ̄la . ʾila ̄le ́ ‘‘hands’’;
- interdental to alveolar shift;
- dI and *It shifted to d rather than to l, chiefly in the vicinity of an alveolar sonorant l, r, or n;
- interdental to h;
  - a small number of lexical items shift when preceding an r or r(with a dot underneath);
- penultimate to ultimate stress;
  - in the nominal system, stress is shifted from the penultimate to the ultimate syllable. Importantly, this does not apply to adverbs. This change likely arose from contact with Kurdish and Azerbaijani; it is possible for this feature to have developed independently in different Trans-Zab dialect, but equally possibly is a proto-Trans-Zab which already possessed this characteristic. And,
- w to f l__-ta;
  - via partial assimilation to the /t/ of feminine suffix -ta, the consonant /w/ shifted to /f/. This is seen most often on feminine nouns and adjectives which were derived from older masculine forms. Therefore, /w/ and /f/ reflect a gender-based morphophonemic alternation.

== See also ==
- Aramaic alphabet
- Aramaic language
- Jewish languages
