= Jewish Neo-Aramaic dialect of Betanure =

Dialect of Aramaic

Betanure Jewish Neo-Aramaic
- lišānā deni / lišā́n huðāye / huðəθ~huðəθkí / amrāni~amrāní
- Region: Betanure
- Native speakers: at most 3 dozen (2008)
- Language family: Afro-Asiatic: Semitic; Central Semitic; Aramaic; Eastern Aramaic; Northeastern Neo-Aramaic; Betanure Jewish Neo-Aramaic

Language codes
- ISO 639-3: –
- Glottolog: beta1257

Betanure Jewish Neo-Aramaic, the local language variety of Betanure in Iraqi Kurdistan, is among the rarest and most seriously endangered varieties of Aramaic spoken at the present time. It is also one of the most conservative of both Jewish Neo-Aramaic languages and the Northeastern Neo-Aramaic languages in particular.

== History ==
In the 1940s, Betanure Jewish Neo-Aramaic was spoken by seventeen large families in the Jewish village of Betanure. The community migrated in its entirety to Israel in 1951. Ever since the dialect has been facing erosion from Israeli Hebrew and from other Neo-Aramaic varieties spoken in Israel.

== Phonology ==
Consonants
	Labial	Dental/Alveolar	Postalveolar/Palatal	Velar	Uvular	Pharyngeal	Glottal
Plosive/Affricate	p (ṗ) b (ḅ)	t ṭ d (ḍ)	č č̣ j	k g	q		ʼ
Fricative	f (v)	θ ð (ð̣) s ṣ z (ẓ)	š ṣ̌ ž (ẓ̌)		x ɣ	ḥ ʻ	h
Nasal	m ṃ	n					
Liquid	w	n l ḷ r ṛ	y				

== See also ==
- Jewish Neo-Aramaic dialect of Zakho
- Inter-Zab Jewish Neo-Aramaic
- Judeo-Aramaic languages

== Bibliography ==
- Mutzafi, Hezy (2008). The Jewish Neo-Aramaic Dialect of Betanure (PDF). Otto Harrassowitz Verlag. ISBN 978-3-447-05710-3.
