= Neo-Aramaic dialect of Bohtan =

Modern Eastern Neo-Aramaic language

Bohtan Neo-Aramaic
- ܣܘܪܬ Sôreth
- Native to: Russia, Georgia
- Region: Krymsk, Novopavlovsk, Kvemo Kartli
- Native speakers: 760 (2020)
- Language family: Afro-Asiatic: Semitic; Central Semitic; Aramaic; Eastern Aramaic; Northeastern; Bohtan–Hertevin; Bohtan Neo-Aramaic

Language codes
- ISO 639-3: bhn
- Glottolog: boht1238
- ELP: Bohtan Neo-Aramaic
- Bohtan Neo-Aramaic is classified as Severely Endangered by the UNESCO Atlas of the World's Languages in Danger

Bohtan Neo-Aramaic is a dialect of Northeastern Neo-Aramaic originally spoken by ethnic Assyrians on the plain of Bohtan in the Ottoman Empire. Its speakers were displaced during the Assyrian genocide in 1915 and settled in Gardabani, near Rustavi in Georgia, Göygöl and Ağstafa in Azerbaijan. However it is now spoken in Moscow, Krymsk and Novopavlosk, Russia. It is considered to be a dialect of Assyrian Neo-Aramaic since it is a northeastern Aramaic language and its speakers are ethnically Assyrians.

The closest related dialect is Hertevin, and Bohtan also shares many similarities with the peripheral Qaraqosh dialect.

== Genealogy ==
This dialect is derived from the Northeastern Neo-Aramaic (NENA) languages, which is made up by Bohtan Neo-Aramaic, Sureth (Assyrian/Chaldean Neo-Aramaic), Hertevin, Senaya and Koy Sanjat Surat. Bohtan refers to the area between the Tigris and Bohtan river . The dialect mostly spoken by Christian communities.

The Neo-Aramaic language is classified under Afroasiatic and the Bohtan dialect is more specifically one of the NENA dialects which are found south-eastern Turkey, northern Iraq and western Iran Due to the dislocation of NENA speakers, neighboring languages have influenced the dialects, such as Kurdish.

== Phonology ==
Bohtan's consonant inventory is typical of other NENA dialects. Unlike Hertevin, it merges /ħ/ and /x/ into /x/.

Consonant phonemes
	Labial		Dental/Alveolar			Palato- alveolar		Velar		Uvular	Glottal
	Labial		plain		emphatic	Palato- alveolar		Velar		Uvular	Glottal
Stop	p	b	t	d	tˤ			k	ɡ	q	ʔ
Fricative	f	v	s	z	sˤ	ʃ	ʒ	x	ɣ		h
Nasal	m		n								
Approximant						j		w			
Trill			r								
Lateral			l								

Vowel phonemes
	Front	Central	Back
High	i		u
Low		a	

== Status ==
Bohtan Neo-Aramaic is considered as a severely endangered language as it is estimated to have less than 500 speakers, mostly found in the former Soviet Union. Due to migration and intermarriage, younger generations speak the language less fluently and are expected to know Russian or Turkish as their first language.

== See also ==
- Assyria
- Assyrian people
- Aramaic language
- Assyrian Church of the East
- Assyrian Neo-Aramaic
- Turoyo
- Syriac language
- Syriac alphabet
