= Estiphan Panoussi =

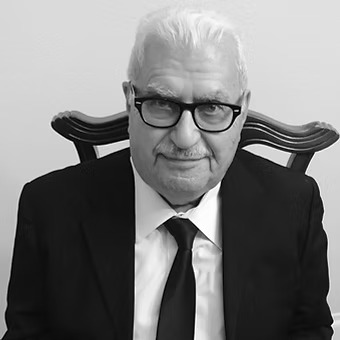
- Born: September 11, 1935 (age 91); Sanandaj, Iran
- Employer(s): Antelope Valley College - Lancaster, California

Estiphan Panoussi (born September 11, 1935 in Sanandaj, Iran) is an Iranian philologist, philosopher, orientalist, and international scholar of Iranian Assyrian origin. He is professor emeritus of the University of Gothenburg and native speaker of Senaya, a Northeastern Neo-Aramaic language.

== Life ==
After studying philosophy in Rome M.A. Philosophy (Pontifical Urban University) in 1958, Panoussi went to study oriental philology and philosophy at the Catholic University of Louvain and graduated with a Ph.D. degree in Oriental Philology and History. This was followed by research work in Iranian philology and Semitic studies at Tübingen. In 1967 Panoussi also received his second Ph.D. in Philosophy in Leuven. He acquired the knowledge of 10 ancient oriental languages, in particular he is considered as expert on the dialects of Aramaic, the language of Jesus, such as the marginal languages of the Senaya language. Panoussi is versed in medieval Arabic, ancient Greek, medieval Persian and Christian philosophy.

== Lecturer, professor and scholar ==
From 1964 to 1966 Panoussi was instructor for oriental philology and philosophy at the University of Giessen and the University of Marburg and from 1967 to 1973 assistant professor at the Free University of Berlin. From 1972 to 1989 Panoussi taught as professor at the University of Tehran, from 1978 to 1983 at the University of Utah, from 1989 to 1992 at the Catholic University of Eichstätt-Ingolstadt and from 1992 to 2000 at the University of Gothenburg. From 1997 to 1998 and from 2000 to 2002 he was visiting scholar at the Harvard University, Department of Near Eastern Languages and Cultures invited by Wolfhart Heinrichs.After retirement (Emeritius of the University of Gothenburg) in the year 2000 he still teach as adjunct instructor philosophy and oriental philology at the Antelope Valley College in Lancaster, California.

== Research and work ==
In addition to research projects on the relations between occidental, Persian and Indian philosophy, Aramaic philology (especially the dying Neo-Aramaic Senaya language) Panoussi established together with Rudolf Macúch the new research field of New Syriac, which is represented by the monograph: the Neusyrische Chrestomathie (“New Syriac Chrestomathy”), 1974 together with Rudolf Macúch. Panoussi developed the first Latin-Persian Dictionary and together with Wolfgang Heinrichs (Harvard University) conducted the research project The Christian Senaya Dialect of Neo-Aramaic: Text, Grammer and Dictionary.

== Publications ==
- Over 25 publications in Persian, but also in German, English and French.
- E. Panoussi: La notion de participation dans la philosophie d'Avicenne. Thèse de doctorat.Université catholique de Louvain, 1967
- E. Panoussi: The Influence of Persian Culture and World-View upon Plato. 2002, ISBN 964-94459-6-X
- E. Panoussi, R. Macuch: New Syrian Chrestomathy., Harrassowitz, Wiesbaden 1974, ISBN 3-447-01531-4
- E. Panoussi: La théosophie iranienne source d'Avicenne ?, in Revue Philosophique de Louvain, Tome 66 (troisième série, numéro 90), p. 239-266, éditions de l'Institut supérieur de philosophie, Louvain 1978
- E. Panoussi: The unique Arabic manuscript of Aristotle’s Ars rhetorica and its two editions published to date by ‘Abdurraḥmān Badawī and by Malmcom C. Lyons: Brill. Leiden 2000
- E. Panoussi: „Ein vorläufiges Vergglossar zum aussterbenden neuaramäischen Senaya-Dialekt“, Rivista Degli Studi Orientali, vol. LXV,(1991) fasc. 3-4:165-183.
- E. Panoussi: „Dērabūni dialect notes“, Studia Iranica, Mesopotamica et Anatolica,1997, 3:179-182.
