= Neo-Aramaic dialect of Qaraqosh =

Dialect of Neo-Aramaic spoken in the city of Qaraqosh, Iraq

Qaraqosh Neo-Aramaic
- Language family: Afro-Asiatic: Semitic; Central Semitic; Northwest Semitic; Aramaic; Eastern Aramaic; Northeastern; Qaraqosh Neo-Aramaic

Language codes
- ISO 639-3: –

Qaraqosh is one of the most conservative dialects of Northeastern Neo-Aramaic, spoken by ethnic Assyrians in the city of Qaraqosh (Bakhdida) in Iraq. Qaraqosh dialect has some similarities with the Aramaic spoken in nearby Karamlesh. It is a peripheral dialect in the dialect continuum of Neo-Aramaic stretching from Turoyo to western Iran.
