= Laryngeal =

Laryngeal may refer to:

- Laryngeal consonant, in phonetics
- Laryngeal theory of the Proto-Indo-European language
- Larynx

== See also ==
- Laryngealization, or creaky voice
