= Neo-Aramaic dialect of Hertevin =

Modern Eastern Aramaic or Syriac language

Hertevin
- ܣܘܪܬ Sôreth
- Pronunciation: [ˈhɛrtəvən], [ˈsorɛθ]
- Native to: Turkey
- Region: Siirt Province
- Native speakers: 4 (2012)
- Language family: Afro-Asiatic: Semitic; West Semitic; Central Semitic; Northwest Semitic; Aramaic; Eastern Aramaic; Northeastern; Bohtan–Hertevin; Hertevin
- Writing system: Syriac (Madnhāyâ alphabet)

Language codes
- ISO 639-3: hrt
- Glottolog: hert1241
- ELP: Northern Northeastern Neo-Aramaic

Hertevin is a dialect of Northeastern Neo-Aramaic originally spoken by Chaldean Catholics in a cluster of villages in Siirt Province in southeastern Turkey. Speakers of Hértevin Aramaic have emigrated mostly to the West, and are now scattered and isolated from one another. A few speakers remain in Turkey. The closest related language variety is Bohtan Neo-Aramaic. Hertevin also shares many similarities with Turoyo.

== Origins ==
Hértevin was 'discovered' by linguist Otto Jastrow in 1970, and first described in publication by him two years later. His recordings of the language are available on Heidelberg University's Semitic Sound Archive.

The speakers of the Hértevin dialect of Neo-Aramaic are traditionally Chaldean Catholics. Their area of habitation in and around the village of Hertevin (called Hertevinler in Turkish and Härtəvən in Kurdish), near the town of Pervari in Siirt Province is at the very northeastern extreme of the area where Eastern Neo-Aramaic languages were traditionally spoken. Thus, Hértevin is a peripheral dialect that has developed quite differently from related languages.

All Hértevin speakers are bilingual in Kurdish, and many also speak other languages. The Syriac alphabet is used for writing, but almost no literature in the Hértevin dialect exists. Church liturgy is in Syriac.

== Phonology ==
Its major phonetic feature is the loss of the voiceless velar fricative x, which has become a voiceless pharyngeal fricative, ħ. The original voiceless pharyngeal fricative has retained that pronunciation. In all the other dialects of eastern Neo-Aramaic the opposite is true: the voiceless pharyngeal fricative has been lost and merged with the voiceless velar fricative. /x/ does occur in loanwords to Hertevin. The [θ] and [ð] that occur in some other dialects of NENA merged back to [t] and [d].

Another feature of Hértevin Neo-Aramaic is its set of demonstratives. As with other languages of the eastern group, Hértevin makes no distinction between 'this' and 'that', and uses a single set of pronouns to cover both meanings: āwa (m. sg.), āya (f. sg.) and āni (pl.). However, unlike the other languages, Hértevin has developed an emphatic form of these pronouns that indicates 'this one right here': ōhā, ēhā and anhī.

Although belonging to the eastern, or northeastern, group of Neo-Aramaic dialects, Hértevin shares some features with the Turoyo language, of the central group, originating from nearby Mardin Province.

Consonant phonemes
	Labial		Dental/Alveolar			Palato- alveolar		Velar		Uvular	Pharyngeal		Glottal
	Labial		plain		emphatic	Palato- alveolar		Velar		Uvular	Pharyngeal		Glottal
Stop / Affricate	p	b	t	d	tˤ	tʃ	dʒ	k	ɡ	q			ʔ
Fricative	f		s	z	sˤ	ʃ	ʒ	x	(ɣ)		ħ	(ʕ)	h
Nasal	m		n										
Approximant	w					j							
Trill			r	(rˤ)									
Lateral			l	(lˤ)									

Vowel phonemes
	Front	Central	Back
High	i		u
Mid	e		o
Low		a	

- They are phonetically noted as long sounds [iː eː aː oː uː].
- /i/ and /u/ are phonetically slightly lowered as [i̞] and [u̞].

Unstressed vowel sounds
	Front	Central	Back
High/Mid	[ɪ ~ e]		[ʊ ~ o]
Low	[æ ~ ä]		

- /a/ can be raised to [ɐ] when preceding a pharyngeal /ħ/, and an unstressed [ä] can be heard as a more front [a] when preceding.

== See also ==
- Aramaic language
- Assyrian Church of the East
- Assyrian Neo-Aramaic
- Chaldean Neo-Aramaic
- Syriac alphabet
- Syriac language
