= Sanandaj Jewish Neo-Aramaic =

Variety of Neo-Aramaic formerly spoken by the Jews of Sanandaj

Sanandaj Neo-Aramaic
- Language family: Afro-Asiatic: Semitic; Central Semitic; Northwest Semitic; Aramaic; Eastern Aramaic; Northeastern; Sanandaj Neo-Aramaic

Language codes
- ISO 639-3: –

Sanandaj Jewish Neo-Aramaic is a variety of Northeastern Neo-Aramaic originally spoken by Jews in the city of Sanandaj, Iran. It is much more closely related to other Trans-Zab Jewish Neo-Aramaic dialects than the Neo-Aramaic dialect spoken by Christians in the same town.

== Phonology ==
Consonants
		Labial	Dental / Alveolar	Palato-alveolar	Velar	Uvular	Pharyngeal	Laryngeal
Stops / affricates	Unvoiced	p	t	tʃ	k	q		ʔ
Stops / affricates	Voiced	b	d	dʒ	g			
Stops / affricates	Emphatic		(ṭ)					
Fricatives	Unvoiced	f	s	ʃ	x		ħ	h
Fricatives	Voiced	w	z	ʒ	ɣ		ʕ	
Fricatives	Emphatic		(ṣ), (ż)					
Nasal		m	n					
Lateral			l (lˤ)					
Rhotic			ɾ, r, (rˤ)					
Approximant					j			

The historically pharyngealized consonants /ṭ/ and /ṣ/ in the current language have merged with /t/ and /s/ in many environments but sometimes affect the pronunciation of surrounding vowels. /lˤ/ and /rˤ/ are consistently pharyngealized.

== Grammar ==
Transitive verbs in the past tense are inflected for the oblique case with suffixes (which are prepositional phrases in origin), while intransitive verbs in the past tense are inflected by direct (nominative) suffixes. Object-verb (OV) word order is more common in Sanandaj than in some other dialects of Judeo Neo-Aramaic.

== Sources ==
- Khan, Geoffrey (2009). The Jewish Neo-Aramaic Dialect of Sanandaj. Gorgias Press. ISBN 978-1-60724-134-8.
