= Jewish Neo-Aramaic dialect of Urmia =

Neo-Aramaic dialect of Jews in Urmia

Lishán Didán
- לשן דידן Lišān Didān, לשנן Lišānān
- Pronunciation: [liˈʃan diˈdan] [liˈʃanan]
- Native to: Israel, United States; originally Iran, Turkey; briefly Azerbaijan, Georgia (country)
- Region: Jerusalem, Tel Aviv, New York, Los Angeles; originally from Iranian Azerbaijan
- Native speakers: (4,500 cited 2001)
- Language family: Afro-Asiatic: Semitic; Central Semitic; Northwest Semitic; Aramaic; Eastern Aramaic; Northeastern; Lishán Didán

Language codes
- ISO 639-3: trg
- Glottolog: lish1246
- ELP: Jewish Azerbaijani Neo-Aramaic

The Jewish Neo-Aramaic dialect of Urmia, a dialect of Northeastern Neo-Aramaic, was originally spoken by Jews in Urmia and surrounding areas of Iranian Azerbaijan from Salmas to Solduz and into what is now Yüksekova, Hakkâri and Başkale, Van Province in eastern Turkey. Most speakers now live in Israel.

== The Names of the Language ==
Lishan Didan is often referred to by scholars as Jewish (Persian) Azerbaijani Neo-Aramaic. Its speakers lived in Northern Iran in the cities and townships of Northern Iranian Azerbaijan, notably Urmia (briefly: Rezaiyeh), Salmas (also: Shahpur), and Naghade (also: Solduz).

Lishan Didan (pronunciation: [liːˈʃan diːˈdan]) literally translates to "our language" (morphological gloss: tongue-∅ GEN.1PL.EX). The name of the language exhibits clusivity marking: a more exact translation of "Lishan Didan" would be "our language, but not yours." When one speaker of the language is speaking to another, they may refer to the language using inclusive marking "Lishanan" (pronunciation: [liˈʃaːnan]), which can be translated as "our language, including yours" (morphological gloss: tongue-∅-1PL.IN). This distinction may be unique among the Neo-Aramaic Languages.

Similarly, speakers of the language often refer to themselves/their community as "Nash Didan" (pronunciation: naʃ diːˈdan), meaning "our people."

The term targum is often used to describe Lishan Didan, as it is a traditional and common term for many Jewish Neo-Aramaic dialects. When members of the Nash Didan communities of Urmia and Naghade immigrated to Israel in the 1950s, some referred to themselves as Edat haTargum ("The Community of the Targum") in Hebrew. This is in reference to the Nash Didan identity closely aligning with the long history of Aramaic Targum in Judaism. In addition to speaking a variety of Aramaic, Nash Didan have religious practices such as maintaining of the custom of meturgeman (targumic recitation: public recitation of a translation of the weekly Torah Reading into vernacular Aramaic) in the synagogue, and the age-old practice of using targumim to teach Biblical Hebrew. Due largely to these practices, some Nash Didan Jews had such a solid foundation of the Hebrew Language, they did not require ulpan classes upon immigration to Israel.

The language's ISO code is trg, stemming from the word targum.

Rahel speaking Jewish Neo-Aramaic (Lishan Didan)

== History ==
Various Neo-Aramaic dialects were spoken across a wide area from Lake Urmia to Lake Van (in Turkey), down to the plain of Mosul (in Iraq) and back across to Sanandaj (in Iran again). This cluster of languages can be split into a few categories based upon location and religion (Christian or Jewish). The Jewish Neo-Aramaic dialect of Urmia belongs to the Northeastern cluster of Jewish Neo-Aramaic.

There are two major dialect clusters of The Jewish Neo-Aramaic dialect of Urmia. The northern cluster of dialects centered on Urmia and Salmas in West Azerbaijan province of Iran, and extended into the Jewish villages of Van Province, Turkey. The southern cluster of dialects was focused on the town of Mahabad and villages just south of Lake Urmia. The dialects of the two clusters are intelligible to one another, and most of the differences are due to receiving loanwords from different languages: Standard Persian, Kurdish and Turkish languages especially.

=== The Nash Didan community ===
The history of Jews in this region goes back millennia. According to Nash Didan tradition, the Jewish community of Urmia dates back to the Babylonian Exile, when they were forcibly relocated from The Kingdom of Judah to Mesopotamia. Archeological evidence (including bronze, silver, and gold artifacts with Jewish iconography) points to Jewish settlement in the Urmia region as early as the 8th century BCE. This tradition further dictates that Nash Didan Jews did not return to Israel after the declaration issued by the emperor Cyrus II of Persia, after he conquered the region and ushered in the Second Temple period. Rather, they remained in the region under the Achaemenid Empire.

Many of the Jews of Urmia worked as peddlers in the cloth trade, while others were jewelers or goldsmiths. The degree of education for the boys was primary school, with only some advancing their Jewish schooling in a Talmud yeshiva. Some of these students earned their livelihood by making talismans and amulets. There was also a small girls yeshiva with only twenty pupils. The last head of the girls yeshiva was known as Rəbbi Hawa. The use of the title Rəbbi for female religious leaders is exceedingly rare in Jewish communities of the time. The existence of a girls yeshiva itself was unheard of in that time—at times, it may even have been the only one in the entire Middle East.

There were two main synagogues in Urmia, one large one and one smaller one. The large synagogue was called the synagogue of Sheikh Abdulla. The main synagogue shows strong influence of Qajar-era art and architecture. Sometime in the 1900s, a decision was to restore and renovate the synagogue, resulting in new paint covering the Hebrew and Aramaic calligraphy on the walls. It likely had a similar appearance to the calligraphy on the walls of the Tomb of Esther and Mordekhai in Hamedan. Today, the synagogues are abandoned and in disarray. The main synagogue is preserved by the Iranian Ministry of Cultural Heritage, Tourism and Handicrafts, who protected the site after a gang of illegal diggers attempted to loot the synagogue in 2021.

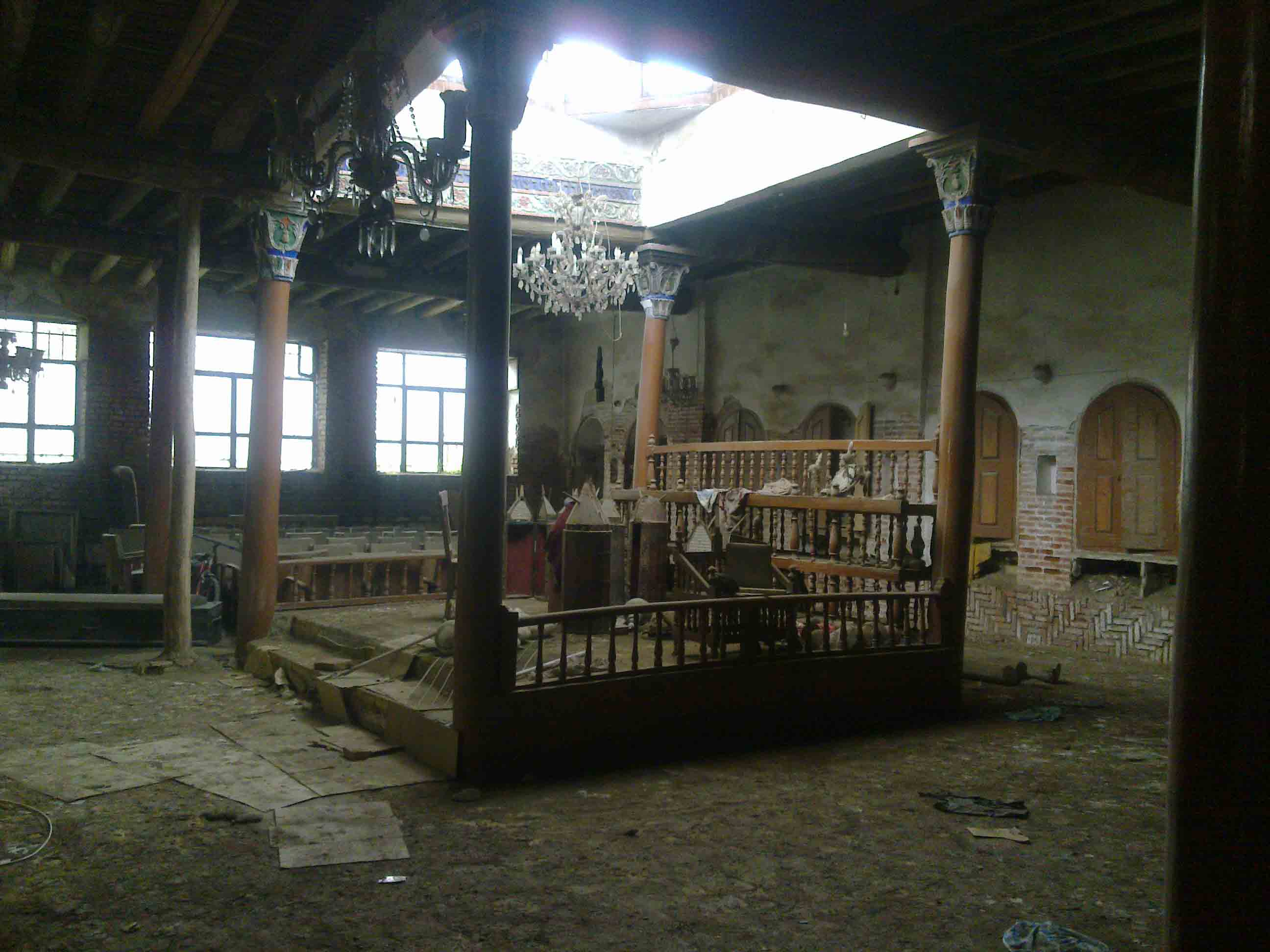
Kalimiyan Synagogue, Urmia, 2010

This region has long suffered instability. The Ottoman and Persian Empires often used tensions between Assyrians, Azeris, Kurds, and Armenians to fight proxy wars in the region. By 1918, due to the assassination of Shimun XIX Benyamin, Patriarch of the Church of the East as part of the Assyrian Genocide, and the invasion of the Ottoman forces, many Jews were uprooted from their homes and fled. Some Jews temporarily relocated to Tbilisi. The upheavals in their traditional region after World War I and the founding of the State of Israel led most Nash Didan to settle near Tel Aviv, Jerusalem, and small villages in various parts of the country. Due to persecution and relocation, Neo-Aramaic began to be replaced by the speech of younger generations by Modern Hebrew.

However, not all Jews went to Israel. Beginning in the early 1900s, some came to the United States, forming a community in Chicago. Others stayed in Iran until after the Iranian Revolution in 1979, eventually moving to New York, Los Angeles, and other places in the United States, joining existing Persian Jewish communities. A few moved to Tehran, and remain there into the 21st century.

Most native speakers speak Hebrew, English, or Persian to their children now. Fewer than 5000 people are known to speak Lishan Didan, most of whom are older adults in their sixties. The language faces extinction in the next few decades, largely due to the lack of a centralized community. While most native speakers are in Israel, the use of Lishan Didan in the United States is comparatively strong since many of them left Iran at least 30 years later.

The use of the internet, such as Facebook groups, has helped to keep the language in use. Institutions such as Wikitongues, the Jewish Language Project, the Endangered Language Alliance, and the Lishana Institute in Israel are working to document the language before it goes extinct. The Oxford School of Rare Jewish Languages offers a class on a different dialect, but will maybe one day include Lishan Didan. However, despite these efforts, the language is rapidly dying, and more still needs to be done to keep the language from extinction.

== Related Neo-Aramaic Languages ==
=== Related Languages ===
Lishan Didan is often confused with a similar language Inter-Zab Jewish Neo-Aramaic which is sometimes referred to as "Lishana Didan."

Another language is called Manuscript Barzani or Barzani Jewish Neo-Aramaic. Manuscript Barzani was spoken in a community in Iraqi Kurdistan of the Rewanduz/Arbel region. This language is also called targum, as it follows distinct translation techniques used by Targum Onkelos and Targum Jonathan. Many members of the Barzani family were rabbis and Torah scholars. The rabbis would travel around Kurdistan to set up and maintain yeshivas in the towns of Barzan, Aqra, Mosul, and Amediya. Much literature (commentaries on religious text, poetry, prayers, ritual instructions) has been compiled and published by the members of the Barzani family and their community. One of the most famous members of the Barzani family is Tanna'it Asenath Barzani, perhaps the first female rabbinical figure in modern Jewish history.

=== Intelligibility ===
Lishan DIdan, at the northeastern extreme of the area in which Neo-Aramaic is spoken, is somewhat intelligible with Trans-Zab Jewish Neo-Aramaic (spoken further south, in Iranian Kurdistan) and Inter-Zab Jewish Neo-Aramaic (formerly spoken around Kirkuk, Iraq).

However, the local Christian Neo-Aramaic dialects of Suret Neo-Aramaic are only mildly mutually intelligible: Christian and Jewish communities living side by side developed completely different variants of Aramaic that had more in common with their coreligionists living further away than with their neighbors. The topography in many of the dialects of Neo-Aramaic is so distinct that small villages, (like the town of Arodhin which consisted of two Jewish families), had their own dialect.

Jewish Neo-Aramaic varieties were by-and-large more similar to each other than to the dialects of their Christian neighbors, but there may be evidence for a small amount of sprachbrunding. It was generally far more likely for Jews to assimilate into Assyrian communities than vice versa, but the effect it had via language contact is unclear. On a linguistic level, Jewish languages often persist as a means of identity marking though Situational code-switching, and as such often develop in ways that intentionally stymy mutual intelligibility. The Jewish Neo-Aramaic dialect of Urmia in particular is sometimes described as asymmetrically intelligibile to other varieties of Neo-Aramaic (i.e. it is easier for speakers of these dialects to understand other dialects than for speakers of other dialects to understand these).

=== The Christian Neo-Aramaic Dialect of Urmia ===
An Assyrian community settled in Urmia after the local Kurds and Turkish army forced them to flee their homes. Over ten thousand people died en route to Urmia. After additional trouble in Urmia, the Assyrian community left and settled in Ba‘quba near Baghdad. In the early 1930s some moved to Syria and lived near the Euphratic Khabur between al-Hasakah and Ras al-Ayn.

Unlike the Assyrians who mainly lived in villages surrounding Urmia, Jews have historically lived in the city proper, largely due to social pressure, both internal (community structure) and external (e.g. antisemitism). Legally prohibited from certain kinds of work like farming, many Jews clustered in the city. However, there were a small number of villages in which Jews and Assyrians mixed. In general, the communities' had separate histories, and their languages show a remarkable amount of divergence.

The following displays examples of divergence in phonology, morphology, and lexicon between the Jewish and Assyrian Urmia dialects.

| Jewish Urmia | Assyrian Urmia | |
|---|---|---|
| belà | béta | 'house' |
| zorá | súra | 'small' |
| -u | -e | 'their' |
| -ilet | -iwət | 2ms copula |
| mqy | hmzm | 'to speak' |
| kwś | ˤsly | 'to descend' |

== Phonology ==
Consonants
| | | Labial | Alveolar | Postalveolar | Velar | Postvelar | Uvular | Glottal |
|---|---|---|---|---|---|---|---|---|
| Nasal | | m | n | | | | | |
| Plosive/ Affricate | voiceless | p | t | tʃ | k | | q | ʔ |
| Plosive/ Affricate | voiced | b | d | dʒ | ɡ | | | |
| Fricative | voiceless | f | s | ʃ | | x | | h |
| Fricative | voiced | w | z | ʒ | | ɣ | | |
| Approximant | | w | l | j | | | | |
| Rhotic | | | r | | | | | |

Most dialects feature a weakening of historically emphatic consonants. This dialect features suprasegmental emphasis (either pharyngealization or velarization) in historically emphatic contexts. For example, xəlta [xɯ̽lˁtˁɑ] (= "mistake") was likely originally xəlṭa [xəltˁa] (or some variation on that phonology). This word contrasts with xəlta [xɪltʰɑ] (= "eaten" (3fs)) only in suprasegmental emphasis, forming a minimal pair (the aspiration and vowel fronting are likely conditioned on the presence of emphasis). In the traditional orthography, words were often spelled using the historical spellings if known by the writer. xəlta may have been written חִלְטָא.

Sometimes these consonants can be realized differently:

- /q/ is often realized as [ɢ ~ ʁ] between a vowel/sonant and a vowel
- /w/ is realized as [β ~ v ~ w]
- /h/ is realized as [ɦ] in intervocalic and post-vocalic positions
- /n/ is realized as [ŋ] before /k/, /g/, and /q/
- /r/ is realized as [ɾ] in non-velarized words, and [r] in velarized words
- /b/, /d/, and /g/ tend to be devoiced when near voiceless consonants

=== Vowels ===
Vowels
| | Front | Central | Back |
|---|---|---|---|
| Close | i | | u |
| Mid | e | ə | o |
| Open | | | ɑ |

Some vowels are realized in many different ways:

- /a/ is realized as
  - [a] most commonly in non-velarized words
  - [ɑ] when
    - in the vicinity of back and labial consonants in stressed syllables
    - in pretonic open syllables
    - at the end of a word
    - in velarized words
  - [ʌ] when, for non-velarized words
    - in unstressed closed syllables
    - in open syllables that do not immediately precede the stress
  - [ɔ] when in the sequence /aø/ (sometimes)
  - [ɒ] when, for velarized words
    - in unstressed closed syllables
    - in open syllables that do not immediately precede the stress
- /ə/ is realized as
  - [ɪ ~ ə] in non-velarized words
  - [ɯ] in velarized words
- /o/ is realized as
  - [ø] in non-velarized words
  - [o] in velarized words
- /u/ is realized as
  - [y] in non-velarized words
    - [ʏ] in unstressed closed syllables
  - [u] in velarized words
    - [ʊ] in unstressed closed syllables
- /i/ and /e/ are realized with lowered onglides and/or offglides in velarized words

All Vowel Realizations
| | Front | | Central | Back | |
| | Unrounded | Rounded | Central | Unrounded | Rounded |
|---|---|---|---|---|---|
| Close | i | y | | ɯ | u |
| Near-Close | ɪ | ʏ | | ʊ | |
| Mid | e | ø | ə | | o |
| Open-Mid | | | | ʌ | ɔ |
| Open | a | | | ɑ | ɒ |

== Orthography [WIP] ==
Lishan Didan is usually written using Jabali, an alphabet very similar to Rashi script, and very closely related to the traditional scripts of Judeo-Persian, Bukhori, and Judeo-Arabic. Most writing in the language is non-standard: there is no "official" way to spell words. Each author will spell words in their own way, often highly phonetically. Despite this, many writers across the various Jewish Neo-Aramaic languages spell things very similarly, suggesting that there are informal guidelines that are mostly followed. Additionally, words that have been loaned from biblical Hebrew are often spelled as they would be in Hebrew, regardless of vernacular pronunciation.

The following represents an attempt to generalize the ways Lishan Didan is written, but it does not represent a universal truth. Real-world examples may vary in how closely they adhere to these rules.

=== Consonants ===
| | Alaf | Bet | | Gamal | | | Dalat | He | Waw | Zayin | | Het | | Tet | Yod | Kaf | |
|---|---|---|---|---|---|---|---|---|---|---|---|---|---|---|---|---|---|
| Jabali | | | | | | | | | | | ^{2} | | | | | | |
| Hebrew | א | ב | (בֿ)^{1} | ג | ע׳ / גֿ | ג׳ | ד | ה | ו | ז | ז׳ | ח | ח׳, ה | ט | י | כ ך | (כֿ) (ךֿ) |
| IPA | ∅, (ʔ) | b | w | ɡ | ɣ | dʒ | d | h | w | z | ʒ | x ~ χ | h, (ħ)^{3} | tˁ | j | k | x |
| Latin | (') | b | w | g | ǧ / gh | j | d | h | w | z | ž / zh | x / kh | h / (ḥ) | t / (ṭ) | y | k | x / kh |
| | Lamad | Mem | Nun | Samakh | Ayin | Pe | | Sadi | | Qof | Resh | Shin | | Taw | | | |
| Jabali | | | | | | | | | ^{2} | | | | ^{4} | ^{6} | | | |
| Hebrew | ל | מ | נ | ס | ע | פ ף | פֿ ףֿ | צ | צ׳ | ק | ר | שׁ | שׂ | ת | (תֿ) / (ת׳)^{5} | | |
| IPA | l | m | n | s | ʔ, ∅, (ʕ) | p | f | sˁ | tʃ | q | r | ʃ | s | t | (θ) | | |
| Latin | l | m | n | s | ' | p | f | s / (ṣ) | č / ch | q | r | š / sh | s | t | θ / th | | |

^{1}The letter Bet when spirantized (בֿ) is sometimes preserved when the author is familiar with the archaic spelling, especially if it is in a word that is from Biblical Hebrew (for example, the name יוכבד). However, (ו) is preferred for this sound in most cases.

^{2}The sounds [tʃ] (Modern Hebrew: צ׳) and [ʒ] (Modern Hebrew: ז׳) are often simply written as a gimel with a dot on top, the same way as [dʒ] (Modern Hebrew: ג׳). Due to the influence of Persian and modern Hebrew, some people use צ and ז with three dots on top instead.

^{3}The letter Het (ח׳) is used to represent the historical sound [ħ], in addition to its standard pronunciation [x~χ]. Due to the careful guarding of the pronunciation of Liturgical Hebrew, some Nash Didan will pronounce words loaned from Biblical Hebrew this way (ħ). Usually, however, it is pronounced [h], and the entire word is pronounced with suprasegmental emphasis. Very rarely, words loaned from Arabic will also be written this way. See Examples table for examples.

^{4}The letter Sin is rarely used. Again, it is only used in words loaned from Biblical Hebrew (and maybe Persian, though this is less common) when the author is familiar with the archaic spelling. See Examples table for examples.

^{5}In most dialects of Neo-Aramaic, including these, [θ] (Modern Hebrew: ת׳) is now pronounced either [l] or [t], and written with ל or ת respectively. This is also the case for [ð] (Modern Hebrew: ד׳) → [l] (ל) or [d] (ד). For example, the word bela [belɑ] meaning "house" was originally betha [beθɑ]; it is now written בֵילָא (compare to Hebrew cognate bayit / בית). Whether the letter became an [l] or simply underwent stopping in a specific word varies from dialect to dialect.

^{6}In words with suprasegmental emphasis, [t] (ת) is pronounced [tˁ] like (ט), but it almost always still written with a (ת) if it is known that the emphasis is caused by a different letter in the word. For an example, see the entry for [m] (מ) in the Examples chart below.

=== Nuqte (Niqqud) & Vowels ===
| | Dagesh | Qamas | | Patah | | Sere | Hiriq | | Shwa | Holam | Shuruq |
|---|---|---|---|---|---|---|---|---|---|---|---|
| Jabali | | | | | | | | | | | |
| Hebrew | ( ּ) | ( ָ)^{1} | (א ָ)^{2} | (א ַ)^{2} | ( ַ) | י ֵ | ( ִ) | י ִ | ( ְ) | וֹ | וּ |
| Latin | the consonant appears twice | a | a | | a | e | ə, (ı)^{3} | i, y | ∅ | o | u |
| IPA | : | ɔ, ɒ, ɑ | ɑ | | a | e | ɪ, ɯ | i | ∅ | ø, o | y, u |

^{1}Qamas is not used by all writers of Lishan Didan. Some elect to only use Patah since nearly all words do not phonemically distinguish between [a] and [ɑ]. However, in loanwords from Biblical Hebrew and Persian, the qamas sound [ɔ ~ ɒ] is sometimes preserved. For example, in the name "Haman" (from Maghillat Ester) is pronounced [hɔ:ˈmɔn ~ hɒ:ˈmɒn] and written הָמָן. In other cases, the loanword may instead trigger suprasegmental emphasis (often the case for loans from Persian). For example, the word "zəndan" (meaning "prison") is pronounced [zənˈdˁɑnˁ], but may written either זִנְדַן or זִנְדָן.

^{2}If a word ends in an "a," it will always end with an Alef (א). The vowel will also always be pronounced [ɑ]. The penultimate consonant will either have a Qamas or a Patah, entirely based on the author's preference.

^{3}Some authors, due to the influence of Azeri Turkish, may prefer to use the Turkish dotless i instead of shwa for [ə]

==== Rare Vowels ====
The vowels Holam (without Waw), Qubbus, Sere (without Yod following it), Shwa (when used to represent [ə]), and Segol are very rarely used. Sometimes when writing loanwords from Biblical Hebrew, an author may choose to use the archaic spelling if known. This is the only regular use of these vowels.

| | Sere | Segol | Shwa | Holam | Qubbus |
|---|---|---|---|---|---|
| Jabali | | | | | |
| Hebrew | ( ֵ) | ( ֶ) | ( ְ) | ( ֹ) | ( ֻ) |
| Latin | e | e | ə | o | u |
| IPA | e | e / ɛ | ɪ, ɯ | ø, o | y, u |

=== Examples ===
| Letter | Sound | Word | Jabali Alphabet | Hebrew Alphabet | Romanization | IPA | English | Aramaic^{10} | Hebrew^{10} |
|---|---|---|---|---|---|---|---|---|---|
| | ∅ | | | הוּדַאָא | ˁhudaa | [hudˁɑ::]^{1} | jew | יְהוּדָאָה | יְהוּדִי |
| | ʔ | | | מַלְאַךְֿ | mal'ax | [malˈʔax]^{2} | angel | מַלְאֲכָא | מַלְאָךְ |
| | b | | | בַרָא | bara | [ˈbaɾɑ] | later (temporally), behind (spatially) | | |
| | w | | | יוֹכַבֵד | yoxawed | [yoxɑ:ˈβˁedˁ] | Jochebed (name) | | יוֹכֶבֶד |
| | ɡ | | | גַרֵי | ˁgare | [gˁɑ:ˈrˁe] | roof (plurale tantum) | אִיגָּרָא | |
| | ɣ | | | הֵיצ׳ מִנְדִיגֿ^{3} | heč-məndiǧ | [ˈhetʃmɪndiɣ] | nothing (lit. none-thing) | | |
| | ɣ | | | בַגְֿוַאן | baǧwan | [baɣ'wan] | gardener | | |
| | dʒ | | | נַגַּ׳רָא | najjara | [naˈd͡ʒ:aɾɑ] | carpenter | נַגָּרָא | נַגָּר |
| | d | | | אִידָא | ida | [i:ˈdɑ] | hand | יְדָא | יָד |
| | h | | | דֵיהְוָא | dehwa | [deɦˈwɑ] | gold | דַּהֲבָא | זָהָב |
| | w | | | אַוַּל / אַוַול | awwal | [aˈv:al] | first | | |
| | z | | | אִיזַלָא | izala | [iza:ˈlɑ] | to go | אֲזַל | |
| / | ʒ | | | אוּרְמִיזְ׳נָא | urmižna | [yɾmiʒˈnɑ] | a person from Urmi (lit. Urmian) | | |
| / | ʒ | | | זַ׳אנְג | žang | [ʒang] | rust | | |
| | x ~ χ | | | חַבְרַא | xabra | [xabˈra] | sentence, phrase | | חִיבּוּר |
| | h, (ħ) | | | חָ׳תָן | ˁhatan | [hɑ:ˈtˁɑn], (some: [ħɔ:ˈtʰɔn]) | groom | חַתְנָא | חָתָן |
| | tˁ | | | טוּרַוֵי | ˁturawe | [tˁurˁɑ:ˈβˁe] | mountains | | |
| | j | | | אִדְיוֹם | ədyom | [ɪdˈjøm] | today | יוֹמָא דֵין | הַיּוֹם |
| | k | | | כַרָא | kara | [ka:ˈɾɑ] | butter | | |
| | x | | | ^{4}רֵישוֹךְ | rešox | [re:ˈʃøx] | your (m.) head | רֵישָׁךְ | רֹאשְׁךָ |
| | x | | | אִִיכַֿלָא | ixala | [ixa:ˈlɑ] | food, to eat | אוּכְלָא, אָכַל | אֹכֶל, לֶאֱכוֹל |
| | l | | | חוֹלָא | xola | [xø:ˈlɑ] | rope | חַבְלָא | חֶבֶל |
| | m | | | ^{5}דַמַרְתָא | ˁdamarta | [dˁɑmˁɑrˁˈtˁɑ] | vein, artery | | |
| | n | | | אַנָא | ana | [a:ˈnɑ] | I, me (1st person pronoun) | אֲנָא | אֲנִי |
| | ŋ | | | גְ׳וַנְקָא | jwanqa | [d͡ʒʋaŋˈɢɑ] | young man | | |
| | s | | | פִֿסֵּי | fəsse | [fɪˈs:e] | money (plurale tantum) | | |
| | ʔ, (ʕ) | | | עַמְרַא | ˁamra | [ˁamra] | wool | עַמְרָא | |
| | ʔ, (ʕ) | | | שִמְעוֹן | šəm'on | [ʃɪmˈʔon] | Simeon (name) | | שִׁמְעוֹן |
| | ∅ | | | אַרְעָא | ara | [a:ˈɾɑ] | land | אַרְעָא | |
| | p | | | דְיַפָא | dyapa | [dja:ˈpɑ] | to fold | | |
| | f | | | שַפְתַלְוֵי | šaftalwe | [ʃaftalˈwe] | peaches | | |
| | sˁ | | | מַצֵּי | ˁmasse | [mˁɑsˁ:e] | Maṣṣah Breads | | מַצּוֹת |
| / | tʃ | | | אִצָּ׳א^{6} | əčča | [ɪˈt͡ʃːɑ] | nine | תֵּשַׁע | תֵּשַׁע |
| | q | | | קַלְעָא | qala | [qaˈlɑ]^{7} | voice | קָלָא | קוֹל |
| | ɢ | | | בַקָּא | baqqa | [baˈɢːɑ] | frog | | |
| | q͡χ ~ q | | | זְקִרֵּי | zq̌ərre | [zq͡χɪˈrːe] | (he) remembered | דְּכַר | זָכַר |
| | ɾ | | | רַקוֹלֵי | raqole | [ɾaqøˈle] | to dance | רָקַד | לִרְקֹד |
| | r | | | רִירֵי | ˁrire | [rˁi:ˈrˁe] | saliva (plurale tantum) | רִירָא | רִיר |
| | ʃ | | | שַשָּא | šašša | [ʃaʃ:ɑ] | Shassha^{8} | | |
| | s | | | שָׂרָה^{9} | ˁsara | [sˁɑ:ˈrɑ], (some: [sɔ:ˈɾɔ]) | Sarah (name) | | שָׂרָה |
| | s | | | אַשְׂכַר | 'askar | [asˈkar] | soldier | | |
| | t | | | תוֹרָא | tora | [tʰø:ɾɑ] | bull, ox | תּוֹרָא | שׁוֹר |

^{1}One reason it is appropriate to consider this a zero consonant is because of the pitch contour and stress. A more descriptive phonetic transcription reveals this: [hu˨dˁɑ:˩˥ˈ∅ɑ˩˥].

^{2}This word is purposefully pronounced with a glottal stop [ʔ] by those who are careful to maintain the phonology of Liturgical Hebrew, the source of this word. It may also be pronounced simply [malˈ∅ax]. Note that it is still a zero consonant, even when the glottal stop is not produced. If it were not, the phonological rules of the language would enforce a pronunciation of [ma:ˈlax], including a lengthened vowel preceding the stressed syllable.

^{3}Some may pronounce as הֵיצ' מִנְדִיךֿ (heč-məndix, [ˈhetʃmɪndix]).

^{4}Authors who prefer (ח) for all [x] or are unfamiliar with the Hebrew genitive constructions may instead use רֵישוֹח. Sometimes they may even alternate even within the same document.

^{5}Since -ta (תָא-) is known to be the feminine singular case ending, we know that it has to be תָא- and not טָא-. A small minority of authors may still choose to use טָא-.

^{6}Sometimes written as "אִתְשַע"/"אִתְשַא", by more authentic/Hebrew-familiar authors. Historically, writing "אִתְשַע" is more accurate, but phonetically, writing "אִתְשַא" is more accurate - when carefully enunciating words, many pronounce it as [ɪt'ʃɑ].

^{7}When carefully enunciating words, many pronounce this word [qalˈ∅ɑ], as reflected in the spelling which includes an ע.

^{8}Ceremony celebrating the birth of a baby girl, one week after birth. Related to the Iraqi Jewish celebration of the same name: https://jel.jewish-languages.org/words/4223.

^{9}This is a very well-known Biblical name, and the Biblical Hebrew spelling is invariably retained.

^{10}Lishan Didan is heavily influenced by Biblical Hebrew, and is a descendant of Aramaic. If relevant, the translation to Hebrew/Aramaic is shown to emphasize the similarities between Lishan Didan and Hebrew/Aramaic.

== Comparisons ==
Below is a general comparison of different Neo-Aramaic dialect differences in phonology:

| Ancient Aramaic | A. A. pronunciation | Zāxō | Dehōk | ʿAmadiya | Urmia | Irbil |
|---|---|---|---|---|---|---|
| ידאֿ "hand" | ʾ īḏa | ʾ īza | ʾ īḏa | ʾ īda | īda | īla |
| ביתאֿ "house" | bēṯa | bēsa | bēṯa | bēṯa | bēla | bēla |

=== Reflexes ===
As a trans-Zab dialect, Jewish Salamas *ḏ has a reflex l like the Irbil dialect above. Examples are:

| Jewish Salamas | English |
|---|---|
| nəqlá | 'thin' |
| rqül | 'dance' |

The reflex for Jewish Salamas of *ṯ is l like the Urmia and Irbil dialects above. Examples are:

| Jewish Salamas | English |
|---|---|
| malá | 'village' |
| ksilá | 'hat' |
| sahlül(ġ)á | 'testimony' |

=== Suprasegmental Emphasis ===
Jewish Salamas lost the trait of word emphasis. This is the only Neo-Aramaic dialect that has completely lost this trait. Below is a comparison of Jewish Salamas and Christian Salamas suprasegmental emphasis.

| Jewish Salamas | Christian Salamas | English |
|---|---|---|
| amrá | +amra | 'wool' |
| bəzzá | +bezza | 'hole' |
| susəltá | +susiya | 'plait, pigtail' |

== Verbs ==
Urmia, like other Neo-Aramaic dialects, exhibits complex verbal morphology that allows for fine-grained expression of mood, tense, and aspect.

| +qat ́Ә́l | he kills |
| +qatolé | he is killing |
| +qat ́Ә́lwa | he used to kill |
| +qatolá-wele | he was killing |
| +qt ́Ә́lle | he killed |
| +qt ́Ә́lwale | he had killed |
| +qtilé | he has killed |
| +qtilá-wele | he had killed |

== Literature ==
Though few Neo-Aramaic dialects have written literature, educational and religious documents in Urmia were published and widely distributed in Urmia and the Kurdish mountains on both Persian and Turkish territory. Several newspapers were also published in the language. Most of this literature has been lost. However, at least one poem has been preserved, from the 1909 issue of the Syriac newspaper Kokba. The poem is the last literary survival of a classical Sugita, a type of Syriac poetry which often has three characteristic features:

1. initial stanzas provide the setting
2. the body of the poem is often dialogue between two characters
3. it is usually in acrostic form (optional. The poem presented here excludes this.)

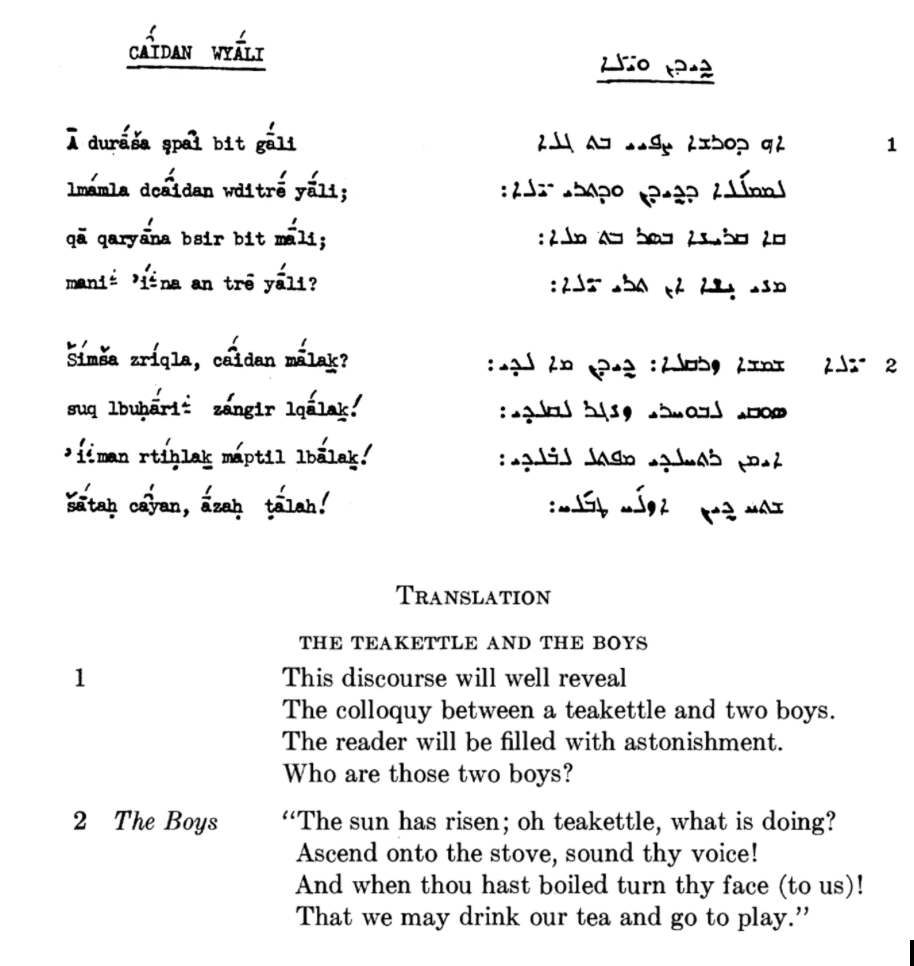
Last literary survival of a classical Sugita, a type of Syriac poetry

The poem evidences borrowing and words from Turkish, Persian, Kurdish, Arabic, and some Greek origins.

== See also ==
- Christian Neo-Aramaic dialect of Urmia
- Jewish languages
- Aramaic alphabet

== Bibliography ==
- Heinrichs, Wolfhart (ed.) (1990). Studies in Neo-Aramaic. Scholars Press: Atlanta, Georgia. ISBN 1-55540-430-8.
- Mahir Ünsal Eriş, Kürt Yahudileri - Din, Dil, Tarih, (Kurdish Jews) In Turkish, Kalan Publishing, Ankara, 2006
- Maclean, Arthur John (1895). Grammar of the dialects of vernacular Syriac: as spoken by the Eastern Syrians of Kurdistan, north-west Persia, and the Plain of Mosul: with notices of the vernacular of the Jews of Azerbaijan and of Zakhu near Mosul. Cambridge University Press, London.
