= Northeastern Neo-Aramaic =

Pre-WWI Neo-Aramaic dialects

- NENA
- Geographic distribution: Traditionally spoken northeast to the plain of Urmia in Iran, southeast to the plain of Mosul in Iraq, southwest to Al-Hasakah Governorate in Syria and as northwest as Tur Abdin in Turkey. Diaspora speakers in North America, Europe and Israel (the Jewish dialects).
- Linguistic classification: Afro-Asiatic: Semitic; Central Semitic; Northwest Semitic; Aramaic; Eastern Aramaic; Northeastern Neo-Aramaic
- Subdivisions: Christian: Suret; Koy Sanjaq; Barwar; Senaya; Urmia; Qaraqosh; Bohtan; Hertevin; Jewish: Inter-Zab; Trans-Zab; Sanandaj; Barzani; Betanure; Dohok; Koy Sanjaq; Urmia; Zakho

Language codes
- Glottolog: nort3241

Northeastern Neo-Aramaic (NENA) is a grouping of related dialects of Neo-Aramaic spoken before World War I as a vernacular language by Jews and Assyrian Christians between the Tigris and Lake Urmia, stretching north to Lake Van and southwards to Mosul and Kirkuk. As a result of the Assyrian genocide, Christian speakers were forced out of the area that is now Turkey and in the early 1950s most Jewish speakers moved to Israel. The Kurdish-Turkish conflict resulted in further dislocations of speaker populations. As of the 1990s, the NENA group had an estimated number of fluent speakers among the Assyrians just below 500,000, spread throughout the Middle East and the Assyrian diaspora. In 2007, linguist Geoffrey Khan wrote that many dialects were nearing extinction with fluent speakers difficult to find.

The other branches of Neo-Aramaic are Western Neo-Aramaic, Central Neo-Aramaic (Turoyo and Mlahso), and Mandaic. Some linguists classify NENA, as well as Turoyo and Mlahso, as a single dialect continuum.

== Influences ==
The NENA languages contain a large number of loanwords and some grammatical features from the extinct East Semitic Akkadian language of Mesopotamia (the original language of the Assyrians) and also in more modern times from their surrounding languages: Kurdish, Arabic, Persian, Azerbaijani and Turkish language. These languages are spoken by both Jews and Christian Assyrians from the area. Each variety of NENA is clearly Jewish or Assyrian.

However, not all varieties of one or other religious groups are intelligible with all others of the group. Likewise, in some places Jews and Assyrian Christians from the same locale speak mutually unintelligible varieties of Aramaic, where in other places their language is quite similar. The differences can be explained by the fact that NENA communities gradually became isolated into small groups spread over a wide area, and some had to be highly mobile due to various ethnic and religious persecutions.

The influence of classical Aramaic varieties – Syriac on Christian varieties and Targumic on Jewish communities – gives a dual heritage that further distinguishes language by faith. Many of the Jewish speakers of NENA varieties, the Kurdish Jews, now live in Israel, where Neo-Aramaic is endangered by the dominance of Modern Hebrew. Many Christian NENA speakers, who usually are Assyrian, are in diaspora in North America, Europe, Australia, the Caucasus and elsewhere, although indigenous communities remain in northern Iraq, south east Turkey, north east Syria and north west Iran, an area roughly comprising what had been ancient Assyria.

== Grouping ==
Red markers represent Christian Neo-Aramaic varieties while blue represents Jewish ones and purple represents both spoken in the same town.

SIL Ethnologue assigns ISO codes to twelve NENA varieties, two of them extinct:

- Suret (Assyrian Neo-Aramaic) [aii], 235,000 speakers (1994)
- Suret (Chaldean Neo-Aramaic) [cld], 216,000 speakers (1994)
- Judeo-Aramaic languages, spoken by Jewish communities in Israel
  - Jewish Neo-Aramaic dialect of Barzani [bjf] (Israel), extinct
  - Trans-Zab Jewish Neo-Aramaic [huy], 10,000 speakers (1990s)
  - Jewish Neo-Aramaic dialect of Zakho [lsd] 7,500 speakers (1990s)
  - Jewish Neo-Aramaic dialect of Urmia [trg], 4,500 speakers (2000)
  - Inter-Zab Jewish Neo-Aramaic [aij], 2,200 speakers (1990s)
- Neo-Aramaic dialect of Bohtan [bhn] (Georgia), 1,000 speakers (1990s)
- Neo-Aramaic dialect of Hertevin [hrt] (Turkey), 1,000 speakers (1990s)
- Koy Sanjaq Christian Neo-Aramaic [kqd] (Iraq), 900 speakers (1990s)
- Christian Neo-Aramaic dialect of Senaya [syn] (Iran), 460 speakers (1990s)

== List of dialects ==
Below is a full list of Northeastern Neo-Aramaic dialects from the North-Eastern Neo-Aramaic Database Project (as of 2023):

Dialect	Religion	Country	Region
Sulemaniyya, Jewish	Jewish	Iraq	NE
Qaraqosh (Baghdede)	Christian	Iraq	NW
Tisqopa	Christian	Iraq	NW
Aradhin, Christian	Christian	Iraq	NW
Karəmlesh	Christian	Iraq	NW
Derabun	Christian	Iraq	NW
Ankawa	Christian	Iraq	NE
Billin	Christian	Turkey	SE
Ashitha	Christian	Turkey	SE
Umra d-Shish	Christian	Iraq	NW
Baṭnaya	Christian	Iraq	NW
Sanandaj, Jewish	Jewish	Iran	W
Shōsh-u-Sharmən	Christian	Iraq	NW
Alqosh	Christian	Iraq	NW
Peshabur	Christian	Iraq	NW
Koy Sanjaq, Jewish	Jewish	Iraq	NE
Arbel	Jewish	Iraq	NE
Bēṣpən	Christian	Turkey	SE
Mēr	Christian	Turkey	SE
Išši	Christian	Turkey	SE
Baznaye	Christian	Turkey	SE
Gaznax	Christian	Turkey	SE
Harbole	Christian	Turkey	SE
Hertevin	Christian	Turkey	SE
Sardarid	Christian	Iran	NW
Bohtan	Christian	Turkey	SE
Sanandaj, Christian	Christian	Iran	W
Rustaqa	Jewish	Iraq	NE
Dobe	Jewish	Iraq	NW
Ruwanduz	Jewish	Iraq	NE
Saqǝz	Jewish	Iran	W
Telkepe	Christian	Iraq	NW
Iṣṣin	Christian	Iraq	NW
Mar-Yaqo	Christian	Iraq	NW
Tən	Christian	Iraq	NW
Barzani	Jewish	Iraq	NW
Betanure	Jewish	Iraq	NW
Shǝnno	Jewish	Iran	NW
Bokan	Jewish	Iran	W
Amedia, Jewish	Jewish	Iraq	NW
Zakho, Christian	Christian	Iraq	NW
Zakho, Jewish	Jewish	Iraq	NW
Urmia, Jewish	Jewish	Iran	NW
Diyana-Zariwaw	Christian	Iraq	NE
Sablagh	Jewish	Iran	W
Jilu	Christian	Turkey	SE
Challək	Christian	Iraq	NW
Darband	Christian	Iran	NW
Bebede	Christian	Iraq	NW
Dere	Christian	Iraq	NW
Nargəzine-Xarjawa	Christian	Iraq	NW
Aqra (Xərpa)	Christian	Iraq	NW
Aqra (town)	Christian	Iraq	NW
Xarjawa	Christian	Iraq	NW
Mangesh	Christian	Iraq	NW
Bidaro	Christian	Iraq	NW
Hamziye	Christian	Iraq	NW
Gargarnaye	Christian	Turkey	SE
Barwar	Christian	Iraq	NW
Nerwa, Jewish	Jewish	Iraq	NW
Salamas, Christian	Christian	Iran	NW
Bne Lagippa	Christian	Turkey	SE
Kerend	Jewish	Iran	W
Koy Sanjaq, Christian	Christian	Iraq	NE
Tikab	Jewish	Iran	W
Qarah Ḥasan	Jewish	Iran	W
Bijar	Jewish	Iran	W
Bariṭle	Christian	Iraq	NW
Baqopa	Christian	Iraq	NW
Sharanish	Christian	Iraq	NW
Zawitha	Christian	Iraq	NW
Solduz	Jewish	Iran	NW
Sulemaniyya, Christian	Christian	Iraq	NE
Ḥalabja	Jewish	Iraq	NE
Xanaqin	Jewish	Iraq	NE
Qaladeze	Jewish	Iraq	NE
Nerwa, Christian	Christian	Iraq	NW
Meze	Christian	Iraq	NW
Shaqlawa, Christian	Christian	Iraq	NE
Hassana	Christian	Turkey	SE
Marga	Christian	Iraq	NW
Bersive	Christian	Iraq	NW
Qarawilla	Christian	Iraq	NW
Challa, Jewish	Jewish	Turkey	SE
Sāt	Christian	Turkey	SE
Bāz (Maha Xtaya)	Christian	Turkey	SE
Ṭāl	Christian	Turkey	SE
Sarspido (duplicate?)	Christian	Turkey	SE
Van	Christian	Turkey	SE
Halana	Christian	Turkey	SE
Bnerumta (Upper Tiyari)	Christian	Turkey	SE
Tel Tamməṛ (Upper Tiyari)	Christian	Turkey	SE
Walṭo (Upper Tiyari)	Christian	Turkey	SE
Sarspido (Lower Tiyari)	Christian	Turkey	SE
Halmun	Christian	Turkey	SE
Txuma Gawaya	Christian	Turkey	SE
Txuma Mazṛa	Christian	Turkey	SE
Txuma Gudəkθa	Christian	Turkey	SE
Txuma Gəssa	Christian	Turkey	SE
Txuma Bərəjnaye	Christian	Turkey	SE
Arbuš	Christian		
Bāz (Khabur)	Christian	Turkey	SE
Dīz	Christian	Turkey	SE
Jilu (Khabur)	Christian	Turkey	SE
Šamməsdin Nočiya	Christian	Turkey	SE
Šamməsdin Iyyəl	Christian	Turkey	SE
Šamməsdin Marbišo	Christian	Turkey	SE
Barwar	Christian	Turkey	SE
Gawar, Christian	Christian	Turkey	SE
Qočanəṣ	Christian	Turkey	SE
Van (Timur, Khabur)	Christian	Turkey	SE
Saṛa (Khabur)	Christian	Turkey	SE
Saṛa (Armenia)	Christian	Georgia, Armenia	
Lewən	Christian	Turkey	SE
Urmia, Christian	Christian	Iran	NW
Bne ~ Mne Maθa (Lower Tiyari)	Christian	Turkey	SE
Bne ~ Mne Belaθa (Upper Tiyari)	Christian	Turkey	SE
Bāz (Aruntus)	Christian	Turkey	SE
Mawana	Christian	Iran	NW
Gawilan	Christian	Iran	NW
Salamas, Jewish	Jewish	Iran	NW
Komane	Christian	Iraq	NW
Derəgni	Christian	Iraq	NW
Bədyəl	Christian	Iraq	NE
Enəške	Christian	Iraq	NW
Təlla	Christian	Iraq	NW
Darbandoke	Christian	Iraq	NE
Shiyuz	Christian	Iraq	NW
Qasr Shirin	Jewish	Iran	W
Bāz (Shwawa)	Christian	Turkey	SE
Bāz (Aghgab)	Christian	Turkey	SE
Shahe	Jewish	Iraq	NW
Bəjil	Jewish	Iraq	NW
Umra	Christian	Turkey	SE
Gargarnaye (Azran)	Christian	Turkey	SE
Dohok, Jewish	Jewish	Iraq	NW
Jənnet	Christian	Turkey	SE
Hoz	Christian	Turkey	SE
Harmashe	Christian	Iraq	NW
Dohok, Christian	Christian	Iraq	NW
Hawdiyan	Christian	Iraq	NE
Aradhin, Jewish	Jewish	Iraq	NW
Azax	Christian	Iraq	NW
Bāz (Rekan)	Christian	Iraq	NW
Yarda	Christian	Iraq	NW
Alanish	Christian	Iraq	NW
Gzira	Jewish	Turkey	SE
Gawar, Jewish	Jewish	Turkey	SE
Dawadiya	Christian	Iraq	NW
Challa, Christian	Christian	Turkey	SE
Nəxla (Gerbish)	Christian	Iraq	NW
Nəxla (Dinarta)	Christian	Iraq	NW
Nuhawa	Christian	Iraq	NW
Nəxla (Sanaye)	Christian	Iraq	NW
Sandu	Jewish	Iraq	NW
Shaqlawa, Jewish	Jewish	Iraq	NE
Dehe	Christian	Iraq	NW
Gramun	Christian	Turkey	SE
Tazacand	Christian	Iran	NW
Amedia, Christian	Christian	Iraq	NW

== Sources ==
- Coghill, Eleanor. "Some notable features in North-Eastern Neo-Aramaic dialects of Iraq". Neo-Aramaic Dialect Studies. Gorgias Press. pp. 91–104. ISBN 978-1-4632-1161-5.
- Fox, Samuel Ethan (1994). "The Relationships of the Eastern Neo-Aramaic Dialects". Journal of the American Oriental Society. 114 (2): 154–162. doi:10.2307/605827. ISSN 0003-0279. JSTOR 605827.
- Fox, Samuel Ethan (2008). "North-Eastern Neo-Aramaic and the Middle Aramaic Dialects". Neo-Aramaic Dialect Studies. Gorgias Press. pp. 1–18. ISBN 978-1-4632-1161-5.
- Gutman, Ariel (2018). Attributive constructions in North-Eastern Neo-Aramaic. Language Science Press. ISBN 978-3-96110-081-1.
- Khan, Geoffrey (2007). "Grammatical borrowing in North-eastern Neo-Aramaic". Empirical Approaches to Language Typology [EALT]. Mouton de Gruyter. pp. 197–214. doi:10.1515/9783110199192.197. ISBN 978-3-11-019919-2.
- Khan, Geoffrey (2012). "North-Eastern Neo-Aramaic". The Semitic Languages: An International Handbook. Walter de Gruyter. pp. 708–724. ISBN 978-3-11-025158-6.
- Khan, Geoffrey; Napiorkowska, Lidia, eds. (2015). Neo-Aramaic in Its Linguistic Context. Gorgias Press. ISBN 978-1-4632-0410-5.
- Khan, Geoffrey (2018). "Remarks on the Historical Development and Syntax of the Copula in North-Eastern Neo-Aramaic Dialects". Aramaic Studies. 16 (2): 234–269. doi:10.1163/17455227-01602010. S2CID 195503300.
- Khan, Geoffrey (2020). "The Perfect in North-Eastern Neo-Aramaic". Perfects in Indo-European Languages and Beyond. John Benjamins Publishing Company. ISBN 978-90-272-6090-1.
- Khan, Geoffrey; Noorlander, Paul, eds. (2021). Studies in the Grammar and Lexicon of Neo-Aramaic. Semitic Languages and Cultures. Vol. 5. Open Book Publishers. doi:10.11647/OBP.0209. ISBN 978-1-78374-952-2. S2CID 231785174.
- Ragagnin, Elisabetta (2020). "Some Notes on Turkic and Mongolic Elements in North-Eastern Neo-Aramaic Varieties". Eine hundertblättrige Tulpe - Bir ṣadbarg lāla. De Gruyter. pp. 361–371. ISBN 978-3-11-220924-0.
- Mutzafi, Hezy (2005). "Etymological Notes on North-Eastern Neo-Aramaic". Aramaic Studies. 3 (1): 83–107. doi:10.1177/1477835105053516.
- Mutzafi, Hezy (2006). "On the Etymology of Some Enigmatic Words in North-Eastern Neo-Aramaic". Aramaic Studies. 4 (1): 83–99. doi:10.1177/1477835106066037.
- Mutzafi, Hezy (2018). "Folk Etymology in the North-Eastern Neo-Aramaic Dialects". Aramaic Studies. 16 (2): 215–233. doi:10.1163/17455227-01602007. S2CID 195509710.
