= Jewish Neo-Aramaic dialect of Challa =

Judeo Neo-Aramaic dialect formerly spoken in Turkey

Challa Neo-Aramaic
- Language family: Afro-Asiatic: Semitic; Central Semitic; Northwest Semitic; Aramaic; Eastern Aramaic; Northeastern; Challa Neo-Aramaic

Language codes
- ISO 639-3: –

Challa Jewish Neo-Aramaic was a dialect of Northeastern Neo-Aramaic formerly spoken by Jews in Çukurca (Tyari).

== Phonology ==
Consonant inventory
		Labial		Alveolar		Postalveolar		Palatal	Velar		Uvular	Pharyngeal		Glottal
Stop / Affricate	Voiceless	p	pˤ	t	tˤ	tʃ	tʃˤ		k	kˤ	q			ʔ
Stop / Affricate	Voiced	b	bˤ	d	dˤ	dʒ			g					
Fricative	Voiceless	f		s	sˤ	ʃ			x			ħ		h
Fricative	Voiced	v	vˤ	z	zˤ	ʒ							ʕ	
Nasal		m	mˤ	n	nˤ									
Approximant		w						j						
Trill				r	rˤ									
Lateral				l	lˤ									
