= Jewish Neo-Aramaic dialect of Zakho =

Northeastern Neo-Aramaic dialect of Iraqi Jews

Lishana Deni
- לשנא דני Lišānā Denī
- Pronunciation: [liˈʃɑnɑ ˈdɛni]
- Native to: Iraq
- Region: Zakho, Iraq
- Language family: Afro-Asiatic: Semitic; Central Semitic; Northwest Semitic; Aramaic; Eastern Aramaic; Northeastern; Neo-Aramaic; Lishana Deni

Language codes
- ISO 639-3: lsd
- Glottolog: lish1247
- ELP: Lishana Deni

The Jewish Neo-Aramaic dialect of Zakho is a dialect of Northeastern Neo-Aramaic originally spoken by Jews in Zakho, Iraq. Following the exodus of Jews from the Muslim lands, most speakers now live in Israel, principally Jerusalem and surrounding villages.

Rakhma speaking Jewish Neo-Aramaic (Lishana Deni)

== Grammar ==
It is unknown exactly how person markers are established as either pronominal affixes, or agreement markers. There are two explanations. The first relies on synchronic change, using evidence from Classical Syriac. This analysis reveals that the same person marker may simply behave differently in different syntactic environments. The second explanation suggests that there is no clear-cut dichotomy between pronominal affixes and agreement markers at all, citing transitional cases as an example.

== See also ==
- Aramaic alphabet
- Betanure Jewish Neo-Aramaic
- Jewish languages
