= Betanure =

- Location in Iraq Betanure (Iraqi Kurdistan)
- Coordinates: 37.2009°N 43.46889°E
- Country: Iraq
- Region: Kurdistan Region
- Governorate: Dohuk Governorate
- District: Amedi District

Betanure (Note: Alternatively transliterated as Betannūrē, Be-Tannūrē, and Beth Tannūrē.) (Syriac: ܒܝܬ ܬܢܘܪܐ, Kurdish: بێته‌نورێ, Hebrew: בית תנורה) is a village in Dohuk Governorate in Kurdistan Region, Iraq. It is located near the Iraq–Turkey border in the district of Amedi District and the historical region of Barwari.

== Etymology ==
The name of the village is formed from a combination of Neo-Aramaic be and tanūre, meaning "house (or place) of earthenware baking ovens". Non-Jews called it Gūḏāye, meaning "where the Jews are".

== History ==
According to local tradition, the village had been settled by Jews after the Babylonian captivity in the 6th century BC. The Jews of Betanure were served by a synagogue constructed in the 10th century, a beth midrash, and a cave, within which the Prophet Elijah was traditionally believed to have had stayed. It was believed that the village's population had been instructed to build the synagogue and cave shrine by the Prophet Elijah. They spoke the Jewish Neo-Aramaic dialect of Betanure, a local variety of Northeastern Neo-Aramaic.

Betanure is first attested in the 16th century in a letter from Rabbi Yaʻqob ben Yahūda Mizrāḥi, head of a yeshiva in Mosul, to Jewish notables of Amedi in an appeal for financial support, which has been interpreted to suggest the village was prosperous and well established by this time. The village occasionally lent its name to the Church of the East diocese of Barwari, and Yahballaha is mentioned as bishop of Beth Tannura in 1607. A bishop of Beth Tannura named Yahballaha is recorded in 1731, and the archbishop Ishoʿyahb of Beth Tannura is attested in 1817, 1829, and 1831. The Jewish traveller J. J. Benjamin visited the village in 1848, and recorded that it was inhabited by about 30 Jewish families.

In 1881, Betanure was inhabited by approximately 40 or 50 Jewish families. An attack on the village by Kurds of the Pinyanish tribe in 1885 resulted in the death of several Jews, and caused the village's population to seek refuge amongst nearby villages. Christians from the neighbouring village of Bishmiyaye intervened to protect Betanure against the Kurds, but being outnumbered, suffered casualties, and were forced to withdraw. It was claimed that, until their displacement, Betanure was exclusively inhabited by a Jewish population, consisting of 55 families in 100 households, and had two religious schools with 150 male students, which is likely exaggerated. Due to Kurdish hostility, the village's population was only able to return at the end of 1893 or soon afterwards after a delegation had been sent to the Chief Rabbi of the Ottoman Empire, who succeeded in having letters sent from the Grand Vizier and the Ministry of the Interior to instruct the Vali of Mosul to allow the Jews' return.

Betanure was frequently ransacked by Assyrians of the Tyari tribe, and it was reported that they looted the village on Good Friday for three successive years as punishment for the perceived Jewish complicity in the Crucifixion of Jesus. By 1914, as a consequence of the Kurdish and Assyrian raids, Betanure's population had decreased to 49 Jewish households. During the First World War, the village was completely abandoned as its entire population fled mainly to Amedi, Duhok, and nearby Kurdish villages, likely to escape the ongoing Assyrian genocide. At the war's end, the village's population returned, and was joined by refugees from Hakkari, including three Jewish families from Challa and four Church of the East families of the Tyari, who were resettled at Betanure by the British authorities in the early 1920s.

Some of the village's Jewish population emigrated to British Palestine in the early 1920s and in 1935, most of whom settled at Jerusalem. Betanure was visited by activists from the Jewish Agency for Israel in 1946-1947, and eventually the entire Jewish community emigrated to Israel in 1951, by which time there were only 15 Jewish families still residing in the village. Most of the Jews of Betanure who emigrated in 1951 settled at the villages of Nes Harim and Even Sapir, whilst some settled at Jerusalem and Maoz Zion. In the census of 1957, Betanure was inhabited by 29 Assyrians, and there were 15 families in five households in 1961. In 1977, the village was destroyed, with the exception of the cave of Elijah, and its population of 24 Assyrian families displaced, by pro-government militia as part of the government's ethnic cleansing of Assyrians in the area.

Betanure lay in ruins until four houses were constructed by the Supreme Committee of Christian Affairs, and the village was inhabited by 15 adherents of the Assyrian Church of the East in 2012.

== Bibliography ==
- Donabed, Sargon George (2015). Reforging a Forgotten History: Iraq and the Assyrians in the Twentieth Century. Edinburgh University Press.
- Mutzafi, Hezy (2008). The Jewish Neo-Aramaic Dialect of Betanure (province of Dihok). Otto Harrassowitz Verlag.
- Wilmshurst, David (2000). The Ecclesiastical Organisation of the Church of the East, 1318–1913. Peeters Publishers.
