= Jewish Neo-Aramaic dialect of Koy Sanjaq =

Dialect of Northeastern Neo-Aramaic in the Inter-Zab Jewish Neo-Aramaic cluster

Koy Sanjaq Neo-Aramaic
- Language family: Afro-Asiatic: Semitic; Central Semitic; Northwest Semitic; Aramaic; Eastern Aramaic; Northeastern; Koy Sanjaq Neo-Aramaic

Language codes
- ISO 639-3: –
- Glottolog: koys1241

Koy Sanjaq Jewish Neo-Aramaic is a dialect of Northeastern Neo-Aramaic in the Inter-Zab Jewish Neo-Aramaic cluster. All speakers migrated to Israel in 1951 and as of 1985, the language was being acquired by children raised in Shtula, a moshav in Israel.

== Phonology ==
Consonants
| | | Labial | Dental / Alveolar | Emphatic | Palatoalveolar | Velar | Uvular | Pharyngeal | Glottal |
|---|---|---|---|---|---|---|---|---|---|
| Stops / affricates | Unvoiced | p | t | tˤ | tʃ | k | q | | ʔ |
| Stops / affricates | Voiced | b | d | | dʒ | g | | | |
| Fricatives | Unvoiced | f | s | sˤ | ʃ | | χ | ħ | h |
| Fricatives | Voiced | | z | zˤ | ʒ | | ʁ | ʕ | |
| Nasal | | m | n | mˤ | | | | | |
| Lateral | | | l | lˤ | | | | | |
| Rhotic | | | ɾ, r | | | | | | |
| Approximant | | w | | | j | | | | |

== Sources ==
- Mutzafi, Hezy (2002). The Jewish Neo-Aramaic Dialect of Koy Sanjaq (Iraqi Kurdistan). Otto Harrassowitz Verlag. ISBN 978-3-447-04915-3.
- Hoberman, Robert D. (1985). "The Phonology of Pharyngeals and Pharyngealization in Pre-Modern Aramaic". Journal of the American Oriental Society. 105 (2): 221–231. doi:10.2307/601702. ISSN 0003-0279. JSTOR 601702.
