= Inter-Zab Jewish Neo-Aramaic =

Modern Jewish-Aramaic dialect of Iraq

- לשניד נשן Lišānîd Nošān lit. 'the language of our people', לשנא דידן Lišānā Dîdān, lit. 'our language'
- Pronunciation: [liʃɑˈnid noˈʃɑ̃]
- Region: Jerusalem as well as some villages and towns around it, originally from eastern and northern Iraq and Southeastern Turkey.
- Native speakers: 3,500 (2018)
- Language family: Afro-Asiatic: Semitic; Central Semitic; Northwest Semitic; Aramaic; Eastern Aramaic; Northeastern; Inter-Zab Jewish Neo-Aramaic

Language codes
- ISO 639-3: aij
- Glottolog: lish1245
- ELP: Inter-Zab Jewish Neo-Aramaic

Inter-Zab Jewish Neo-Aramaic, or Lishanid Noshan, is a modern Jewish-Aramaic dialect, a variant of Northeastern Neo-Aramaic. It was originally spoken in Kurdistan Region of Iraq, in and around Erbil between the Great Zab and Little Zab rivers, it was also spoken in Turkey in the city of Cizre and its environs and in the Hakkari Mountains. Most speakers now live in Israel.

== Phonology ==
Lishanid Noshan has 40 phonemes. 34 of them are consonants, and 6 of them are vowels. Laryngeals and pharyngeals originally found in Lishanid Noshan have not been preserved. In Aramaic, *ʕ, a voiced pharyngeal fricative is prominent in words. However, it has weakened in Lishanid Noshan to /ʔ/ or zero.

Regarding interdental fricatives, there has been a shift seen with *t and *d. *h, the original unvoiced pharyngeal fricative, has fused with the velar fricative /x/ in Northeastern Neo-Aramaic dialects. This is not the case for Lishanid Noshan. *h can still be seen in some words such as dbh, which means "to slaughter."

Word stress often occurs on the final syllable of stems of nominals and verbs.

Consonants (Arbel)
| | | Labial | Dental / Alveolar | Postalveolar | Palatal | Velar | Uvular | Glottal |
|---|---|---|---|---|---|---|---|---|
| Stops / affricates | Unvoiced | p | t | tʃ | | k | q | ʔ |
| Stops / affricates | Voiced | b | d | dʒ | | g | | |
| Stops / affricates | Unaspirated | | (t˭) | (tʃ˭) | | (k˭) | | |
| Stops / affricates | Emphatic | | tˤ (dˤ) | | | | | |
| Fricatives | Unvoiced | f | s | ʃ | | x | ħ | h |
| Fricatives | Voiced | w | z | (ʒ) | | ɣ | ʕ | |
| Fricatives | Emphatic | | sˤ (zˤ) | | | | | |
| Nasal | | m | n | | | | | |
| Lateral | | | l (lˤ) | | | | | |
| Rhotic | | | r | | | | | |
| Approximant | | w | | | j | | | |

== Grammar ==
=== Word Order ===
Subjects in Lishand Noshan often come before the verb when they are full nominals. The referent of subject nominals in this canonical order can be identified from the prior discourse or through assumed shared information between the speakers. Sometimes, it can also be used when the referent of the subject nominal has not been entered into the discourse yet and is not identifiable by the hearer.

ʔiyyá kābrá qìmle.
This man got up.

Nominals that function as direct objects in verb clauses are normally positioned before the verb.

=== Articles ===
==== Definite articles ====
In Lishanid Noshan, -ake is the definite article. According to Khan, this affix is another sign of how Kurdish dialects have influenced this language; the Kurdish dialects have -aka for the direct case and -akay in the oblique case. When -ake is added to a noun, the singular and plural endings -a and -e are taken off.

==== Indefinite articles ====
Definiteness is expressed if the speaker assumes the hearer has background knowledge on the nominal being inserted into the conversation.

=== Negation ===
Regarding negative copular clauses, Lishanid Noshan differentiates constructions that use the negative present versus the negative past.

==== Negative present copula ====
Negative present copula is often inserted before or after the predicate. This particular copula usually contains the main stress of the intonation group. This phenomenon can happen in the middle of a predicate phrase.

ʔiyyá mewānid didì lewé?
Is he not my guest?

==== Negative past copula ====
This particular type of copular comes before the predicate in Lishanid Noshan very often. The main stress is inserted either on the predicate phrase or on la, the negator in Lishanid Noshan. Subject nominals are seen either before or after the copula.

lá-wela mga-làxxa.
It was not like here.

=== Interrogative clauses ===
Interrogative clauses that can be answered with a yes or a no are differentiated from non-interrogative clauses solely by intonation. The yes-no type of interrogatives has an intonation pattern that rises in pitch where the main stress is; there is no drop in pitch in any of the syllables that come after the part where the main stress is.

gbát xa-čày?
Do you want a tea?

lā la-ġzèlox mallá?
Have you not seen the mullah?

=== Prepositional case ===
Certain verbs in Lishanid Noshan mark their complement with the preposition b-.

badéniwa bi-xlulá.
They began the wedding.

tqèle-bbeu.
He pleaded with him.

== See also ==
- Aramaic alphabet
- Aramaic language
- Jewish languages
- Assyrian Neo-Aramaic
- Syriac language
- Syriac-Aramaic
