= Eastern Aramaic languages =

Group of Aramaic languages

Eastern Aramaic
- Geographic distribution: Fertile Crescent (Iraq, northwestern Iran, northern & eastern Syria, Southeastern Anatolia), Eastern Arabia
- Linguistic classification: Afro-Asiatic: Semitic; Central Semitic; Northwest Semitic; Aramaic; Eastern Aramaic
- Subdivisions: Classical Syriac (†); Jewish Babylonian Aramaic (†); Classical Mandaic (Neo-Mandaic); Hatran Aramaic †; Palmyrene Aramaic † (Note: The Palmyrene dialect has a dual affiliation because it combines features of both Western and Eastern Aramaic, but it is somewhat closer to the Eastern branch.); Northeastern Neo-Aramaic; Central Neo-Aramaic; Qatrayith †

Language codes
- Glottolog: east2680

Eastern Aramaic refers to a group of dialects that evolved historically from the varieties of Aramaic spoken in the core territories of Mesopotamia (modern-day Iraq, southeastern Turkey and parts of northeastern Syria) and further expanded into northern Syria, eastern Arabia and northwestern Iran. This is in contrast to the Western Aramaic varieties found predominantly in the southern Levant, encompassing most parts of modern western Syria and Israel. Most speakers are Assyrians (including Chaldean Catholics), although there is a minority of Bavlim Jews and Mandaeans who also speak modern varieties of Eastern Aramaic.

== Speakers ==
Numbers of fluent speakers range from approximately 300,000 to 575,000, with the main languages being Suret (Assyrian; 220,000 speakers) and Surayt/Turoyo (250,000 speakers), with a number of smaller closely related languages with no more than 5,000 to 10,000 speakers between them.

Despite their names, they are not restricted to specific churches; Chaldean Neo-Aramaic being spoken by members of the Chaldean Catholic Church, Assyrian Church of the East, Syriac Orthodox Church, Assyrian Protestant churches, and Assyrian Neo-Aramaic and Turoyo being spoken by members of the Chaldean Catholic Church etc. Despite some differences, Assyrian and Chaldean Neo-Aramaic are both colloquially known as Sureth amongst speakers.

In addition, there are approximately 25,000 speakers of Jewish varieties, and some 5,000 fluent speakers of the Mandaic language among the some 50,000 Mandaeans, an ethno-gnostic minority in Iraq and Iran.

Students of the Talmud will also have a passive mastery of Jewish Babylonian Aramaic, adding hundreds of thousands of users with varying levels of Aramaic mastery.

== History ==
Historically, eastern varieties of Aramaic have been more dominant, mainly due to their political acceptance in the Neo-Assyrian Empire and Achaemenid Persian empires. With the later loss of political platforms to Greek and Persian, Eastern Aramaic continued to be used by the population of Mesopotamia.

During the Late Middle Aramaic period, spanning from 300 B.C.E. to 200 C.E., Aramaic diverged into its eastern and western branches.

In Edessa, present-day Urfa in southeast Turkey, the local variety of Eastern Middle Aramaic known as Classical Syriac had emerged. Between the 1st and 4th centuries AD, it became a liturgical language among the Eastern Rite Syriac Christians throughout the Middle East. It was used in the Peshitta and by the poet Ephrem the Syrian, as well as in the schools of Edessa and Nisibis. Later, it was adopted by the Saint Thomas Christians in India.

In the region of Babylonia (modern southern Iraq), rabbinical schools flourished, producing the Targumim and Talmud, making the language a standard of religious Jewish scholarship.

Among the Mandaean community in the Khuzestan province of Iran and Iraq, another variety of Eastern Aramaic, known as Mandaic, became the liturgical language of Mandaeism.

These varieties have widely influenced the less prominent Western Aramaic dialects of the southern Levant, and the three classical languages outlined above have also influenced numerous vernacular varieties of Eastern Aramaic, some of which are spoken to this day, largely by the Assyrians, Mizrahi Jews and Mandaeans (see Neo-Aramaic languages). Since the Muslim conquest of Persia of the seventh century, most of the population of the Middle East has undergone a gradual but steady language shift to Arabic.

However there are still between some 550,000 – 1,000,000 fluent Eastern Neo-Aramaic speakers among the indigenous Assyrians of northern Iraq, northeast Syria, southeastern Turkey and northwestern Iran, as well as small migrant communities in Lebanon, Israel, Jordan, Armenia, Georgia, southern Russia and Azerbaijan. Most of these are members of the Assyrian Church of the East, Syriac Orthodox Church, Chaldean Catholic Church, Ancient Church of the East, Assyrian Pentecostal Church and Assyrian Evangelical Church. A further number may have a more sparse understanding of the language, due to pressures in their homelands to speak Arabic, Turkish, Persian or Kurdish, and as a result of the diaspora to the Western World.

== See also ==
- Aramaic studies
- Bible translations into Aramaic
