= Central Semitic languages =

Proposed group of Semitic languages

Central Semitic
- Geographic distribution: West Asia
- Linguistic classification: Afro-Asiatic: Semitic; West Semitic; Central Semitic
- Subdivisions: Northwest Semitic; Arabic (including Maltese); Sayhadic?; Dadanitic †; Thamudic †

Language codes
- Glottolog: cent2236

The Central Semitic languages comprise one of the two groups of West Semitic languages, the other being the South Semitic languages. They are therefore of the Semitic phylum of the Afroasiatic language family. The group is spoken across much of the Arabian peninsula and north into the Levant region.

Central Semitic can itself be further divided into two groups: Arabic and Northwest Semitic. Northwest Semitic languages largely fall into the Canaanite languages (such as Ammonite, Phoenician and Hebrew) and Aramaic.

== Overview ==
Distinctive features of Central Semitic languages include the following:

- An innovative negation marker *bal, of uncertain origin.
- The generalization of t as the suffix conjugation past tense marker, levelling an earlier alternation between *k in the first person and *t in the second person.
- A new prefix conjugation for the non-past tense, of the form ya-qtulu, replacing the inherited ya-qattal form (they are schematic verbal forms, as if derived from an example triconsonantal root q-t-l).
- Pharyngealization of the emphatic consonants, which were previously articulated as ejective.

Different classification systems disagree on the precise structure of the group. The most common approach divides it into Arabic and Northwest Semitic, while SIL Ethnologue has South Central Semitic (including Arabic and Hebrew) vs. Aramaic.

The main distinction between Arabic and the Northwest Semitic languages is the presence of broken plurals in the former. The majority of Arabic nouns (apart from participles) form plurals in this manner, whereas virtually all nouns in the Northwest Semitic languages form their plurals with a suffix. For example, the Arabic بَيْت bayt ("house") becomes بُيُوت buyūt ("houses"); the Hebrew בַּיִת bayit ("house") becomes בָּתִּים bāttīm ("houses").
