= Soddo Gurage people =

Subgroup of Gurage language in Ethiopia

The Soddo or Kistane (Gurage: ክስታኔ; endonym: Aymellel, Gordena) are a subgroup of the Gurage who inhabit the south-central part of Ethiopia, considered the northern geographic and linguistic subset of the Gurage and speak the Soddo Gurage language or Kistanigna (ክስታንኛ). They primarily inhabit the Soddo (woreda) in the Gurage Zone, but large amounts also live in various parts of Ethiopia, particularly in Addis Abeba, Nazret, Butajira, and Dire Dawa. They are related to the Sebat Bet Gurage and other Gurage sub-groups, however, in contrast to the Sebat Bet Gurage and Silte, they are exclusively and almost entirely Ethiopian Orthodox Tewahedo Christians. The Soddo Gurage are known for and pride themselves on their Orthodox Christian identity, which they have historically practiced since ancient times, and from which their name Kistane (lit. Christian) derives its name, as it is the traditional and preferred name by locals for the people, although Soddo is still popularly used.

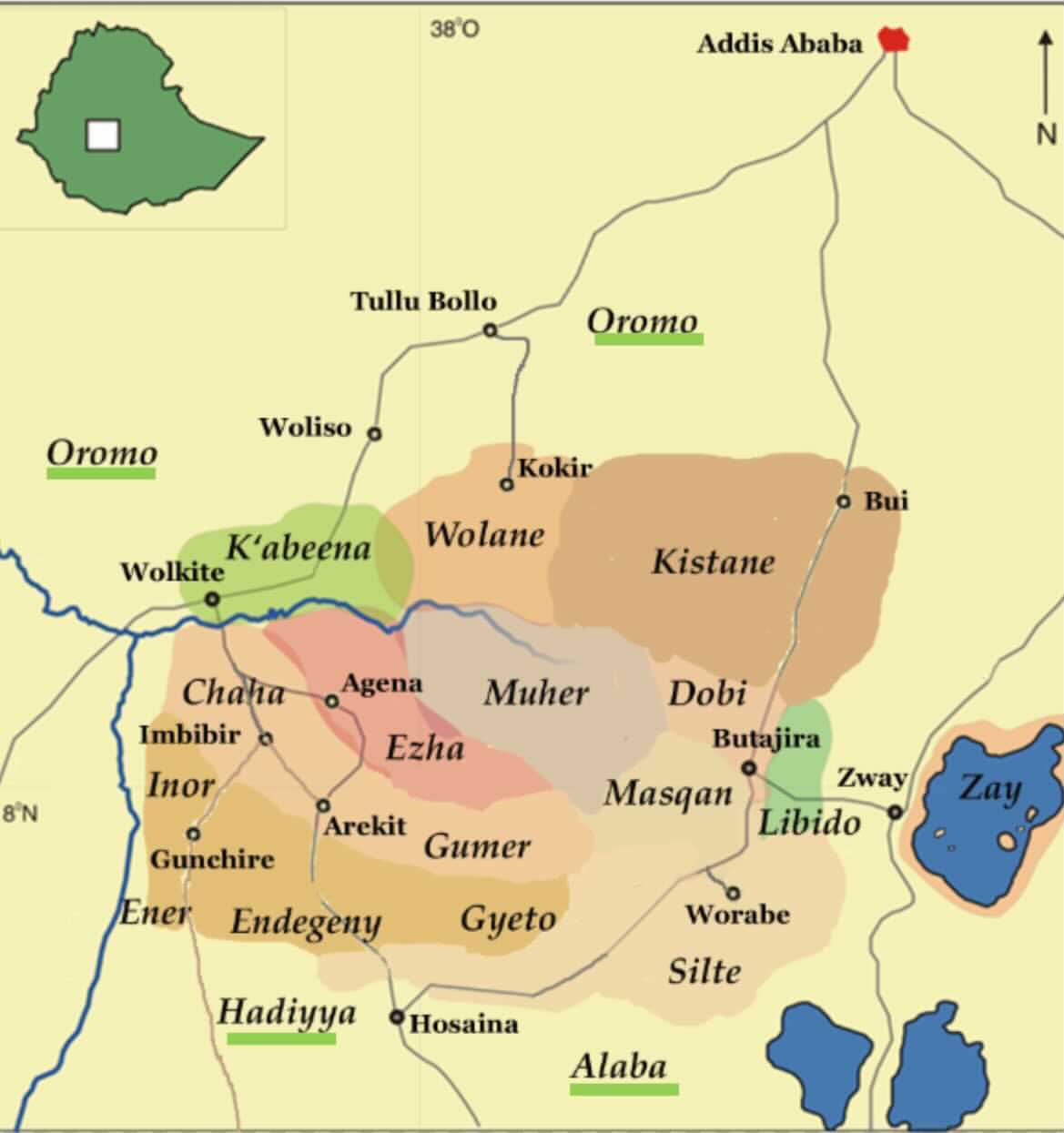
A map of the geographic distribution of the different subgroups of the Gurage

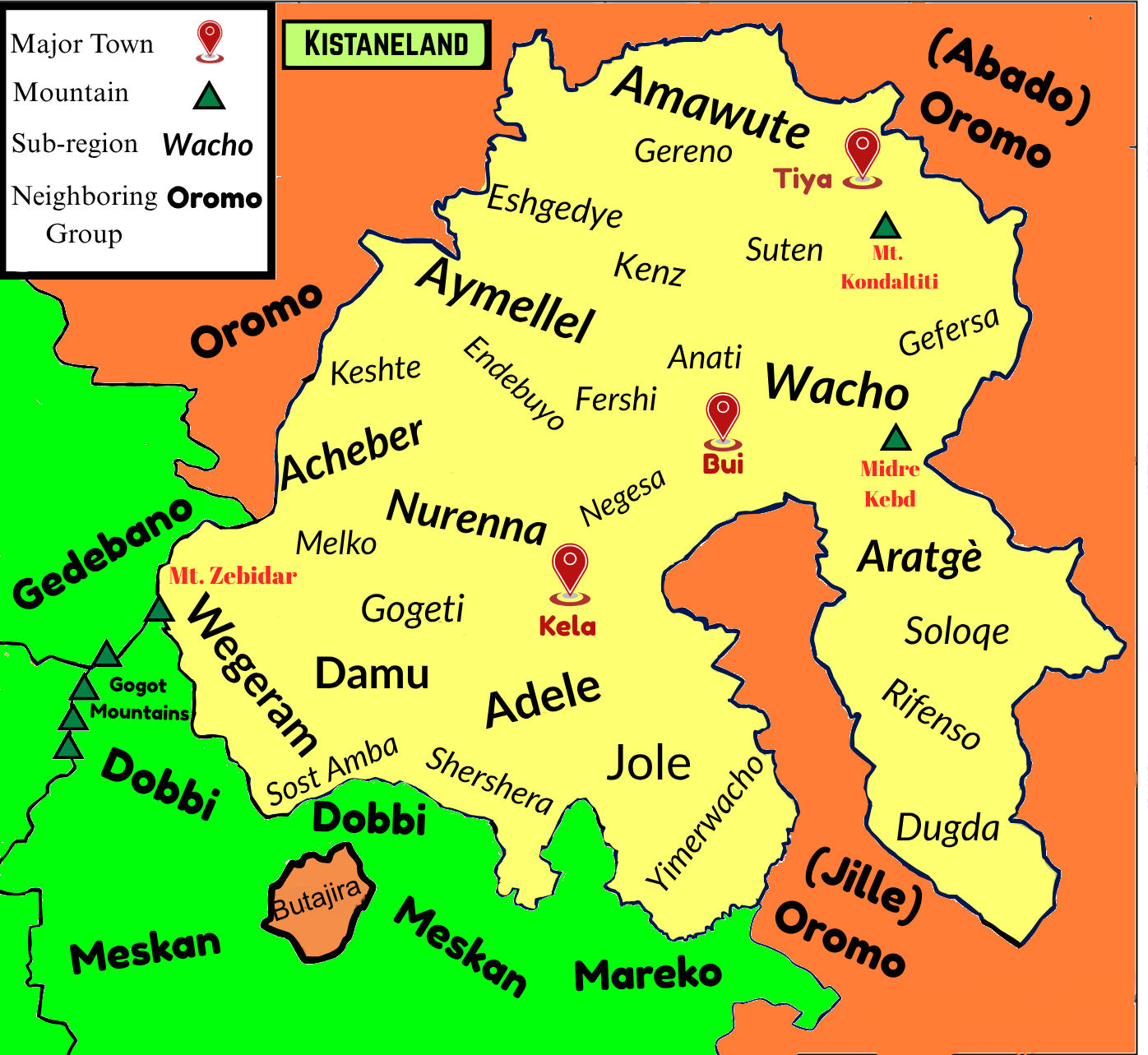
Approximate map of Kistaneland and surrounding regions

The Soddo or Kistane Gurage are related to their fellow Gurages. Geographically, they almost entirely border the Oromo to the North, West, and East. To the south, they border the Dobi-Gogot to the south, the Meskan and Mareqo to the southeast, and to a small degree with the Wolane or Gedebano to the southwest. They historically shared considerable geographic and linguistic polity with the Gafat, now an extinct group, and once encompassed territory that stretched widely to Gojjam and Kingdom of Damot in the west before the incursions of the Oromo migrations.

== History ==
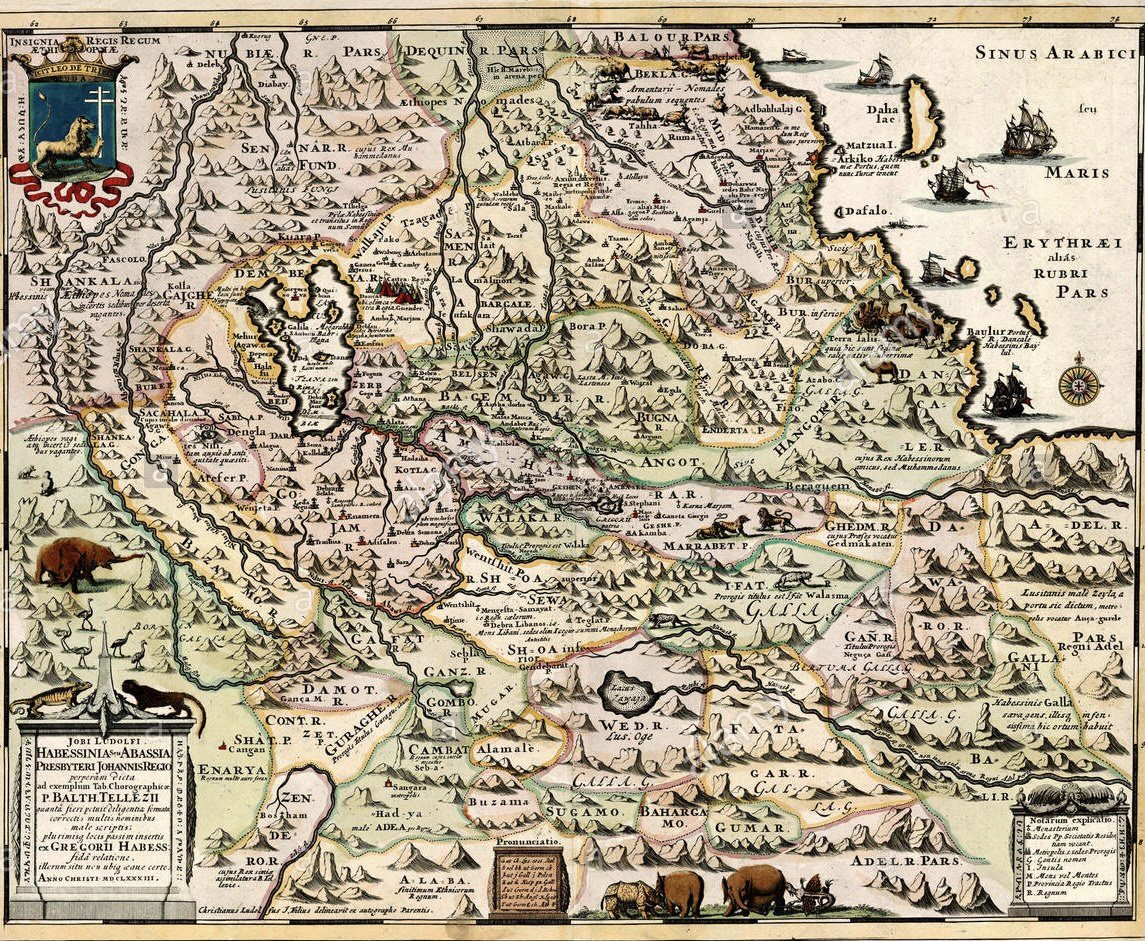
Historic map of Ethiopia, 1684 with kingdom of "Alamale" listed in the bottom

The earliest reference to the Kistane dates back nearly a thousand years to the early twelfth century in the Chronicle of the Sultanate of Showa, written in 1120, where the territories of Kebd (i.e., Midre Kebd) and Mount "Hamilah" (Aymellel) were mentioned as lying amid the conflicts between the Muslim Sultanate and the surrounding Christian kingdoms. The Chronicle of Amde Tsion (written in the early 14th century) listed Aymellel (Alamale) as a district and province that was governed by a Mesfin appointed by the Emperor Amda Seyon (1314–1344), serving at times as a military garrison and settlement by him and future emperors. According to religious traditions and the hagiography of Gebre Menfes Kidus, the saint had evangelized heavily in the area approximately during the 11th century (known as "Kebd" in the Gedl) and is largely credited locally for the early Christianization of the people. One of his surviving legacies is the famous Medre Kebd Abo Monastery, one of the oldest Churches in the then-southern peripheries of the country at the time, alongside Ziqualla, and where he was eventually buried. Saint Tekle Haymanot is also credited with converting populations towards the Butajira area.

Gurage oral traditions recount Aymellel as being the first destination where the expeditions of the mythological Azmach Sebhat arrived, who is said to have been sent by Emperor Amda Seyon to settle in the area in the early 14th century. 19th and 20th-century academics and linguists used the term to identify the Kistane, and it continued to be traditionally referred to as them by other Gurages. However, in the present, "Aymellel" is preserved as being only one of the several sub-groups or Agers consisting of the Soddo Kistane, suggesting that the Aymellel once represented the historically dominant group amongst them before it lost its political significance. Today, the Kistane are primarily divided into and consisted of the following sub-units: Amawute, Wacho, Gereno, Aymellel, Adele, Aygedo, Endebuyo, Keshte, Gemise, Angetge, Aratge, Kenz, Eshgedye, Dugda, Zemute, Melko, Nurenna, Damu, Wogeram, and others. Some Kistane oral sources claim descendence from the north, such as Eritrea, Axum, Gonder, and Bulga. citing their long-standing links with the historical empire to antiquity.

Kistaneland (which the region is sometimes referred to as), is the site of numerous historical sites, such as the monolithic UNESCO World Heritage site Tiya and the similar Gereno staeles. It also contains several historical monasteries such as Medre Kebd Abo, and the monolithic church Adadi Mariam, a testament to the area's strong and long links with Christianity in the area. The Orthodox Faith is an integral cornerstone in the societal structure, morals, culture, and sub-ethnic identity amongst the Christian Kistane, although there is a small but existent Muslim minority. According to religious hagiography, St. Gebre Menfes Kidus built the Medre Kebd Abo monastery in the 11th century, later being buried there. In local tradition, it is said that the brother of Emperor Ezana of Axum, Saizana founded Adadi Mariam in the 4th century, while some date back its construction to the 12th century under the reign of Lalibela (Emperor of Ethiopia) during the Zagwe dynasty. Both of these are major sites of Christian pilgrimage to thousands around the country today. Other significant and ancient Churches include Kondalditi Monastery near Suten, Melko Mariam, and Jugan Balewold.

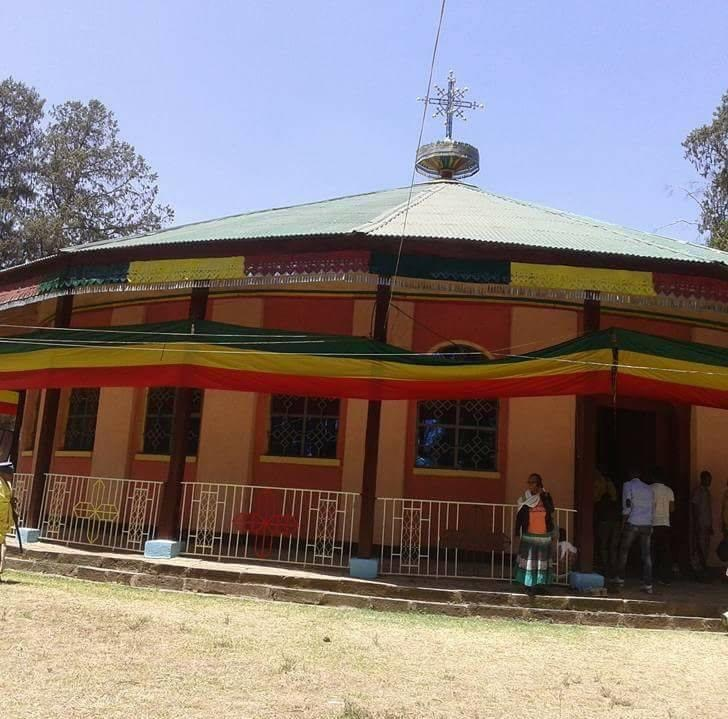
Medre Kebd Abo, 12th century Orthodox Monastery in Sodo woreda, Gurage Zone

That the Kistane's homeland once stretched much further wide is attested in the discoveries of remnants of a Kistane population in Lake Wonchi and the Ambo area known as the Galila when French Explorer Antoine d'Abbadie met with them in Gojjam returning to their home in Wonchi. The Priests identified themselves as Kistane (Christian) Gurages, stating they were led by their hereditary ruler Abegaz Wolle who was constantly at war with the Oromo. Ethnologist Eike Haberland visited the area in 1955 to research further the people who by that time had almost become extinct and were in danger of being assimilated. He also studied the ethnology of the Chebo, another related Gurage people who were already mostly assimilated by the Oromo but whose original name was Kurchase. He noted the Galila and Chebo both were the original inhabitants of the Dandiff mountains in Western Shewa but upon the Oromo migrations, both were forced to be confined in the foothill areas of the mountains and lake edge. Unlike the Chebo, the Galila lived in the higher mountain escarpments and were able to preserve their identity. Haberland agreed with linguist Wolf Leslaus hypothesis of the Kistane language being an extension of Gafat and noted that the presence of the Galila sect of the Kistane in the area, as well as the Kurchase strengthened the argument that the Gurage and Gafat once shared adjacent territories much larger than the land they currently possess. This is further affirmed by Ulrich Braukamper's conclusion of the presence of the Kistane in Waj before the migration of the Hadiya people and the discoveries of Christian relics and artifacts in Mt. Chilalo and the Lake Langano massifs.

During the 15th to 17th centuries, "Aymellel" was listed by some explorers, such as Hiob Ludolf, as an independent district distinct from other Gurages, who were described by some as “Pagans”, in contrast with the Aymellel Christians. By the later centuries, however, for reasons unknown, Aymellel ceased to function as a term applicable to the entirety of the Kistane and was only applied as a geographic term to a district on the mountains west of Bui.

Later in 1841, several subgroups and polities belonging to Christian Gurages (i.e. Kistane) were listed by Ludwig Krapf:

"The Christians are settled in the following places:---1. Aimelelle; 2. Nurreno; 3. Bezanchubu; 4. Manes; 5. Malakdamo; 6. Wogoram; 7. Buiyana; 8. Yudamo; 9. Dachi; 10. Yetanne; 11. Arechat; 12. Heberrer; 13. Arogomane; 14. Dobi; 15. Yawitwi; 16. Yatabona; 17. Zera Zangania; 18. Mohor."

Of these, the most notable belonging to the Sodo Kistane include Aimellele (Aymellel), Nurenno (Nurenna), Buiyana (Buiyema), Wogaram, Dachi and Malakdamo (Damu); while, Heberrer (Sheberrer), Yawitwi (Yawitin), Arechat, Arogame (Argume) are Dobi, Yatabona (Yetebon) belongs to the Meskan and Moher (Muher) are a subgroup of the Sebat Bet which, like the Kistane have been Christian for centuries.

=== Oromo migrations/invasions and impact ===
Oral and written sources list that the locals of Aymellel aided and fought in the armies of the Christian Kingdom in fighting against the invasion of Ahmad ibn Ibrahim al-Ghazi during the Ethiopian-Adal war in the 16th century and were subsequently attacked and ransacked; Midre Kebd Abo, most notably, was burned, and its treasures were looted by Islamic forces. After the Imam's death in 1541 and the Christian Ethiopian state's narrow victory over them however, in the mid-16th century, the Gurage, like much of the rest of the inhabitants of southern Ethiopia, found themselves victims of long-standing invasions, once more, this time from the Oromo. The Oromo migrations, which started somewhere from the south-eastern peripheries of the country near the Kenyan border, began a series of expansions and incursions northwards which would profoundly and permanently affect the demographics of central, western, and southern Ethiopia today. The Gurage, Amhara, Hadiya, and Sidama were the most successful groups to resist the newcomers. The Chronicle of Emperor Susenyos mentions that the Macca Oromo, expanding their way to the Blue Nile basin, were defeated by Gurages and Hadiyas. The geographic location of the Kistane, however, left them more susceptible to Oromo raids and incursions in contrast to their fellow Gurages, and they were not only separated from the mainland but were encircled and forced to endure centuries of aggressions and conflicts with them, as well as to a lesser extent, the Mareqo and Qabena. From the 17th to 19th centuries, they were successful in repulsing and defeating the Oromo, winning many series of battles, although they conceded much of the land in the north. Most of the battles were fought against the Abado, Malima, and Jida clans of the Tulama Oromo, known as the Seden Sodo. Many local heroes, known as Gotas such as Gacho Zage and Yadutu Dugda of Wacho, Bene Dutu of Aratge, Dama Roge of Damu, and many others continue to be hailed and oral stories of their bravery in battle are recited by elders. However, a reversal of fortune for them came around the early 19th century, and the Seden Sodo began enlisting the aid of neighboring Oromo tribes of Jile, Becho, Gimbitchu, and Liben. With their new allies, they became more successful in infiltrating most of the Kistane mainland, with the exception of Wogeram.

“The Galla first broke into Aymallal territory through Ambare Wargo in Nuranna. Then other Aymallal areas, like Gayat, Gareno, Endabuya, and Amawte, were invaded and sacked. The main Galla tribes that invaded Aymallal were the Abado and Malima from the north, both members of the Tulama branch of the Galla, the Geto, and the Dula. Amawte is said to have been invaded by the Abado, Wacho by the Geto, and Aratge by the Dula. Another, less known, tribe, the Jidda, invaded Gareno. Of these tribes, the one most feared was the Abado, with whom the Aymallal had most of their battles."

The overall effect of the Oromo invasion was one of despoliation, depopulation (through either death or flight), and enslavement. The traffic of Gurage slaves substantially increased in the mid-19th century. There are still elders who have memories of grandparents or other such relatives sold into slavery by the Oromo. The invasion and despoliation caused many Kistane villagers to flee and settle in neighboring areas such as Ada, Meqi, Zway, Minjar, and Bulga, facilitating the first mass migrations of the Gurage in other parts of the country. Many Gurages had desperately appealed to Negus Sahle Selassie to protect them from Oromo attacks. Isenburg witnessed Gurage slaves begging at the feet of the King, attesting that when they go to Shewa they are often nearly naked as Oromos frequently ambush and rob them, and the King gifts them new clothes, knowing the raiders would fear angering the King. However, in one major expedition which Sahle Selassie's emissary Germame sent Amhara Neftengna riflemen contingents to aid the Kistane against the Oromo, the battle ended in utter disaster as the riflemen were slaughtered by Oromo cavalry as they were busy trying to reload their weapons. The disaster was lamented by Kistane women.

"A slice of cheese, the Neftegnas are wiped out! Germame, may this fate befall your sons! Lice of the hair, the neftegnas are wiped out, woe to Germame! Alashi's fair one, as he was lying in the valley, his Neftegnas were killed in front of the house of Qare's father. Distressed Milat begged for mercy in the name of the King, thinking there was any order. Wakene Bache killed seven of the Neftegnas, and standing on the belly of his victim and drawing out his sandi, he did what had been done to them."

Many Oromo also peacefully intermarried with the Kistane, with many of the latter speaking the language of the former and adopting Oromo names as well as Amharic names. An example of this was the marriage between the renowned Oromo general Ras Gobana Dacche, who led Menelik's armies in his reconquest over much of the south and western parts of Ethiopia, and his wife Askalech, a Kistane Gurage, who was also the grandmother of Arbegna and Prime Minister Ras Abebe Aregai. The mother of Haile Selassie, Yeshimibet Ali, was the daughter of the Wollo Oromo chief Aba Jiffar Gamcho and his Kistane Gurage wife Wolete-Giorgis, who later became a nun. Many neighboring Oromo tribes were also converted to Orthodox Christianity by Kistane Gurage priests, and in addition to intermarrying and mixing with them, many adopted traditional Gurage customs and cultures. This is most present with the Jida and Abado clans of the Tulama branch, as well as the Geto, who are mostly indistinguishable from them in customs or tradition.

=== Other links and Modern period ===
The Kistane also share long historical and ancestral ties with the Amhara, particularly of Shewa, who share the same Orthodox Christian religious faith, several customs, and speak similar languages. This is further augmented as both belong to the South Ethio-Semitic language branch family and amongst the Gurage dialects, and varieties, the Kistane language is considered to be lexically closest to Amharic. Several clans of the Kistane are recorded to have been descended from Amharas, as well as Tigrayans who fled to escape Gragn's invasions and intermarried with the locals, which is attested by some of their patrilineages (i.e. Fasil, Timhirtemeskel, etc.).

King Sahle Selassie of Shewa, himself also drawn into conflict with the Oromo, responded to a request of the leader and famed military commander of the Kistane, Woda Leliso for military help and an alliance against the Oromo who were growing increasingly aggressive and sent bands of Amhara riflemen to aid them By 1830, he gained the submission of the Kistane leaders Kero and Amino and incorporated them as a tributary state of Shewa, monikering himself as "King of the Gurage". When Menelik II, his grandson, sought to re-expand and conquer the rest of the southern parts of the country in the 1870s, the Kistane submitted peacefully. This allowed them to retain their local political autonomy and spared them from the depredations that other Gurage sub-groups and neighboring peoples who did rebel faced. They were able to live relatively more peacefully throughout the next few decades. However, several Oromo Baleabats (overlords), headed by Ras Gobana Dacce, still ruled over Kistane Gurages in many districts in Kistaneland by force, and many emigrated to various parts of Ethiopia as a result of the despoliation and shrinking of their homeland, which they were confined in and became unable to sustain their population.

Upon the foundation of Addis Ababa, many Kistane Gurages emigrated to the newly founded Addis Abeba, becoming the first pioneers of the Gurages to establish themselves in the new capital and greatly contributing to the labor work and construction in it. The Kistanes are regarded as the first among the Gurage to establish Merkato and replace the Arabs and Armenians as the dominant economic class. Amongst these, Memire Woldeyes, Molla Maru, Gulilat Woldeyes, and Zemzem Gerbie are known as the first entrepreneurs of Merkato who paved the way for Gurage entrepreneurism in Addis Ababa as popularly known today. Land-wise, Shewan aristocratic, and Kistane sources recite that Emperor Menelik granted the Kistane land in the district of Geja in Addis Abeba, being the first area where they historically settled, and encouraged them to live there. However, Kistane Gurages in the newly founded city faced several challenges, particularly from the Shewan aristocracy. After the death of Fitawrari Habte-Giyorgis, they were often harassed and targeted by aristocratic administrators such as Fitawrari Gebre and Fitawrari Endaylu, who attempted to steal their land and expel them. Many but not all of the aristocratic class resented the wealth the Gurage entrepreneurs obtained. The Kistane also were targeted for Leba-Shay, a thief-detecting system in which a young boy would be induced into a frenzy by a hallucinogenic drug, and would lead the police to the house of the thief. Many aristocratic officials intentionally led the leba-shay to Gurage homes specifically, regardless of their innocence or guilt. Several more challenges continued to persist until Emperor Haile Selassie put a stop to them.

During the Fascist Italian Invasion of Ethiopia in 1935-1941, Kistane Gurages areas were the centre of heavy Arbegnoch resistance against the Italians, which themselves were consisted of many Kistane Arbegnoch, including Shaleqa Bekele Weya, Dejazmatch Gebremariam Gari, Merdasa Geda, and Lakech Demisew. The Battle of Gogetti, in which Dejazmatch Gebremariam Gari was killed, and Ras Desta Damtew was forced to retreat following mustard gas deployment, was located in the district of Gogetti, which continued to serve as a basin for Arbegnoch resistance until Italy's final defeat in 1941.

The Alemgena-Welayta Road Construction Association was founded predominantly by the Kistane in 1961, providing a source of labor, employment opportunities, and communal identity for new young emigrants who migrated to Addis. After the overthrow of Haile Selassie and the imperial regime in 1974, a communist regime under the Derg replaced it. Under the new Marxist-inspired land system, many Gurage landowners had their land forcibly expropriated by the ruling regime and were further pushed to urban centers to accumulate their wealth. In 1991, after the overthrow of the Derg and the ascendance of the EPRDF, a new ethnic-based federalist system was introduced. Many Oromo politicians pushed for the Kistane Gurage to identify as Oromo and to join the Oromia region as opposed to the SNNPR region. When they refused, proponents of several Oromo-based political parties and movements such as the OLF (Oromo Liberation Front), IFLO (Islamic Front for the Liberation of the Oromo), and the OPDO intimidated, destroyed properties in the Sodo Kistane region and used violence to threaten communities who did not align with them. In response, proponents of the Kistane Gurage angrily countered and formed a separate coalition called the Soddo Gordena Democratic Action.

== Language ==
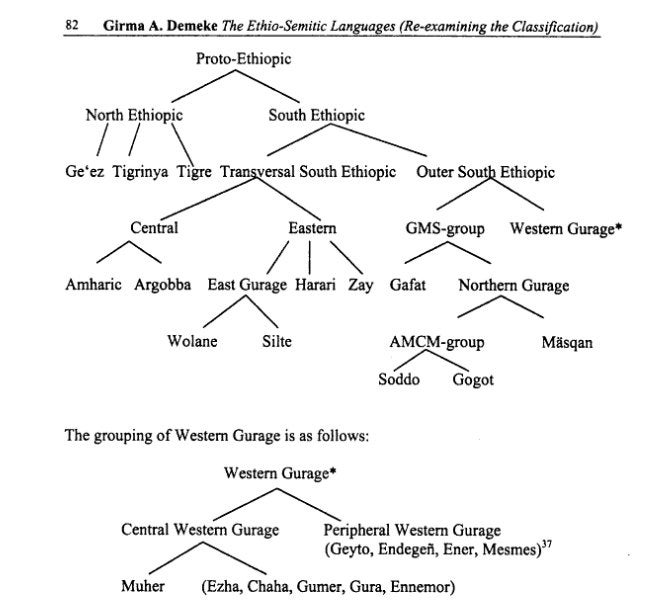
A visual diagram of the distributions of Ethio-Semitic languages

The Soddo language, also known traditionally and locally as Kistanigna, is one of the Gurage languages from the Northern group, which is classified as one of the clusters of South Ethio-Semitic. Within the South Ethio-Semitic, it is branched under the Gunnangn Branch of Gurage languages. It is not generally mutually intelligible with the West Gurage or East Gurage languages, although there are varying degrees of intelligibility with certain dialects/varieties. Amongst the Gurage, Kistane is generally considered closest to Amharic. It shares a 76/90% mutualistic comprehensibility with the closely related Dobi, as well as sharing considerable affinity with the Meskane language. It is also closely related to the now-extinct Gafat language, which was spoken in present-day Welega and Gojjam.

== Communal laws and organization ==
Unlike their neighbors to the north, the Gurage did not traditionally practice a structured monarchial system and thus lacked centralized authority or definitive autocratic rulers. Instead, they politically organized in communal systems of governance which were governed by several local respective chiefs. The system of governance of the Soddo Kistane is known as Ye Gordena Sera which is also shared with the Gedebeno, while the Sebat Bet practice the Yejoka Kicha, the Dobi practice the Ye Sinano Sera, and the Meskan Ye Feresgena Sera.

The Gordena, which's literary etymology is based on the wooden pillars of a traditional home, was thought to have been founded in a district called Enjeri in the Nurena area and is often referred to interchangeably as that (i.e. Ye Enjeri Sera). It contrasts with the Sebat Bet Gurage which practices the similar Yajoka Kicha. Like the Sebat Bet, the Sodo Kistane is composed of several agnatic descent groups, numbering more than 280. However, in contrast to the former, these descent groups play a lesser role in societal formation and family structure, and the latter are instead primarily based on territoriality rather than genealogical lineages and clans. These subdivisions are known in the Kistane as Agers. Within each Ager are dozens of smaller territorial and familial units called Sebuggnets, which formed the basis of the formation of Equb and Eddirs in Addis Ababa.

The circumstances that led to the uniting of these agers and the establishment of the Gordena were the presence of both internal and external threats; the long territorial disputes between the warring "agers", in addition to the external threat of the Hadiya i.e. Qabena, Mareko, and later the Oromo, which facilitated the development of a united system to combat them. The Sera system is not limited to the Gurage however but also to the Wolayta, Sidama, and Gamo people, who all practice similar forms of governance and political structures and who all consume and practice the Enset lifestyle culture.

== Notable individuals ==
- Teddy Afro, national artist and singer

- Bahru Zewde , Professor, Ethiopian Historian and Author

- Dr. Fekadu Gedamu , Ethiopian Social Anthropologist and Ambassadors

- Sebsebe Demissew , Professor and Ethiopian botanical scientist

- Zemzem Gerbie , Entrepreneur and business woman

- General Yilma Shibeshi , Chief of national police

- Aster Aweke, national artist and singer

- Abinet Agonafer, singer

- Abonesh Adinew, singer

- Minalush Reta, singer

- Argaw Bedaso, singer

- Elias Melka, song composer and songwriter

- Dejazmach Balcha Safo, war commander, dejazmach, governor

- Dejazmach Gebremariam Gari, war commander, governor

- Dejazmach Geresu Duki. war commander

- Dejazmach Bekele Weya, war commander

- Getaneh Kebede, professional athlete

- Geremew Denboba, professional athlete
