= Zay =

Zay may refer to:

- Zay people, an ethnic group of Ethiopia
- Zay language, a language of Ethiopia
- Zay (name), a list of people and fictional characters with the nickname, given name or surname
- Zay (river), Tatarstan, Russian Federation
- Zay or Zainsk Reservoir, Tatarstan, Russian Federation
- Arabic letter zāy ز
- zay, ISO 639-3 code for the Zayse-Zergulla language spoken in Ethiopia

== See also ==
- Zai (disambiguation)
- Zey, Adıyaman, Turkey, a village
