= Chaha language =

Semitic language of Ethiopia

Chaha
- ቸሃ
- Native to: Ethiopia
- Native speakers: (undated figure of 130,000)
- Language family: Afro-Asiatic: Semitic; West Semitic; South Semitic; Ethiopic; South; West Gurage; Sebat Bet; Chaha
- Writing system: Ge'ez script

Language codes
- ISO 639-3: –
- Glottolog: chah1248

Chaha or Cheha (in Chaha and Amharic: ቸሃ čehā or čexā) is a Sebat bet Gurage dialect spoken in central Ethiopia, mainly within the Gurage Zone in the Southern Nations, Nationalities and Peoples Region. It is also spoken by Gurage settlers in Ethiopian cities, especially Addis Ababa. Chaha is known to many phonologists and morphologists for its very complex morphophonology.

== Speakers ==
According to Ethnologue, the dialects of SBG (Sebat Bet Gurage) are Chaha (čäxa), Ezha (äža), Gumer (or Gwemare, gʷämarä), Gura, Gyeto (or Gyeta, gʸäta), and Muher (or Mwahr, mʷäxǝr). However, some of these are sometimes considered languages in their own right. In particular, Muher diverges so much from the other dialects that it is not necessarily even treated as a member of the Western Gurage group to which SBG belongs.

This article focuses on the Chaha dialect, which has been studied more than the others. Unless otherwise indicated, all examples are Chaha.

== Sounds and orthography ==
=== Consonants and vowels ===
SBG has a fairly typical set of phonemes for an Ethiopian Semitic language. There is the usual set of ejective consonants as well as plain voiceless and voiced consonants. However, the Chaha language also has a larger set of palatalized and labialized consonants than most other Ethiopian Semitic languages. Besides the typical seven vowels of these languages, SBG has open-mid front (ɛ) and back vowels (ɔ). Some of the dialects have both short and long vowel phonemes, and some have nasalized vowels.

The charts below show the phones of the Chaha dialect; exactly how many phonemes there are is a matter of controversy because of the complexity of SBG morphophonology. For the representation of SBG sounds, this article uses a modification of a system that is common (though not universal) among linguists who work on Ethiopian Semitic languages, but it differs somewhat from the conventions of the International Phonetic Alphabet. When the non-IPA symbol is different, it is indicated in brackets in the charts.

Consonants
		Labial		Dental	Post- alveolar	Palatal	Velar		Glottal
		plain	round	Dental	Post- alveolar	Palatal	plain	round	Glottal
Nasal		m	mʷ	n		ɲ ⟨ñ⟩			
Plosive/ Affricate	voiced	b	bʷ	d	d͡ʒ ⟨ǧ⟩	ɟ ⟨gʸ⟩	g	ɡʷ	
Plosive/ Affricate	voiceless	p	pʷ	t	t͡ʃ ⟨č⟩	c ⟨kʸ⟩	k	kʷ	
Plosive/ Affricate	ejective			tʼ ⟨ṭ⟩	t͡ʃʼ ⟨č̣⟩	cʼ ⟨ḳʸ⟩	kʼ ⟨ḳ⟩	kʼʷ ⟨ḳʷ⟩	
Fricative	voiced			z	ʒ ⟨ž⟩				
Fricative	voiceless	f	fʷ	s	ʃ ⟨š⟩	ç ⟨xʸ⟩	x	xʷ	h
Approximant		β̞		l		j ⟨y⟩		w	
Rhotic				r					

Vowels
	Front	Central	Back
High	i	ɨ ⟨ə⟩	u
High-mid	e	ə ⟨ä⟩	o
Low-mid	ɛ	ə ⟨ä⟩	ɔ
Low		a	

=== Morphophonology ===
In addition to the complexity in verb morphology characteristic of all Semitic languages, SBG exhibits another level of complexity because of the intricate relationship between the set of consonants in the root of a verb and how they are realized in a particular form of that verb or a noun derived from that verb. For example, the verb meaning 'open' has a root consisting of the consonants {kft} (as it does in most other Ethiopian Semitic languages). In some forms we see all of these consonants. For example, the third person singular masculine perfective Chaha form meaning 'he opened' is käfätä-m. However, when the impersonal of this same verb is used, meaning roughly 'he was opened', two of the stem consonants are changed: 'käfʷäč-i-m'.

At least three different phonological processes play a role in SBG morphophonology.

==== Devoicing and "gemination" ====
In most Ethiopian Semitic languages, gemination, that is, consonant lengthening, plays a role in distinguishing words from one another and in the grammar of verbs.

For example, in Amharic, the second consonant of a three-consonant verb root is doubled in the perfective: {sdb} 'insult', säddäbä 'he insulted'. In Chaha and some other SBG dialects (but not Ezha or Muher), gemination is replaced by devoicing. For example, the verb root meaning 'insult' is the same in SBG as in Amharic (with b replaced by β), but in the perfective the second consonant becomes t in the non-geminating dialects: sätäβä-m 'he insulted'.

Only voiced consonants can be devoiced: b/β → p, d → t, g → k, bʷ → pʷ, ǧ → č, gʸ → kʸ, gʷ → kʷ, z → s, ž → š.

The "devoiced/geminated" form of r is n. Other voiced consonants are not devoiced.

==== Labialization ====
Several morphological processes cause consonants to be labialized (rounded). For example, from the three-consonant verb root {gkr} 'be straight', there is the derived adjective gʷǝkʷǝr 'straight'.

Labial and velar consonants can be labialized: p → pʷ, b → bʷ, β → w, f → fʷ, k → kʷ, ḳ → ḳʷ, g → gʷ, x → xʷ.

==== Palatalization, depalatalization ====
Several morphological processes cause consonants to be palatalized. For example, the second-person feminine singular form of verbs in the imperfective and jussive/imperative palatalizes one of the root consonants (if one is palatalizable): {kft} 'open', tǝkäft 'you (m.) open', tǝkäfč 'you (f.) open'.

Dental and velar consonants can be palatalized: t → č, ṭ → č̣, d → ǧ, s → š, z → ž, k → kʸ, ḳ → ḳʸ, g → gʸ, x → xʸ.

r palatalizes to y.

In one morphological environment the reverse process takes place. In the imperative/jussive form of one class of verbs, the first consonant in the root is depalatalized if this is possible. For example, the verb meaning 'return' (transitive) has the stem consonants {žpr} in other forms, for example, žäpärä-m 'he returned', but the ž is depalatalized to z in the imperative zäpǝr 'return! (m.)'.

=== Allophones ===
The relationship among n, r, and l is complex. At least within verb stems, [n] and [r] may be treated as allophones of a single phoneme. The consonant is realized as [n] at the beginning of the word, when this is a "gemination" environment, and when it ends the penultimate syllable of the word. [r] appears otherwise.

- nämädä-m 'he liked', tä-rämädä-m 'he was liked'
- yǝ-βära 'he eats', bäna-m 'he ate' ("geminated")
- sǝräpätä-m 'he spent some time', wä-sämbǝt 'to spend some time' (the n becomes m because of the following b)

Banksira also argues that k is an allophone of x and b an allophone of β.

=== Orthography ===
Chaha is transcribed using the Ge'ez (Ethiopic) writing system. It was originally developed for the now-extinct Ge'ez language, and now serves as the orthography for Amharic and Tigrinya. Although there are still relatively few texts in the language, three novels have appeared in the Chaha dialect (by Sahlä Səllase and Gäbräyäsus Haylämaryam).

To represent the palatalized consonants not found in Ge'ez, Amharic, or Tigrinya, modified characters were introduced to the script, such as using wedges on the tops. The original use of this was done in the New Testament published by the Ethiopian Bible Society, then for the entire Bible; it has now become generally adopted.

Chaha syllabary
	ä [ə]	u	i	a	e	ə [ɨ]	o	ʷä [ʷə]	ʷi	ʷa	ʷe	ʷə [ʷɨ]
x	ኸ	ኹ	ኺ	ኻ	ኼ	ኽ	ኾ	ዀ	ዂ	ዃ	ዄ	ዅ
xʸ	ⷐ	ⷑ	ⷒ	ⷓ	ⷔ	ⷕ	ⷖ					
l	ለ	ሉ	ሊ	ላ	ሌ	ል	ሎ					
m	መ	ሙ	ሚ	ማ	ሜ	ም	ሞ	ᎀ	ᎁ	ሟ	ᎂ	ᎃ
r	ረ	ሩ	ሪ	ራ	ሬ	ር	ሮ					
s	ሰ	ሱ	ሲ	ሳ	ሴ	ስ	ሶ					
š	ሸ	ሹ	ሺ	ሻ	ሼ	ሽ	ሾ					
ḳ	ቀ	ቁ	ቂ	ቃ	ቄ	ቅ	ቆ	ቈ	ቊ	ቋ	ቌ	ቍ
ḳʸ	ⷀ	ⷁ	ⷂ	ⷃ	ⷄ	ⷅ	ⷆ					
b	በ	ቡ	ቢ	ባ	ቤ	ብ	ቦ	ᎄ	ᎅ	ቧ	ᎆ	ᎇ
β	ቨ	ቩ	ቪ	ቫ	ቬ	ቭ	ቮ					
t	ተ	ቱ	ቲ	ታ	ቴ	ት	ቶ					
č	ቸ	ቹ	ቺ	ቻ	ቼ	ች	ቾ					
n	ነ	ኑ	ኒ	ና	ኔ	ን	ኖ					
ñ	ኘ	ኙ	ኚ	ኛ	ኜ	ኝ	ኞ					
ʾ	ኧ	ኡ	ኢ	አ	ኤ	እ	ኦ					
k	ከ	ኩ	ኪ	ካ	ኬ	ክ	ኮ	ኰ	ኲ	ኳ	ኴ	ኵ
kʸ	ⷈ	ⷉ	ⷊ	ⷋ	ⷌ	ⷍ	ⷎ					
w	ወ	ዉ	ዊ	ዋ	ዌ	ው	ዎ					
z	ዘ	ዙ	ዚ	ዛ	ዜ	ዝ	ዞ					
ž	ዠ	ዡ	ዢ	ዣ	ዤ	ዥ	ዦ					
y	የ	ዩ	ዪ	ያ	ዬ	ይ	ዮ					
d	ደ	ዱ	ዲ	ዳ	ዴ	ድ	ዶ					
ǧ	ጀ	ጁ	ጂ	ጃ	ጄ	ጅ	ጆ					
g	ገ	ጉ	ጊ	ጋ	ጌ	ግ	ጎ	ጐ	ጒ	ጓ	ጔ	ጕ
gʸ	ⷘ	ⷙ	ⷚ	ⷛ	ⷜ	ⷝ	ⷞ					
ṭ	ጠ	ጡ	ጢ	ጣ	ጤ	ጥ	ጦ					
č̣	ጨ	ጩ	ጪ	ጫ	ጬ	ጭ	ጮ					
p̣	ጰ	ጱ	ጲ	ጳ	ጴ	ጵ	ጶ					
ṣ	ፀ	ፁ	ፂ	ፃ	ፄ	ፅ	ፆ					
f	ፈ	ፉ	ፊ	ፋ	ፌ	ፍ	ፎ	ᎈ	ᎉ	ፏ	ᎊ	ᎋ
p	ፐ	ፑ	ፒ	ፓ	ፔ	ፕ	ፖ	ᎌ	ᎍ	ፗ	ᎎ	ᎏ
	ä [ə]	u	i	a	e	ə [ɨ]	o	ʷä [ʷə]	ʷi	ʷa	ʷe	ʷə [ʷɨ]

== See also ==
- Inor – Another Western Gurage language.
- Soddo – A Northern Gurage language.
- Zay and Silt'e – Eastern Gurage languages.
- Gurage
