= Zai =

Zai may refer to:

- Democratic Republic of the Congo, formerly Zaire, ongoing UNDP code ZAI
- Zaï, an off-season farming technique to collect water and nutrients from compost, to restore degraded drylands and increase soil fertility
- Zai (surname) (宰), a Chinese surname
- Zai (suffix), suffix denoting a member of certain Pashtun tribes
- Zai, Palghar, a village in Maharashtra, India
- Zväz autorov a interprétov populárnej hudby (Union of Authors and Performers, ZAI), a presenter of the ZAI Awards
- Zaire, a former state in Africa
- Zayin, a letter of many Semitic abjads
- Isthmus Zapotec (ISO 639-3: zai), a Zapotecan language of Mexico

== Given names ==
- Li Zai (died 1343), Chinese painter
- Wang Zai, Chinese general of the Tang Dynasty
- Yuan Zai (died 777), Chinese noble, Chancellor of the Tang Dynasty
- Zhang Zai (1020–1077), Chinese philosopher and cosmologist
- Zai Bennett, Television executive
- Zai Fundo (1899–1944), Albanian journalist and writer

== See also ==
- Zay (disambiguation)
- Zae (disambiguation)
