= Gafat people =

Extinct ethnic group of Ethiopia

Gafat
Regions with significant populations

Languages
- Gafat

Religion
- Pagan, Christianity?

The Gafat people (Amharic: ጋፋት) are an extinct ethnic group that were once inhabited along the Blue Nile in Ethiopia, and later, pushed south of Gojjam in what is now East Welega Zone. They spoke the Gafat language, an extinct South Ethiopic grouping within the Semitic subfamily of the Afroasiatic languages and closely related to Harari and Eastern Gurage languages. According to Alaqa Taye, in the year 1922 Gafat was only spoken privately in Gojjam due to the Amhara designating them outcasts.

== Etymology ==
According to Giorgio Banti a few linguists have postulated Gafat is an extract from the root Harari term Gáfá meaning "slave."

== History ==
Gafat was located just within the kingdom of Damot to the north upper Gibe River and bordered directly on southern bank of the Blue Nile. Like near by Damot, Gafat is reported in the Gedle Yared to have come under Zagwe rule in the 12th century and Tekle Haymanot accomplished his mission as well. Gafat on both side of the Nile appeared to have kept them in great numbers. According to Alaqa Taye Gabra Mariam, the people were engaged in craftsmanship as an occupation.

The thirteenth century Amhara rebel leader Yekuno Amlak was supported by Gafat Malassay in the decisive Battle of Ansata against the Zagwe dynasty. In the reign of Yeshaq I (1412-1417), a number of Gafat communities such as Malägwe, Abdaray, and Harbäwaš south of the Nile paid tribute in the cattle.

Alëqa Täkla-Iyyäsus Waq Jira, the author of the Gojjam chronicle, whom he considered the early inhabitation and direct ancestors of Gojjamis were the Gafat prior to their expulsions by the Amhara leader Susenyos I in and round Mugar River. Argument has been made that the Gafat have assimilated into the Amhara identity.

The arrival of Oromo between the upper Gibe and the Blue Nile probably pushed the people of Gafat in to south Gojjam in between 1574 and 1606. Encyclopaedia Aethiopica states Gafat who on the left side of Blue Nile escaped Oromo by crossing Blue Nile and settling there. James Bruce, in his travels, described their cattle from Oromo raids in the Bêrr Valley of Gojjam and numerous beautiful cattle of the Gafat who were settled in the plains of Aĉäfär up to foothills of the Säkäla mountains. A manuscript from the early twentieth century named "Yii Gojjam Tetuled" indicates that Gafat were present in the Ifat region.

It is not clear how and when the Gafat were converted to Christianity. However, by the time the ancient time laws were reformed, the Gafat society in Pârâbe and Sârâbe appears to have become Christian. According to päräbe and särabe laws a recognition of the important of the crafts in the life of society is further indicated by the imposition of what must have been a crippling penalty on those who use pejorative terms in reference to craftsmen and artisans (CLGP28). The practice of shunning, crafts man and artisans by highland agrarian communities who specialized in such profession consider as Buda. Less affected by cohabitation, intermarriage, religious, coercion, and assimilation. The Buda belief suggest that the Buda are the symbolic expression of the latent consequences of unmediated equal status relation between man and woman.

== See also ==
- Gafat Armament Engineering Complex, a military production facility for Ethiopian National Defense Force
- Gaturi people, an extinct ethnic group in eastern Ethiopia
