= Sagwora =

Ethiopian healer

A Sägwora is a healer of the Gurage people of Ethiopia. One visits a Sagwora when suffering from an illness believed to be caused by evil spirits.

The Sägwora then prescribes a remedy to rid the person of the spirit. Often this includes the sacrifice of a sheep of a particular colour. The flesh of the sacrificed animal is then eaten by the relatives of the sick as well as others that are present at the ceremony. This type of exorcism is not always permanent, however, but it does allow the affected to develop a "friendly" relationship with the possessing spirit.
