= Muher language =

Semitic language of Ethiopia

Muher
- Region: Ethiopia
- Native speakers: (undated figure of 90,000)
- Language family: Afro-Asiatic: Semitic; West Semitic; South Semitic; Ethiopic; South; West Gurage; Muher
- Writing system: Ge'ez script

Language codes
- ISO 639-3: sgw
- Glottolog: seba1251

Muher (Muxar) is an Ethiopian Semitic language belonging to the Gurage group. It is spoken in the mountains north of Cheha and Ezhana Wolene in Ethiopia. The language has two dialects, which are named after the first-person singular pronoun "I" they use: Ana uses əni/anä, Adi uses adi/ädi (similar to the related language Soddo). The language is sometimes written in a modified Arabic (Ajam) or Amharic script. It has approximately 90,000 speakers.

== Phonology ==
Consonant Phonemes in Muher
		Labial		Alveolar	Palatal		Velar/Glottal	
		Plain	Rounded	Alveolar	Sibilant	Non-sibilant	Plain	Rounded
Stop	Voiceless			t	t͡ʃ	c	k	kʷ
Stop	Voiced	b	bʷ	d	d͡ʒ	ɟ	g	gʷ
Stop	Ejective			tʼ		cʼ	kʼ	kʼʷ
Fricative	Voiceless	f	fʷ	s	ʃ	ç	h	hʷ
Fricative	Voiced			z	ʒ			
Nasal		m	mʷ	n		ɲ		
Trill				r				
Approximant				l		j		w

The phonemic status of the glottal stop is uncertain. In some cases, /kʼ/ or /kʷ/ may be reduced to [ʔ] or [ʔʷ], respectively, postvocalically.

Vowel Phonemes in Muher
	Front	Central	Back
Close	i		u
Mid	e	ɨ (ə) ɑ̈ (ɜ)	o
Open		ɑ	

The basic syllable structure of Muher is C(C)V(C)(C)

== Grammar ==
Like many Semitic languages, Muher has triconsonantal roots for verbs and nominals.

Personal pronouns both substitute for subjects and function as possessive suffixes on nominals.

	Gender	Singular		Plural	
	Gender	Pronoun	Possessive	Pronoun	Possessive
1	Common	ɑ̈di	-ddi	ɨɲɲɑ	-nnɑ
2	Male	(-)dɑ̈-hɑ̈		(-)dɑ̈-hɨmʷ	
2	Female	(-)dä-ç (<*dähʲ)		(-)dɑ̈-hmɑ	
3	Male	hʷɑ	-hʷt(ɑ)	(-)hinnɑ̈mʷ	
3	Female	(-)çɑ/(-)hijɑ		(-)hinnɑ̈mɑ	

Definiteness is marked by the definite suffix -we.

Muher has a decimal number system. The teens are formed by ɑsrɑ̈- plus the digits, usually preceded by -m.

Numerals
Digit	Gloss
ɑtt/kʼunɑ	'one'
hʷett	'two'
sɔɑst/sost	'three'
ɑrbɑ̈tt	'four'
ɑmmɨst	'five'
sɨddɨst	'six'
sɑ̈bɑ̈tt/sɑ̈bɑtt	'seven'
simmutt	'eight'
ʒɑ̈tʼɑ̈	'nine'
ɑssir/ɑsrɑ̈	'ten'

=== Verbs ===
The basic word order of Muher is SOV. However, a known argument always has to precede a new argument, regardless of their function. Primary conjugations differentiate between the perfective and imperfective aspects. The subject and object are marked on the verb. Object markers are divided into the categories Light and Heavy. Heavy object markers are those who occur with impersonal and plural subjects. Light markers are any others. Light markers may differ based on if the aspect is perfective or non-perfective.

Object Markers
Object Marker	Light		Heavy
Object Marker	Perfective	Non-perfective	Heavy
1SG	-e	-e	-rɨ
2SG MASC	-nnɑhɑ̈	-hɑ̈	-kkɑ̈
2SG FEM	-nnɑç	-ç	-kc
3SG MASC	-nn	-ʷ/-nn	-ʲ/-ʷ (-c)
3SG FEM	-nnɑ	-ːɑ/-nnɑ	-jɑ/-wɑ (-cɑ)
1PL	-(ɑ̈)nɑ̈	-ɑ̈nɑ̈	-nnɑ̈
2PL MASC	-nnɑhmʷ	-hɨmʷ	-kkɨmʷ
2PL FEM	-nnɑhmɑ	-hmɑ	-kkimɑ
3PL MASC	-nnɑ̈mʷ	-ːɑ̈mʷ/-nnɑ̈mʷ	-jɑ̈mʷ/-wɑ̈mʷ (-cɑ̈mʷ)
3PL FEM	-nnɑ̈mɑ	-ːɑ̈mɑ/-nnɑ̈mɑ	-jɑ̈mɑ/-wɑ̈mɑ (-cɑ̈mɑ)
