= Zay (name) =

Zay is a given name and a surname. It may refer to:

== People ==
=== Given name ===
- Zay Jeffries (1888–1965), American mining engineer and metallurgist
- Zay Khay Sheen (1894–1922), Indian poet and writer born Zahida Khatun Sherwani
- Zay N. Smith (1949–2020), American newspaper columnist and author
- Zay Thiha, Burmese businessman
- Zay Ye Htet (fl. 2010–present), Burmese actor, model and producer
- Zay Zay Htut (born 1983), Burmese painter

=== Nickname ===
- Zay Flowers (born 2000), American football player
- Zay Harding (born 1974), American television personality
- Zay Jones (born 1995), American football player

=== Surname ===
- Adele Zay (1848–1928), Transylvanian teacher and feminist
- Andy Zay, American businessman and politician elected in 2016 to the Indiana Senate
- Anna Zay (1680–1733), Hungarian writer
- Gözde Zay, Turkish fashion model
- Jean Zay (1904–1944), French politician
- William Zay, American baseball player who pitched one game in 1886

== Fictional characters ==
- Zay Babineaux, in the television series Girl Meets World
- Zay, in Star Wars Battlefront II (2017 video game)
