= Mesmes language =

Extinct Semitic language of Ethiopia

Mesmes
- Native to: Ethiopia
- Ethnicity: Mesmes
- Extinct: 2000s, with the death of Abegaz
- Language family: Afro-Asiatic: Semitic; West Semitic; South Semitic; Southwestern Semitic; Ethiopic; South; Outer South; West Gurage; Inor; Mesmes

Language codes
- ISO 639-3: mys
- Glottolog: mesm1243
- ELP: Mesmes

The Mesmes language is an extinct West Gurage language, one of the Ethiopian Semitic languages spoken in Ethiopia. There are still many people who claim the Mesmes ethnic identity, but none who speak the language. The last speaker of the language, named Abegaz, was interviewed by a language survey team when he was approximately 80 years old. He had not spoken the language for 30 years, having nobody to speak it with since his brother died.

The Mesmes have shifted to speaking the Hadiyya language. However, they still maintain some cultural distinctives, including their own style of house architecture.

The comparative method has shown that the language is most closely related to the Inor variety of Gurage.

A study of the phonology of Mesmes has shown evidence of rhinoglottophilia.

== Vocabulary ==
Mesmes vocabulary
gloss	Mesmes
I	hiyya
thou	ahâ
we	îna
