= Mesqan language =

Semitic language of Ethiopia

Mesqan
- Mäsqan
- Native to: Ethiopia
- Region: Gurage Zone
- Native speakers: 200,000 (2007)
- Language family: Afro-Asiatic: Semitic; West Semitic; South Semitic; Ethiopic; South; Outer South; West Gurage; Mesqan
- Writing system: Ge'ez script

Language codes
- ISO 639-3: mvz
- Glottolog: mesq1240

Mesqan (also Mäsqan or Meskan) is an Afro-Asiatic language spoken by the Gurage people in the Gurage Zone of Ethiopia. It belongs to the family's Ethiopian Semitic branch.

== Phonology ==
=== Consonants ===
		Labial		Alveolar	Post- alveolar	Palatal	Velar		Glottal
		plain	lab.	Alveolar	Post- alveolar	Palatal	plain	lab.	Glottal
Nasal		m	mʷ	n		ɲ			
Stop/ Affricate	voiceless	(p)		t	t͡ʃ	c	k	kʷ	
Stop/ Affricate	voiced	b	bʷ	d	d͡ʒ	ɟ	g	ɡʷ	
Stop/ Affricate	ejective	(pʼ)		tʼ	t͡ʃʼ	cʼ	kʼ	kʼʷ	
Fricative	voiceless	f	fʷ	s	ʃ	ç	x	xʷ	h
Fricative	voiced	(v)		z	ʒ				
Fricative	ejective			(sʼ)					
Rhotic				r					
Lateral				l					
Approximant						j	w		

- Sounds /p, pʼ, v, sʼ/ occur in loanwords, mainly from Amharic.
- /xʷ/ may also have an allophone of [hʷ].
- /b/ may have an allophone of [β] in postvocalic and intervocalic positions.
- /n/ may assimilate to [ŋ] when following a velar consonant.
- /k, ɡ/ can also be heard as palatalized [kʲ, ɡʲ] when before front vowels.

=== Vowels ===
	Front	Central	Back
Close	i	ɨ	u
Mid	e	ə	o
Open		a	
