= Rhinoglottophilia =

Phonetic phenomenon

Nasalized and glottalized

◌̰̃

In phonetics, rhinoglottophilia is the connection between laryngeal (glottal) and nasal articulations. The term was coined by James A. Matisoff in 1975.

There is a connection between the acoustic production of laryngeals and nasals, as can be seen from the antiformants both can produce when viewed via a spectrogram. This is because both sounds in a sense have branched resonators: in the production of nasal sound, both the oral cavity and the nasal cavity act as resonators. For laryngeals, the space below the glottis acts as a second resonator, which in turn can produce slight antiformants.

In Krim, a language without contrastive nasal vowels, vowels are nonetheless strongly nasalized after /h/. A similar correspondence occurs after /h/ and /ʔ/ in Pirahã. It is also attested in some varieties of American English, such as [hɑ̃ːvəd] for Harvard by the Kennedys.

Rhinoglottophilia may have occurred historically in the development of Inor, one of the Gurage languages. Inor has nasal vowels, unusual for a Gurage language, and in many cases these occur where the language etymologically had a pharyngeal or laryngeal consonant. Rhinoglottophilia has been documented elsewhere in Gurage, also. Similar processes have also been reported for Irish, Basque, North-Central Hlai and in Nyole, where Bantu *p appears as /ŋ/ rather than as /h/ as in other Luhya dialects.

Avestan also shows the effects of rhinoglottophilia: Proto-Indo-Iranian *s normally becomes h in Avestan, but becomes a velar nasal between a/ā and r, i̯, u̯, or a/ā. Examples include aŋra 'evil' (Sanskrit asra), aŋhat̰ 'he may be' (Sanskrit ásat), and vaŋ́hō 'better' (Sanskrit vasyas).

Rhinoglottophilia may occur with any laryngeal sound, not just specifically glottal ones. For example, correspondences such as Khoekhoe xárà 'meerkat' and Khwe xánà 'banded mongoose' (and similar correspondences between nasalized and nonnasalized clicks) have been explained as pharyngealization of the vowel in proto-Khoe.

== See also ==
- Voiceless nasal glottal fricative
- Voiced nasal glottal fricative
