= Inor language =

Semitic language spoken in Ethiopia

Inor
- Ennemor
- Native to: Ethiopia
- Native speakers: (undated figure of 280,000)
- Language family: Afro-Asiatic: Semitic; West Semitic; South Semitic; Southwest Semitic; Ethiopic; South Ethiopic; Outer South Ethiopic; West Gurage; Inor
- Writing system: Ge'ez script

Language codes
- ISO 639-3: ior
- Glottolog: inor1238

Inor (pronounced [inoːr]), sometimes called Ennemor, is an Afroasiatic language spoken in central Ethiopia. One of the Gurage languages, it is mainly spoken within the Gurage Zone in the Southern Nations, Nationalities, and Peoples' Region, as well as by speakers of the language who have settled in Ethiopian cities, especially Addis Ababa. In addition to the morphological complexity that is common to all Semitic languages, Inor exhibits the very complex morphophonology characteristic of West Gurage languages.

Endegegn, Enner, Gyeto, and the extinct dialect Mesmes are all sometimes considered dialects of Inor.

Inor possesses nasal vowels, which are unusual for a Gurage language. Many of these may be the result of historical rhinoglottophilia.

== Phonology ==
=== Consonants ===
Inor consonants
		labial		alveolar	alveo- palatal	palatal	velar		glottal	
		plain	labial	alveolar	alveo- palatal	palatal	plain	labial	plain	labial
Stops and affricates	ejective			t’	tʃ’	cʼ	k’	kʷ’		
Stops and affricates	voiceless	p	pʷ	t	tʃ	c	k	kʷ	ʔ	ʔʷ
Stops and affricates	voiced	b	bʷ	d	dʒ	ɟ	ɡ	ɡʷ		
Fricatives	voiceless	f	fʷ	s	ʃ	ç	x	xʷ		
Fricatives	voiced	(β)		z	ʒ					
Nasals		m	mʷ	n		ɲ				
Approximants				(l)		j		w		
Rhotics				r						

Sounds /b, n, mʷ/ when in lenited position are heard as [β, r̃, w̃].

=== Vowels ===
Inor vowels
	front	central	back
high	i	ɨ	u
mid	e	ə	o
low	æ	a	

[ɨ] may be regarded as largely epenthetic and only marginally phonemic.

== Bibliography ==
- Abza, Tsehay (2016). Binyam Sisay Mendisu; Janne Bondi Johannessen (eds.). "Consonants and Vowels in the Western Gurage Variety Inor: Complex Connections between Phonemes, Allophones, and Free Alternations". Oslo Studies in Language. 8 (1): 31–54. doi:10.5617/osla.4416.
- Boivin, Robert (1996). "Spontaneous Nasalization in Inor". In Hudson, G. (ed.). Essays on Gurage Language and Culture. Wiesbaden: Harrassowitz Verlag. pp. 21–33.
- Bustorf, Dirk (2005). "Ennämor Ethnography". In Uhlig, Siegbert (ed.). Encyclopaedia Aethiopica. Vol. 2: D-Ha. Wiesbaden: Harrassowitz Verlag. pp. 307–308.
- Chamora, Berhanu. "Consonant distribution in Inor". In Hudson, G. (ed.). Essays on Gurage Language and Culture. Wiesbaden: Harrassowitz Verlag. pp. 53–67.
- Chamora, Berhanu; Hetzron, Robert (2000). Inor. Munich: Lincom Europa. ISBN 3-89586-977-5.
- Hetzron, R. (1977). The Gunnän-Gurage Languages. Napoli: Istituto Orientale di Napoli. OCLC 4989162.
- Leslau, Wolf (1979). Etymological Dictionary of Gurage (Ethiopic). Vol. 1–3. Wiesbaden: Otto Harrassowitz. ISBN 3-447-02041-5.
- Leslau, Wolf (1983). Ethiopians Speak: Studies in Cultural Background. Part V : Chaha - Ennemor. Äthiopistische Forschungen. Vol. 16. Wiesbaden: Franz Steiner Verlag. ISBN 3-515-03965-1.
- Leslau, Wolf (1996). "Inor Lullabies". Africa. 66 (2): 280–287. doi:10.2307/1161320. JSTOR 1161320.
- Voigt, Rainer (2005). "Ennämor Language". In Uhlig, Siegbert (ed.). Encyclopaedia Aethiopica. Vol. 2: D-Ha. Wiesbaden: Harrassowitz Verlag. p. 307.
- Berhanu Chamora; Jean-François Prunet; Sharon Rose (2023). "Inor group". In Ronny Meyer; Zelealem Leyew; Bedilu Wakjira (eds.). Oxford Handbook of Ethiopian Languages. Oxford: Oxford University Press. pp. 531–553.
