= Zai, Palghar =

Village in Maharashtra

Zai
- Town
- Location in Maharashtra, India Zai (India)
- Coordinates: 20.1322414°N 72.7385323°E
- Country: India
- State: Maharashtra
- District: Palghar
- Taluka: Talasari
- Elevation: 11 m (36 ft)

Population (2011)
  - Total: 4,571
- Time zone: UTC+5:30 (IST)
- 2011 census code: 551558

Zai is a town in the Palghar district of Maharashtra, India. It is located in the Talasari taluka.

== Demographics ==
According to the 2011 census of India, Zai has 905 households. The effective literacy rate (i.e. the literacy rate of population excluding children aged 6 and below) is 74.94%.

Demographics (2011 Census)
	Total	Male	Female
Population	4571	2299	2272
Children aged below 6 years	477	245	232
Scheduled caste	0	0	0
Scheduled tribe	2304	1128	1176
Literates	3068	1700	1368
Workers (all)	1942	1193	749
Main workers (total)	1897	1176	721
Main workers: Cultivators	125	87	38
Main workers: Agricultural labourers	652	270	382
Main workers: Household industry workers	248	127	121
Main workers: Other	872	692	180
Marginal workers (total)	45	17	28
Marginal workers: Cultivators	10	4	6
Marginal workers: Agricultural labourers	7	2	5
Marginal workers: Household industry workers	5	0	5
Marginal workers: Others	23	11	12
Non-workers	2629	1106	1523
