= Argaw Bedaso =

Ethiopian singer

- Born: 5 April 1934 (age 91)
- Occupation: traditional singer

Argaw Bedaso (born 5 April 1934) is a longtime Ethiopian traditional singer who has won praise for his Gurage songs. His most popular song is titled "Alem Bire". He has been performing since 1957 and despite his age still performs and is active in the Ethiopian music scene.

In his early days, Argaw Bedaso was a deacon of the Ethiopian Orthodox Church, related to Coptic Christianity.

He claims his resiliency and good health is due to his interest in exercising, and he promotes running for health.

Argaw Bedaso has had eighteen children, ten of them from one mother. Four of his children have died. Argaw's first wife died only after a year of marriage and he has been with his current wife for forty five years.
