= Gafat language =

Extinct Semitic language of Ethiopia

Gafat
- Native to: Ethiopia
- Ethnicity: Gafat
- Extinct: after 1947
- Language family: Afro-Asiatic: Semitic; West Semitic; South Semitic; Ethiopic; South; Outer; n-group; Gafat

Language codes
- ISO 639-3: gft
- Glottolog: gafa1240

The Gafat language is an extinct Ethio-Semitic language once spoken by the Gafat people along the Blue Nile in Ethiopia, and later, speakers pushed south of Gojjam in what is now East Welega Zone. Gafat was related to the Harari language and Eastern Gurage languages. The records of this language are extremely sparse. There is a translation of the Song of Songs written in the 17th or 18th Century held at the Bodleian Library.

Charles Tilstone Beke collected a word list in the early 1840s with difficulty from the few who knew the language, having found that "the rising generation seem to be altogether ignorant of it; and those grown-up persons who profess to speak it are anything but familiar with it." The most recent accounts of this language are the reports of Wolf Leslau, who visited the region in 1947 and after considerable work was able to find a total of four people who could still speak the language. Edward Ullendorff, in his brief exposition on Gafat, concludes that as of the time of his writing, "one may ... expect that it has now virtually breathed its last."

== Bibliography ==
- Adelung, Johann Christoph. (1812). Mithridates, oder allgemeine Sprachkunde. Berlin. [vol. 3, p. 124–125: the same page from the Gafat text of the Song of Songs as in Bruce 1804 below].
- Beke, Charles Tilstone. (1846). "On the Languages and Dialects of Abyssinia and the Countries to the South", in: Proceedings of the Philological Society 2 (London), pp. 89–107.
- Bruce, James. (1804). Travels to Discover the Source of the Nile, In the Years 1768, 1769, 1770, 1771, 1772 and 1773. 2nd ed. Edinburgh. [vol. 2, pp. 491–499: "Vocabulary of the Amharic, Falashan, Gafat, Agow and Tcheretch Agow Languages"; vol. 7, plate III: a page from the Gafat text of the Song of Songs].
- Leslau, Wolf (1944), "The Position of Gafat in Ethiopic", in Language 20, pp. 56–65.
- Leslau, Wolf. (1945). Gafat Documents: Records of a South-Ethiopic Language. American Oriental Series, no. 28. New Haven.
- Leslau, Wolf. (1956). Etudes descriptive et comparative du gafat (éthiopien méridional). Paris: C. Klincksieck.
- Ludolf, Hiob, Historia Aethiopica. Francofurti ad Moenum. [there are 3 sentences in Gafat with Latin translation in chapter 10, §60].
- Franz Praetorius. (1879). Die amharische Sprache. Halle. pp. 13–14.
