= Anna Zay =

Hungarian writer

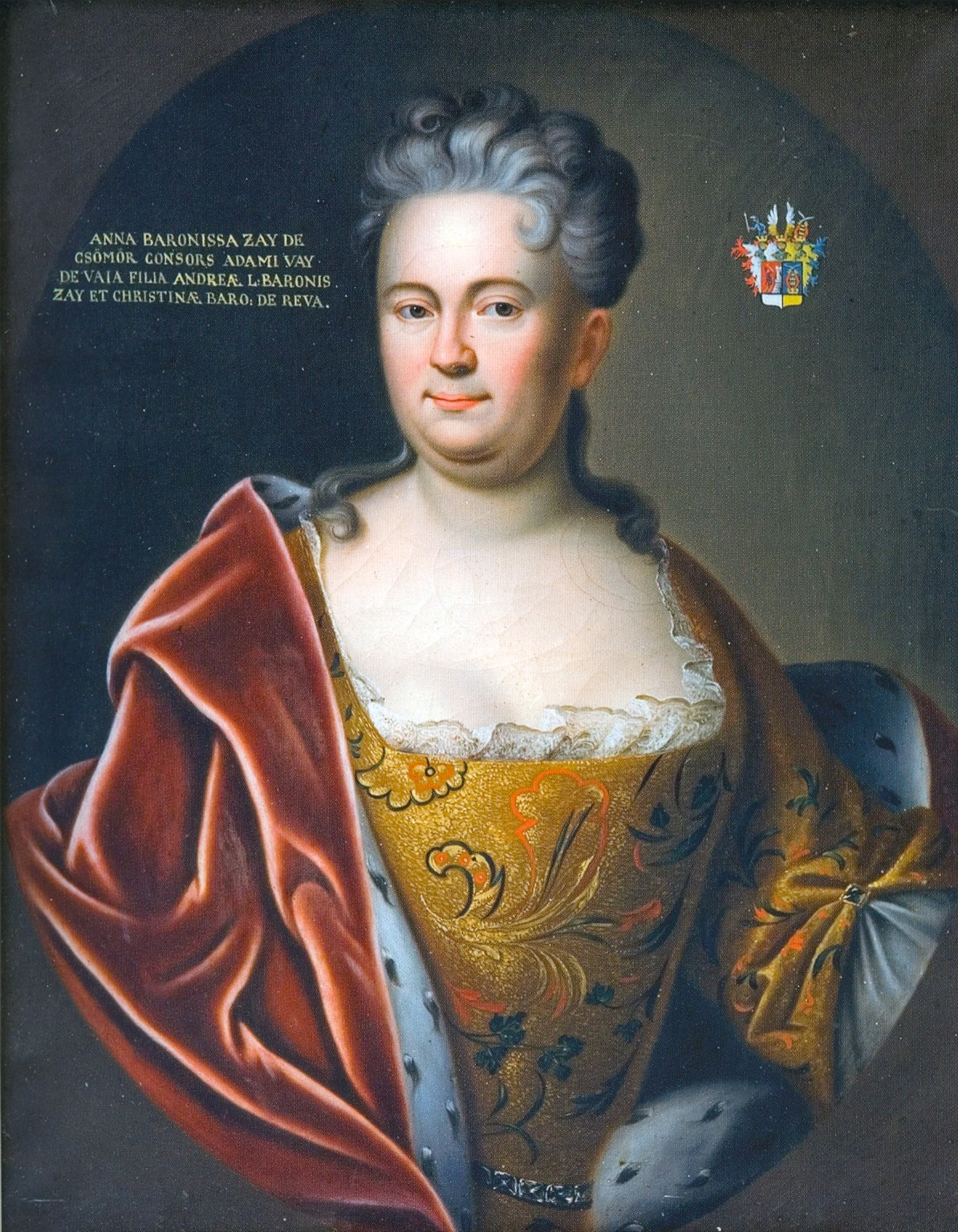
Portrait of Anna Zay.

Anna Zay (1680 – 1733), was a Hungarian writer. She is regarded as a notable member of the early Hungarian baroque poetry. She came from Felvidék Evangelical Lutheran family to her father Baron András Zay (†1685) and her mother Baron Révay Krisztina.
