= Zay Zay Htut =

Burmese painter

- ဇေဇေထွဋ်
- Born: 1983 (age 43); Yangon
- Education: Studies under artists U Tun Tun Zaw, U Tin Tun Hlaing, and U Aung Naing
- Known for: Painter
- Awards: Tun Foundation Banks (Best Painting of the year 2014) (Second Prize); Tun Foundation Banks (Best Painting of the year 2015) (Consolation Prize); Museum Collection; 2019 National Museum Yangon, Myanmar

Zay Zay Htut (Burmese: ဇေဇေထွဋ်; born 1983) is a painter from Myanmar. He is well known for his political and social statements in his ‘To Day Light’ series, where he paints images of closed doors with open padlocks.

Zay was born in 1983 in Yangon, Myanmar. He studied under artists U Tun Tun Zaw, U Tin Tun Hlaing, and U Aung Naing.
