= Zae =

Zae or ZAE may refer to:

- zae, ISO code for the Ixtlán Zapotec dialect cluster
- Bavarian Center of Applied Energy Research, in Garching bei München
- Zones of economic activities, a common feature of French cities such as Mende, Lozère
- Zae da Blacksmith, a member of Christian hip hop collective, The Collective, with Stephen the Levite
