= Soddo language =

Gurage language spoken in Ethiopia

Soddo
- Kəstane
- Native to: Ethiopia
- Region: Gurage Zone, Southern Nations, Nationalities, and Peoples' Region
- Ethnicity: Soddo
- Native speakers: (260,000 cited 1994 census)
- Language family: Afro-Asiatic: Semitic; West Semitic; South Semitic; Ethiopic; South; Outer South; North Gurage; Soddo
- Dialects: Soddo; Goggot (Dobi)
- Writing system: Geʽez script

Language codes
- ISO 639-3: gru
- Glottolog: kist1241

Soddo (autonym kəstane "Christian"; formerly called Aymälläl in Western sources, after a particular dialect of it) is a Gurage language spoken by a quarter million people in southern Ethiopia. It is an Ethiopian Semitic language of the Northern Gurage subfamily. Its native speakers, the Soddo Gurage people (Kistane), live predominantly in the Soddo district of the Gurage Zone.

== Phonology ==
=== Consonants ===
		Labial	Alveolar	Palatal	Velar	Glottal
Nasal		m	n	ɲ		
Stop/ Affricate	voiceless	(p)	t	t͡ʃ	k	(ʔ)
Stop/ Affricate	voiced	b	d	d͡ʒ	g	
Stop/ Affricate	ejective	(pʼ)	tʼ	t͡ʃʼ	kʼ	
Fricative	voiceless	f	s	ʃ		h
Fricative	voiced		z	ʒ		
Rhotic			r			
Lateral			l			
Approximant				j	w	

- [ʔ] is mainly heard when in between vowels, or in syllable-initial position before vowels.
- Sounds /p, pʼ, tsʼ/ can also be heard in borrowed words.
- Sounds /k, ɡ, kʼ/ can also have labialized allophones [kʷ, ɡʷ, kʼʷ].
- /b/ can also be heard as a voiced fricative [β] when in intervocalic position.
- /m/ can be heard as [ɱ] when before /f/, and /n/ as [ŋ] when before /k/.

=== Vowels ===
	Front	Central	Back
Close	i	ɨ	u
Mid	e	ə	o
Open		a	

== Grammar ==
=== Noun ===
As in most Ethiopian languages, noun qualifiers generally follow the noun.

The definite article is expressed by the suffix -i, e.g.: goš "boy" > goš-i "the boy"; ätit "sister" > ätiti "the sister"; bayyočč "children" > bayyočč-i. If the noun ends in -a or -ä, it normally loses this vowel when -i is suffixed: angačča "cat" > angačč-i "the cat". A noun ending in -i usually stays the same: abi "(the) father, proprietor". A noun ending in -e, -o, -u adds a y before the suffix: ge "house" > geʸi "the house"; wälläho "neighbor" > wällähoʸi "the neighbor". If the noun has a qualifier, the article is used with the first element: maläk' ge "big house" > maläk'-i ge "the big house"; yä-šum-i ge "the house of the official" (lit. "of-official-the house"); yä-mät't'-i məss "the man who came" (lit. "who-came-the man".)

There is no real indefinite article, though indefiniteness can be expressed by preposing the word attə or k'una, meaning "one".

Nouns have two genders, masculine and feminine, which affect verb concord.

Nouns which are definite objects (direct or indirect) are both marked with the prefix yä- or nä-: e.g. yä-geʸi ažžo "he saw the house"; yä-zämmihʷan abännət "he gave it to his brother" (lit. "to-his-brother he-gave-him"). Direct objects may additionally be marked by adding the object suffix pronouns to the verb: e.g. yabiddi täšakkunnət "I asked my father" (lit. "my-father-obj. I-asked-him".)

A possessed noun is marked by the prefix yä-, and the possessor precedes the possessed: yä-šum-i ge "the house of the official" (lit. "of-official-the house"). If the possessed noun has a preposition prefixed to it, this yä- is omitted: babiddi färäz rather than *bä-yä-abiddi färäz for "on my father's horse".

=== Pronoun ===
==== Personal pronoun ====
English	Standalone form	Possessive suffix (consonant-final nouns)	Possessive suffix (vowel-final nouns)
I	ädi	-əddi	-ddi
you (m. sg.)	dähä	-dä	-dä
you (f. sg.)	däš	-däš	-däš
he	kʷa	-äw, -kʷan	-w, -hʷan
she	kʸa	-ki	-hi
we	əñña	-əñña	-ñña
you (m. pl.)	dähəm	-dähəm	-dähəm
you (f. pl.)	dähma	-dähma	-dähma
they (m.)	kənnäm	-kənnäm	-hənnäm
they (f.)	kənnäma	-kənnäm	-hənnäm

Possessives can also be formed by simply adding yä- to the standalone pronouns, e.g.: yädähəm t'əb "your clan".

Reflexive pronouns are formed by äras-, gubba-, k'um- plus the possessive suffixes, e.g. ädi äras-əddi mät'afi t'afkunnət "I myself wrote the book".

=== Demonstrative pronoun ===
Proximal: zi "this, these"; zini "this one". E.g.: zi məss "this man", zi məšt "this woman", zi säbočč "these men".

Distal: za "that, those, that one, those ones"; zani "that one there". E.g. tä-za məss goy mät't'ahi "I came with that man".

==== Interrogative pronoun ====
- ma "who?" (man before the copula): man mät't'a? "who came?"
- yäma "whose?"
- mən "what?"; yämən "why?"
- yitta, yittat "which?" E.g. yitta bayy mät't'am "which child came?"
- yittani "which one?"

==== Indefinite pronoun ====
- (yähonä) säb "someone, somebody"
- mannəm (säb) "any(one)" ("no one" with negative verb)
- attəm "any" (="no one, nothing" with negative verb); attəmu "no one" (as pronoun)
- lela (säb) "other"
- yäk'irrä k'äy "other" (lit. "remaining thing")
- attə "a certain"
- ləyyu "different"
- k'una, zam, zəč'ə "same"
- äbälo (f. äbälit) "so-and-so"
- zihom "such"

kulləm = "all" (placed before or after the noun); kulləm-u, bä-mollaw = "whole". yät'oma = "only, alone". "Each, every" is expressed by noun reduplication.

=== Copula and existential verbs ===
The copula (positive and negative) is irregular in the present tense:

English	be	not be
I am	näw(h)	ädäbukk
you (m. sg.) are	nähä	ädäbəkkä
you (f. sg.) are	näš	ädäbəčč
he is	-n, -ən (after a consonant)	ädäbəll
she is	na	ädäbəlla
we are	nänä	ädäbəllänä
you (m. pl.) are	nähəm	ädäbəkkəm
you (f. pl.) are	nähma	ädäbəkkəma
they (m.) are	näm	ädäbəlläm
they (f.) are	näma	ädäbəäma

Example: zämmidi nähä "you are my brother".

The past tense ("he was", etc.) is expressed by the verb näbbär conjugated regularly in the perfect; "he was not" etc. is with annäbär. The future tense is expressed by the imperfect of hono: yəhonu "he will be", etc. The negative future tense is likewise expressed by tihon. The present copula in subordinate clauses is expressed by the subordinate perfect of honä, e.g.: däffär yähonä tädi-goy yalfu "he who is courageous will go with me.

"It is he", etc. can be expressed by adding an element -tt between the pronoun and the copula: e.g. kʷa-ttə-n "it is he".

The existential verb "be at", "exist" in the present is:

English	be at/there	not be at/there
I am	yinähi	yellähu
you (m. sg.) are	yinəho	yellähä
you (f. sg.) are	yinäšin	yelläš
he is	yino	yellä
she is	yinätti	yellät
we are	yinäno	yellänä
you (m. pl.) are	yinähmun	yellähəm
you (f. pl.) are	yinähman	yellähma
they (m.) are	yinämun	yelləm
they (f.) are	yinäman	yelləma

In the past and future, it is expressed just like the copula, with näbbärä and honä. In subordinate clauses the present is expressed with -allä conjugated in the perfect (negative -lellä), e.g.: bämeda yalləmi säbočč araš näm "the people who are in the field are farmers".

The possessive verb "he has" etc. is expressed with the existential verb yino "it is" (agreeing with the object possessed) plus object suffix pronouns (i.e. "it is to him" etc.)

=== Verbs ===
A Soddo verb may have anywhere from one to four consonants, or may be a compound with balo "say" (e.g. bək'k' balo "appear".) In the former case, they fall into three "conjugations" differing in their vowels and in gemination of the imperfect, illustrated for a three-consonant verb:

- säbbäro, imperfect yəsäbru ("break")
- tikkälo, imperfect yətikkəlu
- č'affäro, imperfect yəč'affəru

Derived stems can be formed in several ways:

- reduplicative: e.g. gäddälo "kill" > gədaddälo. This form has a wide variety of meanings, mostly intensifying the verb in some way.
- passive/reflexive/intransitive tä- prefix: e.g. käffälo "pay" > tä-käffälo "be paid". A reciprocal action can be expressed by this prefix attached to a transitive verb with the vowel a after the first radical, or a reduplicative form, e.g. tä-gäddäl-mun or tä-gdaddäl-mun "they killed each other".
- causative or transitive of intransitive verbs a-: e.g. säkkäro "be drunk" > a-säkkäro "get someone drunk"; näddädo "burn (intr.)" > a-näddädo "burn (tr.)".
- causative of transitive or passive verbs at- (+ -i-): e.g. käddäno "cover" > at-kiddäno "cause to cover" or "cause to be covered". Added to the -a- form, it expresses reciprocity and adjutative (helping): atgaddälo "cause to kill one other" or help to kill".
- Some verbs are formed with initial ən- or tän-; the only derived stem from these is the a- stem, with a- replacing ə- or tä-. E.g. ənkrättäto "be bent" > ankrättäto "bend".

There are two tenses/aspects, perfective (past) and imperfective (non-past); each has distinct forms for main versus subordinate clauses, and positive versus negative. There are also distinct jussive, imperative, and impersonal forms.

==== Conjugations ====
===== Perfect =====
English	main clause	subordinate clause	relative clause	subordinate with -m
I measured	säffär-ki	säffär-kʷ	yä-säffär-k-i	säffär-kum
you (m. sg.) measured	säffär-ko	säffär-kä	yä-säffär-k-i	säffär-käm
you (f. sg.) measured	säffär-šin	säffär-š	yä-säffär-š-i	säffär-šəm
he measured	säffär-o	säffär-ä	yä-säffär-i	säffär-äm
she measured	säffär-ätti	säffär-ät	yä-säffär-ätt-i	säffär-ättəm
we measured	säffär-no	säffär-nä	yä-säffär-n-i	säffär-näm
you (m. pl.) measured	säffär-kəmun	säffär-kəmu	yä-säffär-kəm-i	säffär-kəmum
you (f. pl.) measured	säffär-kəman	säffär-kəma	yä-säffär-kəma-yi	säffär-kəmam
they (m.) measured	säffär-mun	säffär-m	yä-säffär-m-i	säffär-mum
they (f.) measured	säffär-man	säffär-ma	yä-säffär-ma-yi	säffär-mam

The form with suffixed -m is used in subordinate clauses to connect verbs not otherwise connected, in a way analogous to Japanese -te; it can be translated as "and", as a gerund, or as a resultative. The perfect in -m followed by näbbär forms the pluperfect.

The negative perfect is formed by prefixing al-, with vowel change; for the conjugations mentioned above, the resulting forms are al-säfärä, al-täkkälä, and al-č'afärä.

Examples: ge aräššo "he built a house"; banätäw k'ən awänna-m bämida tonnaw "having put butter on the top of his head, he sat outside".

===== Imperfect =====
English	main clause	subordinate clause
I advance	äbädru	äbädər
you (m. sg.) advance	təbädru	təbädər
you (f. sg.) advance	təbädri	təbʸedər
he advances	yəbädru	yəbädər
she advances	təbädri	təbädər
we advance	(ən)nəbädru	(ən)nəbädər
you (m. pl.) advance	təbädrəmun	təbädrəm
you (f. pl.) advance	təbädrəman	təbädrəma
they (m.) advance	yəbädrəmun	yəbädrəm
they (f.) advance	yəbädrəman	yəbädrəma

Like the perfect, the subordinate forms can take the suffix -m to express a series of non-past actions. This can be combined with näbbär to express a habitual past action.

Examples: ahoññ gäbäya nalfu "today we shall go to the market"; yəgädəl məss "the man who kills"; mas tənäsa-m yibara wawt'a tək'ärsi "she picks up the sleeping mats and begins to remove the dung."

It can be augmented by -ən, with no obvious change in meaning.

English	negative main clause	negative subordinate clause
I do not begin	täk'ärs	annək'ärs
you (m. sg.) do not begin	təttək'ärs	attək'ärs
you (f. sg.) do not begin	təttək'erš	attək'erš
he does not begin	tik'ärs	ayk'ärs
she does not begin	təttək'ärs	attək'ärs
we do not begin	tənnək'ärs	annək'ärs
you (m. pl.) begin	təttək'ärsəm	attək'ärsəm
you (f. pl.) advance	təttək'ärsəma	attək'ärsəma
they (m.) advance	tik'ärsəm	ayk'ärsəm
they (f.) advance	tik'ärsəma	ayk'ärsəma

Examples: ahoññ yəmät'a timäsəl "it does not seem that he will come today"; ädahʷan t-aykäfəl alläfo "he left without paying his debt".

===== Jussive and Imperative =====
			conjugation A	conjugation B	conjugation C
1st person	singular		näsfər	näšäkkət	nägalb
1st person	plural		(ən)nəsfär	nəšäkkət	nəgalb
2nd person	singular	m.	səfär	šäkkət	galb
2nd person	singular	f.	səfer	šäkkič	galʸib
2nd person	plural	m.	səfärəm	šäkkətəm	galbəm
2nd person	plural	f.	səfärma	šäkkətma	galbəma
3rd person	singular	m.	yesfər, yäsfər	yešäkkət	yegalb
3rd person	singular	f.	tesfər	tešäkkət	tegalb
3rd person	plural	m.	yesfərəm	yešäkkətəm	yegalbəm
3rd person	plural	f.	yesfərma	yešäkkətma	yegalbəma

These are negated by the prefix ay-: ayəsfär, ayšäkkət, aygalb. The 2nd person forms then change to conform to the others: attəsfär, attəsfer, attəsfärəm, attəsfärma.

E.g.:

yä-wäzälawan-hom yewsəd "let him take according to his work"
yäsäb waga attəlgäd "don't touch someone's property"
ärəf-əm tona "rest and sit down" (sit down quietly)
