= Gurage people =

Semitic-speaking ethnic group in Ethiopia

Gurage
ጉራጌ (Ge'ez)
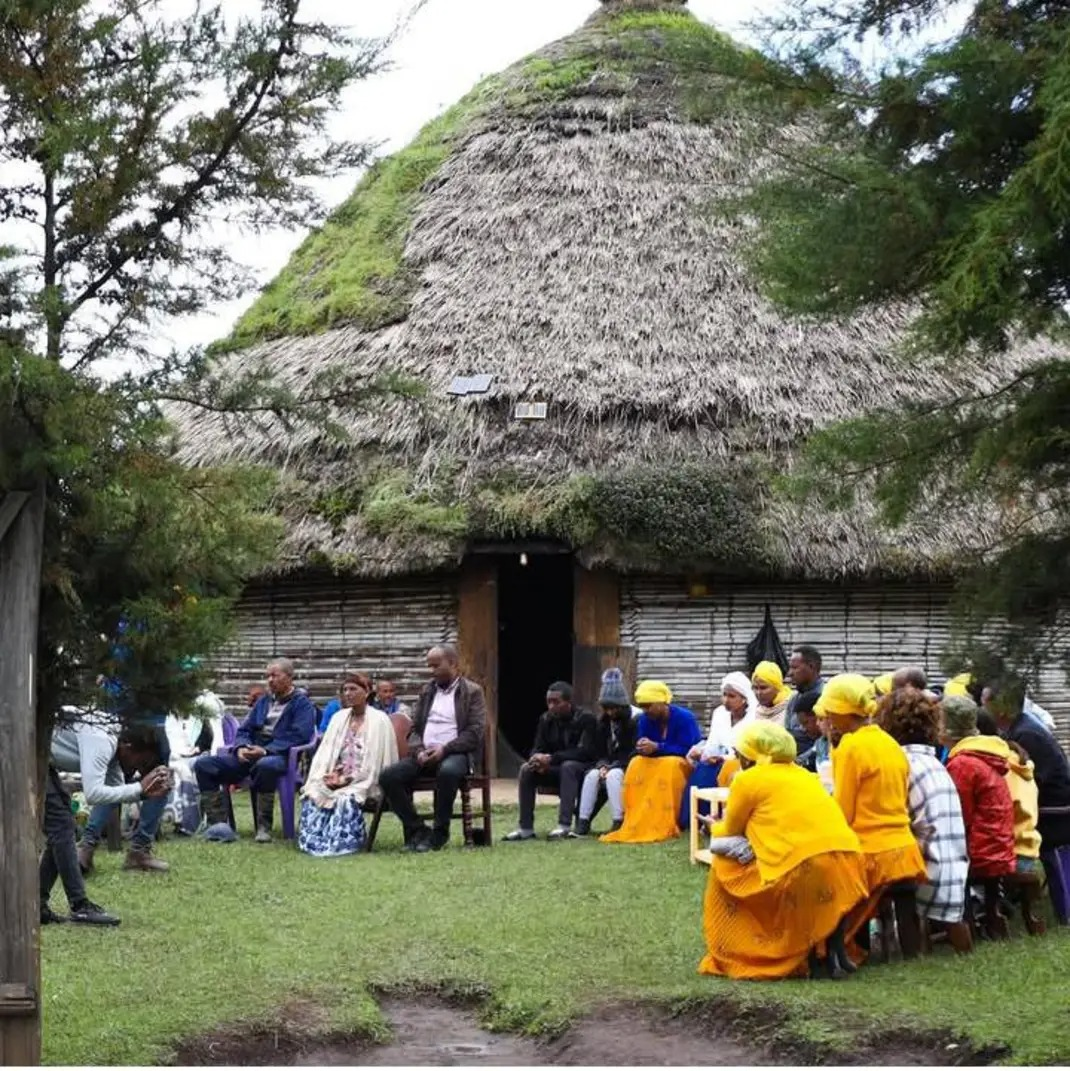
- Gathering in front of a traditional Gurage house

Total population
- 1,867,350 (2007)

Regions with significant populations
- Ethiopia

Languages
- Gurage languages

Religion
- Majority: Oriental Orthodox Christianity; Significant Minority: Islam; Minority: Traditional faith

Related ethnic groups
- Argobba; Amhara; Harari; Silte; Zay; other Ethiopian Semitic peoples

Gurage (/ɡʊəˈrɑːɡeɪ/, Gurage: ጉራጌ) are a Semitic-speaking Habesha ethnic group inhabiting Ethiopia. They inhabit the Gurage Zone and East Gurage Zone, a fertile, semi-mountainous region in Central Ethiopia Regional State, about 125 kilometers southwest of Addis Ababa, bordering the Awash River in the north, the Gibe River, a tributary of the Omo River, to the southwest, and Hora-Dambal in the east.

According to the 2007 Ethiopian national census, the Gurage can also be found in substantial numbers in Addis Ababa, Oromia Region, Harari Region and Dire Dawa.

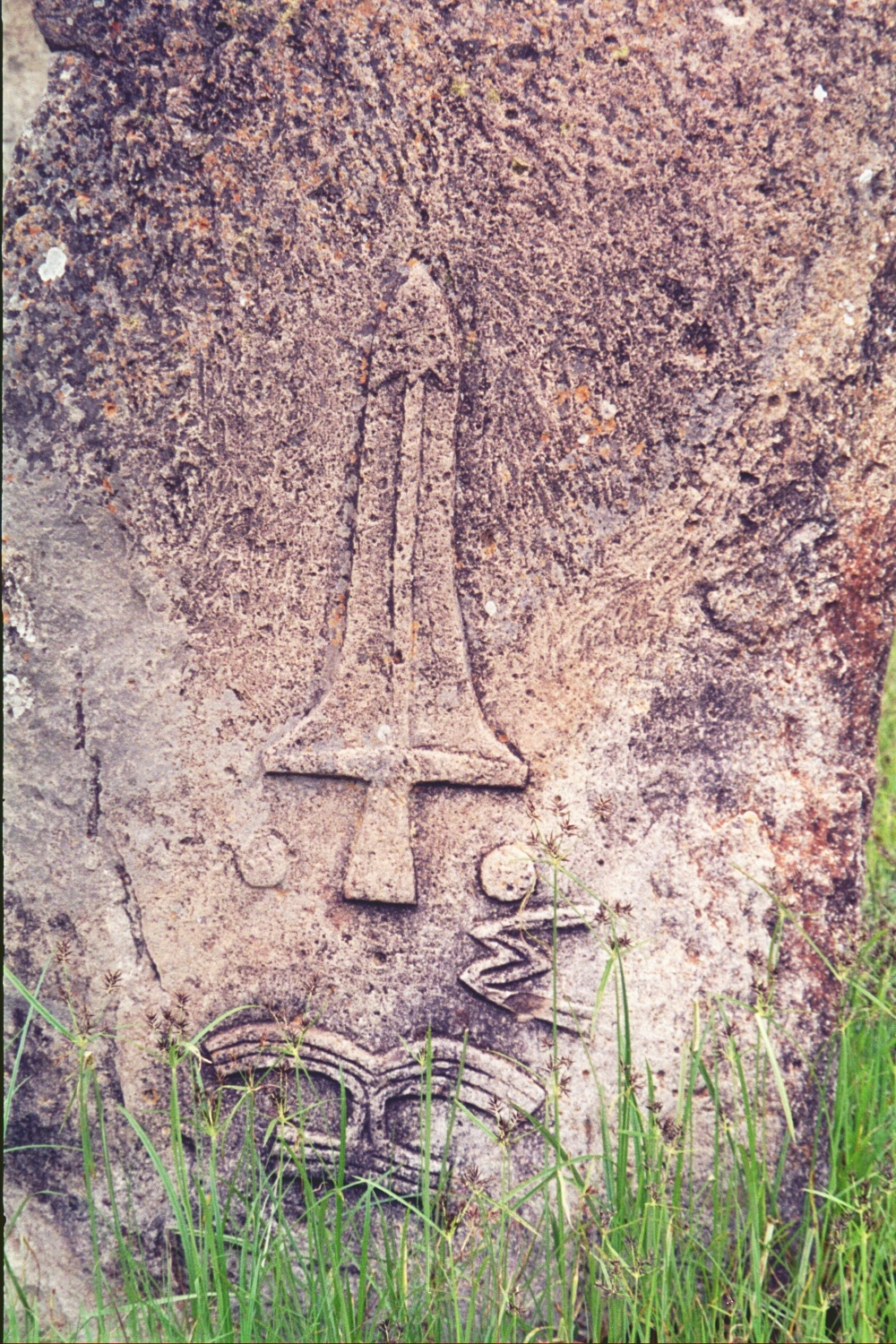
The Gurage stelae are of three types: anthropomorphic stelae with human figures, phallic stelae, and stelae of neither anthropomorphic nor phallic type.Tiya (archaeological site)

== History ==
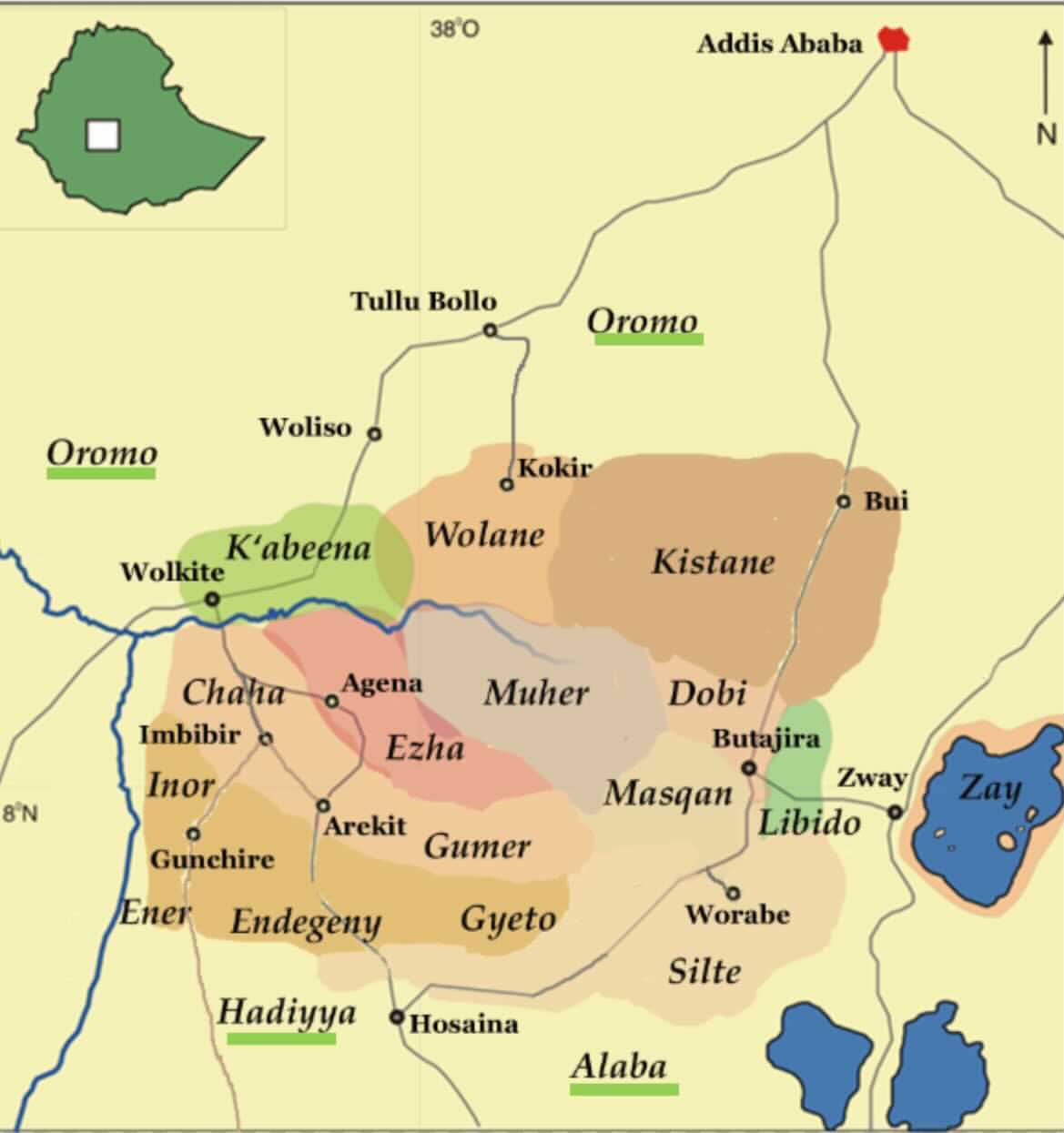
A map of the geographic distribution of the different subgroups of the Gurage

According to the linguist Marcel Cohen, the Gurage are likely the descendants of a very isolated group of ancient Semitic-speaking South Arabian settlers who established themselves around the Lake Zway region and mixed with the indigenous peoples. However other historians have raised the complexity of seeing Gurage peoples as a singular group. For example, Ulrich Braukhamper states that the eastern Gurage (Siltʼe, Wolane, Zay) were probably an extension of the Harla and they often cite kinship with Hararis. Oral traditions also states that Emperor Amda Seyon established a military colony in northern Gurage (Aymellel) of soldiers from Akele Guzai led by Azmach Sebhat. This is evidenced by the establishment of several medieval churches in the Gurage region (Moher Eyesus Gedam, Midre Kebd AbuneYe Gedam and others) from the 12th and 13th centuries. Thus, historically the Gurage peoples may be the product of a complex mixture of Abyssinian and Harla groups.

The Gurage first appear in the Royal Chronicle of Emperor Amda Seyon I where it claims that Sabr ad-Din I appointed a governor for the Alamalé region (i.e. Aymellel, part of the "Guragé country"). Sabr ad-Din appears to have gained some Gurage support, as according to the chronicle his forces included 12 "Geragi" (Gurage) and 3 "Seltogi" (Siltʼe) leaders. By the 15th century, the Gurage region had become an established part of the Ethiopian Empire, the Ennemor were recorded during the reign of Emperor Yeshaq I as paying tribute in horses. Emperor Baeda Maryam visited Aymellel where his chronicle claims that he loved the area and planted "all kinds of sweet-smelling plants".

The first explicit mention of the Gurages comes from the Portuguese traveller and priest Francisco Alvares who visited Ethiopia in the 1520s. According to Alvares, the Gurages were a fiercely independent people who resented the Christian Ethiopians. He wrote that "...of these are no slaves because they say that they sooner allow themselves to die, or kill themselves than serve the Christians." The Gurages also had a bad reputation as being robbers who regularly attacked the royal military camp (katama) of Lebna Dengel. This was particularly serious for Behtweded, the Emperor's favorite courtier, whose quarters were situated on the left of the camp and were prone to attacks. Alvares claims that the attacks were so common "they were few days when it was not said: 'Last night the Gorages killed fifteen to twenty people of the people of great Betudede."

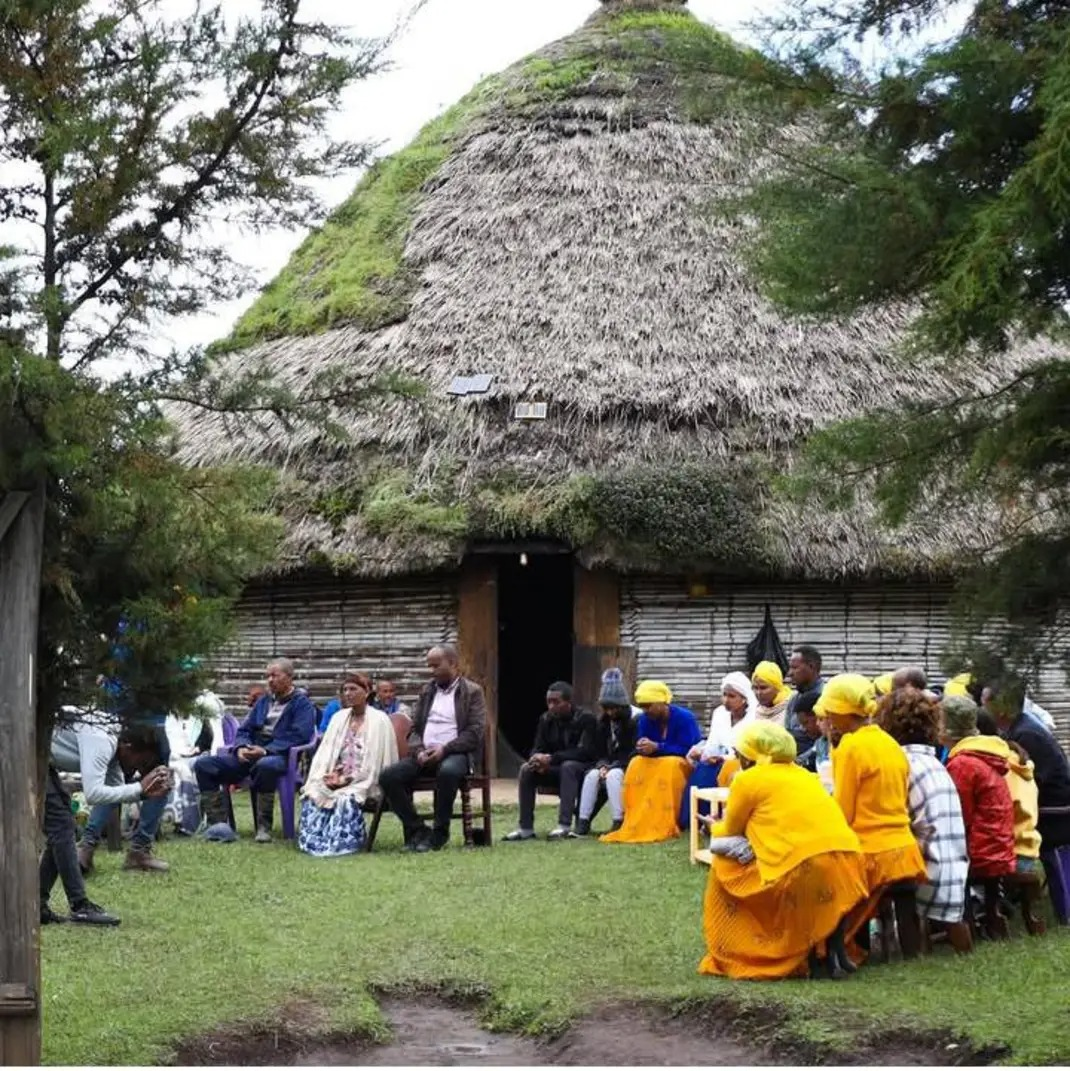
Gathering in front of a traditional Gurage house

The next time the Gurages were mentioned is in the Futuh al-Habasha, the history of the conquests of Imam Ahmad ibn Ibrahim al-Ghazi. Many Christian Gurages participated in the war. After the Muslim victory at Antokya, Emperor Lebna Dengel’s courtier, Wasan Sagad, sent a message to Imam Ahmad claiming that the imperial army had been reinforced by contingents from Gurage, Gafat, Damot, Jimma, and Enarya. When the envoy arrived with the message, the Imam, though ill, met him personally to prevent news of his illness from emboldening his enemies.He told the messenger that such vassals could not frighten them and challenged his opponent to fight for his land if he was truly powerful. The Imam’s forces took control of the Gurage region, where many inhabitants, including Muslims, had been hostile to Lebna Dengel’s rule. However, the islands of Lake Zway remained under Christian control and preserved valuable manuscripts during the war. The Adal occupation of Gurage was short-lived and effectively ended soon after the Imam’s death in 1543. Some elements of the Gurage, such as the Wolane, claim to be descendants of the soldiers of Imam Ahmad al-Ghazi who fled to the Gurage area after their disastrous defeat at Wayna Daga. Several clans of the Kistane Gurage are also recorded to have been descended from Amharas, as well as Tigrayans who migrated to the area to escape Gragn's invasions and which are attested in their ancestral lineages (i.e. Fasil, Timhirtemeskel).

Zäsellasé was a military leader of Gurage origin. Described as being of humble birth, he rose to prominence and eventually commanded the royal troops following the death of Emperor Sarsa Dengel. In 1603, Zäsellasé headed a rebellion of the Qʷerban troops against Yaʿeqob, the nephew and heir of Sarsa Dengel, accusing him of usurpation and adherence to Oromo religious practices. The revolt succeeded, and Yaʿeqob was deposed and exiled to Enarya. ZäDengel was subsequently installed as emperor. To secure Zäsellasé’s support, ZäDengel appointed him governor of Dämbeya and Wägära and arranged for him to marry his sister.

Emperor Susenyos I was much involved in the Gurage country. Prior to his coronation as Emperor he marched into the province, where the Christian Gurages asked him to support them against Sidi Mohammed, the Muslim ruler of Hadiya. The chronicler describes the Gurages as a largely Christian people who were "superior in arms" to Oromo and Amhara warriors. The Portuguese Jesuit Manuel de Almeida described them as "heathens and Moors", who did not often obey the Emperor. Their country was situated, he says, on the important trade route between Gojjam and Ennarea, and their warriors included horsemen, as well as men skilled in the use of bows and arrows.

The Gurages typically had very hostile relations with the neighboring Oromos, as the Gurages were often raided for slaves by the Oromos. The traffic of Gurage slaves substantially increased in the mid-19th century. Many Gurages had desperately appealed to Negus Sahle Selassie of Shewa to protect them from Oromo attacks. Karl Wilhelm Isenberg witnessed Gurage slaves begging at the feet of the Negus, attesting that when they go to Shewa they are often nearly naked as Oromos frequently ambush and rob them. In response, Sahle Selassie gifted them new clothes, knowing that the Oromos, fearing his wrath, would not dare rob them again. Despite these incidents, many Oromos also peacefully intermarried with the Gurages, with many of the latter speaking the language of the former and adopting Oromo names. Many Oromos adopted traditional Gurage customs and cultures, this is most present with the Jida and Abado clans of the Tulama branch, as well as the Geto who are mostly indistinguishable from the Gurages customs or tradition.

In the 1830s, Walga Moe, a leader of the Kebena, along with two Gurage muslims, Umar Bekesa and Ali Dänäbo, established a petty Muslim state in the region. This political formation laid the foundation for later resistance movements in southern Ethiopia. In the 19th century, the Gurage people came under pressure from the expanding empire of Menelik II of Shewa, whose military campaigns, referred to as the Agar Maqnat. Initially, the Gurages, with the exception of the Soddo Gurage who submitted to Menelik in 1876 without resistance, fiercely opposed his expansion. From 1874 onward, they fought to defend their independence and lands for 14 years, successfully repelling Menelik's forces in several battles. The most intense and significant of these was the Battle of Aräkit (in Gumär) in 1875 where Hassan Enjamo of Kebena, the son of Walga Moe, defeated a large Shewan force. Only about one-third of Menelik's men returned safely and a number of Shewan captives were sold to the Wällamo region by the victors. Among those killed in the battle was Aläqa Zänäb, author of the first chronicle of Emperor Tewodros II. It wasn't until 1888 when Gobana Dacche defeated Hassan Enjamo at the Battle of Jebdu Meda were the Gurages finally subdued.

Following their incorporation into the modern Ethiopian state, the repressive neftenya system over their homeland facilitated urban migration, initially migrating for labor in Addis Ababa to generate the necessary cash to pay the taxes imposed on them. Throughout the history of Addis Ababa, the Gurage have been both the city's main labor force and the driving force behind Addis Mercato. By the early 20th century, Gurage had become synonymous with porters, as people would call for laborers by shouting the name "Gurage". Until the 1950s, most urban Gurage worked in manual labor, petty trade, or as shopkeepers for foreign traders (Yemeni Arabs, Armenians, Greeks, and Indians), who then dominated Ethiopia's economy. However, between the 1950s and 1970s, they successfully outcompeted foreign entrepreneurs, effectively dominating Ethiopia's emerging capitalist economy. Today, their strong work ethic and entrepreneurial success remain integral to Ethiopia's economic and social fabric, with "Gurageness" often associated with business acumen in public discourse.

== Languages ==
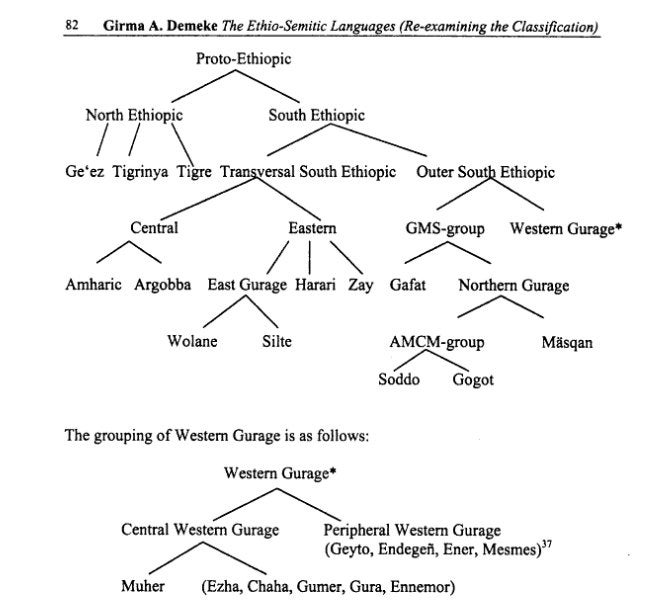
A visual diagram of the distributions of Ethio-Semitic languages

The Gurage people speak multiple different Ethiopian Semitic languages, collectively known as Gurage languages, within the Semitic family of the Afroasiatic language family. Earlier they were considered different dialects of a single "Gurage language", but this view is untenable and at least three groups must be distinguished: Northern, Eastern and Western. The Eastern group, in particular, is not closely related to the others, but instead most closely to Harari.

- The Western Gurage languages are Sebat Bet, consisting of the dialects Inor, Ezha, Muher, Geta, Gumer, Endegegn and Chaha; and Masqan. Mesmes is extinct.
- Northern Gurage consists of the dialects of the Soddo language. It might be closely related to the extinct Gafat, which is not considered a Gurage language.
- The Eastern Gurage languages are Silte, Wolane (also considered a dialect of Silte) and Zay (or Zway).

Like other Ethiopian Semitic languages, the Gurage languages are heavily influenced by the surrounding non-Semitic Afroasiatic Cushitic languages. Gurage languages are written left to right using a system based on the Geʽez script.

According to the 1994 census, the six largest ethnic groups reported in Gurage Zone were the Sebat Bet Gurage (45.02%), the Silt'e (34.81%), the Soddo Gurage (9.75%), the Mareqo or Libido (2.21%), the Amhara (2.16%), and the Kebena (1.82%); all other ethnic groups made up 4.21% of the population. Sebat Bet Gurage is spoken as a first language by 39.93%, 35.04% Silt'e, 10.06% spoke Soddo Gurage, 3.93% spoke Amharic, 2.16% spoke Libido, and 1.93% spoke Kebena; the remaining 6.95% spoke all other primary languages reported. The majority of the inhabitants were reported as Muslim, with 29.98% of the population reporting that belief, while 51.97% practised Ethiopian Orthodox Christianity, 15.9% were Protestants, and 1.95% Catholic. According to the 1994 Ethiopian census, self-identifying Gurage comprise about 2.7% of Ethiopia's population, or about 1.4 million people.

== Agriculture ==
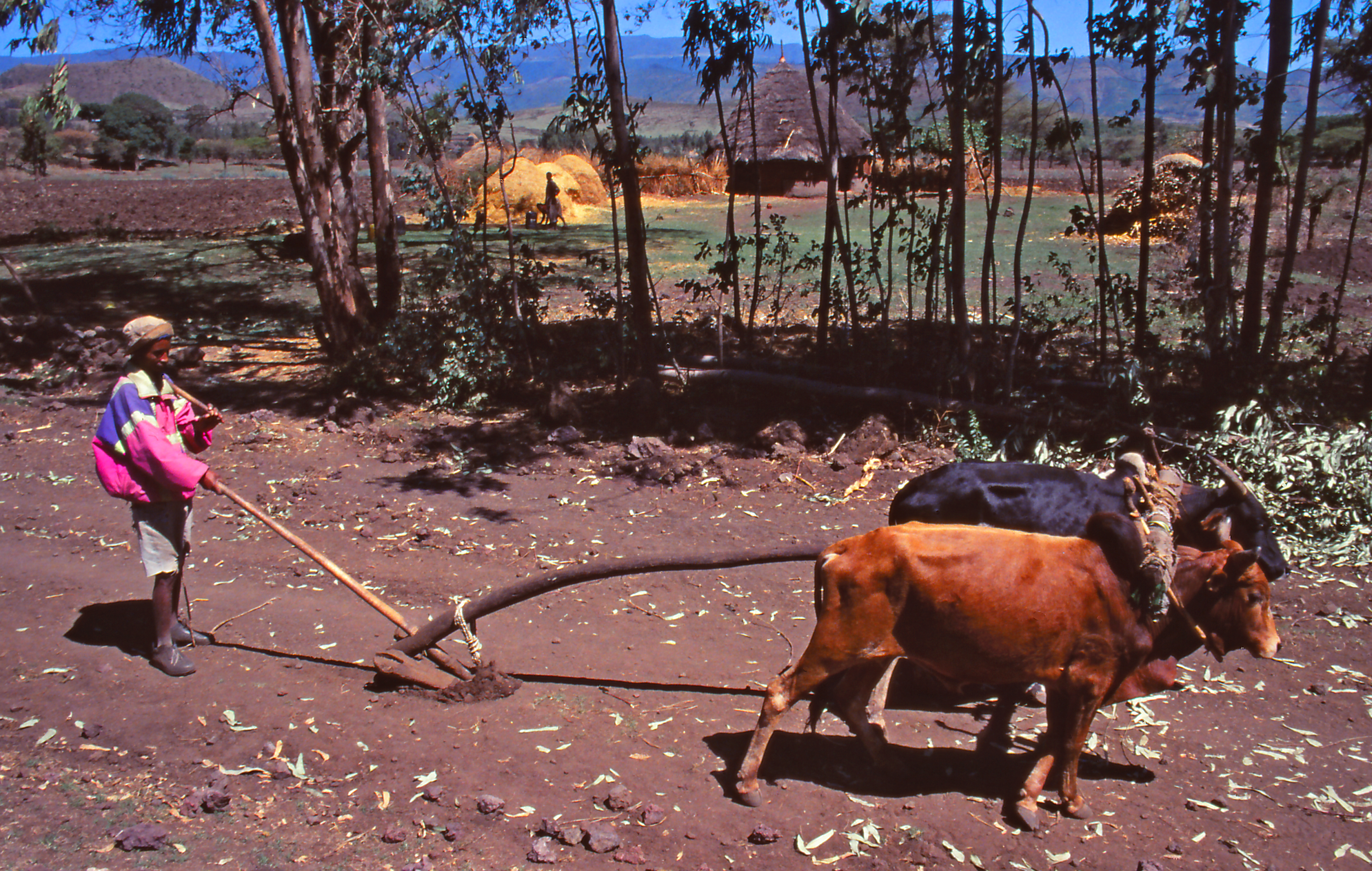
A Gurage boy ploughing in Gurage Zone

The principal crop of the Gurage is ensete (also enset, Ensete edulis, äsät or "false banana plant"). This has a massive stem that grows underground and is involved in every aspect of Gurage life. It has a place in everyday interactions among community members as well as specific roles in rituals. For example, the ritual uses of ensete include wrapping a corpse after death with the fronds and tying off the umbilical cord after birth with an ensete fiber. Practical uses include wrapping goods and fireproofing thatch. Ensete is also exchanged as part of a variety of social interactions, and used as a recompense for services rendered.

Ensete is totally involved in every aspect of the daily social and ritual life of the Gurage, who, with several others tribes in Southwest Ethiopia, form what has been termed the Ensete Culture Complex area... the life of the Gurage is enmeshed with various uses of ensete, not the least of which is nutritional.

Ensete can be prepared in a variety of ways. A typical Gurage diet consists primarily of kocho, a thick bread made from ensete, and is supplemented by cabbage, cheese, butter and grains. Meat is not consumed on a regular basis, but usually eaten when an animal is sacrificed during a ritual or ceremonial event. The Gurage pound the root of the ensete to extract the edible substance, then place it in deep pits between the rows of ensete plants in the field. It ferments in the pit, which makes it more palatable. It can be stored for up to several years in this fashion, and the Gurage typically retain large surpluses of ensete as a protection against famine.

In addition to ensete, cash crops are maintained (notably coffee and khat) and livestock is raised (mainly for milk and fertilizer). Some Gurage also plant teff and eat injera (which the Gurage also call injera).

The Gurage raise zebu. These cattle are primarily kept for their butter, and a typical Gurage household has a large quantity of spiced butter aging in clay pots hung from the walls of their huts. Butter is believed to be medicinal, and the Gurage often take it internally or use it a lotion or poultice. A Gurage proverb states that "A sickness that has the upper hand over butter is destined for death." Different species of ensete are also eaten to alleviate illness.

The Gurage regard overeating as coarse and vulgar, and regard it as poor etiquette to eat all of the ensete that a host passes around to guests. It is considered polite to leave at least some ensete bread even after a very small portion is passed around.

== Architecture ==

Architecture of Gurages is unique among Ethiopian traditional house types. It has received significant nationwide recognition and awards for its higher architectural quality as a living place. According to study done by University of Gonder, College of Social Science; the researchers conducted observations on every aspect of vernacular architecture. This included form, physical arrangement, decoration, collaborative work, transformation, etc.

In regions where extended family gathering are valued, vernacular interiors are often designed to accommodate large groups. Futhermore, In areas with strong religious traditions, interior decorations may feature religious symbols. This suggests that vernacular architecture of the gurages frequently manifests as "anonymous" architecture devoid of a specific architect or designer but rather the collective skills and practices of the community

== Notable Gurages ==
- Teddy Afro
- Mahmoud Ahmed
- Aster Aweke
- Selemon Barega
- Argaw Bedaso
- Sebsebe Demissew
- Habte Giyorgis Dinagde
- Getaneh Kebede
- Berhanu Nega
- Balcha Safo
- Bahru Zewde
- Hailu Fereja (Ethiopian singer)
- Ras Desta Damtew
- Maya Haile Samuelsson
- Derartu Tulu
- Haile Gerima
- Meseret Defar
