= Ethio-Semitic languages =

Family of languages spoken in Eritrea, Ethiopia, and Sudan

Ethio-Semitic
- Ethiosemitic, Ethiopian Semitic, Ethiopic, Abyssinian
- Geographic distribution: Ethiopia, Eritrea and Sudan in Northeast Africa and the Horn of Africa
- Linguistic classification: Afro-Asiatic: Semitic; West Semitic; South Semitic; Southwestern?; Ethio-Semitic
- Subdivisions: North Ethiopic; South Ethiopic

Language codes
- Glottolog: ethi1244
- Ethio-Semitic languages are located within the blue area as purple dots

Ethio-Semitic (also Ethiopian Semitic, Ethiosemitic, Ethiopic or Abyssinian) is a family of languages spoken in Ethiopia, Eritrea and Sudan in Northeast Africa and the Horn of Africa. They form the western branch of the South Semitic languages, itself a sub-branch of Semitic, part of the Afroasiatic language family.

With 57,500,000 total speakers as of 2019, including around 25,100,000 second language speakers, Amharic is the most widely spoken of the group, the most widely spoken language of Ethiopia and second-most widely spoken Semitic language in the world after Arabic. Tigrinya has 7 million speakers and is the most widely spoken language in Eritrea. Tigre is the second-most spoken language in Eritrea, and has also a small population of speakers in Sudan. The Geʽez language has a literary history in its own script starting in the 1st century. Geʽez is no longer spoken, but remains the liturgical language of the Ethiopian and Eritrean Orthodox Tewahedo Churches, as well as their respective Eastern Catholic counterparts.

== Development ==
Ethio-Semitic languages do not share many common innovations. Marcel Cohen and Harold C. Fleming suggested that they could represent two separate branches of Semitic that had independently migrated to Africa. Current research outlines reasons to consider Ethio-Semitic a genetic group, and notes an absence of reasons for any alternative classification within Semitic.

- Agent noun formation with a vowel pattern CaCāCi, e.g. √kʼtʼl 'to kill' → *kʼatʼāli 'killer';
- An innovative verb for 'to exist', *hallawa;
- An infinitive ending *-ot;
- Shared semantic shifts in several Semitic roots, e.g.
  - √blʕ 'to eat' < Proto-Semitic √blʕ 'to swallow' (replaces PS √ʔkl, which only survives in a derived noun *ʔVkl- 'cereal');
  - √lḫsʼ 'bark' < PS √lḫsʼ 'to draw off, peel' (PS √kʼlp survives only in Zay kʼəlfi);
  - √ngŝ 'to be king' < PS √ngɬ 'to push, press for work' (replaces PS *malik 'king', which only survives in a broken plural form *ʔamlāk, meaning 'god');
  - *ŝʼaħāy 'sun' < PS √ɬʼħw 'to shine' (replaces PS *ɬamš-);
- Shared innovative vocabulary, such as √kʼyħ 'to be red', √mwkʼ 'to be warm', √nbr 'to sit', √ndd 'to burn', *ħamad- 'ashes', *marayt- 'earth'.

A unique "causative-reflexive" prefix *ʔasta-, combining two Proto-Semitic causative prefixes *ʔa-, *š- and the reflexive-passive marker *-t-, is productive in Ge'ez and has left occasional remnants in Tigre, Tigrinya and Amharic, but is not known as an independent prefix in the smaller languages. A similar but shorter innovative form *ʔat- has arisen in languages other than Ge'ez, and it is possible that *ʔasta- was a Proto-Ethio-Semitic innovation that later lost productivity.

All Ethiopian Semitic languages have ejective consonants, and the more northern languages have broken plurals, which were formerly regarded as evidence for their connection with the Modern South Arabian languages. Today, these are considered retentions from proto-Semitic that were lost in most or all Central Semitic languages such as Arabic, Aramaic, and Hebrew.

== South Semitic Urheimat ==
The linguistic homeland of the South Semitic languages was widely debated, with some sources, such as A. Murtonen (1967) and Lionel Bender (1997), suggesting an origin in Ethiopia, and others suggesting the southern portion of the Arabian Peninsula.

More recently (2009), a study based on a Bayesian model suggested a South Arabian origin, with Semitic languages being introduced from South Arabia some 2800 years ago. This statistical analysis could not estimate when or where the ancestor of all Semitic languages diverged from Afroasiatic, but it suggested that the divergence of East, Central, and South Semitic branches most likely occurred in the Levant. According to other scholars, Proto-Semitic originated from an offshoot of a still earlier language in North Africa, perhaps in the southeastern Sahara, and desertification forced its inhabitants to migrate in the fourth millennium BCE: some southeast into what is now Ethiopia, others northeast out of Africa into Canaan, Syria and the Mesopotamian valleys.

== Subclassification ==
A primary division of Ethiopic into northern and southern branches was proposed by Cohen (1931) and Hetzron (1972) and garnered broad acceptance, but has not been followed as such in more recent studies. Rainer Voigt argues that features traditionally used to define the Northern and Southern group are not exclusive to them but also found in some languages of the other group, while others do not cover the entire group. Bulakh and Kogan agree on rejecting North Ethiopian Semitic, and point to several unique features particularly in Ge'ez and Tigre; they continue to support the broad Southern group, but not Hetzron's Transversal Southern grouping of Amharic–Argobba and Harari–East Gurage.

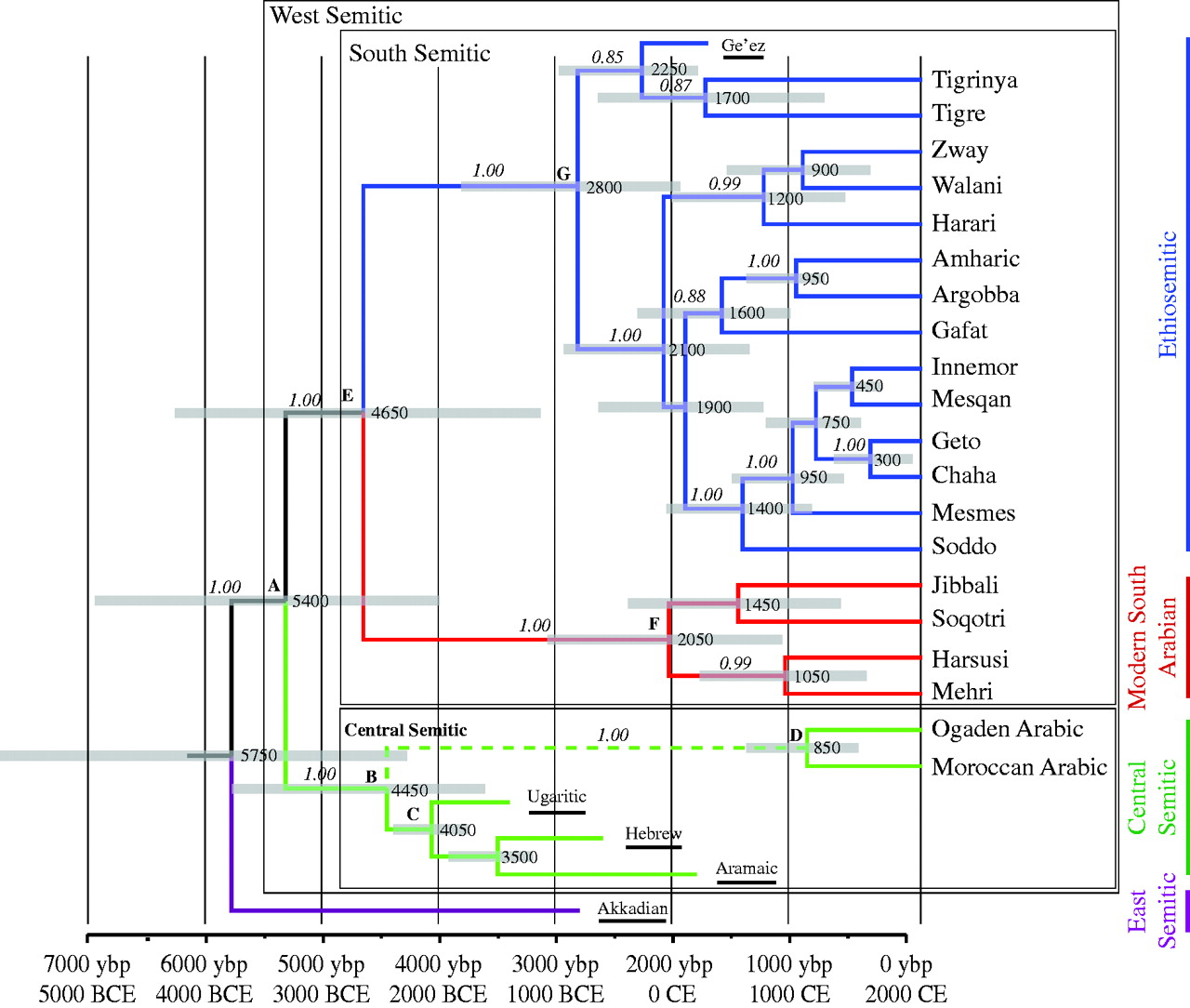
Genealogy of the Semitic languages

- Ethiopic
  - Geʽez (Classical Ethiopic) †
  - Tigre–Dahalik?
    - Tigre
    - Dahalik
  - Tigrinya – Tigrinya is the de facto working language of the State of Eritrea
  - South Ethiopic
    - Amharic–Argobba
      - Amharic – Amharic is the working language of the Federal Government of Ethiopia.
      - Argobba
    - Harari–East Gurage
      - Harari
      - East Gurage
        - Silt'e (Silt'e; dialects Ulbare, Wolane, Inneqor)
        - Zway (Zay)
    - Outer South Ethiopic
      - n-group:
        - Gafat – extinct
        - Soddo (Kistane, North Gurage)
      - tt-group:
        - Mesmes – extinct (sometimes considered Inor)
        - Muher
        - West Gurage
          - Mesqan (Masqan)
          - Sebat Bet
            - Sebat Bet Gurage (dialects Chaha, Ezha, Gumer, Gura)
            - Inor (dialects Ennemor [Inor proper], Endegegn, Gyeto)

=== Hudson (2013) ===
Hudson (2013) recognises five primary branches of Ethiosemitic. His final classification is below.

- Ethiosemitic
  - North
    - Geʽez
    - Dahalik–Tigre–Tigrinya
      - Dahalik–Tigre
        - Dahalik (Note: Although Dahalik is not included on the main tree chart on page 289, Hudson notes on page 9 that other linguists have demonstrated a close relationship between it and Tigre and tentatively classifies it as having split from Tigre when examining Hetzron (1972)'s classification on page 45.)
        - Tigre
      - Tigrinya
  - Gafat (†)
  - Soddo–Mesqan–Gurage
    - Soddo
      - Dobbi
      - Galila
      - Gogot
    - Mesqan–Gurage
      - Mesqan
        - Urib
      - Gurage
        - Muher
        - Chaha–Inor
          - Chaha
            - Ezma
            - Gumer
            - Gura
          - Inor
            - Ener
            - Gyeta
            - Indeganya
            - Meger
            - Mesmes
  - Siltʼe–Zay–Harari
    - Harari
    - Siltʼe–Zay
      - Siltʼe
        - Inneqor
        - Ulbareg
        - Wolane
      - Zay
  - Argobba–Amharic
    - Argobba
    - Amharic

== Bibliography ==
- Cohen, Marcel (1931). Études d'éthiopien méridional [Southern Ethiopian Studies] (in French). Paris.
- Hetzron, Robert (1972). Ethiopian Semitic: studies in classification. Manchester: Manchester University Press.
- Weninger, Stefan. "Vom Altäthiopischen zu den neuäthiopischen Sprachen" [From Old Ethiopian to the New Ethiopian Languages]. In Haspelmath, Martin; König, Ekkehard; Oesterreicher, Wulf; Raible, Wolfgang (eds.). Language Typology and Language Universals (in German). Vol. 2. Berlin: Walter de Gruyter. pp. 1762–1774.
- Hudson, Grover (2013). Northeast African Semitic: Lexical Comparisons and Analysis. Wiesbaden: Harrassowitz. p. 289. ISBN 9783447069830.
