= Zay language =

Afro-Asiatic language spoken in Ethiopia

Zay
- ዛይኘ, የዛይ አፍ
- Native to: Ethiopia
- Region: Lake Zway
- Ethnicity: Zay
- Native speakers: 14,000 (2005)
- Language family: Afro-Asiatic: Semitic; West Semitic; South Semitic; Ethiopic; South; Transversal; Harari–East Gurage; East Gurage; Zay
- Writing system: Geʽez script

Language codes
- ISO 639-3: zwa
- Glottolog: zayy1238
- ELP: Zay
- Zay is classified as Severely Endangered by the UNESCO Atlas of the World's Languages in Danger.

Zay (Oromo: Lak'i, Laqi) is an Afroasiatic language of the Semitic branch spoken in Ethiopia. It is one of the Gurage languages in the Ethiopian Semitic group. The Zay language has around 14,000 speakers known as the Zay, who inhabit Gelila and the other five islands and shores of Lake Zway in the southern part of the country.

== Language situation ==
Map of Ethiopia Showing where Zay is spoken

Zay is an unwritten language. Most speakers are multilingual in other Gurage languages, in the Oromo language, and in Amharic. The language is geographically concentrated around Lake Zway; specifically, in Herera, Meki, Ziway, and the five islands: Fundurro Island (Famat or Getesemani Island) the smallest island; Tsedecha Island (Aysut Island), next to the biggest island; Debre-Tsion Island, the largest island; Gelila Island; and Debre Sina Island. It is an endangered language, with speakers migrating to the mainland adopting the Oromo language, and increasing use of Oromo by the younger generations on the Zay islands.

Zay is 70% lexically similar to the Siltʼe language, and 60% with Harari.

== Grammar ==
The word order of Zay is SOV (subject–object–verb). Attributive adjectives precede the nouns they modify. Possessives also precede nouns. Zay is a pro-drop language, with required subject-marking on the verb.

Zay has been greatly affected by contact it has had with the Gurage languages. This contact has created a significant amount of lexical and grammatical change in Zay.
