= Zay people =

Ethnic minority inhabit in central Ethiopia

Zay
Regions with significant populations
- Ethiopia: 17,884 (2007)

Languages
- Zay, Amharic

Religion
- Ethiopian Orthodox Tewahedo

Related ethnic groups
- Wolane, Silt'e, Harari

The Zay are a small ethnic group in Ethiopia. They live on the islands of Lake Zway, south of Addis Ababa, and engage mainly in fishing. The Oromo refer to the Zay as Laqi meaning “stirrer” or “paddler”. When the Oromo first saw the Zay on their boats they did not know what they were doing and knew only the stirring motion they made with their paddles. The Zay language belongs to the Semitic branch of the Afroasiatic family. It is closely related to the Silte, Harari, and Wolane languages. The Zay belong to the Ethiopian Orthodox Tewahedo Church.

Local tradition suggests that the Zay people comprise three streams of people that populated the islands of Lake Ziway between the early 9th and the mid-17th centuries. It is believed that the Zay people spoke the ancient Harla language.

The Zay economy is mainly based on subsistence agriculture and traditional fishing. The Zay people cultivate maize, sorghum, finger millet, teff, pepper and barley, and raise cattle, goats, sheep, donkeys and chicken. Island dwellers use papyrus boats for transport, while those on the shore use donkeys and horses.

Common health issues include malaria, schistosomiasis, diarrhoea and respiratory diseases. The Zay people generally have limited access to modern health care and primarily rely on medicinal plants, although (as elsewhere in the country) environmental and cultural factors threaten both medicinal plants and traditional medical knowledge.

== See also ==
- Zeila, Ancient port of Harla based Adal Sultanate
