= Arabic language in the United States =

United States Arabic
- Region: United States
- Native speakers: 1.39 million (2020)
- Language family: Afro-Asiatic: Semitic; West Semitic; Central Semitic; Arabic; United States Arabic
- Early forms: Proto-Afroasiatic: Proto-Semitic; Proto-Arabic; Old Arabic; Pre-classical Arabic
- Standard forms: Modern Standard Arabic
- Writing system: Arabic abjad

Language codes
- ISO 639-1: ar
- ISO 639-2: ara
- ISO 639-3: ara

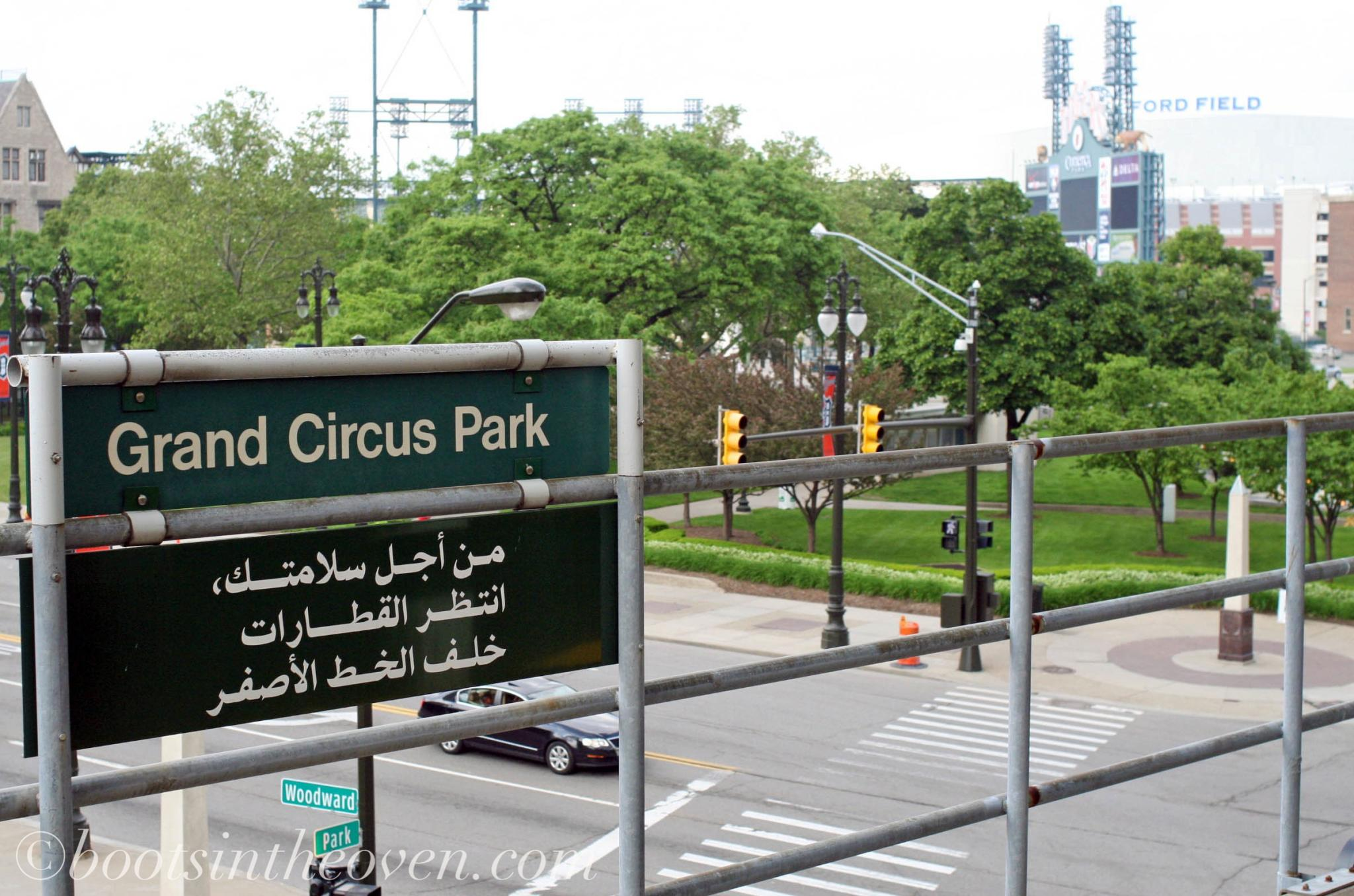
An Arabic warning sign at the Detroit People Mover Grand Circus Park station

The Arabic language is a widely spoken minority language in the United States. According to the 2020 American Community Survey, approximately 1.39 million people reported speaking Arabic at home, making it the sixth most spoken non-English language in the country. Arabic speakers in the United States come from diverse backgrounds, including communities with origins in Lebanon, Syria, Egypt, Morocco, Iraq, Palestine, Algeria, and other Arabic-speaking regions. Arabic is used in cultural, religious, and community settings throughout the United States, and its distribution reflects several waves of immigration and settlement.

As a second language, Arabic (across all varieties of Arabic) saw declining enrollment among colleges and universities between 2016 and 2021. Since the September 11 attacks, Arabic has faced significant discrimination and stereotyping within the United States.

== History ==
=== Atlantic slave trade ===
The Atlantic slave trade brought significant numbers of Arabic speakers to America. Many African Muslim slaves were fluent in Arabic and thus contributed to the language's presence in the United States.

=== 17th - 19th centuries ===
Arabic language education in the United States dates back to the 17th century. Initially, the study of Arabic was introduced to complement the study of Hebrew and the Old Testament. Harvard was the first American college to offer Semitic languages, including Hebrew, Chaldaic, and Syriac in 1640. Later on, Arabic was available sometime between 1654 and 1672 during the presidency of Charles Chauncy. Eventually Arabic began to be taught in other institutions such as the University of Pennsylvania in 1788, Dartmouth and Andover in 1807, and the Theological Seminary in Princeton sometime before the 1880s.

In the 19th century, more American universities began developing departments and courses for the learning of Arabic. In 1841, Edward E. Salisbury was appointed as a professor of Arabic and Sanskrit by Yale, the first person in the Americas to be given such a position. In 1880, Harvard's Department of Semitic Languages was founded, formalizing the university's teaching of Arabic under Professor Crawford H. Toy. In 1883, Paul Haupt, an Assyriologist, established a comprehensive Semitic philology program at Johns Hopkins University, which later influenced the development of similar programs across the nation. By the end of the 19th century, there were sixteen major departments of Semitics in the United States, with Arabic being offered in various colleges and seminaries.

=== 20th century ===
During the first wave of Arab immigration, Christianity was the dominant faith and most were tradesmen. However, since the late 1960s an increasing proportion of Arab immigrants are Muslim. English was used as the language of worship in Arab churches due to the lack of priests who speak Arabic or Syriac. Most of these Arab tradesmen were willing to learn English as well. In the 20th century, Arabs taught and spoke to their children English in order to create an American identity, leaving no time and use for Arabic. Arabic only started to be picked up again after the 1960s when it was used in church and media.

==== United States government ====
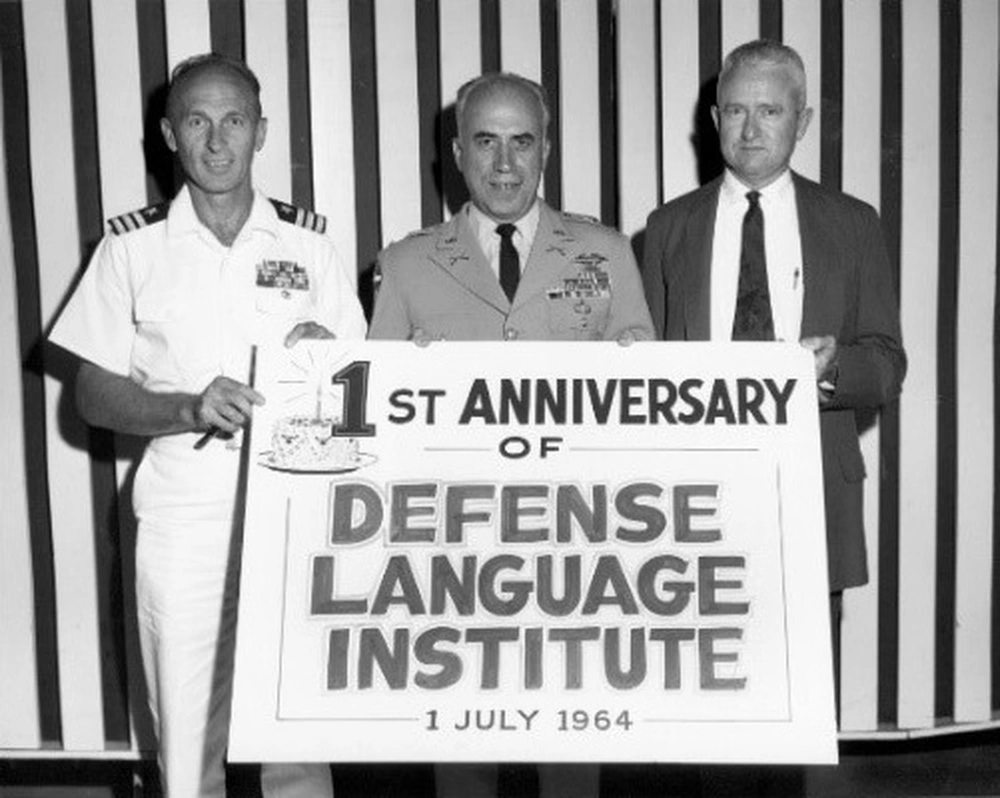
Leaders of the Army, Navy, and Defense Department celebrate the Defense Language Institute's first anniversary in July 1964.

While the Department of Defense did provide some foreign language courses shortly before American involvement in Second World War, systematic education of foreign languages by the United States government, such as Arabic, did not occur until well into the Cold War, with the creation of the Defense Foreign Language Program. The Army Language School (now the Defense Language Institute Foreign Language Center) began teaching Arabic sometime before 1950. Arabic was the second-most taught language at DLI from 1963 to 2018, with a total enrollment over the period of 27,049.

Furthermore, various universities and institutions received support to develop instructional materials and programs for different Arabic dialects under the support of the national standard.

=== Post-9/11 ===
Following the September 11 attacks in 2001, Arabs and Muslims were targeted due to their identity, and labeled as enemies. The stereotypes surrounding Arab and Muslim Americans have led to stigma surrounding Arabic itself. Arab-Americans have reported being threatened with violence or being targeted by police simply for speaking Arabic.

This stigma has also impacted Arabic education. Many Arabic teachers believe that Arabic is not a language to be used on streets because of possible implications and potential threat perceived by non-Arabs. This impacts their teaching strategies, and affects the motivation for students to learn Arabic knowing that they have to be careful when speaking it in public.

== Historical demographics ==
Arabic speakers in the US
Year	Speakers	Note
1980	215,000	(Note: Data rounded by source to the thousands.)
1990	355,000	
2000	614,582	
2010	864,961	
2014	1,117,304	
2019	1,260,437	
2021	1,450,000	

Arabic speakers age 5 years and older in the United States by state as of 2023
State	Estimated Arabic speakers (Note: Much of these data, especially smaller values, have a significant margin of error and should not be treated as exact values.)
Alabama	5,380
Alaska	1,345
Arizona	26,164
Arkansas	1,336
California	208,243
Colorado	15,655
Connecticut	12,399
Delaware	4,765
Florida	83,739
Georgia	23,017
Hawaii	348
Idaho	1,816
Illinois	74,919
Indiana	14,314
Iowa	6,761
Kansas	4,747
Kentucky	11,222
Louisiana	14,421
Maine	3,502
Maryland	26,370
Massachusetts	43,386
Michigan	171,731
Minnesota	13,629
Mississippi	4,600
Missouri	9,552
Montana	329
Nebraska	6,730
Nevada	4,842
New Hampshire	4,397
New Jersey	80,048
New Mexico	5,272
New York	130,314
North Carolina	30,232
North Dakota	604
Ohio	50,780
Oklahoma	7,448
Oregon	8,463
Pennsylvania	49,548
Rhode Island	1,064
South Carolina	4,886
South Dakota	455
Tennessee	30,510
Texas	116,644
Utah	6,288
Vermont	329
Virginia	64,746
Washington	25,298
West Virginia	1,495
Wisconsin	6,977
Wyoming	367

Arabic's increasing significance in the United States is showcased by the continuing growth of its speaker base. Arabic has more than 1.35 million speakers in the United States, making it the sixth most common language spoken in the country and catering to almost 0.5% of the U.S. population. This marks a substantial increase from the 860,000 speakers recorded in 2010 by the United States Census Bureau.

Migration from the Arab-speaking population to the United States dates back to the 18th century in the Atlantic slave trade. African Muslim slaves used Arabic as their means of communication. More sustained immigration started in the late 19th century onward, following trends such as education and have continued to the present. The 2017 American Census Bureau recorded 2 million Arab Americans, while the Arab American Institute suggested numbers may reach 3.7 million.

== Current status ==
The 2000 U.S. census reported 1.2 million Arab Americans, with significant population concentrations in metropolitan areas such as Los Angeles, Detroit, New York, Chicago, and Washington, DC. The largest proportion of Arab Americans traced their heritage to Lebanon, Syria, and Egypt. Regarding socio-economic characteristics, Arab Americans have largely maintained an economic advantage compared to the overall U.S. population. They are engaged in management-level and professional work at a larger proportion compared to the general population.

The study of Arabic language maintenance found two contrasting results. One study found that English continues to be the dominant language spoken by Arab Americans. However, another research found varying degrees of multilingual proficiency in the Detroit area and deduced that Arabic continues to play a vital role for all in the community. Their standard or classical Arabic language functions as a symbol of unification among all language speakers, as it is an expression of identity. Moreover, Arab Americans share more affinity to the Arabic language and culture as it could be either tied to their ethnic identity or their common religion.

=== Education ===
Growing philological interest in the Arab and Middle Eastern world has factored in the development of the increase in Arabic speakers. Universities have increased the number of offered courses related to the Arab and Middle East regions, including Middle Eastern studies, religious studies courses, and, more significantly, language courses for Arabic. From a study involving many notable universities, motivation for learning the language was diverse and ranged from "literature and culture", "wanting to travel/live in the Middle East," "to talk with Arabs," to "research of original sources". According to the Modern Language Association, Arabic was the 8th most studied language in secondary education, with 31,554 enrollments in Fall 2016 and 22,918 enrollments in 2021. Classes were offered in multiple vartieties of Arabic, including MSA, Classical/Qur’anic, Egyptian, Gulf, Iraqi, Levantine, Moroccan, Sudanese, and Syrian.

==== Challenges ====
Arabic exists in many forms, with a standard version, Modern Standard Arabic (MSA), and a myriad of dialects from different regions of the Middle East and North Africa. The debate over which version of Arabic is to be taught at American schools has long existed. Before the September 11 attacks, it was common for higher education institutes in the US to teach solely Modern Standard Arabic, and as of the 2020s, it is still prevalent in universities to teach Modern Standard Arabic first to new learners of the language. After students have gained some degree of proficiency, they then switch to be taught Arabic dialects. Focus on dialects has increased since 2001. Some difficulties come from this: the use of Modern Standard Arabic is limited, while materials used in Arabic language teaching, such as films and reports produced by media based in the Middle East, come in various dialects that may not be fully comprehensible to speakers of MSA.

Other challenges remain despite the increasing investment in Arabic language programs. There is a lack of formal training to prepare and support the teachers for teaching Arabic. This affects the quality of the learning and hinders further development and maturity of the programs. This creates an issue as students of Arabic language programs can be composed of different backgrounds and speak different variations of the language. Deciding which form of the language to use for instruction and how to improve teaching techniques to be inclusive of all the students becomes important. Besides students from the different regions of the Arabic Muslim world, Arabic is also a language of Islam to non-Arab followers of Islam. The language could be used for communication for some while only being used during the practice of religion for others.

=== Heritage speakers ===
Heritage speakers of Arabic are undoubtedly a crucial constituent of the Arabic-speaking community of the USA. Arab Americans, almost 3.7 million strong as of 2023 according to census data provided by the Arab American Institute, do not all speak Arabic, and less than half are Muslim. Some scholars reported observing a swift transition from using Arabic to using English among Arab immigrant families in the US. Nevertheless, the Arabic language is still spoken by a great number of heritage speakers and is regarded as a symbol of ethnic or religious identity by many. The phenomenon of "code-switching", namely the mixed usage of English and Arabic words in a sentence while speaking, has been observed in an increasing number of Arab Americans. In the early years of the 2020s, an increase in heritage speakers enrolled in Arabic language lessons at universities has been observed.

Similar to other cultural minority groups in the U.S., by the third generation, it is predicted that English will become the primary language as the newer generation becomes more Americanized and assimilated into the western culture.

== See also ==
- Arab Americans
- History of the Middle Eastern people in Metro Detroit
