= Edward Salisbury =

Edward Salisbury may refer to:

- Edward James Salisbury (1886–1978), English botanist and ecologist
- Edward E. Salisbury (1814–1901), American Sanskritist

== See also ==
- Edward of Salisbury, nobleman and courtier
