= Kitab al-Majmu =

Arabic religious text

Kitab al-Majmu al-Ayad (Arabic: كتاب المجموع الإياد, romanized: Kitāb al-Majmūʿ al Ayād, lit. 'Book of the Collection of Blessings') is a book attributed to Abu Sa'id Maymun ibn al-Qasim al-Tabarani, that is believed to be a primary source of teaching of Alawism. This claim has been asserted by some Sunni Muslims and some Alawites. They claim the book is not openly published and instead is passed down from initiated Master to Apprentice; however, the book has been published by Western scholars, and both the original Arabic and French translation are available on the Internet Archive.

== History and translation ==
According to Matti Moosa:

Kitab al-Majmu contains sixteen suras (chapters) incorporated by Sulayman al-Adani in his Kitab al-Bakura... Kitab al-Majmu was published with a French translation by René Dussaud in his Histoire et Religion des Nosairis, 161-98. The Arabic text of the same is found in Abu Musa al-Hariri's al-Alawiyyun al-Alawiyya (Dubai: Dar al-Itisam, 1980), 145-74.

An English translation by Edward E. Salisbury was published in Journal of the American Oriental Society in 1866.

The man who revealed the alleged book was Sulayman al-Adani, an Alawite convert to Christianity.

It is also known as al-Dustoor, and has been attributed to an 11th-century Alawite missionary, al-Maymoun al-Tabarani; however, Yaron Friedman says that the Dustur and Kitab al-Majmu are different texts and their identification is a mistake.

Yaron Friedman suggests that Kitab al-Majmu was influenced by Jewish esoteric traditions found in the Sefer Yetzirah; Friedman in particular points to the similarity of the texts in their letter mysticism, comparing Sefer Yetzirah's "great secret" (sod gadol) of aleph-mem-shīn to Kitab al-Majmu's secret (sirr) of ʿayn-mīm-sīn.

Some Alawites insist that the Kitab al-Majmu is fabricated, some even suggesting that it is a forgery created by 19th century Christian missionaries.
