= Semitic languages =

Branch of the Afroasiatic languages

Semitic
- Geographic distribution: West Asia, North Africa, Horn of Africa, Malta
- Native speakers: c. 460 million
- Linguistic classification: Afro-Asiatic: Semitic
- Proto-language: Proto-Semitic
- Subdivisions: East Semitic †; West Semitic

Language codes
- ISO 639-2 / 5: sem
- Glottolog: semi1276
- Modern distribution of the Semitic languages

- Approximate historical distribution of Semitic languages

The Semitic languages are a branch of the Afroasiatic language family. They include Arabic, Amharic, Tigrinya, Tigre, Aramaic, Hebrew, Maltese, the Modern South Arabian languages and numerous other ancient and modern languages. They are spoken by more than 460 million people across much of West Asia, North Africa, (Note: Arabic is one of the world's largest languages, spoken natively in West Asia and Africa by about 411 million native speakers, and as a second language by perhaps another 60 million.) the Horn of Africa, (Note: Amharic is spoken natively by about 35 million speakers, and as a second language by perhaps another 25 million speakers, in Africa probably fewer than only Arabic, Swahili, Hausa, and Oromo, and is the second most populous Semitic language, after just Arabic. It is the lingua franca and constitutionally recognized national language of Ethiopia, and the national language of instruction of Ethiopian public education in the primary grades.) (Note: Tigrinya, not to be confused with the related but distinct language Tigre, is, like Amharic, a northern Ethiopian Semitic language, is spoken as a native language by the overwhelming majority of the population in the Tigre province of Ethiopia and in the highland part of Eritrea (the provinces of Akkele Guzay, Serae and Hamasien, where the capital of the state, Asmara, is situated). Outside of this area Tigrinya is also spoken in the Tambien and Wolqayt historical districts (Ethiopia) and in the administrative districts of Massara and Keren (Eritrea), these being respectively the southern and northern limits of its expansion. The number of speakers of Tigrinya has been estimated at 4 million in 1995; 1.3 million of them live in Eritrea (around 50 percent of the population of the country), in 2008 by an estimated 5 million. Hebrew speaking about ~5 million native/L1 speakers, Gurage has around 1.5 million speakers, Tigre has c. ~1.05 million speakers, Aramaic is spoken by around 575,000 to 1 million largely Assyrian speakers).) Malta, (Note: Maltese has around 483,000 speakers,) and in large immigrant and expatriate communities in North America, Europe, and Australasia. The terminology was first used in the 1780s by members of the Göttingen school of history, who derived the name from Shem (שם), one of the three sons of Noah in the Book of Genesis. Since the 19th century, alternative names, such as Syro-Arabian languages, have been proposed and used.

Arabic is by far the most widely spoken of the Semitic languages with 411 million native speakers of all varieties, and it is the most spoken native language in Africa and West Asia. Other Semitic languages include Amharic (35 million native speakers), Tigrinya (9.9 million speakers), Hebrew (5 million native speakers), Tigre (1 million speakers), and Maltese (570,000 speakers). Arabic, Amharic, Hebrew, Tigrinya, and Maltese are considered national languages with an official status.

Semitic languages occur in written form from a very early historical date in West Asia, with East Semitic Akkadian (also known as Assyrian and Babylonian) and Eblaite texts (written in a script adapted from Sumerian cuneiform) appearing from c. 2600 BCE in Mesopotamia and the northeastern Levant respectively. The only earlier attested languages are Sumerian and Elamite (2800 BCE to 550 BCE), both language isolates, and Egyptian (c. 3000 BCE), a sister branch within the Afroasiatic family, related to the Semitic languages but not part of them. Amorite appeared in Mesopotamia and the northern Levant c. 2100 BCE, followed by the mutually intelligible Canaanite languages (including Hebrew, Phoenician, Moabite, Edomite, and Ammonite, and perhaps Ekronite, Amalekite and Sutean), the still spoken Aramaic, and Ugaritic during the 2nd millennium BCE.

Most scripts used to write Semitic languages are abjads – a type of alphabetic script that omits some or all of the vowels, which is feasible for these languages because the consonants are the primary carriers of meaning in the Semitic languages. These include the Ugaritic, Phoenician, Aramaic, Hebrew, Syriac, Arabic, and ancient South Arabian alphabets. The Geʽez script, used for writing the Semitic languages of Ethiopia and Eritrea, is technically an abugida – a modified abjad in which vowels are notated using diacritic marks added to the consonants at all times, in contrast with other Semitic languages which indicate vowels based on need or for introductory purposes. Maltese is the only Semitic language written in the Latin script and the only Semitic language to be an official language of the European Union.

The Semitic languages are notable for their nonconcatenative morphology. That is, word roots are not themselves syllables or words, but instead are isolated sets of consonants (usually three, making a so-called triliteral root). Words are composed from roots not so much by adding prefixes or suffixes, but rather by filling in the vowels between the root consonants, although prefixes and suffixes are often added as well. For example, in Arabic, the root meaning "write" has the form k-t-b. From this root, words are formed by filling in the vowels and sometimes adding consonants, e.g. كِتاب kitāb 'book', كُتُب kutub 'books', كاتِب kātib 'writer', كُتّاب kuttāb 'writers', كَتَب kataba 'he wrote', يكتُب yaktubu 'he writes', etc or the Hebrew equivalent root K-T-B כתב forming words like כַתָב katav 'he wrote', יִכתוב yichtov 'he will write', כותֵב kotev 'he writes' or 'writer', מִכתָב michtav 'letter', הִכתִיב hichtiv 'he dictated', etc. The Hebrew Kaf alternatively becomes Khaf (as in Scottish "loch") depending on the letter preceding it.

== Name and identification ==
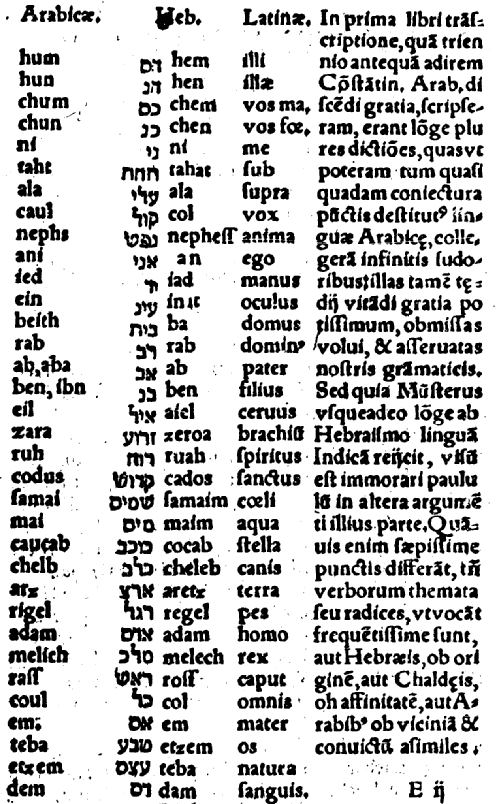
1538 comparison of Hebrew and Arabic, by Guillaume Postel – possibly the first such representation in Western European literature.

The similarity of the Hebrew, Arabic, and Aramaic languages has been accepted by all scholars since medieval times. The languages were familiar to Western European scholars due to historical contact with neighbouring Near Eastern countries and through Biblical studies, and a comparative analysis of Hebrew, Arabic, and Aramaic was published in Latin in 1538 by Guillaume Postel. Almost two centuries later, Hiob Ludolf described the similarities between these three languages and the Ethio-Semitic languages. However, neither scholar named this grouping as "Semitic".

The term "Semitic" was created by members of the Göttingen school of history, initially by August Ludwig von Schlözer (1781), to designate the languages closely related to Arabic, Aramaic, and Hebrew. The choice of name was derived from Shem, one of the three sons of Noah in the genealogical accounts of the biblical Book of Genesis, or more precisely from the Koine Greek rendering of the name, Σήμ (Sēm). Johann Gottfried Eichhorn is credited with popularising the term, particularly via a 1795 article "Semitische Sprachen" ("Semitic languages") in which he justified the terminology against criticism that Hebrew and Canaanite were the same language despite Canaan being "Hamitic" in the Table of Nations:

In the Mosaic Table of Nations, those names which are listed as Semites are purely names of tribes who speak the so-called Oriental languages and live in Southwest Asia. As far as we can trace the history of these very languages back in time, they have always been written with syllabograms or with alphabetic script (never with hieroglyphs or pictograms); and the legends about the invention of the syllabograms and alphabetic script go back to the Semites. In contrast, all so called Hamitic peoples originally used hieroglyphs, until they here and there, either through contact with the Semites, or through their settlement among them, became familiar with their syllabograms or alphabetic script, and partly adopted them. Viewed from this aspect too, with respect to the alphabet used, the name "Semitic languages" is completely appropriate.

Previously these languages had been commonly known as the "Oriental languages" in European literature. In the 19th century, "Semitic" became the conventional name; however, an alternative name, "Syro-Arabian languages", was later introduced by James Cowles Prichard and used by some writers.

== History ==
=== Ancient Semitic-speaking peoples ===
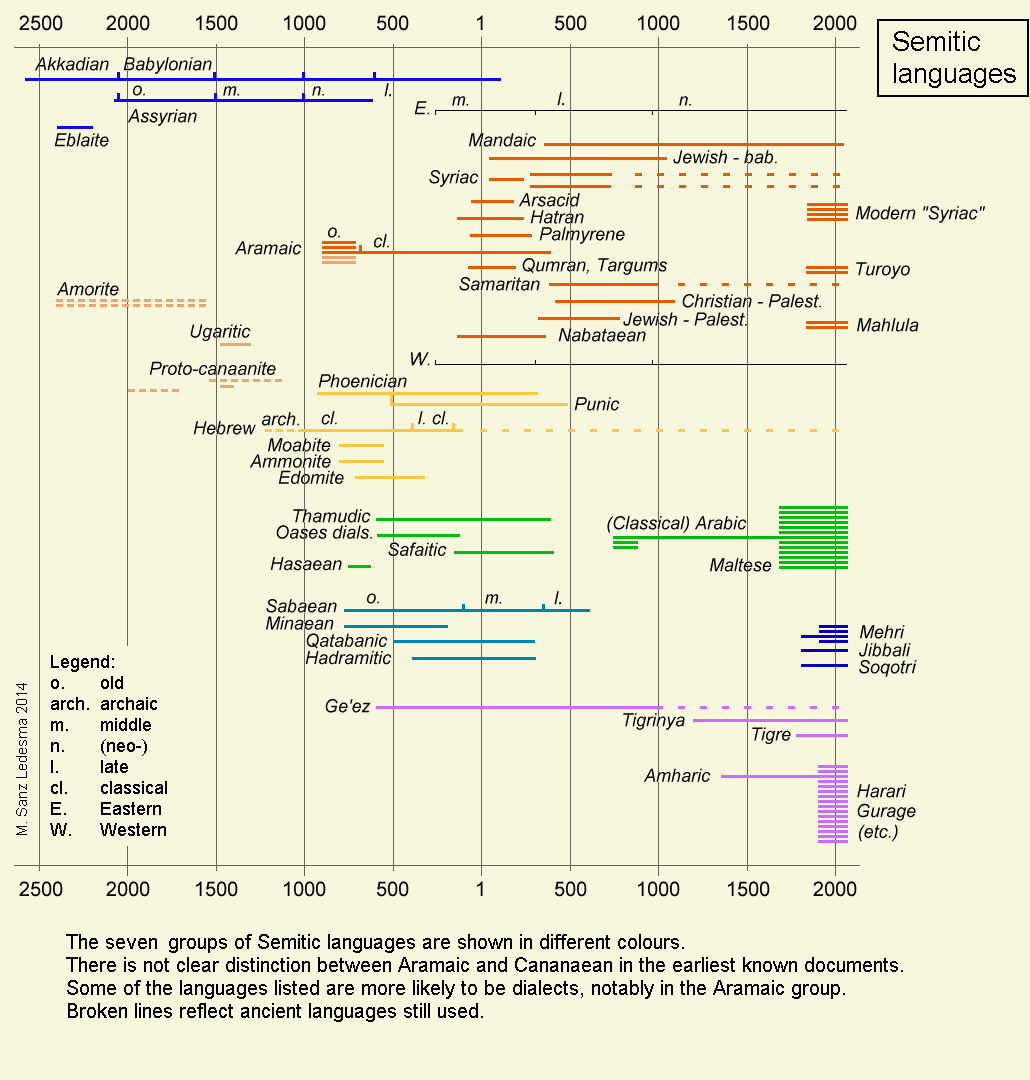
Chronology mapping of Semitic languages

Semitic languages were spoken and written across much of the West Asia and Asia Minor during the Bronze Age and Iron Age, the earliest attested being the East Semitic Akkadian of Mesopotamia (Akkad, Assyria, Isin, Larsa, and Babylonia) from the third millennium BC.

The origin of Semitic-speaking peoples is still under discussion. Several locations were proposed as possible sites of a prehistoric origin of Semitic-speaking peoples: Mesopotamia, the Levant, Ethiopia, the Eastern Mediterranean region, the Arabian Peninsula, and North Africa. According to a 2009 study, the Semitic languages originated in the Levant c. 3750 BC, and were introduced to the Horn of Africa c. 800 BC from the southern Arabian Peninsula. Others assign the arrival of Semitic speakers in the Horn of Africa to a much earlier date. According to another hypothesis, Semitic originated from an offshoot of a still earlier language in North Africa; desertification led to emigration in the fourth millennium BC to both what is now Ethiopia and northeast out of Africa into West Asia.

The various extremely closely related and mutually intelligible Canaanite languages, a branch of the Northwest Semitic languages included Edomite, Hebrew, Ammonite, Moabite, Phoenician (Punic/Carthaginian), Samaritan Hebrew, and Ekronite. They were spoken in what is today Israel and the Palestinian territories, Syria, Lebanon, Jordan, the northern Sinai Peninsula, some northern and eastern parts of the Arabian Peninsula, southwest fringes of Turkey, and in the case of Phoenician, coastal regions of Tunisia (Carthage), Libya, Algeria, and parts of Morocco, Spain, and possibly in Malta and other Mediterranean islands. Ugaritic, a Northwest Semitic language closely related to but distinct from the Canaanite group was spoken in the kingdom of Ugarit in north western Syria.

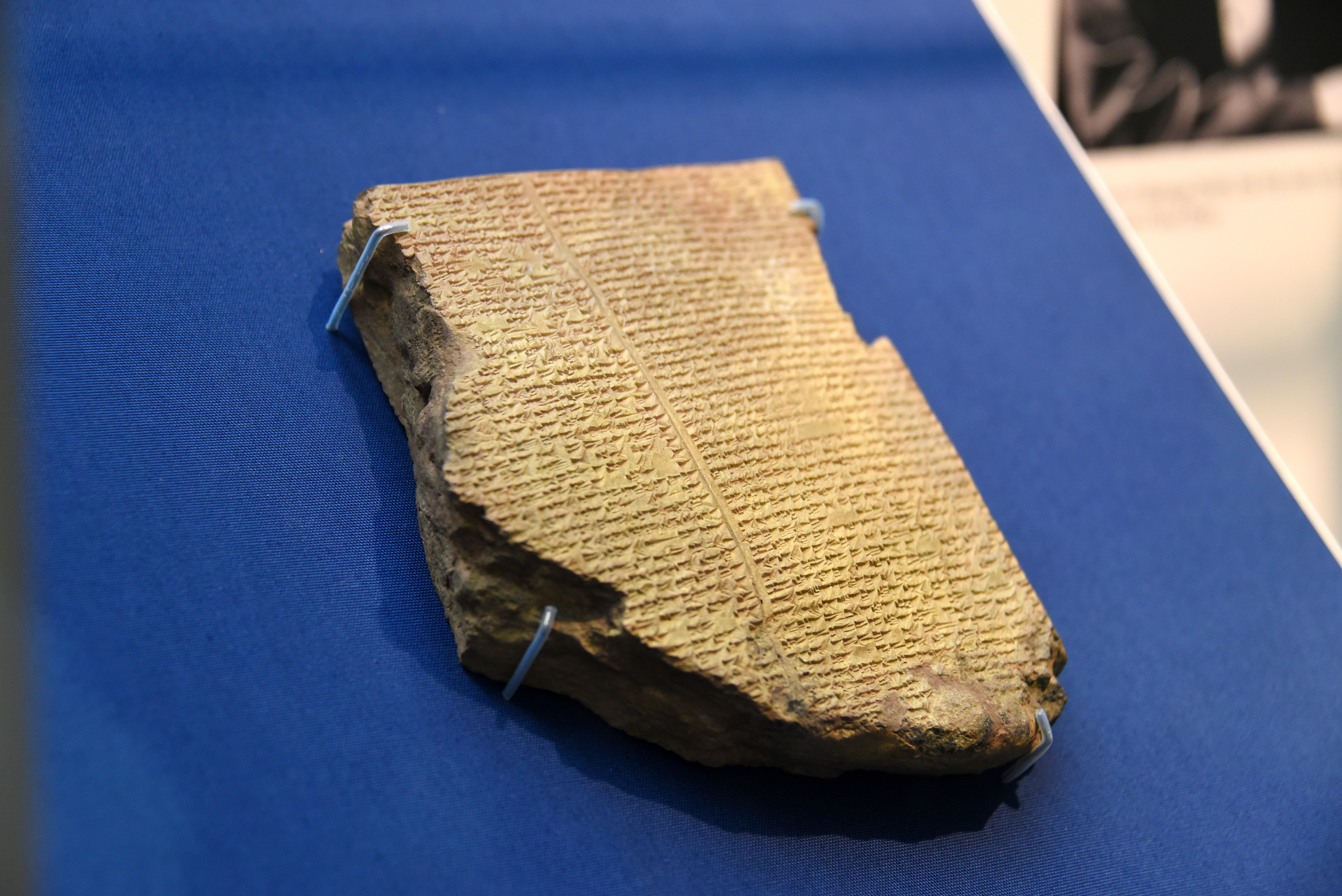
Epic of Gilgamesh, an epic poem from ancient Mesopotamia, regarded as the earliest surviving notable literature, written in Akkadian.

A hybrid Canaano-Akkadian language also emerged in Canaan (Israel and the Palestinian territories, Jordan, Lebanon) during the 14th century BC, incorporating elements of the Mesopotamian East Semitic Akkadian language of Assyria and Babylonia with the West Semitic Canaanite languages.

Aramaic, a still living ancient Northwest Semitic language, first attested in the 12th century BC in the northern Levant, gradually replaced the East Semitic and Canaanite languages across much of the Near East, particularly after being adopted as the lingua franca of the vast Neo-Assyrian Empire (911–605 BC) by Tiglath-Pileser III during the 8th century BC, and being retained by the succeeding Neo-Babylonian and Achaemenid Empires.

The Chaldean language (not to be confused with Aramaic or its Biblical variant, sometimes referred to as Chaldean) was a Northwest Semitic language, possibly closely related to Aramaic, but no examples of the language remain, as after settling in south eastern Mesopotamia from the Levant during the 9th century BC, the Chaldeans appear to have rapidly adopted the Akkadian and Aramaic languages of the indigenous Mesopotamians.

Old South Arabian languages (classified as South Semitic and therefore distinct from the Central-Semitic Arabic) were spoken in the kingdoms of Dilmun, Sheba, Ubar, Socotra, and Magan, which in modern terms encompassed part of the eastern coast of Saudi Arabia, and Bahrain, Qatar, Oman, and Yemen. South Semitic languages are thought to have spread to the Horn of Africa circa 8th century BC where the Geʽez language emerged (though the direction of influence remains uncertain).

=== First century to twentieth century CE ===
Example of Arabic calligraphy

Classical Syriac, a 200 CE Eastern Middle Aramaic dialect, used as a liturgical language in Mesopotamia, the Levant, and Kerala, India, rose to importance as a literary language of early Christianity in the third to fifth centuries and continued into the early Islamic era.

The Arabic language, although originating in the Arabian Peninsula, first emerged in written form in the 1st to 4th centuries CE in the southern regions of The Levant. With the advent of the early Arab conquests of the seventh and eighth centuries, Classical Arabic eventually replaced many (but not all) of the indigenous Semitic languages and cultures of the Near East. Both the Near East and North Africa saw an influx of Muslim Arabs from the Arabian Peninsula, followed later by non-Semitic Muslim Iranian and Turkic peoples. The previously dominant Aramaic dialects maintained by the Assyrians, Babylonians and Persians gradually began to be sidelined, however descendant dialects of Eastern Aramaic (including Suret (Assyrian and Chaldean varieties), Turoyo, and Mandaic) survive to this day among the Assyrians and Mandaeans of northern and southern Iraq, northwestern Iran, northeastern Syria and southeastern Turkey, with up to a million fluent speakers. Syriac is a recognized language in Iraq, furthermore, Mesopotamian Arabic is one of the most Syriac influenced dialects of Arabic, due to Syriac, the dialect of Edessa specifically, having originated in Mesopotamia. Meanwhile Western Aramaic is now only spoken by a few thousand Christian and Muslim Arameans (Syriacs) in western Syria. The Arabs spread their Central Semitic language to North Africa (Egypt, Libya, Tunisia, Algeria, Morocco, and northern Sudan and Mauritania), where it gradually replaced Egyptian Coptic and many Berber languages (although Berber is still largely extant in many areas), and for a time to the Iberian Peninsula (modern Spain, Portugal, and Gibraltar) and Malta.

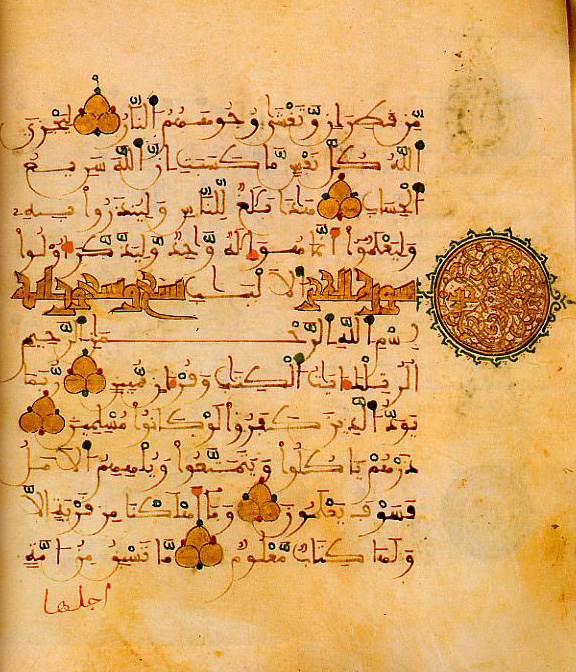
Page from a 12th-century Quran in Arabic

With the patronage of the caliphs and the prestige of its liturgical status, Arabic rapidly became one of the world's main literary languages. Its spread among the masses took much longer, however, as many (although not all) of the native populations outside the Arabian Peninsula only gradually abandoned their languages in favour of Arabic. As Bedouin tribes settled in conquered areas, it became the main language of not only central Arabia, but also Yemen, the Fertile Crescent, and Egypt. Most of the Maghreb followed, specifically in the wake of the Banu Hilal's incursion in the 11th century, and Arabic became the native language of many inhabitants of al-Andalus. After the collapse of the Nubian kingdom of Dongola in the 14th century, Arabic began to spread south of Egypt into modern Sudan; soon after, the Beni Ḥassān brought Arabization to Mauritania. A number of Modern South Arabian languages distinct from Arabic still survive, such as Soqotri, Mehri and Shehri which are mainly spoken in Socotra, Yemen, and Oman.

Meanwhile, the Semitic languages that had arrived from southern Arabia in the 8th century BC were diversifying in Ethiopia and Eritrea, where, under heavy Cushitic influence, they split into a number of languages, including Amharic and Tigrinya. With the expansion of Ethiopia under the Solomonic dynasty, Amharic, previously a minor local language, spread throughout much of the country, replacing both Semitic (such as Gafat) and non-Semitic (such as Weyto) languages, and replacing Geʽez as the principal literary language (though Geʽez remains the liturgical language for Christians and Jews of Ethiopean descent in the region); this spread continues to this day, with Qimant set to disappear in another generation.

== Present distribution ==
Approximate distribution of the Semitic languages around the 1st century AD

Arabic is currently the native language of majorities from Mauritania to Oman, and from Iraq to Sudan. Classical Arabic is the language of the Quran. It is also studied widely in the non-Arabic-speaking Muslim world. The Maltese language is a descendant of the extinct Siculo-Arabic, a variety of Maghrebi Arabic formerly spoken in Sicily. The modern Maltese alphabet is based on the Latin script with the addition of some letters with diacritic marks and digraphs. Maltese is the only Semitic official language within the European Union.

Successful as second languages far beyond their numbers of contemporary first-language speakers, a few Semitic languages today are the base of the sacred literature of some of the world's major religions, including Islam (Arabic), Judaism (Hebrew and Aramaic (Biblical and Talmudic)), churches of Syriac Christianity (Classical Syriac) and Ethiopian and Eritrean Orthodox Christianity (Geʽez). Millions learn these as a second language (or an archaic version of their modern tongues): many Muslims learn to read and recite the Qur'an and Jews speak and study Biblical Hebrew, the language of the Torah, Midrash, and other Jewish scriptures. The followers of the Assyrian Church of the East, Chaldean Catholic Church, Ancient Church of the East, Assyrian Pentecostal Church, Assyrian Evangelical Church, and the Syriac Orthodox Church speak Eastern Aramaic languages and use Classical Syriac as their liturgical language. Classical Syriac is also used liturgically by the primarily Arabic-speaking followers of the Maronite Church, Syriac Catholic Church, and was originally the liturgical language of the Melkites in Antioch, and ancient Syria. Koine Greek and Classical Arabic are the main liturgical languages of Eastern Orthodox Christians in the Middle East, who compose the patriarchates of Antioch, Jerusalem, and Alexandria. Mandaic is both spoken and used as a liturgical language by the Mandaeans. Although the majority of Neo-Aramaic dialects spoken today are descended from Eastern varieties, Western Neo-Aramaic is still spoken in two villages in Syria. Despite the ascendancy of Arabic in the Middle East, other Semitic languages still exist.

Biblical Hebrew, long extinct as a colloquial language and in use only as a Jewish literary, intellectual, and liturgical language, was revived in spoken form at the end of the 19th century. Modern Hebrew is the main language of Israel, with easily understandable Biblical Hebrew remaining as the language of the Bible, Jewish liturgy and religious scholarship of Jews worldwide. Modern Hebrew is the only example of an ancient tongue revived in modern times to become a vibrant, modern language used by Israel's 10 million citizens and many more in other countries.

In Arab-dominated Yemen and Oman, on the southern rim of the Arabian Peninsula, a few tribes continue to speak Modern South Arabian languages such as Mahri and Soqotri. These languages differ greatly from both the surrounding Arabic dialects and from the languages of the Old South Arabian inscriptions.

Historically linked to the peninsular homeland of Old South Arabian, of which only one language, Razihi, remains, Ethiopia and Eritrea contain a substantial number of Semitic languages; the most widely spoken are Amharic in Ethiopia, Tigre in Eritrea, and Tigrinya in both. Amharic is the official language of Ethiopia. Tigrinya is a working language in Eritrea. Tigre is spoken by over one million people in the northern and central Eritrean lowlands and parts of eastern Sudan. A number of Gurage languages are spoken by populations in the semi-mountainous region of central Ethiopia, while Harari is restricted to the city of Harar. Geʽez remains the liturgical language for certain groups of Christians in Ethiopia and in Eritrea and Ethiopean Jews.

== Phonology ==
The phonologies of the attested Semitic languages are presented here from a comparative point of view (see Proto-Semitic language#Phonology for details on the phonological reconstruction of Proto-Semitic used in this article). The reconstruction of Proto-Semitic (PS) was originally based primarily on Arabic, whose phonology and morphology (particularly in Classical Arabic) is very conservative, and which preserves as contrastive 28 out of the evident 29 consonantal phonemes. with *s [s] and *š [ʃ] merging into Arabic /s/ ⟨س⟩ and *ś [ɬ] becoming Arabic /ʃ/ ⟨ش⟩.

Proto-Semitic consonant phonemes
Type	Manner	Voicing	Labial	Interdental	Alveolar	Palatal	Lateral	Velar/Uvular	Pharyngeal	Glottal
Obstruent	Stop	voiceless	*p [p]		*t [t]			*k [k]		
Obstruent	Stop	emphatic	(pʼ) (Note: Woodard (2008, p. 219) suggests the presence of an emphatic p in some disparate Semitic languages may indicate that such an emphatic was present in Proto-Semitic.)		*ṭ [tʼ]			*q/ḳ [kʼ]		*ʼ,ˀ [ʔ]
Obstruent	Stop	voiced	*b [b]		*d [d]			*g [ɡ]		
Obstruent	Fricative	voiceless		*ṯ [θ]	*s [s]	*š [ʃ]	*ś [ɬ]	*ḫ [x~χ]	*ḥ [ħ]	*h [h]
Obstruent	Fricative	emphatic		*ṱ (Note: The emphatic interdental fricative is usually spelled *ṯ̣ but is replaced here by *ṱ for better readability.)/θ̣/ẓ [θʼ]	*ṣ [sʼ]		*ṣ́/ḏ̣ [ɬʼ]	(xʼ~χʼ) (Note: Huehnergard (2003, p. 49) presents a minority opinion that an ejective velar fricative existed in Proto-Semitic.)		
Obstruent	Fricative	voiced		*ḏ [ð]	*z [z]			*ġ/ǵ [ɣ~ʁ]	*ʻ,ˤ [ʕ]	
Resonant	Trill				*r [r]					
Resonant	Approximant		*w [w]			*y [j]	*l [l]			
Resonant	Nasal		*m [m]		*n [n]					

Note: the fricatives *s, *z, *ṣ, *ś, *ṣ́, and *ṱ may also be interpreted as affricates (/t͡s/, /d͡z/, /t͡sʼ/, /t͡ɬ/, /t͡ɬʼ/, and /t͡θʼ/), as discussed in Proto-Semitic language § Fricatives.

This comparative approach is natural for the consonants, as sound correspondences among the consonants of the Semitic languages are very straightforward for a family of its time depth. Sound shifts affecting the vowels are more numerous and, at times, less regular.

=== Consonants ===
Each Proto-Semitic phoneme was reconstructed to explain a certain regular sound correspondence between various Semitic languages. Note that Latin letter values (italicized) for extinct languages are a question of transcription; the exact pronunciation is not recorded.

Most of the attested languages have merged a number of the reconstructed original fricatives, though South Arabian retains all fourteen (and has added a fifteenth from *p > f).

In Aramaic and Hebrew, all non-emphatic stops occurring singly after a vowel were softened to fricatives, leading to an alternation that was often later phonemicized as a result of the loss of gemination.

In languages exhibiting pharyngealization of emphatics, the original velar emphatic has rather developed to a uvular stop [q].

Regular correspondences of the Proto-Semitic consonants
Proto Semitic	IPA	Ancient South Arabian	Ancient North Arabian	Modern South Arabian^{15}	Arabic				Maltese		Akkadian	Ugaritic		Phoenician			Hebrew							Aramaic			Geʽez		
Proto Semitic	IPA	Written	Written	Pronun.	Written	Translit.	Pronun.		Written	Pronun.	Translit.	Written	Pronun.	Written	Pronun.	Translit.	Written	Translit.	Pronun.		Samaritan Hebrew			Imperial	Syriac	Translit.	Written	Pronounced	Translit.
Proto Semitic	IPA	Written	Written	Pronun.	Written	Translit.	Classical	Modern Standard	Written	Pronun.	Translit.	Written	Pronun.	Written	Pronun.	Translit.	Written	Translit.	Classical	Modern	Written	Translit.	Pronun.	Imperial	Syriac	Translit.	Written	Pronounced	Translit.
*b	[b]	𐩨	𐪈	/b/	ب	b	/b/		b	/b/	b	𐎁	b	𐤁	/b/	b	ב	b, ḇ^{5}	/b/, /β/^{5}	/b/, /v/	ࠁ	b	/b/	𐡁	ܒ	ḇ, b^{5}	በ	/b/	b
*g	[ɡ]	𐩴	𐪔	/g ~ d͡ʒ/	ج	ǧ	/ɟ ~ d͡ʒ/^{9}	/d͡ʒ/^{11}	ġ	/d͡ʒ/	g	𐎂	g	𐤂	/ɡ/	g	ג	g, ḡ^{5}	/ɡ/, /ɣ/^{5}	/ɡ/	ࠂ	g	/ɡ/	𐡂	ܓ	ḡ, g^{5}	ገ	/ɡ/	g
*p	[p]	𐩰	𐪐	/f/	ف	f	/f/		f	/f/	p	𐎔	p	𐤐	/p/	p	פ	p, p̄^{5}	/pʰ/, /ɸ/^{5}	/p/, /f/	ࠐ	f	/f/	𐡐	ܦ	p̄, p^{5}	ፈ	/f/	f
*k	[k]	𐩫	𐪋	/k/	ك	k	/k/		k	/k/	k	𐎋	k	𐤊	/k/	k	כ	k, ḵ^{5}	/kʰ/, /x/^{5}	/k/, /x/	ࠊ	k	/k/	𐡊	ܟ	ḵ, k^{5}	ከ	/k/	k
*ḳ	[kʼ]	𐩤	𐪄	/kʼ/	ق	q	/q/		q	/ʔ ~ q/	q	𐎖	ḳ	𐤒	/q/	q	ק	ḳ	/kˤ/ ~ /q/	/k/	ࠒ	q	/q/	𐡒	ܩ	q	ቀ	/kʼ/	ḳ
*d	[d]	𐩵	𐪕	/d/	د	d	/d/		d	/d/	d	𐎄	d	𐤃	/d/	d	ד	d, ḏ^{5}	/d/, /ð/^{5}	/d/	ࠃ	d	/d/	𐡃	ܕ	ḏ, d^{5}	ደ	/d/	d
*ḏ	[ð]	𐩹	𐪙	/ð/	ذ	ḏ	/ð/		d	/d/	z	𐎏	ḏ > d	𐤆	/z/	z	ז	z	/z/	/z/	ࠆ	z	/z/	𐡆^{3}, 𐡃	ܙ^{3}, ܕ	ḏ^{3}, d	ዘ	/z/	z
*z	[z]	𐩸	𐪘	/z/	ز	z	/z/		ż	/z/	z	𐎇	z	𐤆	/z/	z	ז	z	/z/	/z/	ࠆ	z	/z/	𐡆	ܙ	z	ዘ	/z/	z
*s (s_{3})	[s] / [ts]	𐩯	𐪏	/s/	س	s	/s/		s	/s/	s	𐎒	s	𐤎	/s/	s	ס	s	/s/	/s/	ࠎ	s	/s/	𐡎	ܣ	s	ሰ	/s/	s
*š (s_{1})	[ʃ] / [s]	𐩪	𐪊	/ʃ/, /h/	س	s	/s/		s	/s/	š	𐎌	š	𐤔	/ʃ/	š	שׁ	š	/ʃ/	/ʃ/	ࠔ	š	/ʃ/	𐡔	ܫ	š	ሰ	/s/	s
*ś (s_{2})	[ɬ]	𐩦	𐪆	/ɬ/	ش	š	/ʃ/		x	/ʃ/	š	𐎌	š	𐤔	/ʃ/	š	שׂ^{1}	ś^{1}	/ɬ/	/s/	ࠔ	š	/ʃ/	𐡔^{3}, 𐡎	ܫ^{3}, ܣ	ś^{3}, s	ሠ	/ɬ/	ś
*ṯ	[θ]	𐩻	𐪛	/θ/	ث	ṯ	/θ/		t	/t/	š	𐎘	ṯ	𐤔	/ʃ/	š	שׁ	š	/ʃ/	/ʃ/	ࠔ	š	/ʃ/	𐡔^{3}, 𐡕	ܫ^{3}, ܬ	ṯ^{3}, t	ሰ	/s/	s
*t	[t]	𐩩	𐪉	/t/	ت	t	/t/		t	/t/	t	𐎚	t	𐤕	t	t	ת	t, ṯ^{5}	/tʰ/, /θ/^{5}	/t/	ࠕ	t	/t/	𐡕	ܬ	ṯ, t^{5}	ተ	/t/	t
*ṭ	[tʼ]	𐩷	𐪗	/tʼ/	ط	ṭ	/tˤ/		t	/t/	ṭ	𐎉	ṭ	𐤈	/tˤ/	ṭ	ט	ṭ	/tˤ/	/t/	ࠈ	ṭ	/tˤ/	𐡈	ܛ	ṭ	ጠ	/tʼ/	ṭ
*ṱ	[θʼ]	𐩼	𐪜	/θʼ ~ ðʼ/	ظ	ẓ	/ðˤ/		d	/d/	ṣ	𐎑	ẓ^{12} > ġ	𐤑	/sˤ/	ṣ	צ	ṣ	/sˤ/	/t͡s/	ࠑ	ṣ	/sˤ/	𐡑^{3}, 𐡈	ܨ^{3}, ܛ	ṯʼ^{3}, ṭ	ጸ	/t͡sʼ/	ṣ
*ṣ	[sʼ]	𐩮	𐪎	/sʼ/, /ʃʼ/^{15}	ص	ṣ	/sˤ/		s	/s/	ṣ	𐎕	ṣ	𐤑	/sˤ/	ṣ	צ	ṣ	/sˤ/	/t͡s/	ࠑ	ṣ	/sˤ/	𐡑	ܨ	ṣ	ጸ	/t͡sʼ/	ṣ
*ṣ́	[ɬʼ]	𐩳	𐪓	/ɬʼ/	ض	ḍ	/ɮˤ ~ dˤ/	/dˤ/	d	/d/	ṣ	𐎕	ṣ	𐤑	/sˤ/	ṣ	צ	ṣ	/sˤ/	/t͡s/	ࠑ	ṣ	/sˤ/	𐡒^{3}, 𐡏	ܩ^{3}, ܥ	*ġʼ^{3}, ʻ	ፀ	/t͡ɬʼ/	ḍ
*ġ	[ɣ]~[ʁ]	𐩶	𐪖	/ʁ/	غ	ḡ	/ɣ ~ ʁ/		għ	/ˤː/	ḫ	𐎙	ġ,ʻ	𐤏	/ʕ/	ʻ	ע^{2}	ʻ^{2}	/ʁ/	/ʕ/ ~ /ʔ/ ~ ∅^{14}	ࠏ	ʻ	/ʕ/, /ʔ/ ~ ∅	𐡏^{3}	ܥ^{3}	ġ^{3}, ʻ	ዐ	/ʕ/	ʻ
*ʻ	[ʕ]	𐩲	𐪒	/ʕ/	ع	ʻ	/ʕ/		għ	/ˤː/	–^{4}	𐎓	ʻ	𐤏	/ʕ/	ʻ	ע^{2}	ʻ^{2}	/ʕ/	/ʕ/ ~ /ʔ/ ~ ∅^{14}	ࠏ	ʻ	/ʕ/, /ʔ/ ~ ∅	𐡏	ܥ	ʻ	ዐ	/ʕ/	ʻ
*ʼ	[ʔ]	𐩱	𐪑	/ʔ/	ء	ʼ	/ʔ/		–	–	–, ʾ	𐎀, 𐎛, 𐎜	ʼa, ʼi, ʼu^{10}	𐤀	/ʔ/	ʼ	א	ʼ	/ʔ/	/ʔ/ ~ ∅	ࠀ	ʼ	/ʔ/ ~ ∅	𐡀	ܐ	ʼ	አ	/ʔ/	ʼ
*ḫ	[x]~[χ]	𐩭	𐪍	/χ/	خ	ẖ	/x ~ χ/		ħ	/ħ/	ḫ	𐎃	ḫ	𐤇	/ħ/	ḥ	ח^{2}	ḥ^{2}	/χ/	/χ/ ~ /ħ/^{14}	ࠇ	ḥ	/ʕ/, /ʔ/ ~ ∅	𐡇^{3}	ܚ^{3}	ḫ^{3}, ḥ	ኀ	/χ/	ḫ
*ḥ	[ħ]	𐩢	𐪂	/ħ/	ح	ḥ	/ħ/		ħ	/ħ/	–^{4}	𐎈	ḥ	𐤇	/ħ/	ḥ	ח^{2}	ḥ^{2}	/ħ/	/χ/ ~ /ħ/^{14}	ࠇ	ḥ	/ʕ/, /ʔ/ ~ ∅	𐡇	ܚ	ḥ	ሐ	/ħ/	ḥ
*h	[h]	𐩠	𐪀	/h/	ه	h	/h/		h	/ː/	–	𐎅	h	𐤄	/h/	h	ה	h	/h/	/h/ ~ ∅	ࠄ	h	/ʔ/ ~ ∅	𐡄	ܗ	h	ሀ	/h/	h
*m	[m]	𐩣	𐪃	/m/	م	m	/m/		m	/m/	m	𐎎	m	𐤌	/m/	m	מ	m	/m/	/m/	ࠌ	m	/m/	𐡌	ܡ	m	መ	/m/	m
*n	[n]	𐩬	𐪌	/n/	ن	n	/n/		n	/n/	n	𐎐	n	𐤍	/n/	n	נ	n	/n/	/n/	ࠍ	n	/n/	𐡍	ܢ	n	ነ	/n/	n
*r	[ɾ]	𐩧	𐪇	/r/	ر	r	/r/		r	/r/	r	𐎗	r	𐤓	/r/	r	ר	r	/r/	/ʁ/	ࠓ	r	/ʁ/	𐡓	ܪ	r	ረ	/r/	r
*l	[l]	𐩡	𐪁	/l/	ل	l	/l/		l	/l/	l	𐎍	l	𐤋	/l/	l	ל	l	/l/	/l/	ࠋ	l	/l/	𐡋	ܠ	l	ለ	/l/	l
*w	[w]	𐩥	𐪅	/w/	و	w	/w/		w	/w/	w	𐎆	w	𐤅	/w/	w	ו	w	/ʋ/	/v/ ~ /w/	ࠅ	w	/b/	𐡅	ܘ	w	ወ	/w/	w
*y	[j]	𐩺	𐪚	/j/	ي	y	/j/		j	/j/	y	𐎊	y	𐤉	/j/	y	י	y	/j/	/j/	ࠉ	y	/j/	𐡉	ܝ	y	የ	/j/	y

Note: the fricatives *s, *z, *ṣ, *ś, *ṣ́, and *ṱ may also be interpreted as affricates (/t͡s/, /d͡z/, /t͡sʼ/, /t͡ɬ/, /t͡ɬʼ/, and /t͡θʼ/).

Notes:

1. Proto-Semitic *ś was still pronounced as [ɬ] in Biblical Hebrew, but no letter was available in the Early Linear Script, so the letter ש did double duty, representing both /ʃ/ and /ɬ/. Later on, however, /ɬ/ merged with /s/, but the old spelling was largely retained, and the two pronunciations of ש were distinguished graphically in Tiberian Hebrew as שׁ /ʃ/ vs. שׂ /s/ < /ɬ/.
2. Biblical Hebrew as of the 3rd century BCE apparently still distinguished the phonemes ġ /ʁ/ and ḫ /χ/ from ʻ /ʕ/ and ḥ /ħ/, respectively, based on transcriptions in the Septuagint. As in the case of /ɬ/, no letters were available to represent these sounds, and existing letters did double duty: ח /χ/ /ħ/ and ע /ʁ/ /ʕ/. In both of these cases, however, the two sounds represented by the same letter eventually merged, leaving no evidence (other than early transcriptions) of the former distinctions.
3. Although early Aramaic (pre-7th century BCE) had only 22 consonants in its alphabet, it apparently distinguished all of the original 29 Proto-Semitic phonemes, including *ḏ, *ṯ, *ṱ, *ś, *ṣ́, *ġ, and *ḫ – although by Middle Aramaic times, these had all merged with other sounds. This conclusion is mainly based on the shifting representation of words etymologically containing these sounds; in early Aramaic writing, the first five are merged with z, š, ṣ, š, and q respectively, but later with d, t, ṭ, s, and ʿ. (Also note that due to begadkefat spirantization, which occurred after this merger, OAm. t > ṯ and d > ḏ in some positions, so that PS *t,ṯ and *d, ḏ may be realized as either of t, ṯ and d, ḏ respectively.) The sounds *ġ and *ḫ were always represented using the pharyngeal letters ʿ and ḥ, but they are distinguished from the pharyngeals in the Demotic-script papyrus Amherst 63, written about 200 BCE. This suggests that these sounds, too, were distinguished in Old Aramaic language, but written using the same letters as they later merged with.
4. The earlier pharyngeals can be distinguished in Akkadian from the zero reflexes of *ḥ, *ʕ by e-coloring adjacent *a, e.g. pS *ˈbaʕal-um 'owner, lord' > Akk. bēlu(m).
5. Hebrew and Aramaic underwent begadkefat spirantization at a certain point, whereby the stop sounds /b ɡ d k p t/ were softened to the corresponding fricatives [v ɣ ð x f θ] (written ḇ ḡ ḏ ḵ p̄ ṯ) when occurring after a vowel and not geminated. This change probably happened after the original Old Aramaic phonemes /θ, ð/ disappeared in the 7th century BCE, and most likely occurred after the loss of Hebrew /χ, ʁ/ c. 200 BCE. (Note: According to the generally accepted view, it is unlikely that begadkefat spirantization occurred before the merger of /χ, ʁ/ and /ħ, ʕ/, or else [x, χ] and [ɣ, ʁ] would have to be contrastive, which is cross-linguistically rare. However, Blau argues that it is possible that lenited /k/ and /χ/ could coexist even if pronounced identically, since one would be recognized as an alternating allophone (as apparently is the case in Nestorian Syriac).) It is known to have occurred in Hebrew by the 2nd century CE. After a certain point this alternation became contrastive in word-medial and final position (though bearing low functional load), but in word-initial position they remained allophonic. In Modern Hebrew, the distinction has a higher functional load due to the loss of gemination, although only the three fricatives /v χ f/ are still preserved (the fricative /x/ is pronounced /χ/ in modern Hebrew). Samaritan Hebrew hasn't undergone this process at all.
6. In the Northwest Semitic languages, */w/ became */j/ at the beginning of a word, e.g. Hebrew yeled "boy" < *wald (cf. Arabic walad).
7. There is evidence of a rule of assimilation of /j/ to the following coronal consonant in pre-tonic position, shared by Hebrew, Phoenician, and Aramaic.
8. In Assyrian Neo-Aramaic, [ħ] is nonexistent. In general cases, the language would lack pharyngeal fricative [ʕ] (as heard in Ayin). However, /ʕ/ is retained in educational speech, especially among Assyrian priests.
9. The palatalization of Proto-Semitic gīm /g/ to Arabic /d͡ʒ/ jīm, might be connected to the pronunciation of qāf /q/ as a /g/ gāf in most of the Arabian peninsula; since in most of the colloquial dialects of the Arabian Peninsula ج is pronounced jīm /d͡ʒ/ and ق is pronounced gāf /g/, except in western and southern Yemen and parts of Oman where ج is gīm /g/ and ق is qāf /q/.
10. Ugaritic orthography indicated the vowel after the glottal stop.
11. The Arabic letter jīm (ج) has three main pronunciations in Modern Standard Arabic. [d͡ʒ] in north Algeria, Iraq, also in most of the Arabian peninsula and as the predominant pronunciation of Literary Arabic outside the Arab world, [ʒ] occurs in most of the Levant and most North Africa; and [ɡ] is used in northern Egypt and some regions in Yemen and Oman. In addition to other minor allophones.
12. ṱ can be written ẓ, and always is in the Ugaritic and Arabic contexts. In Ugaritic, sometimes assimilates to ġ, as in ġmʔ 'thirsty' (Arabic ẓmʔ, Hebrew ṣmʔ, but Ugaritic mẓmủ 'thirsty', root ẓmʔ, is also attested).
13. Early Amharic might have had a different phonology.
14. The pronunciations /ʕ/ and /ħ/ for ʿAyin and Ḥet, respectively, still occur among some older Mizrahi speakers, but for most modern Israelis, ʿAyin and Ḥet are realized as /ʔ, -/ and /χ ~ x/, respectively.
15. the correspondence between Proto-Semitic phonemes and Modern South Arabian languages is not one-to-one, since some phonemes have merged, some phonemes have changed their pronunciation and some phonemes were split depending on the language, for example the phoneme /ʃʼ/ appears to be connected to different phonological developments.

==== Plain sibilants ====
Sibilants have been one of the aspects of Semitic phonology that historical linguists have taken the most interest in, and Semiticists are nearly unanimous in the opinion that Proto-Semitic contained three plain sibilants, referred to by the shorthand S_{1}, S_{2}, and S_{3}, or as š, ś, and s. The realizations of these phonemes in earlier times is debated, with hypotheses ranging from a palatal [ɕ] for S_{1}, and [s̠] or [ts] for S_{3}, to plain [ʃ] for S_{1} and [s] for S_{3}.

Interestingly, the point of least controversy is the realization of S_{2}, widely accepted to be lateral [ɬ], In spite of the fact that this phoneme has completely merged with S_{1} or S_{3} in every other Semitic language outside of Modern South Arabian languages, such that the most widely-spoken Semitic languages (Arabic, Amharic, Hebrew and Tigrinya) have a two-way sibilant distinction rather than the original three-way distinction. This merger occurred at different times, and in different ways across Semitic which has led to the non-correspondence of, for example, Arabic, Hebrew and Shehri (Jibbali) words for 'ten' from Proto-Semitic (ʕ-s₂-r).

Proto-Semitic	ʕ-s₂-r (ten)
Arabic	/ʕa.ʃa.ra(t)/
Hebrew	/ʕa.sa.ra(t)/
Shehri (Jibbali)	/ʕə.ɬɛ.ret/

Proto-Semitic		Old South Arabian	Old North Arabian	Modern South Arabian	Arabic		Aramaic		Modern Hebrew		Ge'ez		Phoenician		Akkadian
s₃ (s)	[s] / [ts]	𐩯	𐪏	/s/	س	/s/	ס	s	ס	/s/	ሰ	s	𐤎	s	s
s₁ (š)	[ʃ] / [s]	𐩪	𐪊	/ʃ/, sometimes /h/^{1}	س	/s/	ש	š	שׁ	/ʃ/	ሰ	s	𐤔	š	š
s₂ (ś)	[ɬ]	𐩦	𐪆	/ɬ/	ش	/ʃ/	ס	s	שׂ	/s/	ሠ	ś	𐤔	š	š

Notes: s₁ (š) is [ʃ], sometimes [h] and [j^{ɦ}] (in Soqotri) - [ʃ] and [ɕ^{w}] (for some speakers of Jibbali).

The following table shows the development of the various fricatives in Hebrew, Aramaic, Arabic and Maltese through cognate words:

Proto-Semitic	(General) Modern South Arabian	Arabic	Maltese	Aramaic	Hebrew	Examples				
Proto-Semitic	(General) Modern South Arabian	Arabic	Maltese	Aramaic	Hebrew	Arabic	Maltese	Aramaic	Hebrew	meaning
*/ð/ *ḏ	*/ð/	*/ð/ ذ	*/d/ d	*/d/ ד	*/z/ ז	ذهب ذَكَر	deheb –	דהב דכרא	זהב זָכָר	'gold' 'male'
*/z/^{1} *z	*/z/	*/z/ ز	*/z/ ż	*/z/ ז	*/z/ ז	موازين زمن	miżien żmien	מאזנין זמן	מאזנים זמן	'scale' 'time'
*/ɬ/ *ś (s_{2})	*/ɬ/	*/ʃ/ ش	*/ʃ/ x	*/s/ ס	*/s/ ש ,ס	عشر شهر	għaxra xahar	עֲסַר	עשׂר סהר	'ten' 'moon/month'
*/s/ *s (s_{3})	*/s/	*/s/ س	*/s/ s	*/s/ ס	*/s/ ש ,ס	سكين	sikkina	סכין	סכין	'knife'
*/ʃ/ *š (s_{1})	*/ʃ/	*/s/ س	*/s/ s	*/ʃ/ שׁ	*/ʃ/ שׁ	سنة سلام	sena sliem	שׁנה שלם	שׁנה שלום	'year' 'peace'
*/θ/ *ṯ	*/θ/	*/θ/ ث	*/t/ t	*/t/ ת	*/ʃ/ שׁ	ثلاثة اثنان	tlieta tnejn	תלת תרין	שלוש שתים	'three' 'two'
*/θʼ/^{1} *ṱ	*/θʼ ~ ðʼ/	*/ðˤ/ ظ	*/d/ d	*/tʼ/ ט	*/sˤ~ts/^{1} צ	ظل ظهر	dell –	טלה טהרא	צל צהרים	'shadow' 'noon'
*/ɬʼ/^{1} *ṣ́	*/ɬʼ/	*/dˤ/ ض	*/t/ t */d/ d	*/ʕ/ ע	*/sˤ~ts/^{1} צ	أرض ضحك	art daħaq	ארע עחק	ארץ צחק	'land' 'laughed'
*/sʼ/^{1} *ṣ	*/sʼ/	*/sˤ/ ص	*/s/ s	*/sʼ/ צ	*/sˤ~ts/^{1} צ	صرخ صبر		צרח צבר	צרח צבר	'shout' 'watermelon-like plant'
*/χ/ *ḫ	*/χ/	*/x~χ/ خ	*/ħ/ ħ	*/ħ/ ח	*/ħ~χ/ ח	خمسة صرخ	ħamsa –	חַמְשָׁה צרח	חֲמִשָּׁה צרח	'five' 'shout'
*/ħ/ *ḥ	*/ħ/	*/ħ/ ح	*/ħ/ ħ	*/ħ/ ח	*/ħ~χ/ ח	ملح حلم	melħ ħolm	מלח חלם	מלח חלום	'salt' 'dream'
*/ʁ/ *ġ	*/ʁ/	*/ɣ~ʁ/ غ	*/ˤː/ għ	*/ʕ/ ע	*/ʕ~ʔ/ ע	غراب غرب	għorab għarb	ערב מערב	עורב מערב	'raven' 'west'
*/ʕ/ *ʻ	*/ʕ/	*/ʕ/ ع	*/ˤː/ għ	*/ʕ/ ע	*/ʕ~ʔ/ ע	عبد سبعة	għabid sebgħa	עבד שבע	עבד שבע	'slave' 'seven'

1. possibly affricated (/dz/ /tɬʼ/ /ʦʼ/ /tθʼ/ /tɬ/)

=== Vowels ===
Proto-Semitic vowels are, in general, harder to deduce due to the nonconcatenative morphology of Semitic languages. The history of vowel changes in the languages makes drawing up a complete table of correspondences impossible, so only the most common reflexes can be given:

Vowel correspondences in Semitic languages (in Proto-Semitic stressed syllables)
pS	Arabic		Aramaic		Hebrew			Geʽez	Akkadian
pS	Classical	Modern	usually^{4}	/_C.ˈV	/ˈ_.^{1}	/ˈ_Cː^{2}	/ˈ_C.C^{3}	Geʽez	Akkadian
*a	a	a	a	ə	ā	a	ɛ	a, later ä	a, e, ē^{5}
*i	i	i	e, i, WSyr. ɛ	ə	ē	e	ɛ, e	ə	i
*u	u	u	u, o	ə	ō	o	o	ə, ʷə^{6}	u
*ā	ā	ā	ā		ō (Note: see Canaanite shift)			ā, later a	ā, ē
*ī	ī	ī	ī		ī			i	ī
*ū	ū	ū	ū		ū	ū		u	ū
*ay	ay	ē, ay	BA, JA ay(i), ē, WSyr. ay/ī & ay/ē		ayi, ay			e	ī
*aw	aw	ō, aw	ō, WSyr. aw/ū		ō, pausal ˈāwɛ			o	ū

1. in a stressed open syllable
2. in a stressed closed syllable before a geminate
3. in a stressed closed syllable before a consonant cluster
4. when the Proto-Semitic stressed vowel remained stressed
5. pS *a,*ā > Akk. e,ē in the neighborhood of pS *ʕ,*ħ and before r
6. i.e. pS *g,*k,*ḳ,*χ > Geʽez gʷ, kʷ,ḳʷ,χʷ / _u

== Grammar ==
The Semitic languages share a number of grammatical features, although variation – both between separate languages, and within the languages themselves – has naturally occurred over time.

=== Word order ===
The reconstructed default word order in Proto-Semitic is verb–subject–object (VSO), possessed–possessor (NG), and noun–adjective (NA). This was still the case in Classical Arabic and Biblical Hebrew, e.g. Classical Arabic رأى محمد فريدا ra'ā muħammadun farīdan. (literally "saw Muhammad Farid", Muhammad saw Farid). In the modern Arabic vernaculars, however, as well as sometimes in Modern Standard Arabic (the modern literary language based on Classical Arabic) and Modern Hebrew, the classical VSO order has given way to SVO. Modern Ethiopian Semitic languages follow a different word order: SOV, possessor–possessed, and adjective–noun; however, the oldest attested Ethiopian Semitic language, Geʽez, was VSO, possessed–possessor, and noun–adjective. Akkadian was also predominantly SOV.

=== Cases in nouns and adjectives ===
The Proto-Semitic three-case system (nominative, accusative and genitive) with differing vowel endings (-u, -a -i), fully preserved in Qur'anic Arabic (see ʾIʿrab), Akkadian and Ugaritic, has disappeared everywhere in the many colloquial forms of Semitic languages. Modern Standard Arabic maintains such case distinctions, although they are typically lost in free speech due to colloquial influence. An accusative ending -n is preserved in Ethiopian Semitic. (Note: "In the historically attested Semitic languages, the endings of the singular noun-flexions survive, as is well known, only partially: in Akkadian and Arabic and Ugaritic and, limited to the accusative, in Ethiopic.") In the northwest, the scarcely attested Samalian reflects a case distinction in the plural between nominative -ū and oblique -ī (compare the same distinction in Classical Arabic). Additionally, Semitic nouns and adjectives had a category of state, the indefinite state being expressed by nunation.

=== Number in nouns ===
Semitic languages originally had three grammatical numbers: singular, dual, and plural. Classical Arabic still has a mandatory dual (i.e. it must be used in all circumstances when referring to two entities), marked on nouns, verbs, adjectives and pronouns. Many contemporary dialects of Arabic still have a dual, as in the name for the nation of Bahrain (baħr "sea" + -ayn "two"), although it is marked only on nouns. It also occurs in Hebrew in a few nouns (šana means "one year", šnatayim means "two years", and šanim means "years"), but for those it is obligatory. The curious phenomenon of broken plurals – e.g. in Arabic, sadd "one dam" vs. sudūd "dams" – found most profusely in the languages of Arabia and Ethiopia, may be partly of Proto-Semitic origin, and partly elaborated from simpler origins.

=== Verb aspect and tense ===
Paradigm of a regular Classical Arabic verb: Form I kataba (yaktubu) "to write"
		Past		Present Indicative	
Singular
1st		katab-tu	كَتَبْتُ	ʼa-ktub-u	أَكْتُبُ
2nd	masculine	katab-ta	كَتَبْتَ	ta-ktub-u	تَكْتُبُ
2nd	feminine	katab-ti	كَتَبْتِ	ta-ktub-īna	تَكْتُبِينَ
3rd	masculine	katab-a	كَتَبَ	ya-ktub-u	يَكْتُبُ
3rd	feminine	katab-at	كَتَبَتْ	ta-ktub-u	تَكْتُبُ
Dual
2nd	masculine & feminine	katab-tumā	كَتَبْتُمَا	ta-ktub-āni	تَكْتُبَانِ
3rd	masculine	katab-ā	كَتَبَا	ya-ktub-āni	يَكْتُبَانِ
3rd	feminine	katab-atā	كَتَبَتَا	ta-ktub-āni	تَكْتُبَانِ
Plural
1st		katab-nā	كَتَبْنَا	na-ktub-u	نَكْتُبُ
2nd	masculine	katab-tum	كَتَبْتُمْ	ta-ktub-ūna	تَكْتُبُونَ
2nd	feminine	katab-tunna	كَتَبْتُنَّ	ta-ktub-na	تَكْتُبْنَ
3rd	masculine	katab-ū	كَتَبُوا	ya-ktub-ūna	يَكْتُبُونَ
3rd	feminine	katab-na	كَتَبْنَ	ya-ktub-na	يَكْتُبْنَ

All Semitic languages show two quite distinct styles of morphology used for conjugating verbs. Suffix conjugations take suffixes indicating the person, number and gender of the subject, which bear some resemblance to the pronominal suffixes used to indicate direct objects on verbs ("I saw him") and possession on nouns ("his dog"). So-called prefix conjugations actually takes both prefixes and suffixes, with the prefixes primarily indicating person (and sometimes number or gender), while the suffixes (which are completely different from those used in the suffix conjugation) indicate number and gender whenever the prefix does not mark this. The prefix conjugation is noted for a particular pattern of ʔ- t- y- n- prefixes where (1) a t- prefix is used in the singular to mark the second person and third-person feminine, while a y- prefix marks the third-person masculine; and (2) identical words are used for second-person masculine and third-person feminine singular. The prefix conjugation is extremely old, with clear analogues in nearly all the families of Afroasiatic languages (i.e. at least 10,000 years old). The table on the right shows examples of the prefix and suffix conjugations in Classical Arabic, which has forms that are close to Proto-Semitic.

In Proto-Semitic, as still largely reflected in East Semitic, prefix conjugations are used both for the past and the non-past, with different vocalizations. Cf. Akkadian niprus "we decided" (preterite), niptaras "we have decided" (perfect), niparras "we decide" (non-past or imperfect), vs. suffix-conjugated parsānu "we are/were/will be deciding" (stative). Some of these features, e.g. gemination indicating the non-past/imperfect, are generally attributed to Afroasiatic. Proto-Semitic had an additional form, the jussive, which was distinguished from the preterite only by the position of stress: the jussive had final stress while the preterite had non-final (retracted) stress.

The West Semitic languages significantly reshaped the system. The most substantial changes occurred in the Central Semitic languages (the ancestors of modern Hebrew, Arabic and Aramaic). Essentially, the old prefix-conjugated jussive or preterite became a new non-past (or imperfect), while the stative became a new past (or perfect), and the old prefix-conjugated non-past (or imperfect) with gemination was discarded. New suffixes were used to mark different moods in the non-past, e.g. Classical Arabic -u (indicative), -a (subjunctive), vs no suffix (jussive). It is not generally agreed whether the systems of the various Semitic languages are better interpreted in terms of tense, i.e. past vs. non-past, or aspect, i.e. perfect vs. imperfect. A special feature in classical Hebrew is the waw-consecutive, prefixing a verb form with the letter waw in order to change its tense or aspect. The South Semitic languages show a system somewhere between the East and Central Semitic languages.

Later languages show further developments. In the modern varieties of Arabic, for example, the old mood suffixes were dropped, and new mood prefixes developed (e.g. bi- for indicative vs. no prefix for subjunctive in many varieties). In the extreme case of Neo-Aramaic, the verb conjugations have been entirely reworked under Iranian influence.

=== Morphology: triliteral roots ===
All Semitic languages exhibit a unique pattern of stems called Semitic roots consisting typically of triliteral, or three-consonant consonantal roots (two- and four-consonant roots also exist), from which nouns, adjectives, and verbs are formed in various ways (e.g., by inserting vowels, doubling consonants, lengthening vowels or by adding prefixes, suffixes, or infixes).

For instance, the root k-t-b (dealing with "writing" generally) yields in Arabic:

katabtu كَتَبْتُ or كتبت "I wrote" (f and m)
yuktab(u) يُكْتَب or يكتب "being written" (masculine)
tuktab(u) تُكتَب or تكتب "being written" (feminine)
yatakātabūn(a) يَتَكَاتَبُونَ or يتكاتبون "they write to each other" (masculine)
istiktāb اِستِكتاب or استكتاب "causing to write"
kitāb كِتَاب or كتاب "book" (the hyphen shows end of stem before various case endings)
kutayyib كُتَيِّب or كتيب "booklet" (diminutive)
kitābat كِتَابَة or كتابة "writing"
kuttāb كُتاب or كتاب "writers" (broken plural)
katabat كَتَبَة or كتبة "clerks" (broken plural)
maktab مَكتَب or مكتب "desk" or "office"
maktabat مَكتَبة or مكتبة "library" or "bookshop"
maktūb مَكتوب or مكتوب "written" (participle) or "postal letter" (noun)
katībat كَتيبة or كتيبة "squadron" or "document"
iktitāb اِكتِتاب or اكتتاب "registration" or "contribution of funds"
muktatib مُكتَتِب or مكتتب "subscription"

and the same root in Hebrew:

kāṯaḇti כתבתי or כָּתַבְתִּי "I wrote"
kattāḇ כתב or כַּתָּב "reporter" (m)
katteḇeṯ כתבת or כַּתָּבֶת "reporter" (f)
kattāḇā כתבה or כַּתָּבָה "article" (plural kattāḇōṯ כתבות)
miḵtāḇ מכתב or מִכְתָּב "postal letter" (plural miḵtāḇīm מכתבים)
miḵtāḇā מכתבה "writing desk" (plural miḵtāḇōṯ מכתבות)
kəṯōḇeṯ כתובת "address" (plural kəṯōḇōṯ כתובות)
kəṯāḇ כתב "handwriting"
kāṯūḇ כתוב "written" (f kəṯūḇā כתובה)
hiḵtīḇ הכתיב "he dictated" (f hiḵtīḇā הכתיבה)
hiṯkattēḇ התכתב "he corresponded (f hiṯkattəḇā התכתבה)
niḵtaḇ נכתב "it was written" (m)
niḵtəḇā נכתבה "it was written" (f)
kəṯīḇ כתיב "spelling" (m)
taḵtīḇ תכתיב "prescript" (m)
m'ə'ḵuttāḇ מכותב "addressee" (meḵutteḇeṯ מכותבת f)
kəṯubbā כתובה "ketubah (a Jewish marriage contract)" (f)

(Underlined consonants ⟨ḵ⟩, ⟨ṯ⟩, ⟨ḇ⟩ represent the fricatives /x/, /θ/, /v/ respectively.)

In Tigrinya and Amharic, this root was used widely but is now seen as an archaic form. Ethiopic-derived languages use different roots for things that have to do with writing (and in some cases counting). The primitive root ṣ-f and the trilateral root stems m-ṣ-f, ṣ-h-f, and ṣ-f-r are used. This root also exists in other Semitic languages, such as Hebrew: sep̄er "book", sōp̄er "scribe", mispār "number", and sippūr "story". This root also exists in Arabic and is used to form words with a close meaning to "writing", such as ṣaḥāfa "journalism", and ṣaḥīfa "newspaper" or "parchment". Verbs in other non-Semitic Afroasiatic languages show similar radical patterns, but more usually with biconsonantal roots; e.g. Kabyle afeg means "fly!", while affug means "flight", and yufeg means "he flew" (compare with Hebrew, where hap̄lēḡ means "set sail!", hap̄lāḡā means "a sailing trip", and hip̄līḡ means "he sailed", while the unrelated ʕūp̄, təʕūp̄ā, and ʕāp̄ pertain to flight).

=== Independent personal pronouns ===
English	Proto-Semitic	Akkadian	Arabic		Geʽez	Hebrew	Aramaic	Suret	Maltese
English	Proto-Semitic	Akkadian	standard	common vernaculars	Geʽez	Hebrew	Aramaic	Suret	Maltese
I	*ʔanāku, (Note: While some believe that *ʔanāku was an innovation in some branches of Semitic utilizing an "intensifying" *-ku, comparison to other Afro-Asiatic 1ps pronouns (e.g. 3nk, Coptic anak, anok, proto-Berber *ənakkʷ) suggests that this goes further back.) *ʔaniya	anāku	أنا ʔanā	ʔanā, anā, ana, āni, āna, ānig	አነ ʔana	אנכי, אני ʔānōḵī, ʔănī	אנא ʔanā	ānā	jiena, jien
You (sg., masc.)	*ʔanka > *ʔanta	atta	أنت ʔanta	ʔant, ant, inta, inte, inti, int, (i)nta	አንተ ʔánta	אתה ʔattā	אנת ʔantā	āt, āty, āten	int, inti
You (sg., fem.)	*ʔanti	atti	أنت ʔanti	ʔanti, anti, inti, init (i)nti, intch	አንቲ ʔánti	את ʔatt	אנת ʔanti	āt, āty, āten	int, inti
He	*suʔa	šū	هو huwa, hū	huwwa, huwwe, hū	ውእቱ wəʔətu	הוא hū	הוא hu	owā	hu, huwa
She	*siʔa	šī	هي hiya, hī	hiyya, hiyye, hī	ይእቲ yəʔəti	היא hī	היא hi	ayā	hi, hija
We	*niyaħnū, *niyaħnā	nīnu	نحن naħnu	niħna, iħna, ħinna	ንሕነ ʔnəħnā	אנו, אנחנו ʔānū, ʔănaħnū	נחנא náħnā	axnan	aħna
You (dual)	*ʔantunā		أنتما ʔantumā	Plural form is used					
They (dual)	*sunā (Note: The Akkadian form is from Sargonic Akkadian. Among the Semitic languages, there are languages with /i/ as the final vowel (this is the form in Mehri). For a recent discussion concerning the reconstruction of the forms of the dual pronouns, see Bar-Asher, Elitzur. 2009. "Dual Pronouns in Semitics and an Evaluation of the Evidence for their Existence in Biblical Hebrew," Ancient Near Eastern Studies 46: 32–49)	*sunī(ti)	هما humā	Plural form is used					
You (pl., masc.)	*ʔantunū	attunu	أنتم ʔantum, ʔantumu	ʔantum, antum, antu, intu, intum, (i)ntūma	አንትሙ ʔantəmu	אתם ʔattem	אנתן ʔantun	axtōxūn	intom
You (pl., fem.)	*ʔantinā	attina	أنتنّ ʔantunna	ʔantin, antin, ʔantum, antu, intu, intum, (i)ntūma	አንትን ʔantən	אתן ʔatten	אנתן ʔanten	axtōxūn	intom
They (masc.)	*sunū	šunu	هم hum, humu	hum, humma, hūma, hom, hinne(n)	እሙንቱ ʔəmuntu	הם, המה hēm, hēmmā	הנן hinnun	eni	huma
They (fem.)	*sinā	šina	هنّ hunna	hin, hinne(n), hum, humma, hūma	እማንቱ ʔəmāntu	הן, הנה hēn, hēnnā	הנן hinnin	eni	huma

=== Cardinal numerals ===
English	Proto-Semitic	IPA	Arabic	Hebrew	Sabaic	Assyrian Neo-Aramaic	Maltese	Geʽez
One	*ʼaḥad-, *ʻišt-	ʔaħad, ʔiʃt	واحد، أحد waːħid-, ʔaħad-	אחד ʼeḥáḏ, ʔeˈχad	ʔḥd	xā	wieħed	አሐዱ ʾäḥädu
Two	*ṯin-ān (nom.), *ṯin-ayn (obl.), *kilʼ-	θinaːn, θinajn, kilʔ	اثنان iθn-āni (nom.), اثنين iθn-ajni (obj.), اثنتان fem. iθnat-āni, اثنتين iθnat-ajni	שנים šənáyim ˈʃn-ajim, fem. שתים šətáyim ˈʃt-ajim	*ṯny	treh	tnejn	ክልኤቱ kəlʾetu
Three	*śalāṯ- > *ṯalāṯ- (Note: This root underwent regressive assimilation. This parallels the non-adjacent assimilation of *ś... > *š...š in proto-Canaanite or proto-North-West-Semitic in the roots *śam?š > *šamš 'sun' and *śur?š > *šurš 'root'. The form *ṯalāṯ- appears in most languages (e.g. Aramaic, Arabic, Ugaritic), but the original form ślṯ appears in the Old South Arabian languages, and a form with s < *ś (rather than š < *ṯ) appears in Akkadian.)	ɬalaːθ > θalaːθ	ثلاث θalaːθ-	fem. שלוש šālṓš ʃaˈloʃ	*ślṯ	ṭlā	tlieta	ሠለስቱ śälästu
Four	*ʼarbaʻ-	ʔarbaʕ	أربع ʔarbaʕ-	fem. ארבע ʼárbaʻ ˈʔaʁba	*ʼrbʻ	arpā	erbgħa	አርባዕቱ ʾärbaʿtu
Five	*ḫamš-	χamʃ	خمس χams-	fem. חמש ḥā́mēš ˈχameʃ	*ḫmš	xamšā	ħamsa	ኀምስቱ ḫämsətu
Six	*šidṯ- (Note: This root was also assimilated in various ways. For example, Hebrew reflects *šišš-, with total assimilation; Arabic reflects *šitt- in cardinal numerals, but less assimilated *šādiš- in ordinal numerals. Epigraphic South Arabian reflects original *šdṯ; Ugaritic has a form ṯṯ, in which the ṯ has been assimilated throughout the root.)	ʃidθ	ستّ sitt- (ordinal سادس saːdis-)	fem. שש šēš ʃeʃ	*šdṯ/šṯ	ëštā	sitta	ስድስቱ sədsətu
Seven	*šabʻ-	ʃabʕ	سبع sabʕ-	fem. שבע šéḇaʻ ˈʃeva	*šbʻ	šowā	sebgħa	ሰብዐቱ säbʿätu
Eight	*ṯamāniy-	θamaːnij-	ثماني θamaːn-ij-	fem. שמונה šəmṓneh ʃˈmone	*ṯmny/ṯmn	*tmanyā	tmienja	ሰማንቱ sämantu
Nine	*tišʻ-	tiʃʕ	تسع tisʕ-	fem. תשע tḗšaʻ ˈtejʃa	*tšʻ	*učā	disgħa	ተስዐቱ täsʿätu
Ten	*ʻaśr-	ʕaɬr	عشر ʕaʃ(a)r-	fem. עשר ʻéśer ˈʔeseʁ	*ʻśr	*uṣrā	għaxra	ዐሠርቱ ʿäśärtu

These are the basic numeral stems without feminine suffixes. In most older Semitic languages, the forms of the numerals from 3 to 10 exhibit polarity of gender (also called "chiastic concord" or "reverse agreement"), i.e. if the counted noun is masculine, the numeral would be feminine and vice versa.

=== Typology ===
Some early Semitic languages are speculated to have had weak ergative features.

== Common vocabulary ==
Due to the Semitic languages' common origin, they share some words and roots. Others differ. For example:

English	Proto-Semitic	Akkadian	Arabic	Aramaic	Suret	Hebrew	Geʽez	Mehri	Maltese
father	*ʼab-	ab-	ʼab-	ʼaḇ-āʼ	bābā	ʼāḇ	ʼab	ḥa-yb	bu (missier)
mother	*ʼimm-	ʼimm-	umm-	ʼumm-	māmā	ʼēm	ʼimm-	ʼəmm-	omm (omm)
brother	*ʼaḫ-	ʼaḫ-	aḫ-	ʼaḫ-	ʼaḫ-	ʼāḥ	ʼaḥ	ʼəḫ-	ħu (ħu)
sister	*ʼaḫāt-	ʼaḫāt-	aḫāt-	ʼuḫt-	ʼuḫt-	ʼāḥôṯ	ʼaḥtā	ʼəḫt-	oħt (oħt)
heart	*lib(a)b-	libb-	lubb- (qalb-)	lebb-āʼ	lëbā	lëḇ, lëḇāḇ	ləbb	ḥa-wbēb	ilbieba (qalb)
house	*bayt-	bītu, bētu	bayt- (dār-)	bayt-āʼ	bētā	báyiṯ	bet	beyt, bêt	bejt (dar)
peace	*šalām-	šalām-	salām-	šlām-āʼ	šlāmā	šālôm	salām	səlōm	sliem
tongue	*lišān-/*lašān-	lišān-	lisān-	leššān-āʼ	lišānā	lāšôn	ləssān	əwšēn	ilsien
water	*may-/*māy-	mû (root *mā-/*māy-)	māʼ-/māy	mayy-āʼ	mēyā	máyim	māy	ḥə-mō	ilma

Terms given in brackets are not derived from the respective Proto-Semitic roots, though they may also derive from Proto-Semitic (as does e.g. Arabic dār, cf. Biblical Hebrew dōr "dwelling").

Sometimes, certain roots differ in meaning from one Semitic language to another. For example, the root b-y-ḍ in Arabic has the meaning of "white" as well as "egg", whereas in Hebrew it only means "egg". The root l-b-n means "milk" in Arabic, but the color "white" in Hebrew. The root l-ḥ-m means "meat" in Arabic, but "bread" in Hebrew and "cow" in Ethiopian Semitic; the original meaning was most probably "food". The word medina (root: d-y-n/d-w-n) has the meaning of "metropolis" in Amharic, "city" in Arabic and Ancient Hebrew, and "State" in Modern Hebrew.

There is sometimes no relation between the roots. For example, "knowledge" is represented in Hebrew by the root y-d-ʿ, but in Arabic by the roots ʿ-r-f and ʿ-l-m and in Ethiosemitic by the roots ʿ-w-q and f-l-ṭ.

For more comparative vocabulary lists, see the Wiktionary appendix List of Proto-Semitic stems.

== Classification ==
Distribution of the Semitic languages among related Afro-Asiatic languages

There are six fairly uncontroversial nodes within the Semitic languages: East Semitic, Northwest Semitic, North Arabian, Old South Arabian (also known as Sayhadic), Modern South Arabian, and Ethiopian Semitic. These are generally grouped further, but there is ongoing debate as to which belong together. The classification based on shared innovations given below, established by Robert Hetzron in 1976 and with later emendations by John Huehnergard and Rodgers as summarized in Hetzron 1997, is the most widely accepted today. In particular, several Semiticists still argue for the traditional (partially nonlinguistic) view of Arabic as part of South Semitic, and a few (e.g. Alexander Militarev or the German-Egyptian professor Arafa Hussein Mustafa) see Modern South Arabian as a third branch of Semitic alongside East and West Semitic, rather than as a subgroup of South Semitic. However, a new classification groups Old South Arabian as Central Semitic instead.

Roger Blench notes that the Gurage languages are highly divergent and wonders whether they might not be a primary branch, reflecting an origin of Afroasiatic in or near Ethiopia. At a lower level, there is still no general agreement on where to draw the line between "languages" and "dialects" – an issue particularly relevant in Arabic, Aramaic and Gurage – and the strong mutual influences between Arabic dialects render a genetic subclassification of them particularly difficult.

A computational phylogenetic analysis by Kitchen et al. (2009) considers the Semitic languages to have originated in the Levant c. 3750 BCE during the Early Bronze Age, with early Ethiosemitic originating from southern Arabia c. 800 BCE. Evidence for gene movements consistent with this were found in Almarri et al. (2021).

The Himyaritic and Sutean languages appear to have been Semitic, but are unclassified due to insufficient data.

Summary classification

- East Semitic
- West Semitic
  - Central Semitic
    - Northwest Semitic
    - Arabic
  - South Semitic
    - Western: Ethiopian Semitic and Old South Arabian
    - Eastern: Modern South Arabian

=== Detailed list ===
- Semitic
  - East Semitic (All extinct)
    - Akkadian
      - Old Akkadian
      - Babylonian
      - Assyrian
      - Canaano-Akkadian
    - Eblaite
    - Kishite
    - Dilmunite ?
  - West Semitic
    - Central Semitic
      - Northwest Semitic
        - Aramaic
          - Old Aramaic
            - Samalian (extinct)
            - Imperial Aramaic (extinct)
              - Biblical Aramaic (extinct)
            - Middle Aramaic
              - Eastern Aramaic (dialect continuum)
                - Eastern Middle Aramaic
                  - Classical Syriac
                  - Hatran Aramaic (extinct)
                  - Central Neo-Aramaic
                    - Turoyo (Surayt)
                    - Mlaḥsô (extinct)
                  - Northeastern Neo-Aramaic (dialect continuum)
                    - Sureth
                      - Assyrian Neo-Aramaic
                        - Christian Urmi Neo-Aramaic
                        - Bohtan Neo-Aramaic
                        - Senaya Neo-Aramaic
                      - Chaldean Neo-Aramaic
                    - Koy Sanjaq Christian Neo-Aramaic
                    - Hertevin Neo-Aramaic
                    - Qaraqosh Neo-Aramaic
                    - Jewish Assyrian Neo-Aramaic
                      - Lishanid Noshan
                      - Barzani Jewish Neo-Aramaic
                      - Hulaulá
                      - Lishana Deni
                      - Lishán Didán
                      - Betanure Jewish Neo-Aramaic
                      - Koy Sanjaq Jewish Neo-Aramaic
                  - Southeastern Aramaic
                    - Mandaic
                      - Neo-Mandaic
                    - Jewish Babylonian Aramaic (extinct)
              - Western Aramaic (dialect continuum)
                - Western Middle Aramaic
                  - Nabataean Aramaic (extinct)
                  - Palmyrene Aramaic (extinct)
                  - Western Neo-Aramaic
                  - Palestinian Aramaic (All extinct)
                    - Samaritan Aramaic
                    - Jewish Palestinian Aramaic
                      - Galilean dialect
                    - Christian Palestinian Aramaic
                  - Lebanese Aramaic (extinct)
              - Armazic (extinct)
        - Canaanite
          - North Canaanite
            - Phoenician (extinct)
              - Punic (extinct)
          - South Canaanite
            - Ammonite (extinct)
            - Moabite (extinct)
            - Edomite (extinct)
            - Biblical Hebrew
              - Mishnaic Hebrew
                - Medieval Hebrew
                  - Hebrew (Modern Hebrew) (revived)
              - Samaritan Hebrew (extinct (apart from modern liturgical uses))
        - Ugaritic (extinct)
        - Amorite (extinct)
        - Taymanitic ? (extinct)
      - North Arabian
        - Old Arabic
          - Pre-classical Arabic
            - Arabic
              - Classical Arabic
                - Modern Standard Arabic
              - Mashriqi Arabic (Eastern Arabic) (dialect continuum)
                - Peninsular Arabic (dialect continuum)
                  - Old Hijazi Arabic
                    - Hejazi Arabic
                  - Gulf Arabic
                    - Emirati Arabic
                    - Bahraini Gulf Arabic
                    - Kuwaiti Arabic
                    - Qatari Arabic
                  - Bahrani Arabic
                  - Omani Arabic
                  - Shihhi Arabic
                  - Dhofari Arabic
                  - Yemeni Arabic (dialect continuum)
                    - Hadhrami Arabic
                      - Indonesian Arabic
                    - Sanʽani Arabic
                    - Taʽizzi-Adeni Arabic
                      - Taʽizzi Arabic
                      - Adeni Arabic
                      - Djibouti Arabic
                    - Judeo-Yemeni Arabic
                    - Tihamiyya Arabic
                      - Zabidi dialect
                    - Yafi'i Arabic
                  - Northwest Arabian Arabic (Levantine Bedawi Arabic, Eastern Egyptian Bedawi Arabic)
                  - Najdi Arabic
                  - Bareqi Arabic
                - Egypto-Sudanic Arabic (dialect continuum)
                  - Egyptian Arabic (dialect continuum)
                    - Judeo-Egyptian Arabic
                    - Saʽidi Arabic
                    - Cairene Arabic
                  - Sudanese-Chadian Arabic (dialect continuum)
                    - Sudanese Arabic
                    - Chadian Arabic
                - Levantine Arabic (dialect continuum)
                  - North Levantine Arabic
                    - Cilician Arabic
                    - Aleppine Arabic
                    - Damascene Arabic
                    - Judeo-Syrian Arabic
                    - Lebanese Arabic
                  - South Levantine Arabic
                    - Palestinian Arabic
                      - Modern Palestinian Judeo-Arabic
                    - Jordanian Arabic
                - Mesopotamian Arabic/Iraqi Arabic (dialect continuum)
                  - Gilit Dialects (dialect continuum)
                    - Baghdadi Arabic
                    - Shawi Arabic
                    - Khuzestani Arabic
                    - South Mesopotamian Arabic
                  - Qeltu Dialects (dialect continuum)
                    - North Mesopotamian Arabic
                    - Anatolian Arabic
                    - Judeo-Iraqi Arabic
                      - Jewish Baghdadi Arabic
                    - Cypriot Arabic
                - Central Asian Arabic (dialect continuum)
                  - Bakhtiari Arabic
                  - Bukharian Arabic
                  - Kashkadarian Arabic
                  - Khorasani Arabic
                - Shirvani Arabic (extinct)
              - Maghrebi Arabic (Western Arabic) (dialect continuum)
                - Pre-Hilalian dialects
                  - Pre-Hilalian Urban Arabic dialects
                    - Fessi dialect
                  - Jebli Arabic
                  - Jijel Arabic
                  - Maghrebi Judeo-Arabic
                    - Judeo-Moroccan Arabic
                    - Judeo-Tripolitanian Arabic
                    - Judeo-Tunisian Arabic
                    - Judeo-Algerian Arabic
                  - Siculo-Arabic
                    - Maltese
                      - Cottonera Dialect
                      - Gozitan dialects
                      - Qormi dialect
                      - Żejtun dialect
                      - Maltralian
                      - Corfiot Maltese (extinct)
                  - Andalusi Arabic (extinct)
                  - Eastern pre-Hilali Dialects
                    - Tunisian Arabic
                  - Western pre-Hilali dialects
                - Hilalian dialects
                  - Sulaym dialects
                    - Libyan Arabic
                      - Western Egyptian Bedawi Arabic
                  - Eastern Hilali dialects
                  - Central Hilali dialects
                    - Algerian Saharan Arabic
                  - Western Hilali dialects
                  - Maqil dialects
                    - Hassaniya Arabic
                - Koines
                  - Algerian Arabic
                  - Moroccan Arabic
            - ˀAzd dialect (extinct)
            - Huḏayl dialect (extinct)
            - Ṭayyiˀ dialect (extinct)
          - Safaitic (extinct)
          - Hismaic (extinct)
          - Hasaitic (extinct)
          - Nabataean Arabic (extinct)
        - Dadanitic ? (extinct)
        - Thamudic ? (extinct)
    - South Semitic
      - Western South Semitic
        - Ethiopic
          - North Ethiopic
            - Geʽez (Classical Ethiopic)
              - Dahalik
              - Tigre
            - Tigrinya
          - South Ethiopic
            - Transversal South Ethiopic
              - Amharic–Argobba
                - Amharic
                - Argobba
              - Harari–East Gurage
                - Harari
                - East Gurage
                  - Silt'e
                  - Zway
            - Outer South Ethiopic
              - n-group
                - Gafat (extinct)
                - Soddo
              - tt-group
                - Mesmes (extinct)
                - Muher
                - West Gurage
                  - Mesqan
                  - Sebat Bet
                    - Sebat Bet Gurage
                    - Inor
        - Old South Arabian (Ṣayhadic)
          - Sabaic (extinct)
          - Minaean (extinct)
          - Qatabanian (extinct)
            - Awsānian (extinct)
          - Hadramautic (extinct)
          - Razihi ?
          - Faifi ?
          - Himyaritic ? (extinct)
      - Modern South Arabian (Eastern South Semitic)
        - Baṭḥari
        - Ḥarsusi
        - Hobyót
        - Mehri
        - Shehri
        - Soqotri
  - Unclassified
    - Sutean (extinct)

== See also ==
- Proto-Semitic language
- Middle Bronze Age alphabets
- Semitic studies

== Bibliography ==
- Afsaruddin, Asma; Zahniser, A. H. Mathias (1997). Humanism, Culture, and Language in the Near East: Studies in Honor of Georg Krotkoff. Winona Lake, Ind.: Penn State University Press. doi:10.5325/j.ctv1w36pkt. ISBN 978-1-57506-020-0. JSTOR 10.5325/j.ctv1w36pkt. Archived from the original on 27 March 2022.
- Austin, Peter K., ed. (2008). One Thousand Languages: Living, Endangered, and Lost. Berkeley: University of California Press. ISBN 978-0-520-25560-9. Archived from the original on 26 May 2024.
- Baasten, Martin F. J. (2003). "A Note on the History of 'Semitic'". In Baasten, M. F. J.; Van Peursen, W. Th. (eds.). Hamlet on a Hill: Semitic and Greek Studies Presented to Professor T. Muraoka on the Occasion of His Sixty-fifth Birthday. Peeters. pp. 57–73. ISBN 90-429-1215-4.
- Bennett, Patrick R. (1998). Comparative Semitic Linguistics: A Manual. Winona Lake, Indiana: Eisenbrauns. ISBN 1-57506-021-3.
- Blau, Joshua (2010). Phonology and Morphology of Biblical Hebrew. Winona Lake, Indiana: Eisenbrauns. ISBN 978-1-57506-129-0.
- Coghill, Eleanor (2016). The Rise and Fall of Ergativity in Aramaic: Cycles of Alignment Change. Oxford: Oxford University Press. ISBN 978-0-19-872380-6.
- Davies, John (1854). "On the Semitic Languages, and their relations with the Indo-European Class. Pt I. On the Nature and Development of Semitic Roots". Transactions of the Philological Society (10). Archived from the original on 25 February 2022.
- Davies, John (1854). "On the Semitic Languages, and their relations with the Indo-European Class. Pt II. On the Connection of Semitic Roots with corresponding forms in the Indo-European Class of Languages". Transactions of the Philological Society (13). Archived from the original on 25 February 2022.
- Dekel, Nurit (2014). Colloquial Israeli Hebrew: A Corpus-based Survey. De Gruyter. ISBN 978-3-11-037725-5.
- Dolgopolsky, Aron (1999). From Proto-Semitic to Hebrew. Milan: Centro Studi Camito-Semitici di Milano.
- Eichhorn, Johann Gottfried (1794). Allgemeine Bibliothek der biblischen Literatur [General Library of Biblical Literature] (in German). Vol. 6. Archived from the original on 26 May 2024.
- Brock, Sebastian (1998). "Syriac Culture, 337–425". In Cameron, Averil; Garnsey, Peter (eds.). The Cambridge Ancient History. Vol. 13: The Late Empire, A.D. 337–425. Cambridge: Cambridge University Press. pp. 708–719. ISBN 0-521-85073-8. Archived from the original on 26 May 2024.
- Greenberg, Joseph H. (1999). "The Diachronic Typological Approach to Language". In Shibatani, Masayoshi; Bynon, Theodora (eds.). Approaches to Language Typology. Oxford: Oxford University Press. pp. 145–166. ISBN 0-19-823866-5. Archived from the original on 26 May 2024.
- Bergsträsser, Gotthelf (1995). Introduction to the Semitic Languages: Text Specimens and Grammatical Sketches. Translated by Daniels, Peter T. Winona Lake, Indiana: Eisenbrauns. ISBN 0-931464-10-2.
- Garbini, Giovanni (1984). Le lingue semitiche: studi di storia linguistica [Semitic languages: studies of linguistic history] (in Italian). Naples: Istituto Orientale.
- Garbini, Giovanni; Durand, Olivier (1994). Introduzione alle lingue semitiche [Introduction to Semitic languages] (in Italian). Brescia: Paideia.
- Goldenberg, Gideon (2013). Semitic Languages: Features, Structures, Relations, Processes. Oxford University Press. ISBN 978-0-19-964491-9.
- Hackett, Jo Ann (2006). "Semitic Languages". In Keith Brown; Sarah Ogilvie (eds.). Concise Encyclopedia of Languages of the World. Elsevier. pp. 929–935. ISBN 9780080877754. Archived from the original on 26 May 2024.
- Harrak, Amir (1992). "The ancient name of Edessa". Journal of Near Eastern Studies. 51 (3): 209–214. doi:10.1086/373553. JSTOR 545546. S2CID 162190342.
- Hetzron, Robert (1997). The Semitic Languages. Routledge. ISBN 978-0-415-05767-7.
- Hetzron, Robert; Kaye, Alan S.; Zuckermann, Ghil'ad (2018). "Semitic Languages". In Comrie, Bernard (ed.). The World's Major Languages (3rd ed.). London: Routledge. pp. 568–576. doi:10.4324/9781315644936. ISBN 978-1-315-64493-6. Archived from the original on 19 December 2021.
- Hudson, Grover; Kogan, Leonid E. (1997). "Amharic and Argobba". In Hetzron, Robert (ed.). The Semitic Languages. New York: Routledge. pp. 457–485. ISBN 0-415-05767-1. Archived from the original on 26 May 2024.
- Izre'el, Shlomo (1987c), Canaano-Akkadian (PDF), archived (PDF) from the original on 21 October 2020
- Kiraz, George Anton (2001). Computational Nonlinear Morphology: With Emphasis on Semitic Languages. Cambridge University Press. p. 25. ISBN 9780521631969. "The term "Semitic" is borrowed from the Bible (Gene. x.21 and xi.10–26). It was first used by the Orientalist A. L. Schlözer in 1781 to designate the languages spoken by the Aramæans, Hebrews, Arabs, and other peoples of the Near East (Moscati et al., 1969, Sect. 1.2). Before Schlözer, these languages and dialects were known as Oriental languages."
- Kitchen, A.; Ehret, C.; Assefa, S. (2009). "Bayesian phylogenetic analysis of Semitic languages identifies an Early Bronze Age origin of Semitic in the Near East". Proceedings. Biological Sciences. 276 (1668): 2703–10. doi:10.1098/rspb.2009.0408. PMC 2839953. PMID 19403539.
- Kitto, John (1845). A Cyclopædia of Biblical Literature. London: W. Clowes and Sons. "That important family of languages, of which the Arabic is the most cultivated and most widely-extended branch, has long wanted an appropriate common name. The term Oriental languages, which was exclusively applied to it from the time of Jerome down to the end of the last century, and which is even now not entirely abandoned, must always have been an unscientific one, inasmuch as the countries in which these languages prevailed are only the east in respect to Europe; and when Sanskrit, Chinese, and other idioms of the remoter East were brought within the reach of our research, it became palpably incorrect. Under a sense of this impropriety, Eichhorn was the first, as he says himself (Allg. Bibl. Biblioth. vi. 772), to introduce the name Semitic languages, which was soon generally adopted, and which is the most usual one at the present day. [...] In modern times, however, the very appropriate designation Syro-Arabian languages has been proposed by Dr. Prichard, in his Physical History of Man. This term, [...] has the advantage of forming an exact counterpart to the name by which the only other great family of languages with which we are likely to bring the Syro-Arabian into relations of contrast or accordance, is now universally known—the Indo-Germanic. Like it, by taking up only the two extreme members of a whole sisterhood according to their geographical position when in their native seats, it embraces all the intermediate branches under a common band; and, like it, it constitutes a name which is not only at once intelligible, but one which in itself conveys a notion of that affinity between the sister dialects, which it is one of the objects of comparative philology to demonstrate and to apply."
- Kogan, Leonid (2012). "Proto-Semitic Phonology and Phonetics". In Weninger, Stefan (ed.). The Semitic Languages: An International Handbook. Walter de Gruyter. ISBN 978-3-11-025158-6.
- Kuntz, Marion Leathers (1981). Guillaume Postel: Prophet of the Restitution of All Things His Life and Thought. The Hague: Nijhoff. ISBN 90-247-2523-2. Archived from the original on 26 May 2024.
- Kogan, Leonid (2011). "Proto-Semitic Phonology and Phonetics". In Weninger, Stefan (ed.). The Semitic Languages: An International Handbook. Walter de Gruyter. ISBN 978-3-11-025158-6. Archived from the original on 18 October 2023.
- Levine, Donald N. (2000). Greater Ethiopia: The Evolution of a Multiethnic Society (2. ed.). University of Chicago Press. ISBN 978-0-226-22967-6. Archived from the original on 26 May 2024.
- Lipiński, Edward (2001). Semitic Languages: Outline of a Comparative Grammar (2nd ed.). Leuven: Peeters. ISBN 90-429-0815-7.
- Mustafa, Arafa Hussein. 1974. Analytical study of phrases and sentences in epic texts of Ugarit. (German title: Untersuchungen zu Satztypen in den epischen Texten von Ugarit). Dissertation. Halle-Wittenberg: Martin-Luther-University.
- Moscati, Sabatino (1969). An Introduction to the Comparative Grammar of the Semitic Languages: Phonology and Morphology. Wiesbaden: Harrassowitz.
- Moscati, Sabatino (1958). "On Semitic Case-Endings". Journal of Near Eastern Studies. 17 (2): 142–144. doi:10.1086/371454. S2CID 161828505.
- Müller, Hans-Peter (1995). "Ergative Constructions in Early Semitic Languages". Journal of Near Eastern Studies. 54 (4): 261–271. doi:10.1086/373769. JSTOR 545846. S2CID 161626451.
- Nebes, Norbert (2005). "Epigraphic South Arabian". In Uhlig, Siegbert (ed.). Encyclopaedia Aethiopica. Wiesbaden: Harrassowitz. ISBN 978-3-447-05238-2.
- Ullendorff, Edward (1955). The Semitic Languages of Ethiopia: A Comparative Phonology. London: Taylor's (Foreign) Press.
- Owens, Jonathan (2013). The Oxford Handbook of Arabic Linguistics. Oxford University Press. ISBN 978-0199344093. Archived from the original on 26 May 2024.
- Phillipson, David (2012). Foundations of an African Civilization, Aksum and the Northern Horn 1000 BC-AD 1300. Boydell & Brewer. ISBN 9781846158735. Archived from the original on 26 May 2024. "The former belief that this arrival of South-Semitic-speakers took place in about the second quarter of the first millennium BC can no longer be accepted in view of linguistic indications that these languages were spoken in the northern Horn at a much earlier date."
- Ruhlen, Merritt (1991). A Guide to the World's Languages: Classification. Stanford, California: Stanford University Press. ISBN 0-8047-1894-6. Archived from the original on 26 May 2024. "The other linguistic group to be recognized in the eighteenth century was the Semitic family. The German scholar Ludwig von Schlozer is often credited with having recognized, and named, the Semitic family in 1781. But the affinity of Hebrew, Arabic, and Aramaic had been recognized for centuries by Jewish, Christian and Islamic scholars, and this knowledge was published in Western Europe as early as 1538 (see Postel 1538). Around 1700 Hiob Ludolf, who had written grammars of Geez and Amharic (both Ethiopic Semitic languages) in the seventeenth century, recognized the extension of the Semitic family into East Africa. Thus when von Schlozer named the family in 1781 he was merely recognizing genetic relationships that had been known for centuries. Three Semitic languages (Aramaic, Arabic, and Hebrew) were long familiar to Europeans both because of their geographic proximity and because the Bible was written in Hebrew and Aramaic."
- Sánchez, Francisco del Río (2013). Monferrer-Sala, Juan Pedro; Watson, Wilfred G. E. (eds.). Archaism and Innovation in the Semitic Languages. Selected Papers. Córdoba: Oriens Academic. ISBN 978-84-695-7829-2. Archived from the original on 11 September 2021.
- Smart, J. R. (2013). Tradition and modernity in Arabic language and literature. Smart, J. R., Shaban Memorial Conference (2nd : 1994 : University of Exeter). Richmond, Surrey, U.K.: Taylor & Francis. ISBN 978-1-13678-812-3.
- Versteegh, Kees (1997). The Arabic Language. New York: Columbia University Press. ISBN 978-0-231-11152-2. Archived from the original on 26 May 2024.
- Waltke, Bruce K.; O'Connor, Michael Patrick (1990). An Introduction to Biblical Hebrew Syntax. Vol. 3. Winona Lake, Indiana: Eisenbrauns. ISBN 0-931464-31-5. Archived from the original on 26 May 2024.
- Watson, Janet C. E. (2002). The Phonology and Morphology of Arabic (PDF). New York: Oxford University Press. ISBN 0-19-824137-2. Archived from the original (PDF) on 1 March 2016 – via Wayback Machine.
- Woodard, Roger D., ed. (2008). The Ancient Languages of Syrio-Palestine and Arabia (PDF). Cambridge: Cambridge University Press. Archived (PDF) from the original on 11 November 2020.
- Wright, William; Smith, William Robertson (1890). Lectures on the Comparative Grammar of the Semitic Languages. Cambridge: Cambridge University Press. [2002 edition: ISBN 1-931956-12-X]
