= Pre-classical Arabic =

Early period of Arabic language development, before the Classical Arabic

Pre-Classical Arabic
- Native to: Historically in the Middle East, now used as a liturgical language of Islam
- Era: 5-4th century BCE - 4th century CE .
- Language family: Afro-Asiatic: Semitic; West Semitic; Central Semitic; North Arabian?; Arabic; Pre-Classical Arabic
- Early form: Old Arabic
- Dialects: Over 24 modern Arabic dialects

Language codes
- ISO 639-3: –
- Glottolog: None

Pre-classical Arabic is the cover term for all varieties of Arabic spoken by Arabs until immediately after the Arab conquests and emergence of Classical Arabic in the 7th century C.E. Scholars disagree about the status of these varieties.

Some scholars assume that the language of pre-Islamic poetry and the Quran was similar, if not identical, to the varieties spoken in the Arabian Peninsula before the emergence of Islam. If differences existed, they concerned mainly stylistic and minor points of linguistic structure. A second group of mainly Western scholars of Arabic (Vollers 1906; Fleisch 1947; Kahle 1948; Rabin 1951; Blachère 1950; Wehr 1952; Spitaler 1953; Rosenthal 1953; Fleisch 1964; Zwettler 1978; Holes 1995; Owens 1998; Sharkawi 2005) do not regard the variety in which the Quran was revealed as a spoken variety of Arabic in the peninsula. Some of them (Zwettler 1978; Sharkawi 2005) go so far as to state that the function of the language of pre-Islamic poetry and the Quran was limited to artistic expression and oral rendition (poetic koine). Others are not as clear about the functional load of this variety in pre-Islamic times. A third group of scholars (Geyer 1909; Nöldeke 1904, 1910; Kahle 1948) assume that the variety of Arabic of pre-Islamic poetry and the Quran was the variety spoken by Bedouin Arab tribes and non sedentary Arabs, at least in the western parts of the peninsula where trade routes existed.

Some modern scholars of Arabic believe that the Classical Arabic grammarians held their view, that the language of pre-Islamic poetry and the Quran was identical with at least the spoken varieties of some Arab tribes in the peninsula (Rabin 1955:21–22; Sharkawi 2005:5–6). A first reading of the grammatical texts seems to confirm that grammarians were quite aware of the existence of different language varieties in the Arabic-speaking sphere. They distinguished terminologically between luġa ‘dialect’ and lisān ‘language’ (ˀAnīs 1952:16–17; Naṣṣār 1988:58). Among several meanings of the word luġa is the technical meaning of a linguistic variety (Rabin 1951:9).

As early as the 2nd century A.H., grammarians were aware of differences among the dialects. Among the earliest writers on tribal dialects were Yunus ibn Ḥabīb (d. 182/798) and ˀAbū ˁAmr aš-Šaybānī (d. 213/828), the author of the Kitāb al-Jīm, in which odd and archaic lexical items used in certain tribes are recorded.

== Dialects ==
=== Hijaz dialect ===
Old Hijazi features appear in the grammarians’ books more frequently than features of any other dialect. It is, therefore, a much better represented dialect in comparison to others, despite the fact that the region's geographical definition is not as clear. In pre-Islamic times, the Hijaz was the western part of the peninsula, between the Tihama in the southwest and the Najd in the east. It included the Banū Sulaym and the Banū Hilāl. In the north was the territory of Bālī, and in the south that of Huḏayl. After the advent of Islam, the Tihāma was included in the Hijaz, thus the Bedouin tribes in the interior were sometimes included in the Hijaz. It seems that for the grammarians, Hijaz referred to regions defined according to the post-Islamic demarcation. In this way, the urban centers of Mecca, Medina, and Ṯaqīf were included in that region. The term luġa ahl al-Hijaz covers all differences that may have existed within this region.

Phonological features of this region include:

1. The pronunciation of /ˁ/ as hamza.
2. The use of the full forms of vowels, without elision or vowel changes, e.g. ˁunuq ‘neck’ as against ˁunq in Eastern Arabian dialects, where short unstressed vowels were elided.
3. The absence of vowel harmony, which was realized in Eastern dialects, e.g. Hijazi baˁīr ‘camel’, corresponding to Eastern biˁīr. By the same token, uvular and pharyngeal consonants assimilated following vowels in the Eastern dialects, while in the Hijaz they rested immune, e.g. Hijazi ˁuqr ‘the main part of the house’, corresponding to Eastern ˁaqr. In the neighborhood of uvulars and pharyngeals, the Hijaz had /u/, while the Eastern dialects had /a/.
4. The tendency to shorten the long final vowels in pause positions (likely with keeping the stress for distinction, e.g. /ˈkataba/ ‘he wrote’, and /kataˈbaː/ > /kataˈba/ ‘they two (masc.) wrote’).
5. The elision of the hamza.

Morphological features of this dialect include:

1. The 3rd person suffix pronouns -hu, -humā,-hum, and -hunna did not change to the -hi form after i or ī.
2. For the singular relative pronoun, the Hijaz used allaḏī rather than the Western and Yemenite ḏī and ḏū. For the feminine plural, the Hijaz used allāˀī. The same form may have been used for the masculine plural as well.
3. The dual suffix in the Hijaz may have had a single form, -āni, for the nominative, accusative, and genitive cases alike. Ibn Hišām (Muġnī I, 37), in his explanation of the nominative case of the demonstrative pronoun hāḏāni ‘these two’ in the verse ˀinna hāḏāni la-sāḥirāni (Q. 20/63), claimed that in the dialect of the Hijaz, these demonstrative pronouns were indeclinable.
4. The absence of taltala.
5. The imperative of geminated verbs was conjugated as the strong verbs, e.g. urdud ‘respond!’.

Syntactic features of this dialect include:

1. Some nouns were feminine in the Hijaz and masculine in the Najd and Tamīm. Some examples are tamr ‘dates’, šaˁīr ‘barley’, ṣirāṭ ‘path’. The word ṣirāṭ appears in the first sūra of the Qurān (Q.1/6) followed by a masculine adjective (ṣirāṭ mustaqīm).
2. In the Hijaz, the predicate of verbal sentences agreed in number with the head verb (known as the luġa ˀakalūnī l-barāġīṯ), unlike Standard Arabic, where the head verb is always in the singular.
3. In the Hijaz, after the shortened forms ˀin and ˀan, the subject took an accusative case, while in Classical Arabic and in the east, shortened particles lost their effect on the following nominal clause.
4. After the complementizer ˀinna, ˀanna, etc. the Hijazi dialect put the subject and predicate of the sentence in the accusative case. Ibn Hišām (Muġnī I, 36) explains the agreement in case between the subject and predicate in a nominal sentence after ±inna ‘in one version of a ḥadīṯ (±inna qaˁra jahannama sabˁīna xarīfan) by saying that the Hijaz did not distinguish between the subject and predicate in case endings after ˀinna.
5. The predicate of kāna and other copulas (kāna wa-ˀaxawātuhā) was given a nominative case, while an accusative case is assigned to it in Classical Arabic.
6. In the Hijaz, mā, lā, and ˀin had the same effect as the Classical Arabic laysa in assigning to the subject the nominative case and to the predicate the accusative case.
7. Verbs in the indicative were used after ±an. An example comes from Mujāhid (d. 104/722), who read the verse li-man ˀarāda ˀan yutimma r-raḍāˁata ‘for those who want the suckling (period) to be completed’ with an indicative ending, yutimmu (Q. 2/233).

=== ˀAzd dialect ===
The ˀAzd dialect is rarely mentioned in the literature. Whereas anecdotes and šawāhid from other Yemeni dialects are given, the dialect of ˀAzd receives little attention. More confusing still is the fact that there were two tribes by the name of ˀAzd, one in Oman and the other in the western part of Yemen. The two features that are mentioned, however, show the difference between this dialect and the rest of Yemen.

1. The retention of the nominal case endings a, i, and u in the pausal position.
2. The retention of the vowel a in the prefixes of the imperfect, e.g. yaktub ‘he writes’ as against the taltala in other dialects.

=== Huḏayl dialect ===
The tribe of Huḏayl was situated in the southeastern part of the Hijaz, to the north of Yemen and to the northeast of ˀAzd. Its location in the southeast of the Hijaz connected this tribe geographically to the Eastern dialect group, which earned the tribe its fame for speaking wellformed Arabic. Despite this connection with the east, the dialect of Huḏayl belonged mainly to the Western group and functioned as an intermediate zone between the Hijaz and northern Yemen (Rabin 1951:79). The evidence for this claim comes from the grammatical and lexical features it shared with the Western group. They shared, for instance, ˀawwāb ‘obedient’ and jadaṯ ‘tomb’ with Kināna.

Other features mentioned by the grammarians include:

1. The insertion of short unstressed vowels in the middle of words, e.g. ibin ‘son’ instead of Classical Arabic ibn, and jawazāt ‘nuts’, sg. jawza. In Classical Arabic, words with a singular pattern faˁla receive an anaptyctic vowel a in the feminine plural, to become faˁalāt. This vowel is not added when the second radical in the root is w or y, but Huḏayl added an anaptyctic vowel to roots containing w and y as well.
2. The absence of vowel harmony.
3. The absence of the hamza.
4. It is probable that in Huḏayl the final long vowels were shortened, as was the case in the Hijaz.
5. The change of the glides wu and wi into the long vowels ū and ī, respectively.
6. Huḏayl used the relative pronoun allaḏī. The plural of this pronoun was allaḏūna, in all numbers and genders, in opposition to Classical Arabic, which uses allaḏīna.
7. Concerning the taltala feature, Huḏayl was claimed to have used both forms: -a- imperfect like the Hijaz dialects, and -i imperfect like the eastern tribes. This variation is also common in Ṭayyiˀ. Both tribes had contact with eastern tribes, which may explain the variation.

=== Ṭayyiˀ dialect ===
The Ṭayyiˀ tribe was situated in the north of the Najd. It occupied the southern frontiers of the Nufūd desert and was also situated toward the northeast of the Hijaz region. It shared with the tribes of the eastern part some linguistic features, such as the taltala. Rabin (1951:193) claims that such common features are suggestive of the connecting role this tribe played between the dialects of the eastern and western parts of the peninsula. The territory of Ṭayyiˀ during the early Islamic period was not the original habitat of the tribe. The tribe was traditionally known to have migrated from northern Yemen together with the tribes with which it shared some linguistic features.

Features of this dialect include:

1. The weakening of the final syllable and elision of final nasals, laterals, t, and/or y.
2. The absence of vowel harmony and vowel elision.
3. The change of /ˁ/ into /ˀ/, e.g. daˀ-nī ‘let me’; no other data about depharyngealization are available.
4. The fate of hamza in this dialect is not known due to the absence of direct evidence.
5. The suffix pronoun of the 3rd person feminine in pause was -ah and -hā in context, which is in accordance with the Classical and Eastern Arabic weakening of final syllables.
6. The form of the article was am-.
7. The singular feminine demonstrative was tā, not hāḏihi.
8. The relative pronoun was ḏū, which was used for the two genders and all numbers.
9. The -t of the feminine plural was dropped in pause; again, this is in harmony with the weakening of final syllables.
10. az-Zajjaji (Šarh 152) claims that as in the Hijaz, the predicate of verbal sentences agreed in number with the head verb.

=== Yemeni Arabic ===
The dialect of Yemen was very well represented in the writings of the grammarians because of the special interest it held for the scholars of the 3rd and 4th centuries A.H., especially for lexicographers like Ibn Durayd (d. 321/933) and Našwān (d. 573/1178). Although home to a host of South Arabian dialects, Yemen does not reflect much South Arabian influence, except for some lexical items that may be mere loanwords from that language. A good example is the word baˁl ‘lord’, which is still common in Mehri (Rabin 1951:25–27). During the time of al-Hamadānī (d. after 360/971), the main source on Yemen, a dialect similar to the Central Arabian Bedouin dialects was spoken in the region east of Sarāt and in the extreme south. Al-Hamadānī describes these dialects as ‘correct’ Arabic. In the central and western regions of the Sarāt, different dialects were spoken. These dialects are characterized by al-Hamadānī as mutawassi† ‘middle’. Rabin (1951:45) claims that this attribute must mean that they were mixtures of Arabic and Himyaritic. In the southern part of Sarāt and the mountains around Sanˁāˀ, the language showed strong traces of Himyaritic. In the area to the west, a mixture of Arabic and Himyaritic was spoken. In the villages, however, Himyaritic was predominant. Outside the villages, in the nomadic areas, West Arabian dialects were spoken (Rabin 1951:45). Thus, there were two linguistic communities in Yemen, apart from the Bedouin in the east. The first was that of the settled farmer groups, which spoke a mixture of Himyaritic and Arabic, while the other group consisted of the nomadic people who spoke West Arabian dialects. Although the Yemeni dialects spoken in this region were very similar to other Arabic dialects, Arabs considered them incomprehensible. There are several anecdotes in the literature showing that Arabs did not consider the dialects of Himyar Arabic to be similar to their own. The attribute ṭumṭumāniyya was given in the literature to the Himyaritic dialect as a form of mockery. The northern Yemen region hosted tribes speaking dialects so similar to each other that they could be considered a defined group. This group was different from the rest of Yemen in the south and Huḏayl and the Hijāz in the north. Despite being distinct from both groups, the dialects of northern Yemen exhibited similarities with both. Rabin (1951:64) claims that because grammarians often ascribed Hijazī dialect features to Kināna, this region can be considered as an extension to the West Arabian dialect group. Among the tribes that lived in this region were Kināna, Xaṯˁam, Hamadān, ˁAnbar, Zubayd, and Murād. The first four of these tribes are frequently mentioned in literature, but whenever a feature is mentioned as belonging to a certain tribe, it may have applied to the rest of the tribes as well. Rabin (1951:64) also assumes that whenever the grammarians mention the tribes of Yemen, they mean these tribes living in the northern part.

Among the features mentioned for these dialects are the following:

1. The absence of ˀimāla. Al-Hamadānī, however, states that the Bedouin tribe of Banū Harb in the south realized ˀimāla.
2. The realization of hamza. However, in some cases the original hamza of the word was changed into the glide w. An example is ±ātaytu/wātaytu ‘I obeyed’. This feature is still heard in some modern dialects.
3. In some Yemenite dialects, the feminine ending -at was generalized to pause positions. Yemenite dialect words may have received tanwīn even in the pause position.
4. The definite article of the Yemenite dialect was am-. Unlike the Arabic definite article al-, it was not assimilated to dental and sibilant consonants. Words that received this article could also be given tanwīn. An example is found in al-Firuzabadī's Muḥīṭ (I, 37): mani m-qāˀimun ‘who is standing?’
5. The dual suffix in northern Yemen, -āni, was suffixed to the noun. Although other tribes in the peninsula used a single dual ending as well, they coupled it with a different treatment of the final short vowel. They either used -āna as a fixed form or inflected the ending. This feature was ascribed to Dabba in the northwest of the Empty Quarter, which shows that this feature cut across dialect boundaries.
6. There was a sentence-initial particle ±am that was used with the verb in the imperfect (Rabin 1951:37). vii. In southern Yemen, especially in ðufār, the demonstrative pronoun for both genders was ḏī, which followed the noun it modified, e.g. iš-šuÿl ḏī ‘this work’ (Rabin 1951:75).
7. The relative pronoun was ḏī, without distinction for gender or number. It was used in western Ḥaḍramawt and elsewhere. In other places of Yemen and as far north as Huḏayl, the Classical Arabic pronoun allaḏī was used, but without distinction for number or gender.
8. The negative particle was dū. Another form, still used in Taˁizz, in the southernmost part of Yemen, is da±. This particle may stem from £imyaritic, since a particle da± was found in some of the South Arabian inscriptions around the middle of the 6th century C.E.
9. The suffix of the 1st and 2nd persons of the verb in the perfect is -k, not -t. A good example is the saying of a woman: raˀayku bi-ḥulm kawaladku ibnan min ṭīb ‘I saw in a dream that I gave birth to a son of gold’. The verbs raˀayku ‘I saw’ and waladku ‘I gave birth’ end in this suffix. The same use is still current in the Yemeni countryside
