= Edward E. Salisbury =

American Sanskritist and Arabist (1814–1901)

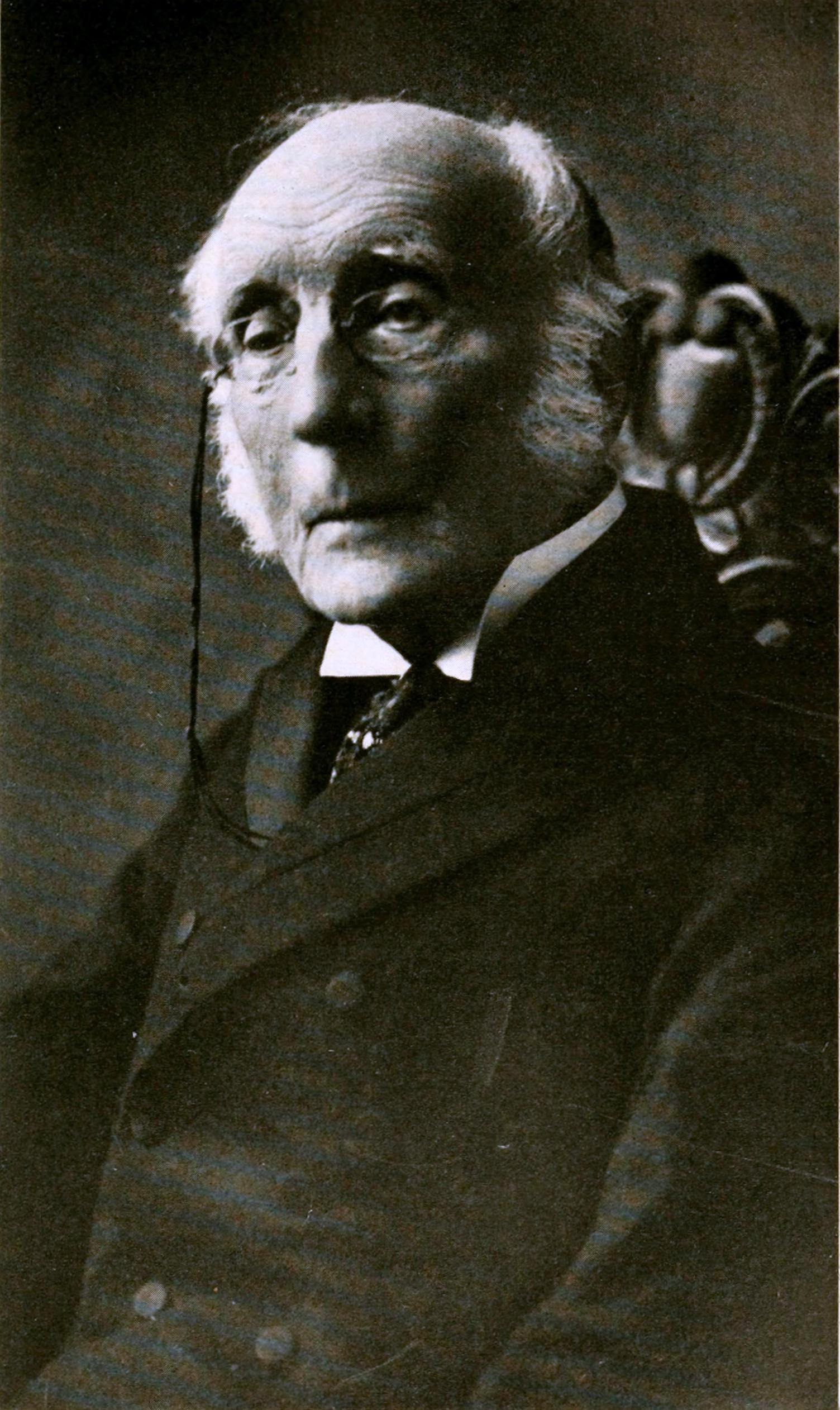
- Born: Edward Elbridge Salisbury; April 6, 1814; Boston, Massachusetts
- Died: February 5, 1901 (aged 86); New Haven, Connecticut
- Education: Yale University
- Occupation: Sanskritist
- Spouse: Abigail Salisbury Phillips

Signature
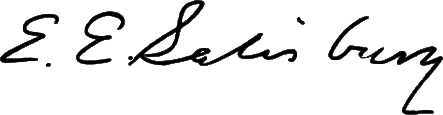

Edward Elbridge Salisbury (April 6, 1814 – February 5, 1901) was an American Sanskritist and Arabist.

== Biography ==
Edward E. Salisbury was born in Boston on April 6, 1814. He graduated from Yale University in 1832. He married Abigail Salisbury Phillips in 1836 and they toured throughout Europe for three years. Salisbury was appointed Professor of Arabic and Sanskrit at Yale in 1841. The position of Salisbury was the only University Chair of Sanskrit in America till 1854, when a separate "Professorship of Sanskrit and kindred languages" was created with William Dwight Whitney as its first incumbent.

Salisbury also served as the President of the American Oriental Society from 1863 to 1866, and again from 1873 to 1880.

Salisbury was elected member of the Asiatic Society of Paris, Connecticut Academy of Arts and Sciences and corresponding member of the German Oriental Society. He was elected a member of the American Antiquarian Society in 1861. He was conferred the degree of LL.D. twice, first by Yale University in 1869, and again by Harvard University in 1886.

In 1866, Salisbury published an English translation of the Kitab al-Majmu, an Arabic work allegedly used in the Alawite religion.

He died from pneumonia in New Haven, Connecticut on February 5, 1901.
