= Assyrian studies =

Assyrian studies may refer to:

- Assyriology, the study of ancient cultures that used cuneiform writing
- The study of modern Assyrians, their history, languages, religions, culture, and diaspora
  - Assyrian Studies Association, an academic, educational, and minority organization of Assyrians in the United States
