= Mangesh =

Mangesh may refer to:

- Mangesh, a masculine given name and a surname
- Mangesh, a name of the god Shiva
- Mangesh, Iraq, a town in Kurdistan Region, Iraq
- Mangeshi Village, a village in Priol, Ponda, Goa, India
  - Mangueshi Temple, Mangeshi Village
