= Suret language =

Neo-Aramaic varieties

Suret
- Assyrian Neo-Aramaic; Chaldean Neo-Aramaic; Chaldo-Assyrian Neo-Aramaic
- ܣܘܪܝܬ Sūret
- Sūret written in Swāḏāyā (vernacular Eastern) Syriac
- Pronunciation: [ˈsuːrɪtʰ], [ˈsuːrɪθ]
- Native to: Iran, Iraq, Syria, Turkey
- Region: Assyrian heartland (northwestern Iran, northern Iraq, northern Syria, eastern & southern Turkey), Lebanon, Armenia, Georgia global diaspora
- Ethnicity: Assyrians
- Native speakers: 940,000 (2024)
- Language family: Afro-Asiatic: Semitic; Central Semitic; Northwest Semitic; Aramaic; Eastern; Northeastern; Suret
- Early forms: Proto-Afroasiatic: Proto-Semitic; Old Aramaic; Middle Aramaic; Eastern Middle Aramaic; Northeastern Neo-Aramaic
- Dialects: Christian Urmi Neo-Aramaic, including Urban Koine; Nōčiyay; Hakkari groups (Barwari, Jilu, Tyari); Southern (Arbela, Nineveh); others
- Writing system: Swāḏāyā (vernacular Eastern) Syriac

Official status
- Recognised minority language in: Armenia (Assyrian, specifically the Suret dialect, is recognized as a minority language in Armenia, meaning it is acknowledged and can be taught as a mother tongue); Iraq (recognized language and a constitutional right to educate in the mother tongue)

Language codes
- ISO 639-3: syr – inclusive code Individual codes: aii – Assyrian Neo-Aramaic cld – Chaldean Neo-Aramaic
- Glottolog: assy1241 Assyrian Neo-Aramaic chal1275 Chaldean Neo-Aramaic
- ELP: Aširat Northeastern Neo-Aramaic
- Suret is classified as Definitely Endangered by the UNESCO Atlas of the World's Languages in Danger (2010)
- Spoken Assyrian Neo-Aramaic The Urmi dialect, spoken by TV presenter Maryam Shamalta.

Suret (Syriac: ܣܘܪܝܬ, pronounced [ˈsuːrɪtʰ], [ˈsuːrɪθ]), also known as Assyrian, is any of several varieties of Northeastern Neo-Aramaic (NENA) spoken by the modern Assyrian people. The various NENA dialects descend from Old Aramaic, the lingua franca in the later phase of the Assyrian Empire, which slowly displaced and was influenced by the East Semitic Akkadian language beginning around the 10th century BC. They have been further heavily influenced by Classical Syriac, the Middle Aramaic dialect of Edessa, after its adoption as an official liturgical language of the Syriac churches, but Suret is not a direct descendant of Classical Syriac.

Suret-speaking Assyrians are indigenous to Upper Mesopotamia, northwestern Iran, southeastern Anatolia and the northeastern Levant, which is a region encompassing the plain of Urmia in northwestern Iran through to the Nineveh Plains, Erbil, Kirkuk and Duhok regions in northern Iraq, together with the northeastern regions of Syria and to south-central and southeastern Turkey. Instability throughout the Middle East since the 20th century has led to a worldwide diaspora of Suret speakers, with most speakers now living abroad in such places as North America, Australia, western Europe, and Russia. Speakers of Suret and Turoyo (Surayt) are ethnic Assyrians and are the descendants of the ancient inhabitants of Mesopotamia.

SIL distinguishes between 'Chaldean' and 'Assyrian' as varieties of Suret on non-linguistic grounds. Suret is mutually intelligible with some NENA dialects spoken by Jews, especially in the western part of its historical extent. Its mutual intelligibility with Turoyo is partial and asymmetrical, but more significant in written form.

Suret is a moderately-inflected, fusional language with a two-gender noun system and rather flexible word order. There is some Akkadian influence on the language and its grammar. In its native region, speakers may use Iranian, Turkic and Arabic loanwords, while diaspora communities may use loanwords borrowed from the languages of their respective countries. Suret is written from right-to-left and it uses the Madnḥāyā version of the Syriac alphabet. Suret, alongside other modern Aramaic languages, is now considered endangered, as newer generations of Assyrians tend to not acquire the full language, mainly due to emigration and acculturation into their new resident countries. However, emigration has also had another effect: the language has gained more global attention, with several initiatives to digitize and preserve it, and the number of people learning Suret is considerably higher than before.

== History ==
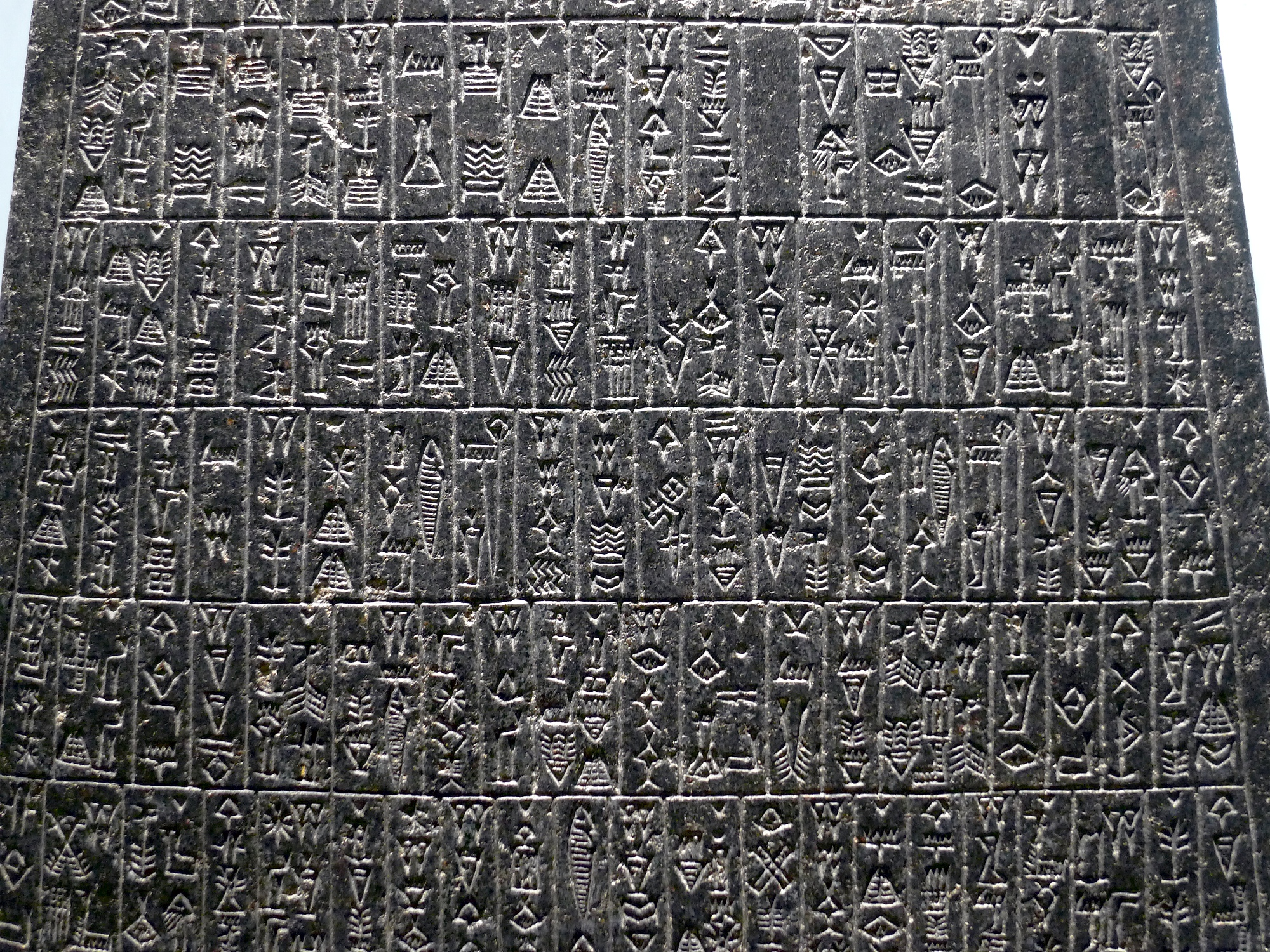
Manishtushu Obelisk in Akkadian language (detail). The obelisk was erected by Manishtushu, son of Sargon the Great, under the Akkadian Empire in Mesopotamia (modern-day Iraq) circa 2270–2255 BCE.

Akkadian and Aramaic have been in extensive contact since their old periods. Local unwritten Aramaic dialects emerged from Imperial Aramaic in Assyria. In around 700 BCE, Aramaic slowly started to replace Akkadian in Assyria, Babylonia and the Levant. Widespread bilingualism among Assyrian nationals was already present prior to the fall of the empire. The language transition was achievable because the two languages featured similarities in grammar and vocabulary, and because the 22-lettered Aramaic alphabet was simpler to learn than the Akkadian cuneiform which had over 600 signs. The converging process that took place between Assyrian Akkadian and Aramaic across all aspects of both languages and societies is known as Aramaic-Assyrian symbiosis.

Introduced as the official language of the Assyrian Empire by Tiglath-Pileser III (745–727 BCE), it became the language of commerce and trade, the vernacular language of Assyria in the late Iron Age and classical antiquity, and the lingua franca of the Neo-Assyrian Empire (911–605 BCE), Neo-Babylonian Empire (605–539 BCE), the Achaemenid Empire (539–323 BCE), the Parthian Empire (247 BCE – 224 AD) and the Sasanian Empire (224–651 AD). Following the Achaemenid conquest of Assyria under Darius I, the Aramaic language was adopted as the "vehicle for written communication between the different regions of the vast empire with its different peoples and languages". After the conquest of Assyria by the Seleucid Empire in the late 4th century BCE, Imperial Aramaic gradually lost its status as an imperial language, but continued to flourish alongside Ancient Greek.

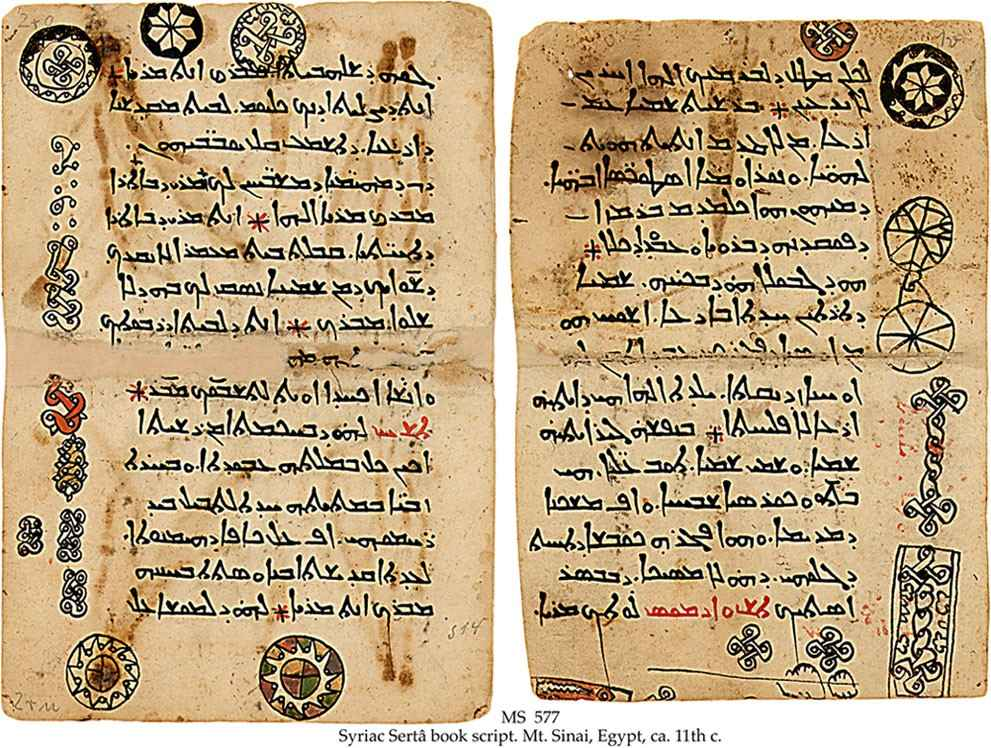
An 11th-century Classical Syriac manuscript, written in Serto script

By the 1st century AD, Akkadian was extinct, though vocabulary and grammatical features still survive in modern NENA dialects. The Neo-Aramaic languages evolved from Middle Syriac-Aramaic by the 13th century. There is evidence that the drive for the adoption of Syriac was led by missionaries. Much literary effort was put into the production of an authoritative translation of the Bible into Syriac, the Peshitta (ܦܫܝܛܬܐ, Pšīṭtā). At the same time, Ephrem the Syrian was producing the most treasured collection of poetry and theology in the Classical Syriac language.

By the 3rd century AD, churches in Urhay in the kingdom of Osroene began to use Classical Syriac as the language of worship and it became the literary and liturgical language of many churches in the Fertile Crescent. Syriac was the common tongue of the region, where it was the native language of the Fertile Crescent, surrounding areas, as well as in parts of Eastern Arabia. It was the dominant language until 900 AD, till it was supplanted by Greek and later Arabic in a centuries-long process having begun in the Arab conquests.

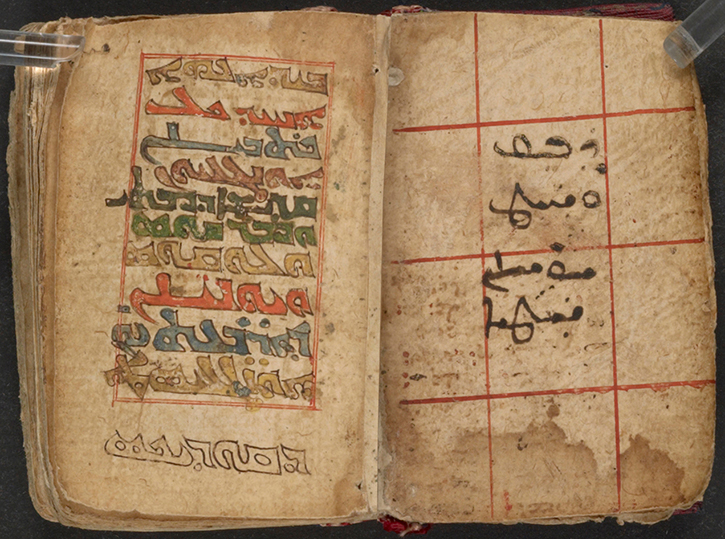
An 18th-century gospel Book from the Urmia region of Iran

The differences with the Church of the East led to the bitter Nestorian schism in the Syriac-speaking world. As a result of the schism as well as being split between living in the Byzantine Empire in the west and the Sasanian Empire in the east, Syrian-Aramaic developed distinctive Western and Eastern varieties. Although remaining a single language with a high level of comprehension between the varieties, the two employ distinctive variations in pronunciation and writing systems and, to a lesser degree, in vocabulary and grammar. During the course of the third and fourth centuries, the inhabitants of the region began to embrace Christianity. Because of theological differences, Syriac-speaking Christians bifurcated during the fifth century into the Church of the East, or East Syriac Rite, under the Sasanian Empire, and the Syriac Orthodox, or West Syriac Rite, under the Byzantine Empire. After this separation, the two groups developed distinct dialects differing primarily in the pronunciation and written symbolisation of vowels.

Post 2010, in Iraq, Chaldean Neo-Aramaic is mainly spoken in the Nineveh Plains and the cities around Mosul, Duhok, Erbil and Kirkuk (magenta).

The Mongol invasions of the Levant in the 13th century and the religiously motivated massacres of Assyrians by Timur further contributed to the rapid decline of the language. In many places outside of northern Mesopotamia, even in liturgy, the language was replaced by Arabic. "Modern Syriac-Aramaic" is a term occasionally used to refer to the modern Neo-Aramaic languages spoken by Christians, including Suret. Even if they cannot be positively identified as the direct descendants of attested Middle Syriac, they must have developed from closely related dialects belonging to the same branch of Aramaic, and the varieties spoken in Christian communities have long co-existed with and been influenced by Middle Syriac as a liturgical and literary language. Moreover, the name "Syriac", when used with no qualification, generally refers to one specific dialect of Middle Aramaic but not to Old Aramaic or to the various present-day Eastern and Central Neo-Aramaic languages descended from it or from close relatives.

In 2004, the Constitution of the Iraqi Kurdistan Region recognized Syriac in article 7, section four, stating, "Syriac shall be the language of education and culture for those who speak it in addition to the Kurdish language." In 2005, the Constitution of Iraq recognised it as one of the "official languages in the administrative units in which they constitute density of population" in article 4, section four.

== Script ==
=== History ===
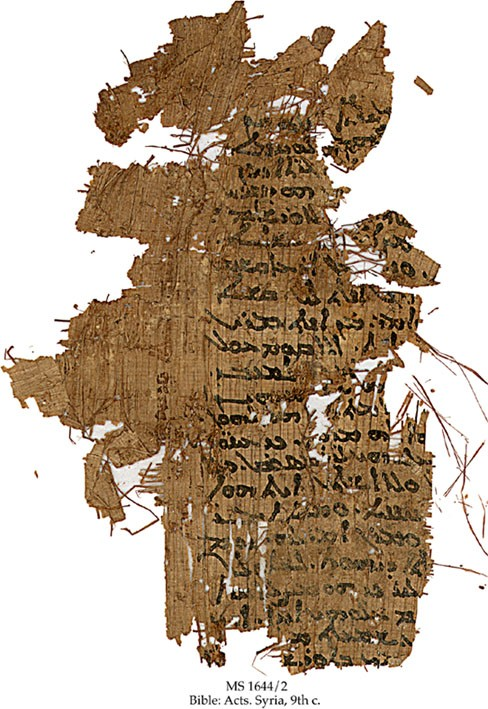
Papyrus fragment of the 9th century written in Serto variant. A passage from the Acts of the Apostles is recognizable

The original Mesopotamian writing system, believed to be the world's oldest, was derived around 3600 BC from this method of keeping accounts. By the end of the 4th millennium BC, the Mesopotamians were using a triangular-shaped stylus made from a reed pressed into soft clay to record numbers. Around 2700 BC, cuneiform began to represent syllables of spoken Sumerian, a language isolate genetically unrelated to the Semitic and Indo-Iranian languages that it neighboured. About that time, Mesopotamian cuneiform became a general purpose writing system for logograms, syllables and numbers. This script was adapted to another Mesopotamian language, the East Semitic Akkadian (Assyrian and Babylonian) around 2600 BC.

With the adoption of Aramaic as the lingua franca of the Neo-Assyrian Empire (911–609 BC), Old Aramaic was also adapted to Mesopotamian cuneiform. The last cuneiform scripts in Akkadian discovered thus far date from the 1st century AD. Various bronze lion-weights found in Nineveh featured both the Akkadian and Aramaic text etched on them, bearing the names of Assyrian kings, such as Shalmaneser III (858-824 B.C), King Sargon (721-705 B.C) and Sennacherib (704-681 B.C). Indication of contemporaneous existence of the two languages in 4th century B.C. is present in an Aramaic document from Uruk written in cuneiform. In Babylon, Akkadian writing vanished by 140 B.C, with the exclusion of a few priests who used it for religious matters. Though it still continued to be employed for astronomical texts up until the common era.

The Syriac script is a writing system primarily used to write the Syriac language from the 1st century AD. It is one of the Semitic abjads directly descending from the Aramaic alphabet and shares similarities with the Phoenician, Hebrew, Arabic and the traditional Mongolian alphabets. The alphabet consists of 22 letters, all of which are consonants. It is a cursive script where some, but not all, letters connect within a word. Aramaic writing has been found as far north as Hadrian's Wall in Prehistoric Britain, in the form of inscriptions in Aramaic, made by Assyrian soldiers serving in the Roman Legions in northern England during the 2nd century AD.

=== Modern development ===
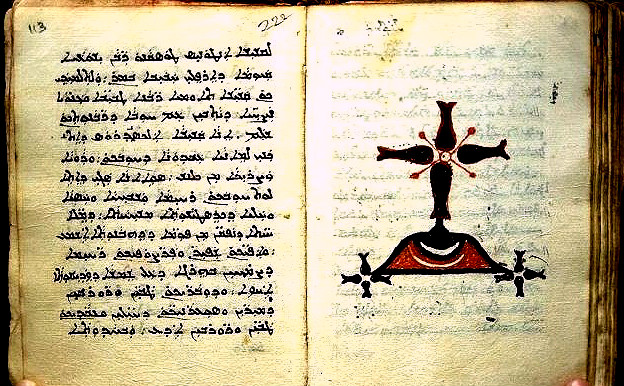
Classical Syriac written in Madnhāyā script. Thrissur, India, 1799

The oldest and classical form of the alphabet is ʾEsṭrangēlā (ܐܣܛܪܢܓܠܐ); the name is thought to derive from the Greek adjective στρογγύλη (strongúlē) 'round'. Although ʾEsṭrangēlā is no longer used as the main script for writing Syriac, it has undergone some revival since the 10th century.

When Arabic gradually began to be the dominant spoken language in the Fertile Crescent after the 7th century AD, texts were often written in Arabic with the Syriac script. Malayalam was also written with Syriac script and was called Suriyani Malayalam. Such non-Syriac languages written in Syriac script are called Garshuni or Karshuni.

The Madnhāyā, or 'eastern', version formed as a form of shorthand developed from ʾEsṭrangēlā and progressed further as handwriting patterns changed. The Madnhāyā version also possesses optional vowel markings to help pronounce Syriac. Other names for the script include Swāḏāyā, 'conversational', often translated as "contemporary", reflecting its use in writing modern Neo-Aramaic.

The sixth beatitude (Matthew 5:8) in Classical Syriac from the Peshitta (in Madnhāyā): ܛܘܼܒܲܝܗܘܿܢ ܠܐܲܝܠܹܝܢ ܕܲܕ݂ܟܹܝܢ ܒܠܸܒ̇ܗܘܿܢ: ܕܗܸܢ݂ܘܿܢ ܢܸܚܙܘܿܢ ܠܐܲܠܵܗܵܐ܂ Ṭūḇayhōn l-ʾaylên da-ḏḵên b-lebbhōn, d-hennōn neḥzon l-ʾǎlāhā. In the Neo-Aramaic of the Urmi Bible of 1893, this is rendered as: ܛܘܼܒ̣ܵܐ ܠܐܵܢܝܼ ܕܝܼܢܵܐ ܕܸܟ̣ܝܹ̈ܐ ܒܠܸܒܵܐ: ܣܵܒܵܒ ܕܐܵܢܝܼ ܒܸܬ ܚܵܙܝܼ ܠܐܲܠܵܗܵܐ. Ṭūḇā l-ʾānī d-ʾīnā diḵyē b-libbā, sābāb d-ʾānī bit xāzī l-ʾalāhā. 'Blessed are the pure in heart, for they shall see God.'

=== Letters ===
Syriac alphabet
(200 BCE–present)
ܐ ܒ ܓ ܕ ܗ ܘ
ܙ ܚ ܛ ܝ ܟܟ ܠ
ܡܡ ܢܢ ܣ ܥ ܦ
ܨ ܩ ܪ ܫ ܬ

Three letters act as matres lectionis: rather than being a consonant, they indicate a vowel. ʾĀlep̄ (ܐ), the first letter, represents a glottal stop, but it can also indicate the presence of certain vowels (typically at the beginning or the end of a word, but also in the middle). The letter Waw (ܘ) is the consonant w, but can also represent the vowels o and u. Likewise, the letter Yōḏ (ܝ) represents the consonant y, but it also stands for the vowels i and e. In addition to foreign sounds, a marking system is used to distinguish qūššāyā ('hard' letters) from rūkkāḵā ('soft' letters). The letters Bēṯ, Gāmal, Dālaṯ, Kāp̄, Pē and Taw, all plosives ('hard'), are able to be spirantised into fricatives ('soft').

The system involves placing a single dot underneath the letter to give its 'soft' variant and a dot above the letter to give its 'hard' variant (though, in modern usage, no mark at all is usually used to indicate the 'hard' value).

=== Latin alphabet ===
In the late 1920s, a Cyrillic alphabet was developed during the Soviet Union (U.S.S.R.). Though this specific script was removed from use in favor of a Latin script in around 1930 (which too was abolished in 1938), the Latin script in general is preferred by most Assyrians for practical reasons and its convenience, especially in social media, where it is used to communicate. Although the Syriac latin alphabet contains diacritics, most Assyrians rarely utilise the modified letters and would conveniently rely on the basic Latin alphabet. The Latin alphabet is also a useful tool to present Assyrian terminology to anyone who is not familiar with the Syriac script. A precise transcription may not be necessary for native Suret speakers, as they would be able to pronounce words correctly, but it can be very helpful for those not quite familiar with Syriac and more informed with the Latin script.

== Phonology ==
=== Consonants ===
Consonant inventory
		Labial		Dental/ Alveolar			Palatal		Velar		Uvular	Pharyn- geal		Glottal
		Labial		plain		emp.	Palatal		Velar		Uvular	Pharyn- geal		Glottal
Nasal			m		n									
Stop	plain	p	b	t	d	tˤ	(c	ɟ)	k	ɡ	q			ʔ
Stop	aspirated	pʰ	bʱ	tʰ	dʱ		(cʰ	ɟʱ)	kʰ	ɡʱ				
Affricate	plain						tʃ	dʒ						
Affricate	aspirated						tʃʰ	dʒʱ						
Fricative	sibilant			s	z	sˤ	ʃ	ʒ						
Fricative	non-sibilant	f	v	θ	ð				x		ɣ	ħ	ʕ	h
Approximant			w		l			j						
Trill/Tap					ɾ~r									

Notes:

- In all NENA dialects, voiced, voiceless, aspirated and emphatic consonants are recognised as distinct phonemes, though there can be an overlap between plain voiceless and voiceless emphatic in sound quality.
- In Iraqi Koine and many Urmian & Northern dialects, the palatals [c], [ɟ] and aspirate [cʰ], [ɟʱ] are considered the predominant realisation of /k/, /ɡ/ and aspirate /kʰ/, /ɡʱ/.
- In the Koine and Urmi dialects, velar fricatives /x ɣ/ are typically uvular as [χ ʁ].
- The phoneme /ħ/ is in most dialects realised as [x]. The one exception to this is the dialect of Hértevin, which merged the two historical phonemes into [ħ], thus lacking [x] instead.
- The pharyngeal /ʕ/, represented by the letter 'e, is a marginal phoneme that is generally upheld in formal or religious speech. Among the majority of Suret speakers, 'e would be realised as [aɪ̯], [eɪ̯], [ɛ], [j], deleted, or even geminating the previous consonant, depending on the dialect and phonological context.
- /r/ may also be heard as a tap sound [ɾ].
- /f/ is a phoneme heard in the Tyari, Barwari and Chaldean dialects. In most of the other varieties, it merges with /p/, though [f] is found in loanwords.
- The phonemes /t/ and /d/ have allophonic realisations of [θ] and [ð] (respectively) in most Lower Tyari, Barwari and Chaldean dialects, which is a carryover of begadkefat from the Ancient Aramaic period.
- In the Upper Tyari dialects, /θ/ is realised as [ʃ] or [t]; in the Marga dialect, the /t/ may at times be replaced with [s].
- In the Urmian dialect, /w/ has a widespread allophone [ʋ] (it may vacillate to [v] for some speakers).
- In the Jilu dialect, /q/ is uttered as a tense [k]. This can also occur in other dialects.
- In the Iraqi Koine dialect, a labial-palatal approximant sound [ɥ] is also heard.
- /ɡ/ is affricated, thus pronounced as [d͡ʒ] in some Urmian, Tyari and Nochiya dialects. /k/ would be affricated to [t͡ʃ] in the same process.
- /ɣ/ is a marginal phoneme that occurs across all dialects. Either a result of the historic splitting of /g/, through loanwords, or by contact of [x] with a voiced consonant.
- /ʒ/ is found predominately from loanwords, but, in some dialects, also from the voicing of /ʃ/ (e.g. ḥašbunā /xaʒbuːnaː/, "counting", from the root ḥ-š-b, "to count") as in the Jilu dialect.
- /n/ can be pronounced [ŋ] before velar consonants, [x] and [ɣ], and as [ɴ] before [q], and as [m] before labial consonants.
- In some speakers, a dental click (English "tsk") may be used para-linguistically as a negative response to a "yes or no" question. This feature is more common among those who still live in the homeland or in the Middle East, than those living in the diaspora.

=== Vowels ===
The vowel phonemes of Iraqi Koine

According to linguist Edward Odisho, there are six vowel phonemes in Iraqi Koine. They are as follows:

	Front	Central	Back
Close	/i/		/u/
Half-close	/ɪ/		
Half-open	/e/		/o/
Open	/a/		

- /a/, as commonly uttered in words like naša ("man; human"), is central [ä] for many speakers. It is usually [a] in the Urmian and Nochiya dialects. For some Urmian and Jilu speakers, [æ] may be used instead. In those having a more pronounced Jilu dialect, this vowel is mostly fronted and raised to [ɛ]. In the Tyari and Barwari dialects, it is usually more back [ɑ].
- /ɑ/, a long vowel, as heard in raba ("much; many"), may also be realised as [ɒ], depending on the speaker. It is more rounded and higher in the Urmian dialect, where it is realised as [ɔ].
- /e/, heard in beta ("house") is generally diphthongised to [eɪ̯] in the Halmon dialect (a Lower Tyari tribe). To note, the [aj] diphthong is a vestigial trait of classical Syriac and thereby may be used in formal speech as well, such as in liturgy and hymns.
- /ɪ/, uttered in words like dədwa ("housefly"), is sometimes realised as [ə] (a schwa).
- The mid vowels, preserved in Tyari, Barwari, Baz and Chaldean dialects, are sometimes raised and merged with close vowels in Urmian and some other dialects:
  - /o/, as in gora ("big"), is raised to [u]. The Urmian dialect may diphthongise it to [ʊj].
  - /e/, as in kepa ("rock"), is raised to [i].
- /o/, as in tora ("bull") may be diphthongised to [ɑw] in some Tyari, Barwari, Chaldean and Jilu dialects.
- Across many dialects, close and close-mid vowels are lax when they occur in a closed syllable:
  - /u/ or /o/ is usually realised as [ʊ];
  - /i/ or /e/ is usually realised as [ɪ].

East Syriac dialects may recognize half-close sounds as [ɛ] and also recognize the back vowel [ɒ] as a long form of /a/.

=== Phonology of Chaldean-Neo-Aramaic ===
==== Consonants ====
Table of Chaldean Neo-Aramaic consonant phonemes
		Labial		Dental/ Alveolar				Palatal		Velar		Uvular	Pharyngeal		Glottal
		Labial		plain		emph.		Palatal		Velar		Uvular	Pharyngeal		Glottal
Nasal			m		n										
Plosive		p	b	t	d	tˤ				k	ɡ	q			ʔ
Affricate								tʃ	dʒ						
Fricative	sibilant			s	z	sˤ		ʃ	ʒ						
Fricative	non-sibilant	f	v	θ	ð		ðˤ			x	ɣ		ħ	ʕ	h
Approximant			w		l		ɫ		j						
Rhotic					r		rˤ								

- The Chaldean dialects are generally characterised by the presence of the fricatives /θ/ (th) and /ð/ (dh) which correspond to /t/ and /d/, respectively, in other Assyrian dialects (excluding the Tyari dialect).
- In some Chaldean dialects /r/ is realized as [ɹ]. In others, it is either a tap [ɾ] or a trill [r].
- Unlike in Assyrian Neo-Aramaic, the guttural sounds of [ʕ] and [ħ] are used predominantly in Chaldean varieties; this is a feature also seen in other Northeastern Neo-Aramaic languages.

==== Vowels ====
	Front	Central	Back
Close	i	ɨ	u
Mid	e		o
Open		a	

== Grammar ==
NENA is a pro-drop, null-subject language with both ergative morphology and a nominative-accusative system.

Due to language contact, Suret may share similar grammatical features with Persian and Kurdish in the way they employ the negative copula in its full form before the verbal constituent and also with the negated forms of the present perfect.

Verbal stems

Aspect	Stem
Imperative	ptux ("open!")
Indicative	patx- ( + k- / ki- present, bit- future, qam- past, transitive, definite object) ("opens")
Perfect	ptix- (perfect participle, f. ptixta, m. ptixa, pl. ptixe) ("opened")
Gerund	(bi-)ptaxa ("opening")

=== Suffixes ===
Suret uses verbal inflections marking person and number. The suffix "-e" indicates a (usually masculine) plural (i.e. warda, "flower", becomes warde, "flowers"). Enclitic forms of personal pronouns are affixed to various parts of speech. As with the object pronoun, possessive pronouns are suffixes that are attached to the end of nouns to express possession similar to the English pronouns my, your, his, her, etc., which reflects the gender and plurality of the person or persons. This is a synthetic feature found in other Semitic languages and also in unrelated languages such as Finnish (Uralic), Persian (Indo-European) and Turkish (Turkic).

Moreover, unlike many other languages, Suret has virtually no means of deriving words by adding prefixes or suffixes to words. Instead, they are formed according to a limited number of templates applied to roots. Modern Assyrian, like Akkadian but unlike Arabic, has only "sound" plurals formed by means of a plural ending (i.e. no broken plurals formed by changing the word stem). As in all Semitic languages, some masculine nouns take the prototypically feminine plural ending (-tā).

==== Possessive suffixes ====
Iraqi Koine possessive suffixes
		singular	plural
1st person		betī (my house)	betan (our house)
2nd person	masc.	betux (your house)	betōxun (your house)
2nd person	fem.	betax (your house)	betōxun (your house)
3rd person	masc.	betū (his house)	betéh (their house)
3rd person	fem.	betō (her house)	betéh (their house)

Although possessive suffixes are more convenient and common, they can be optional for some people and seldom used, especially among those with the Tyari and Barwari dialects, which take a more analytic approach regarding possession, just like English possessive determiners. The following are periphrastic ways to express possession, using the word betā ("house") as a base (in Urmian/Iraqi Koine):

- my house: betā-it dīyī ("house-of mine")
- your (masc., sing.) house: betā-it dīyux ("house-of yours")
- your (fem., sing.) house: betā-it dīyax ("house-of yours")
- your (plural) house: betā-it dīyōxun ("house-of yours")
- 3rd person (masc., sing.): betā-it dīyū ("house-of his")
- 3rd person (fem., sing.): betā-it dīyō ("house-of hers")
- 3rd person (plural): betā-it dīyéh ("house-of theirs")

==== Stress ====
Hakkari dialects are generally stress-timed, whereas the Urmian and Iraqi Koine dialects may be more syllable-timed:

- An example of stress timing is noticeable in the word "qat", an adverb clause conjunction which translates to "so that" – The 'a' sound in "qat" is unstressed and thus would turn into a schwa if one would place the stress in the next word of the sentence, so; "mīri qat āzekh" becomes "mīri qət āzekh" ("I said that we go").
- Another example is observed in teen numerical range (13-19); In some dialects (particularly those of Hakkari), the words "īštāser" (sixteen) or "arbāser" (fourteen), among other teen numbers, the typically stressed vowel in the middle (long A) is reduced to a schwa, hence "īštəser" and "arbəser", respectively.

dīyeh ("his"), dīyéh ("theirs")
An unstressed -eh denotes a singular possessive form (masc.), whereas a stressed -éh is a third person plural possessive.

Although Suret, like all Semitic languages, is not a tonal language, a tonal stress is made on a plural possessive suffix -éh (i.e. dīyéh; "their") in the final vowel to tonally differentiate it from an unstressed -eh (i.e. dīyeh; "his"), which is a masculine singular possessive, with a standard stress pattern falling on the penult. The -eh used to denote a singular third person masculine possessive (e.g. bābeh, "his father"; aqleh, "his leg") is present in most of the traditional dialects in Hakkari and Nineveh Plains, but not for Urmian and some Iraqi Koine speakers, who instead use -ū for possessive "his" (e.g. bābū, "his father"; aqlū, "his leg"), whilst retaining the stress in -éh for "their".

This phenomenon however may not always be present, as some Hakkari speakers, especially those from Tyari and Barwar, would use analytic speech to denote possession. So, for instance, bābeh (literally, "father-his") would be uttered as bābā-id dīyeh (literally, "father-of his"). In Iraqi Koine and Urmian, the plural form and the third person plural possessive suffix of many words, such as wardeh and biyyeh ("flowers"/"eggs" and "their flower(s)"/"their eggs", respectively), would be homophones were it not for the varying, distinctive stress on the penult or ultima.

=== Determinative ===
When it comes to a determinative (like in English this, a, the, few, any, which, etc.), Suret generally has an absence of an article (English "the"), unlike other Semitic languages such as Arabic, which does use a definite article (Arabic: ال, al-). Demonstratives (āhā, āy/āw and ayyāhā/awwāhā translating to "this", "that" and "that one over there", respectively, demonstrating proximal, medial and distal deixis) are commonly utilised instead (e.g. āhā betā, "this house"), which can have the sense of "the". An indefinite article ("a(n)") can mark definiteness if the word is a direct object (but not a subject) by using the prepositional prefix "l-" paired with the proper suffix (e.g. šāqil qālāmā, "he takes a pen" vs. šāqil-lāh qālāmā, "he takes the pen"). Partitive articles may be used in some speech (e.g. bayyīton xačča miyyā?, which translates to "do you [pl.] want some water?").

In place of a definite article, Ancient Aramaic used the emphatic state, formed by the addition of the suffix: "-ā" for generally masculine words and "-t(h)ā" (if the word already ends in -ā) for feminine. The definite forms were pallāxā for "the (male) worker" and pallāxtā for "the (female) worker". Beginning even in the Classical Syriac era, when the prefixed preposition "d-" came into more popular use and replaced state Morphology for marking possession, the emphatic (definite) form of the word became dominant and the definite sense of the word merged with the indefinite sense so that pālāxā became "a/the (male) worker" and pālaxtā became "a/the (female) worker."

=== Consonantal root ===
Most NENA nouns and verbs are built from triconsonantal roots, which are a form of word formation in which the root is modified and which does not involve stringing morphemes together sequentially. Unlike Arabic, broken plurals are not present. Semitic languages typically utilise triconsonantal roots, forming a "grid" into which vowels may be inserted without affecting the basic root.

The root š-q-l (ܫ-ܩ-ܠ) has the basic meaning of "taking", and the following are some words that can be formed from this root:

- šqil-leh (ܫܩܝܼܠ ܠܹܗ): "he has taken" (literally "taken-by him")
- šāqil (ܫܵܩܸܠ): "he takes"
- šāqlā (ܫܵܩܠܵܐ): "she takes"
- šqul (ܫܩܘܿܠ): "take!"
- šqālā (ܫܩܵܠܵܐ): "taking"
- šqīlā (ܫܩܝܼܠܵܐ): "taken"

=== Tenses ===
Suret has lost the perfect and imperfect morphological tenses common in other Semitic languages. The present tense is usually marked with the subject pronoun followed by the participle; however, such pronouns are usually omitted in the case of the third person. This use of the participle to mark the present tense is the most common of a number of compound tenses that can be used to express varying senses of tense and aspect. Suret's new system of inflection is claimed to resemble that of the Indo-European languages, namely the Iranian languages. This assertion is founded on the utilisation of an active participle concerted with a copula and a passive participle with a genitive/dative element which is present in Old Persian and in Neo-Aramaic.

Both Modern Persian and Suret build the present perfect tense around the past/resultative participle in conjunct with the copula (though the placing and form of the copula unveil crucial differences). The more conservative Suret dialects lay the copula in its full shape before the verbal constituent. In the Iraqi and Iranian dialects, the previous construction is addressable with different types of the copula (e.g. deictic) but with the elemental copula only the cliticised form is permitted. Among conservative Urmian speakers, only the construction with the enclitic ordered after the verbal constituent is allowed. Due to language contact, the similarities between Kurdish and Modern Persian and the Urmian dialects become even more evident with their negated forms of present perfect, where they display close similarities.

A recent feature of Suret is the usage of the infinitive instead of the present base for the expression of the present progressive, which is also united with the copula. Although the language has some other varieties of the copula precedent to the verbal constituent, the common construction is with the infinitive and the basic copula cliticised to it. In the Jewish Neo-Aramaic dialect of Urmia, the symmetrical order of the constituents is with the present perfect tense. This structure of the NENA dialects is to be compared with the present progressive in Kurdish and Turkish as well, where the enclitic follows the infinitive. Such construction is present in Kurdish, where it is frequently combined with the locative element "in, with", which is akin to the preposition bi- preceding the infinitive in Suret (as in "bi-ktawen" meaning 'I'm writing'). The similarities of the constituents and their alignment in the present progressive construction in Suret is clearly attributed to influence from the neighbouring languages, such as the use of the infinitive for this construction and the employment of the enclitic copula after the verbal base in all verbal constructions, which is due to the impinging of the Kurdish and Turkish speech.

The morphology and the valency of the verb, and the arrangement of the grammatical roles should be noticed when it comes to the similarities with Kurdish. Unlike Old Persian, Modern Persian made no distinction between transitive and intransitive verbs, where it unspecialised the absolutive type of inflection. Different handling of inflection with transitive and intransitive verbs is also nonexistent in the NENA dialects. In contrast with Persian though, it was the ergative type that was generalised in NENA.

Persian and Suret verb tense comparison
Language	Transitive verb	Intransitive verb
Modern Persian	košte-am kill.PP-COP.1SG 'I killed'	āmade-am arrive.PP-COP.1SG 'I arrived'
Suret	qṭǝl-li kill.PP-1SG.OBL 'I killed'	dmǝx-li sleep.PP-1SG.OBL 'I went to sleep'

=== Ergativity ===
Although Aramaic has been a nominative-accusative language historically, split ergativity in Christian and Jewish Neo-Aramaic languages developed through interaction with ergative Iranian languages, such as Kurdish, which is spoken by the Muslim population of the region. Ergativity formed in the perfective aspect only (the imperfective aspect is nominative-accusative), whereas the subject, the original agent construction of the passive participle, was expressed as an oblique with dative case, and is presented by verb-agreement rather than case. The absolutive argument in transitive clauses is the syntactic object. The dialects of Kurdish make a concordant distinction between transitive and intransitive verbs by using a tense-split ergative pattern, which is present in the tense system of some NENA dialects; The nominative accusative type is made use of in the present for all the verbs and also for intransitive verbs in past tense and the ergative type is used instead for transitive verbs.

Unique among the Semitic languages, the development of ergativity in Northeastern Neo-Aramaic dialects involved the departure of original Aramaic tensed finite verbal forms. Thereafter, the active participle became the root of the Suret imperfective, while the passive participle evolved into the Suret perfective. The Extended-Ergative dialects, which include Iraqi Koine, Hakkari and Christian Urmian dialects, show the lowest state of ergativity and would mark unaccusative subjects and intransitive verbs in an ergative pattern.

Ergativity patterns
Perfective stem	Split-S (Jewish Sulemaniyya)	Dynamic-Stative (Jewish Urmi)	Extended-Erg (Christian Hakkari dialects)
he opened it	pləx-∅-le open-ABS-ERG	pləx-∅-le open-ABS-ERG	ptíx-∅-le open-MASC-ERG
it opened	plix-∅ open-ABS	pləx-le open-ERG	ptíx-le open-ERG
it got cut	qəṭe-∅ cut-ABS	qṭe-le cut-ERG	qṭí-le cut-ERG
it was ruined	xrəw-∅-le ruin-ABS-ERG	məxrəw-le-le ruin-ERG-ACC	xríw-∅-le ruin-ABS-ERG

== Vocabulary ==
One online Suret dictionary, Sureth Dictionary, lists a total 40,642 words–half of which are root words. Due to geographical proximity, Suret has an extensive number of Iranian loanwords–namely Persian and Kurdish–incorporated in its vocabulary, as well as some Arabic, Russian, Azeri and Ottoman Turkish and, increasingly within the last century, English loanwords.

Suret has numerous words borrowed into its vocabulary directly from Akkadian, some of them also being borrowed into neighbouring Semitic languages such as Arabic and Hebrew. Several of these words are not attested in Classical Edessan Syriac, many of them being agricultural terms, being more likely to survive by being spoken in agrarian rural communities rather than the urban centres like Edessa. A few deviations in pronunciation between the Akkadian and the Assyrian Aramaic words are probably due to mistranslations of cuneiform signs which can have several readings. While Akkadian nouns generally end in "-u" in the nominative case, Assyrian Neo-Aramaic words nouns end with the vowel "-a" in their lemma form.

Akkadian and Suret vocabulary (Note: Many Akkadian and Aramaic words share the same Semitic root and have cognates in Arabic and Hebrew as well. Therefore, the list below focuses on words that are direct loanwords (not cognates) from Akkadian into Suret. Other Semitic languages that have borrowed the word from Akkadian may be noted as well.)
Akkadian		Suret	Modern meaning	Notes
Cuneiform	Transliteration	Suret	Modern meaning	Notes
𒌉𒌉𒇲	daqqu	daiqa	very small, tiny	Compare Arabic daqīq (دَقِيق) "fine, thin, little"
𒂊𒄈𒌅	egirtu	iggarṯa	letter, epistle	Also borrowed into Hebrew iggéreṯ (אִגֶּרֶת), Turoyo/Surayt egarṯo. Compare Classical Mandaic engirta (ࡏࡍࡂࡉࡓࡕࡀ).
	elulu	ullul	up, upwards	Classical Syriac lʕel, Western Neo-Aramaic elʕel, Turoyo/Surayt lalʕal.
𒋓	išku	iškā	testicle	Cognate with Hebrew éšex (אֶשֶׁךְ).
𒀉	gappu	gulpa	wing	Cognate with Hebrew agaf (אֲגַף), Classical Syriac geppā, Turoyo/Surayt gefo.
	gir-ba-an-nu	qurbana	offering, sacrifice	Cognate with Arabic qurbān (قُرْبَان), borrowed into Hebrew as: qorban (קָרְבָּן).
𒄀𒅆𒅕𒊑	gišru	gišra	bridge	borrowed into Classical Syriac gešrā (ܓܫܪܐ); Arabic ǧisr (جِسْر), Hebrew géšer (גֶּשֶׁר), Western Neo-Aramaic ġešra, Turoyo/Surayt gešro.
	hadutu	ḥḏuṯa	joy, happiness	Western Neo-Aramaic ḥḏawṯa.
	ittimalu	timmal	yesterday	borrowed into Hebrew as: etmol (אֶתְמוֹל), Turoyo/Surayt aṯmel.
𒌆𒁇𒌆	kusītu	kosiṯa	hat, headgear	Compare Arabic kuswa (كُسْوَة), borrowed into Hebrew as: ksut - a garment; a cover (כְּסוּת) & ksayah (כְּסָיָה) - a covering
	kutallu	qḏala	neck	Arabic qaḏāl (قَذَال) "occiput", Western Neo-Aramaic qḏola, Turoyo/Surayt qḏolo.
𒈛	massu'u, mesû	msaya	to clean, wash clothes	Classical Syriac mšiġ, Western Neo-Aramaic imšiġ, Turoyo/Surayt mašeġ.
𒆳	mātu	maṯa	village; homeland	Borrowed into Turoyo/Surayt as moṯo (homeland).
	migru	myuqra	favourite, honourable	Borrowed into Turoyo/Surayt as miaqro.
𒈦𒂗𒆕	muškēnu	miskena	poor, impoverished	Arabic miskīn (مِسْكِين), borrowed into Hebrew as: misken (מִסְכֵּן), Western Neo-Aramaic miskina.
𒇽𒉽נׇפׇּח	nakru	naḵraya	foreign(er), outlandish	Compare Arabic nakira (نَكِرَة) "unknown", Classical Syriac nūḵrāyā (ܢܘܟܪܝܐ), Hebrew noxrî (נָכְרִי), Western Neo-Aramaic nuḵray, Turoyo/Surayt nuḵroyo. Compare Classical Mandaic nukraia (ࡍࡅࡊࡓࡀࡉࡀ).
	napahu	npaḥa	blow, exhale	Arabic nafaḵ (نَفَخ), Hebrew napaḥ (נׇפׇּח), Classical Syriac nfaḥ, Western Neo-Aramaic infaḥ, Turoyo/Surayt nfoḥo.
𒉈𒋢𒌒	našāgu	nšaqa	to kiss	Arabic našaq (نَشَق) "to snuff", Hebrew nšiqa (נְשִׁיקָה), Classical Syriac nšaq, Western Neo-Aramaic inšaq, Turoyo/Surayt nošaq.
𒄩	nunu	nuna	fish	Arabic nūn (نُون), Turoyo/Surayt nuno. Compare Classical Mandaic nuna (ࡍࡅࡍࡀ).
	paraku	praḥa	to fly, glide	Arabic farḵ (فَرْخ) "chick", Hebrew paraḥ (פָּרַח), Turoyo/Surayt foraš.
𒋻	parāsu	praša	to separate, part	Arabic faraš (فَرَش), Hebrew parash (פָּרַשׁ), Turoyo/Surayt fošar.
𒀭𒁇	parzillu	prezla	iron, metal	Hebrew barzel (בַּרְזֶל)
𒁔	pašāru	pšara	to melt, dissolve	Hebrew hafšara (הַפְשָׁרָה)
	qurbu	qurba	nearby	Arabic qurb (قُرْب), Hebrew qirvah, qeruv, qarov; Western Neo-Aramaic qura, Turoyo/Surayt qariwo.
𒃲	rabû	ra(b)ba	large, great (in quality or quantity)	Hebrew rav, rabu, & harbe; Western Neo-Aramaic rappa, Turoyo/Surayt rabo. Compare Mandaic rabbā (Classical Mandaic: ࡓࡁࡀ, romanized: rba).
𒋤	rêqu	reḥqa	far, distant	Hebrew raḥoq (רָחוֹק), Turoyo/Surayt raḥuqo.
	sananu	sanyana	hater, rival	Hebrew sone (שׂוֹנֵא), Western Neo-Aramaic sanyona.
𒄑𒃴	simmiltu	si(m)malta, si(m)manta	ladder	Borrowed into Classical Syriac as sebbelṯā (ܣܒܠܬܐ), Western Neo-Aramaic semla.
𒀲𒆳𒊏	sīsû	susa	horse	Compare Arabic sīsī (سيسي) "pony", Hebrew sus (סוּס), Western Neo-Aramaic susya, Turoyo/Surayt susyo.
𒊭𒁀𒁉𒅎	ša bābi	šḇaḇa	neighbour	Western Neo-Aramaic šboba.
𒂄	šahānu	šḥana	to warm, heat up	Arabic sāḵin (ساخِن), Hebrew šaḥun (שָׁחוּן), Classical Syriac šḥen, Western Neo-Aramaic: išḥen, Turoyo/Surayt šoḥan.
𒇽𒁁	šalamtu	šla(d)da	body, corpse	Hebrew šeled (שֶׁלֶד), Turoyo/Surayt šlado (corpse).
𒌑	šammu	samma	drug, poison	Arabic summ (سُمّ), Hebrew sam (סַם), Western Neo-Aramaic samma, Turoyo/Surayt samo.
	šuptu	šopa	place, spot	
𒄭	ṭābu	ṭaḇa	good, pleasant	Arabic ṭāb (طَابَ), Hebrew ṭova (טוֹבָה), Western Neo-Aramaic ṭoba, Turoyo/Surayt ṭowo. Compare Classical Mandaic ṭaba (ࡈࡀࡁࡀ).
	tapahu	tpaḥa	to pour out, spill	Arabic fāḵ (فَاخَ), compare the Hebrew cognate: to rise (e.g. rising flour) tafaḥ (תָּפַח)
	tayartu	dyara	to return, come back	Arabic dār (دَار), compare the Hebrew cognate: a tourist tayar (תַּיָּר), Turoyo/Surayt doʕar.
	temuru	ṭmara	to bury	
𒂡	zamāru	zmara	to sing	Arabic zammar (زَمَّر), Hebrew: tune, instance of singing: zimra (זִמְרָה), Turoyo/Surayt zomar.
𒍪𒊻	zuzu	zuze	money	Also borrowed into Hebrew zuz (זוּז) via Aramaic.

== Dialects ==
Map of the Assyrian dialects

SIL Ethnologue distinguishes five dialect groups: Urmian, Northern, Central, Western and Sapna, each with sub-dialects. Mutual intelligibility between the Suret dialects is as high as 80%–90%. The Urmia dialect has become the prestige dialect of Suret after 1836, when that dialect was chosen by Justin Perkins, an American Presbyterian missionary, for the creation of a standard literary dialect. A second standard dialect derived from General Urmian known as "Iraqi Koine", developed in the 20th century.

In 1852, Perkins's translation of the Bible into General Urmian was published by the American Bible Society with a parallel text of the Classical Syriac Peshitta. Iraqi Koine is a compromise between the rural Ashiret accents of Hakkari and Nineveh Plains (listed above) and the former prestigious dialect in Urmia. Iraqi Koine does not really constitute a new dialect, but an incomplete merger of dialects, with some speakers sounding more Urmian, such as those from Habbaniyah, and others more Hakkarian, such as those who immigrated from northern Iraq. Koine is more analogous or similar to Urmian in terms of manner of articulation, place of articulation and its consonant cluster formations than it is to the Hakkari dialects, though it just lacks the regional Persian influence in some consonants and vowels.

=== Grouping ===
Sample of the Urmian dialect. Note the Persian and Azerbaijani influences on cadence and pronunciation, particularly the use of [v], [ʊj] and the frequency of [t͡ʃ].

- Iranian group:
  - Urmia (west of Lake Urmia) (Christian Neo-Aramaic dialect of Urmia)
  - Sopurghan (north of Urmia)
  - Naghadeh (south of Lake Urmia)
  - Salmas (north west of Lake Urmia)
  - Sanandaj (Iranian Kurdistan) (Senaya dialect)
- Turkey group:
  - Nochiya
  - Jilu (west of Gavar and south of Qudshanis)
  - Gawar (between Salmas and Van)
  - Diza
  - Baz
  - Sample of a Lower Tyari dialect (Ashita). Notice the usage of [θ], [ð] and [aw]. The flow and cadence of this dialect may sound similar to that of Iraqi Arabic dialect.
    Lower Tyari – Dialects of the Tyari group share features with both the Chaldean Neo-Aramaic dialects in Northern Iraq (below) and Urmian (above).
    - Ashita
    - Zawita
    - Halmon/Geramon
    - Mangesh
  - Upper Tyari
    - Walto
  - Upper Barwari
    - Qudshanis (just south of Lake Van)
  - Tkhuma
  - Tal
  - Lewin
  - Bohtan (Neo-Aramaic dialect of Bohtan)
- Northern Iraq (Nineveh Plains):
  - Sample of the Alqosh dialect (voice by Chaldean Catholic Patriarch Amel Shamon Nona). Notice the usage of [ħ] and [ʕ], and the many Arabic loanwords (at least in this discourse)
    - Tel Keppe
    - Alqosh
    - Batnaya
    - Qaraqosh
    - Tesqopa
    - Zakho
    - Araden
  - Lower Barwari – The dialect within this group has more in common with Tyari than with Upper Barwari dialect
    - Dooreh
    - Hayes

=== Dialect continuum ===
Sample of the Iraqi Koine dialect (voice by Linda George). Notice how it combines the phonetic features of the Hakkari (Turkey) and Urmian (Iran) dialects

Neo-Aramaic has a rather slightly defined dialect continuum, starting from the Assyrians in northern Iraq (e.g. Alqosh, Batnaya) and ending with those in Western Iran (Urmia). The dialects in Northern Iraq, such as those of Alqosh and Batnaya, would be minimally unintelligible to those in Western Iran.

Nearing the Iraqi-Turkey border, the Barwari and Tyari dialects are more "traditionally Assyrian" and would sound like those in the Hakkari province in Turkey. Furthermore, the Barwar and Tyari dialects are "transitional", acquiring both Assyrian and Chaldean phonetic features (though they do not use /ħ/). Gawar, Diz and Jilu are in the "centre" of the spectrum, which lie halfway between Tyari and Urmia, having features of both respective dialects, though still being distinct in their own manner.

In Hakkari, going east (towards Iran), the Nochiya dialect would begin to sound distinct to the Tyari/Barwar dialects and more like the Urmian dialect in Urmia, West Azerbaijan province, containing a few Urmian features. The Urmian dialect, alongside Iraqi Koine, are considered to be "Standard Assyrian", though Iraqi Koine is more widespread and has thus become the more common standard dialect in recent times. Both Koine and Urmian share phonetic characteristics with the Nochiya dialect to some degree.

== Literature ==
Early Syriac texts still date to the 2nd century, notably the Syriac Bible and the Diatesseron Gospel harmony. The bulk of Syriac literary production dates to between the 4th and 8th centuries. Classical Syriac literacy survives into the 9th century, though Syriac Christian authors in this period increasingly wrote in Arabic. The emergence of spoken Neo-Aramaic is conventionally dated to the 13th century, but a number of authors continued producing literary works in Syriac in the later medieval period.

Because Assyrian, alongside Turoyo, is the most widely spoken variety of Syriac today, modern Syriac literature would therefore usually be written in those varieties. The conversion of the Mongols to Islam began a period of retreat and hardship for Syriac Christianity and its adherents, although there still has been a continuous stream of Syriac literature in Upper Mesopotamia and the Levant from the 14th century through to the present day. This has included the flourishing of literature from the various colloquial Eastern Aramaic Neo-Aramaic languages still spoken by Assyrians.

This Neo-Syriac literature bears a dual tradition: it continues the traditions of the Syriac literature of the past and it incorporates a converging stream of the less homogeneous spoken language. The first such flourishing of Neo-Syriac was the seventeenth century literature of the School of Alqosh, in northern Iraq. This literature led to the establishment of Assyrian Aramaic as written literary languages.

In the nineteenth century, printing presses were established in Urmia, in northern Iran. This led to the establishment of the 'General Urmian' dialect of Assyrian Neo-Aramaic as the standard in much Neo-Syriac Assyrian literature up until the 20th century. The Urmia Bible, published in 1852 by Justin Perkins was based on the Peshitta, where it included a parallel translation in the Urmian dialect. The comparative ease of modern publishing methods has encouraged other colloquial Neo-Aramaic languages, like Turoyo, to begin to produce literature.

== See also ==
- Assyrian people
- Aramaic
- Syriac alphabet
- Syriac language
- Mandaic

== Sources ==
- Beyer, Klaus (1986). The Aramaic Language: Its Distribution and Subdivisions. Göttingen: Vandenhoeck & Ruprecht. ISBN 978-3-525-53573-8.
- Brock, Sebastian P. (1989). "Three Thousand Years of Aramaic Literature". ARAM Periodical. 1 (1): 11–23.
- Brock, Sebastian P. (1992). Studies in Syriac Christianity: History, Literature, and Theology. Aldershot: Variorum. ISBN 978-0-86078-305-3.
- Brock, Sebastian P. (1996). Syriac Studies: A Classified Bibliography, 1960-1990. Kaslik: Parole de l'Orient.
- Brock, Sebastian P. (2006). Fire from Heaven: Studies in Syriac Theology and Liturgy. Aldershot: Ashgate. ISBN 978-0-7546-5908-2.
- Heinrichs, Wolfhart, ed. (1990). Studies in Neo-Aramaic. Atlanta: Scholars Press. ISBN 978-1-55540-430-7.
- Remarks on the Historical Background of the Modern Assyrian Language, Geoffrey Khan, University of Cambridge
- Maclean, Arthur John (1895). Grammar of the dialects of vernacular Syriac: as spoken by the Eastern Syrians of Kurdistan, north-west Persia, and the Plain of Mosul: with notices of the vernacular of the Jews of Azerbaijan and of Zakhu near Mosul. Cambridge University Press, London.
- Sara, Solomon I. (1974). A Description of Modern Chaldean. Mouton & Co.
- Yildiz, Efrem (1999). "The Assyrians: A Historical and Current Reality". Journal of Assyrian Academic Studies. 13 (1): 15–30.
- Yildiz, Efrem (2000a). "The Aramaic Language and Its Classification". Journal of Assyrian Academic Studies. 14 (1): 23–44.
- Yildiz, Efrem (2000b). "Los Asirio-Caldeos, Cristianos orientales arameoparlantes" (PDF). Dialogo Ecumenico. 35 (112): 263–282.
- Yildiz, Efrem (2012). "The Assyrian Linguistic Heritage and its Survival in Diaspora". The Assyrian Heritage: Threads of Continuity and Influence. Uppsala: Uppsala Universitet. pp. 201–220.
