= Operation Dawn 9 =

1986 Iran–Iraq War operation

- Part of the Iran–Iraq War
| Date | 24 February – 20 May 1986 |
| Location | Sulaymaniyah and Rawandiz, Iraq |
| Result | Iranian strategic failure: Minor gains for Iran; Successful Iraqi counter-attacks contains the Iranians; Iran failed to reach Sulaymaniyah and Rawandiz |

Belligerents
| Iraq | Iran (Kurdistan Region) Peshmerga |

Commanders and leaders
| (Iraq) Saddam Hussein | (Iran) Ruhollah Khomeini (Kurdistan Region) Masoud Barzani |

Operation Dawn 9 (Persian: عملیات والفجر 9) was a military operation during the Iran–Iraq War. It was launched on 24 February 1986 on the eastern area of Sulaymaniyah at the front of "northwest", which was performed by the Islamic Revolutionary Guard Corps.

The mentioned operation was commenced on 24 o'clock with the code of "Ya Allah" (Persian: یاالله). The goal of "operation dawn-9" was to approach the city of Sulaymaniyah in Iraq, and likewise fighting the gathering of Iraqi forces in Faw. The Iranian government claimed that more than 2,500 soldiers were killed/injured with 1,634 casualties for Iraqi army. The Iranian government claimed that Iran's forces captured several areas from Iraqis, including a few border checkpoints from the heights Kana, Sholeh-Kooran, Tange-Soor, MooBara, Makhlan, Kani-Maran, Sarv, heights 1470 and 1489.

On 23 April 1986 Iran took advantage of the bad weather to launch the second phase of Operation Dawn 9, and overran the Iraqi battalions guarding the Rawanduz sector. This was accelerated by a rear attack by hordes of Peshmerga from the mountains. On 15 May 1,000 Peshmerga troops backed by Iranian paratroopers took hold of Mangesh. Baghdad dispatched an armored brigade, a mountain brigade, and a special forces brigade supported by attack helicopters, which eventually recaptured Mangesh. Iraqi authorities doubled the amount of Popular Army troops in the region and armed Arab volunteer farmers to patrol the sector. On 20 May the Iranians, still getting nowhere outside Rawanduz, ended Operation Dawn 9.

== See also ==
- Operation Dawn 10
