= Duhok District =

Duhok District Sorani Kurdish: قەزای دهۆک, romanized: Qezaya Dihokê قضاء دهوك
- District
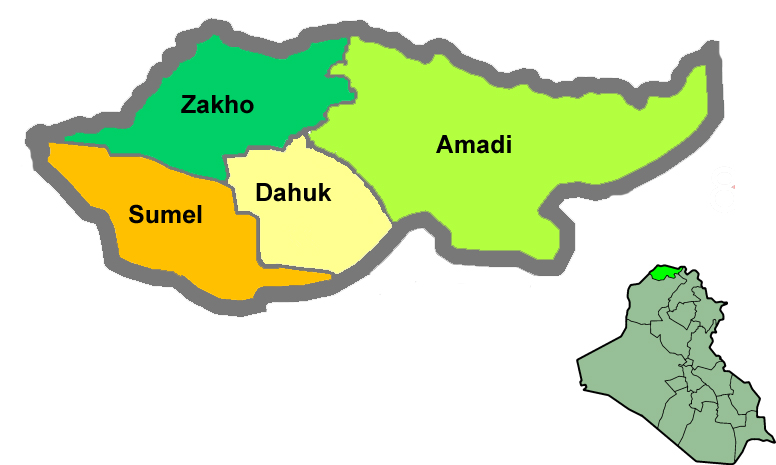

- Location within Iraq
- Country: Iraq
- Region: Kurdistan Region
- Governorate: Duhok Governorate
- Seat: Duhok

Population (2014)
  - Urban: 337,314
  - Rural: 16,023
- Time zone: UTC+3 (AST)
- Area code: +964 62

Duhok District (Arabic: قضاء دهوك, romanized: qaḍāʾ Dahūk; Sorani Kurdish: قەزای دهۆک, romanized: Qezaya Dihokê) is a district of Duhok Governorate in Kurdistan Region, Iraq. The administrative centre is Duhok.

== History ==
In 1929, the district had a diverse population of 29,858, including 18,307 Muslim Kurds, 5784 Christians, 2068 Muslim Arabs, 2870 Yazidis, and 829 Jews.

== Subdistricts ==
The district has the following sub-districts:

- Duhok
- Mangesh
- Zawita

== Bibliography ==
- Zaken, M. (2007). Jewish Subjects and Their Tribal Chieftains in Kurdistan. Brill.
