= Donny George Youkhanna =

Doctor Donny George ܕܘܢܝ ܓܘܪܓ ܝܘܚܢܢ
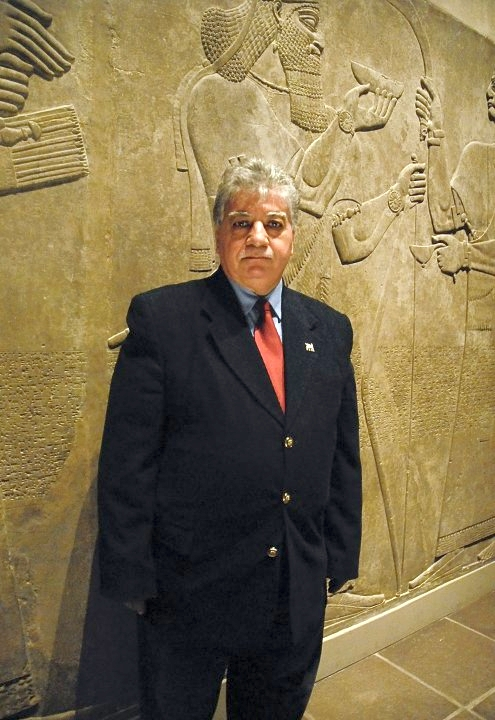
- Youkhanna in the Metropolitan Museum of Art
- Born: October 23, 1950; Habbaniyah, Iraq
- Died: March 11, 2011 (aged 60); Toronto, Ontario, Canada
- Education: University of Baghdad
- Occupations: Archaeologist, activist, author, professor, scholar
- Years active: 1976–2011
- Organization(s): Iraqi Department of Antiquities; Iraqi National Museum; Iraqi Academy of Sciences; University of Baghdad

Donny George Youkhanna (Arabic: دوني جورج, Syriac: ܕܘܢܝ ܓܘܪܓ ܝܘܚܢܢ) (October 23, 1950 – March 11, 2011) was an Iraqi-Assyrian archaeologist, anthropologist, author, curator, and scholar, and a visiting professor at Stony Brook University in New York.

== Biography ==
Youkhanna was born in Habbaniyah, Iraq in 1950 to Assyrian parents from northern Iraq. He moved with his family to Baghdad during his childhood, where he gained his education. He gained a BA, MA, and PhD in prehistoric archaeology at the University of Baghdad. He was fluent in Aramaic, Arabic, and English.

Youkhanna was the Director General of Iraq's National Museum, Chairman of the State Board of Antiquities and Heritage and the President of the Iraq State Board of Antiquities and Heritage. He conducted excavations in the Bekhme Dam area, Nineveh, and Tell Umm al-Aqarib as well as working on many restoration projects in Babylon, Nimrud, Nineveh, Ur and Baghdad. He authored two books on the structural design and stone industries of Tell es Sawwan, and gave several presentations on the current museum conditions and historical archaeological sites of Iraq.

Dr. George, who dropped his last name for professional purposes, was instrumental in recovering over half of the 15,000 Mesopotamian artifacts looted from the National Museum in Baghdad during the invasion. A majority of the artefacts date back to 6,000 years from the ancient empires of Assyria and Babylonia. He fought his way through to the Iraq National Museum in the days after the American-led invasion of Iraq and tried to stop the looters ransacking it but was unable to persuade American soldiers to protect it because they had been given no orders to do so.

He became the international face of the plight of ancient sites and artefacts in Iraq, many of which were stolen or destroyed during the invasion. In December 2008, Youkhanna was decisive in preventing the sale of royal Neo-Assyrian earrings from the world-famous Nimrud treasures at Christie's art auction in New York.

Due to threats from unknown militia groups during the US occupation of Iraq, Youkhanna was forced to flee Iraq with his family first to Syria and then to the United States in 2006, to take up a position as visiting professor at Stony Brook University in New York.

He died on 11 March 2011 as a result of a heart attack while he was travelling via Toronto Pearson International Airport, Toronto, Ontario, Canada. He was 60.

=== Education ===
- Bachelor of Arts in archaeology, University of Baghdad, 1974
- Master of Arts in Prehistoric Archaeology, University of Baghdad, 1986
- Ph.D. in Prehistoric Archaeology, University of Baghdad, 1995

=== Career ===
- Member Staff in the Iraqi National Museum, 1976
- Director of Documentation Center, 1980
- Field Director for the Restoration Project in Babylon, 1986–87
- Archaeological Investigation in the Eastern Wall of Nineveh, 1988
- Scientific Super Advisor for Bakhma Dam Archaeological Rescue Project, 1989
- Director of Relations, 1990
- Director of Documentation Center, 1992
- Assistant Director General of Antiquities for Technical Affairs, 1995
- Professor in the Department of Archaeology at the University of Baghdad
- Professor in the Department of Archaeology at the Babylon College for Theology and Philosophy
- Director of Excavation Team in the site of Umm al-Aqarib, 1999–2000
- Head of the Technical Committee, 1999–2000
- Member of the Jerusalem Army, 2000–03
- Director General of Research and Studies, 2000–03
- Director General of the Iraqi Museums, 2003-05
- Member of the International Regional Committee of Interpol, 2003
- Member of the Iraqi National Committee for Education, Science, and Culture, Iraqi UNESCO, 2004
- Chairman of the Iraqi State Board of Antiquities and Heritage, 2005-06
- Member of the Iraqi Science Academy, Department of the Syriac Language, 2005
- Board of Advisors, Assyrian Academic Society

== Works ==
=== Authored ===
- Co-Author of Photography: The Graves of the Assyrian Queens in Nimrud, 2000
- Co-Author of Pots and Pans
- Co-Author of The Looting of the Iraq Museum, 2005
- Co-Author of The Destruction of the Cultural Heritage in Iraq, 2008
- Co-Author of Antiquities under Siege, Cultural Heritage in Iraq, 2008
- Co-Author of Catastrophe, The Looting and Destructions of Iraq's Past, 2008
- Author of Architecture of the Sixth Millennium B.C. in Tell Es-Sawwan
- Author of The Stone Industries in Tell Es-Sawwan, 'Book in Process'

=== Publications ===
- Stores in Ancient Mesopotamia, 1985.
- A New Acheulian hand Axe from the Iraqi Western Desert in the Iraq Museum, 1993
- Proverbs in Ancient Mesopotamia, 1994
- The Architecture of the Sixth Millennium BC in Tell Esswwan, 1997
- Precision Craftsmanship of the Nimrud Gold Material, 2002
- Full Account on the Iraqi Museums and Archaeological sites, 2004

=== Conferences ===
- Recontre Assyriologic, Heidelberg, Germany, 1992
- Recontre Assyriologic, London, UK, 2004
- International Conference on the Excavations at the Ancient city of Nimrud, London, 2004
- International Conference for the Protection of the Iraqi Antiquities, Istanbul, Turkey, 2004
- Interpol International Regional Conference for the Protection of the Iraq Antiquities, Amman, Jordan. 2004
- International Council of Museums ICOM Conference, Seoul, South Korea, 2004
- Archaeological Institute of America, Boston, USA, 2004
- International Conference for the Protection of Iraqi Antiquities, Washington DC, USA, 2005
- Iraq Cultural Committee at UNESCO, Paris, France
- U.S. Institute of Peace, Washington DC, 2008

=== Lectures ===
- Belgium: Brussels National Museum
- Britain: University of London, the British Museum
- Denmark: National Museum in Copenhagen
- Germany: University of Berlin, Pergamum Museum, Heidelberg University, Goethe University Frankfurt, LMU Munich, Römisch-Germanisches Zentralmuseum Mainz
- Jordan: Department of Antiquities, German Archaeological Institute in Amman
- Italy: Sapienza University of Rome
- Japan: University of Kukushikan, Japanese Society for the Antiquities of the Middle East
- Spain: University Autónoma de Madrid
- Sweden: University of Gothenburg, Museum of World Culture, Museum of Mediterranean and the Middle East
- USA: University of Chicago, Harvard University, State University of New York at Stony Brook, Museums of Fine Art in Boston, Pennsylvania Museum, Iraqi Embassy in Washington DC, Yeshiva University, State University of Arizona, South Methodist University in Dallas, Texas, Bowers Museum of Art in Santa Ana, Denver Museum of Science and Nature, South Methodist University in Taos, New Mexico and Crow Canyon Archaeological Center in Cortez, Colorado, CSU Stanislaus, Turlock, Gustavus Adolphus College
