= Mangesh, Iraq =

Mangesh
- Village
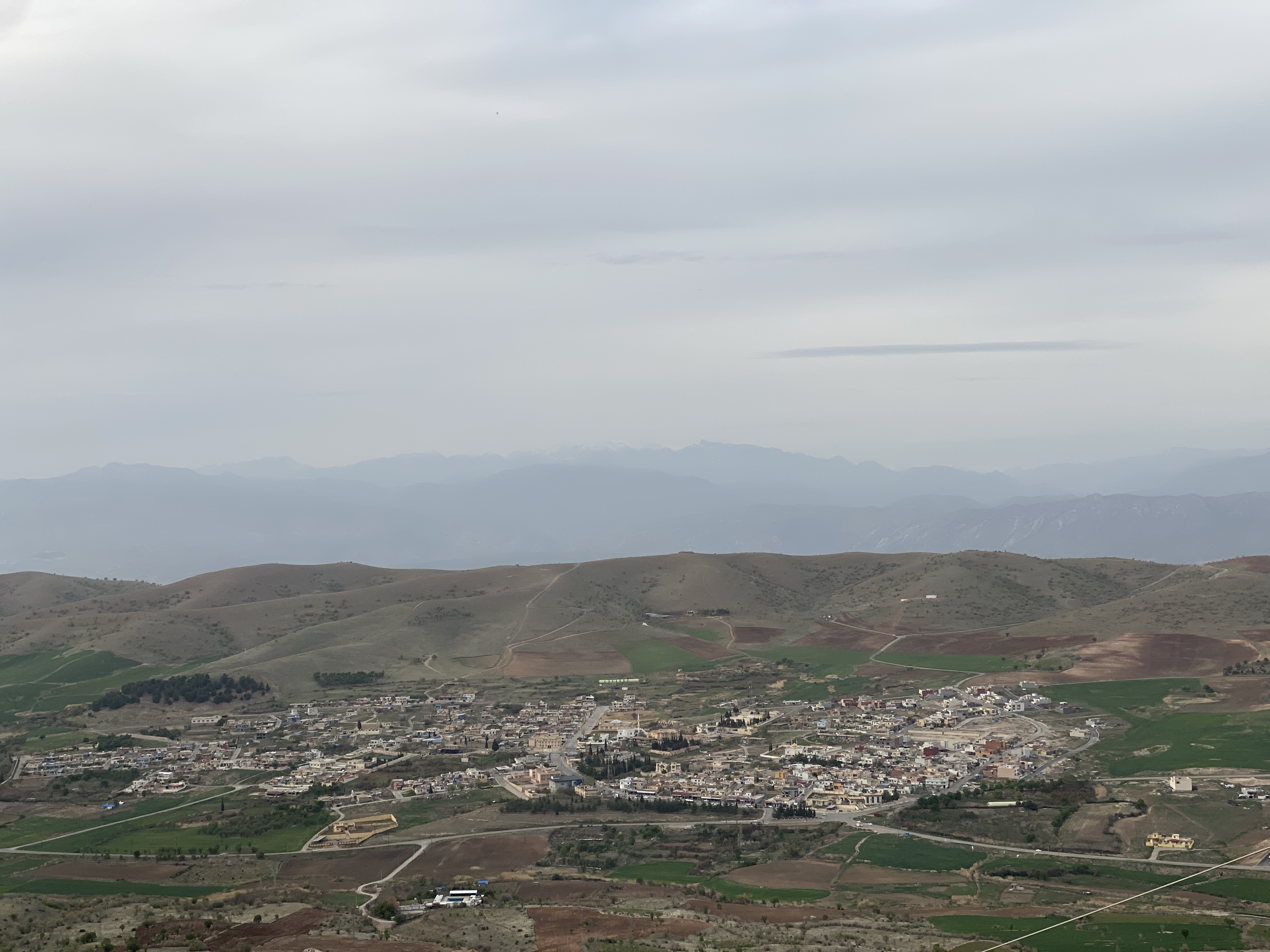

- Location in Iraq Mangesh (Iraqi Kurdistan)
- Coordinates: 37°02′08.0″N 43°05′35.5″E
- Country: Iraq
- Region: Kurdistan Region
- Governorate: Dohuk Governorate
- District: Dohuk District
- Sub-district: Mangesh

Population (2012)
  - Total: 1,285

Mangesh (Arabic: مانكيش, Kurdish: مانگێش, Syriac: ܡܢܓܝܫ) (Note: Alternatively transliterated as Mangeshe, Manghesh, Mankish, Mangish, or Mengesh.) is a village and sub-district in Dohuk Governorate in Kurdistan Region, Iraq. It is located in the Dohuk District.

In the village, there is a church of Mar Gewargis and shrine of Mart Shmuni.

== History ==
A community of adherents of the Church of the East is attested in the 10th-century Life of Rabban Joseph Busnaya. The Monastery of Mar Abraham of Shamrah was located near the village, and was abandoned in the 14th century. The village was plundered by Kurds in 1712. A significant proportion of the population of Mangesh was converted to Chaldean Catholicism by Mattai Shemʿon, Chaldean Catholic Archbishop of Amadiya, in 1791, and 13 villagers subsequently entered the Rabban Hormizd Monastery between 1808 and 1827. However, a community loyal to the Church of the East may have persisted into the early 19th century. In 1850, 150 Chaldean Catholic families inhabited Mangesh, and were served by three priests and one functioning church as part of the diocese of Amadiya. The number of Chaldean Catholics in the village had grown to 1100 by 1913, with four priests and one church. There were 230 households in 1920. Mangesh was inhabited by 1195 people in 1947.

At the onset of the First Iraqi–Kurdish War in 1961, there were 600 families, but attacks by Barzani Kurds forced many to flee, and the population decreased to 959 people by 1965. The village recovered, and around the time of the war's end in 1970, 1390 people inhabited Mangesh. Amidst the Iran–Iraq War, the village was seized by Iranian paratroopers and 1000 Peshmerga soldiers on 15 May 1986 as part of Operation Dawn 9 in an effort to threaten the Kirkuk–Dörtyol oil pipeline. Iranian control of Mangesh was short-lived as an Iraqi force consisting of an armoured brigade, a mountain brigade, and a special forces brigade with attack helicopters and pro-Iraqi Kurdish partisans retook the village soon afterwards.

In 1989, Kurdish families were forcibly resettled in Mangesh by the Iraqi government, until which point the village was solely inhabited by Assyrians who spoke Chaldean Neo-Aramaic. As a consequence of the Iraqi Al-Anfal campaign in the late 1980s, agricultural lands in the sub-district were abandoned. On 13 December 1997, seven unarmed Assyrian civilians from Mangesh were ambushed by Kurdistan Workers' Party (PKK) militants, and six were killed in the attack. On 21 December, the National Liberation Front of Kurdistan denied the PKK was responsible for the deaths, and instead claimed the Kurdistan Democratic Party (KDP) had orchestrated the attack; the sole survivor of the attack died of her wounds on 26 December. In the period from 1950 to 1997, over forty people from the village were assassinated.

Agricultural lands in the sub-district abandoned during the Al-Anfal campaign were re-cultivated between 1998 and 2002. The Supreme Committee of Christian Affairs constructed 180 houses, restored the church, and provided infrastructure for the village in the 2000s. The Assyrian General Conference reported its representatives were threatened by armed KDP members at Mangesh in December 2005. The village was inhabited by 1285 Chaldean Catholics in 2012. In September 2013, Assyrians of Mangesh reported that they suffered from persecution and intimidation from the Kurdistan Regional Government, and were coerced into supporting the KDP. Mangesh became a place of refuge for 77 Syriac Orthodox families from the vicinity of Alqosh who had fled the Islamic State of Iraq and the Levant offensive on 6 August 2014. Prior to the arrival of the refugees, the village was inhabited by roughly 300 Assyrian families. By September, Assyrian refugees from Bakhdida and Yazidis had also fled to Mangesh, and the school was converted into a temporary shelter.

== Bibliography ==
- Donabed, Sargon George (2015). Reforging a Forgotten History: Iraq and the Assyrians in the Twentieth Century. Edinburgh University Press.
- Eklund, Lina; Lange, Katharina (2018). "Crisis and Agricultural Change in the Kurdistan Region of Iraq, 1980s-2010s: an Interdisciplinary Approach". In Rami Zurayk; Eckart Woertz; Rachel Bahn (eds.). Crisis and Conflict in Agriculture. CABI. pp. 118–131.
- Hanna, Reine; Barber, Matthew (2017). Erasing Assyrians: How the KRG Abuses Human Rights, Undermines Democracy, and Conquers Minority Homelands (PDF). Assyrian Confederation of Europe.
- Razoux, Pierre (2015). The Iran-Iraq War. Harvard University Press.
- Sara, Solomon I. (1974). A Description of Modern Chaldean. Mouton & Co. N.V., Publishers.
- Wilmshurst, David (2000). The Ecclesiastical Organisation of the Church of the East, 1318–1913 (PDF). Peeters Publishers.
