= Zawita =

Zawita زاويتة
- Town
- Etymology: The name of the town is thought to come from the Syriac word for "corner."
- Interactive map of Zawita
- Coordinates: 36°54′21″N 43°08′34″E
- Country: Iraq
- Region: Kurdistan Region
- Governorate: Dohuk Governorate
- District: Dohuk District
- Time zone: UTC+3 (AST)

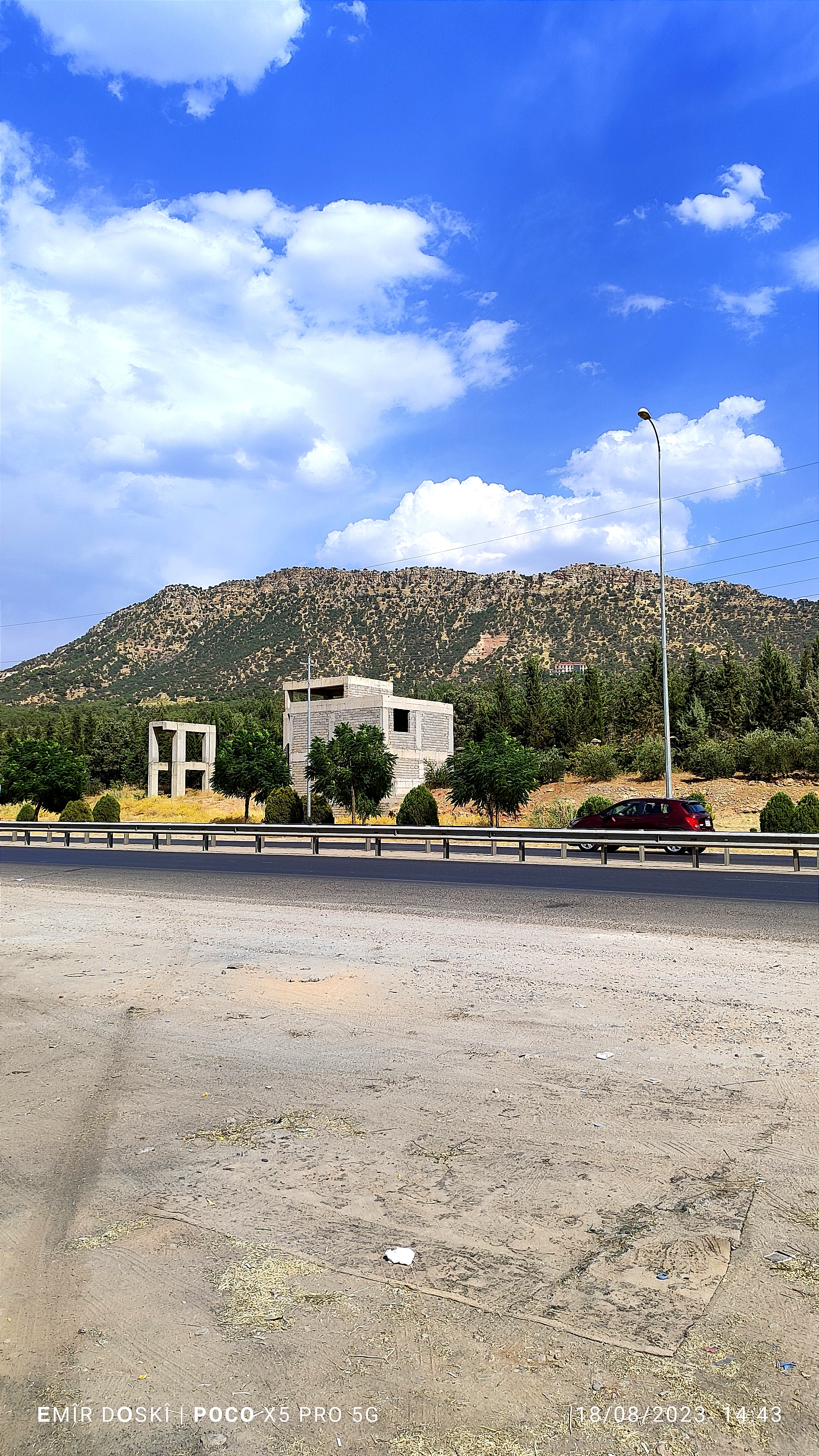
Zawita, Duhok, Iraq

Zawita (Arabic: زاويتة, Kurdish: زاویته, romanized: Zawîte) is a town in the Dohuk Governorate, Kurdistan Region in Iraq. The name of the town is thought to come from the Syriac word for "corner."
