= Assyrian Studies Association =

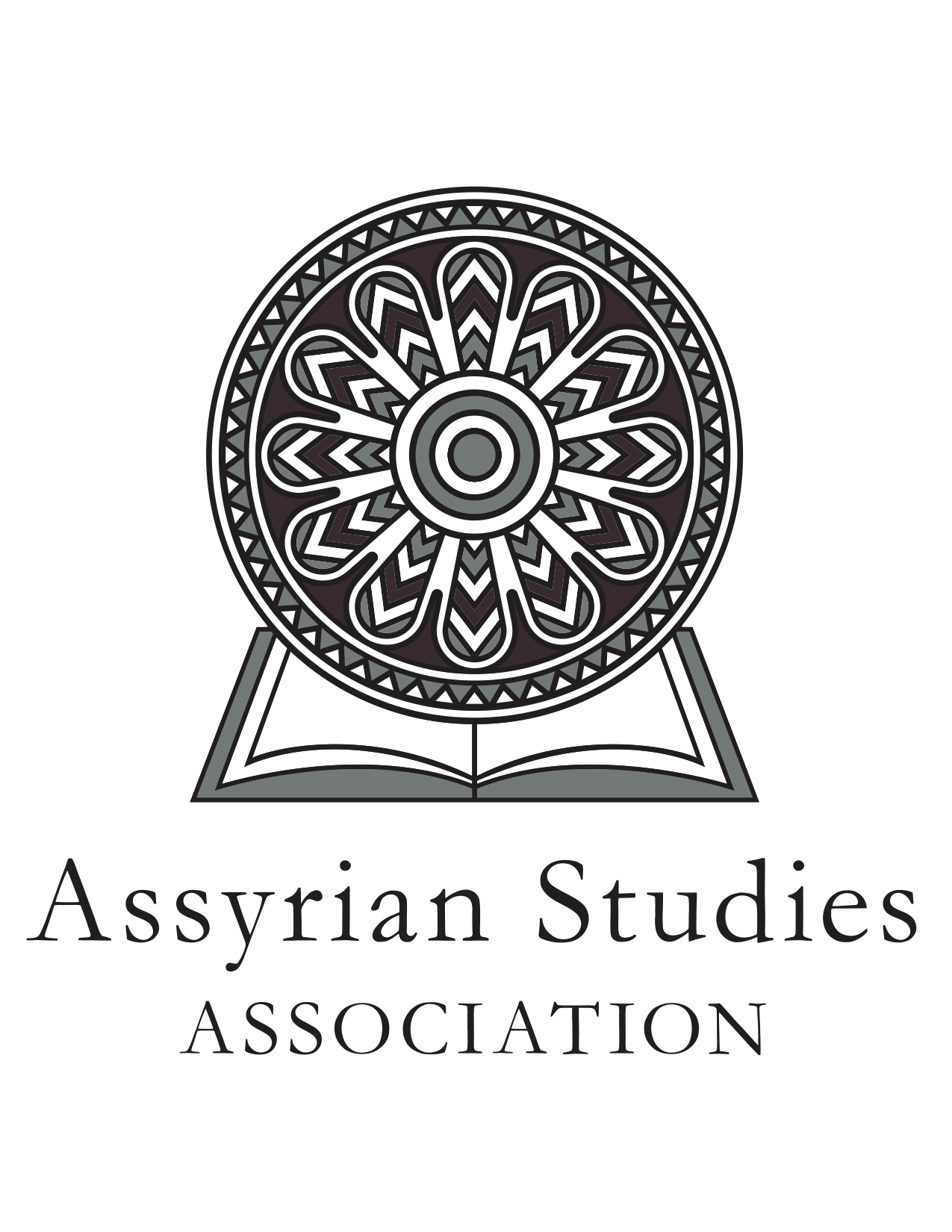
- Abbreviation: ASA
- Formation: 2019
- Founded at: Chicago
- Type: Non-governmental organization, 501(c)(3)
- Headquarters: Woodland Hills, California
- Official language: English and Assyrian Neo-Aramaic
- Affiliations: MESA
- Website: assyrianstudiesassociation.org

The Assyrian Studies Association (ASA), formerly the Assyrian Academic Society, is an academic, educational and minority organization of Assyrians in the United States. The modern organization of ASA was founded in 2019 to continue the AAS' original roles.

From its original foundation, AAS was based in Chicago, a city with one of the largest communities of Assyrian Americans, and was established as a non-governmental organization dedicated to promotion and preservation of Assyrian cultural and historical heritage. Its activities included organization of lectures and seminars, promotion of Assyrian literature and native language, and cooperation with other Assyrian organizations, both in the United States and worldwide. The organization was a registered 501(C)(3) non-profit organization, without political affiliations.

ASA's mission is to promote the academic study of the Assyrian heritage through supporting research, teaching, and intellectual collaboration among scholars in fields that include history, archaeology, cultural heritage, religion, language, literary studies, social sciences, arts and architecture, law among others.

== Early history ==
The Assyrian Academic Society was founded in 1983 in Chicago, Illinois, which has one of the largest concentrations of the Assyrian diaspora in the United States.

From 1986, AAS was associated with the publishing of the Journal of the Assyrian Academic Society. However, in 1997, several disputes arose, resulting in the creation of two editorial boards. The one under the jurisdiction of AAS continued to publish the journal under its original name until 2000, and was published semiannually from Des Plaines, Illinois. The other initiated publishing of separate editions under a new name: Journal of Assyrian Academic Studies, with the latest issue of the journal appearing in 2015.

In 1996, the "Assyrian Dictionary Project" was initiated by AAS, aimed to create new editions of English-Assyrian (Neo-Aramaic) and Assyrian-English dictionaries, also engaging in other linguistic projects, aimed to popularize native languages.

During its run, the AAS also participated in a number of political initiatives to represent the Assyrians domestically and in the Assyrian homeland. In 1999, the organization joined a series of discussions, initiated by the United States Census Bureau in relation to complex questions of ethnic designations, that would be used in the forthcoming 2000 United States census. As a result of those discussions, AAS supported a compromise solution, proposed by the Census Bureau, that was based on the use of a compound "Assyrian/Chaldean/Syriac" designation for all communities that self-identify with those appellations. After the US invasion of Iraq in 2003, AAS joined the efforts of the Assyrian diaspora to support Assyrians in Iraq and their endeavors to secure national, religious and other minority rights, and achieve constitutional recognition in post-Saddam Iraq. AAS continued these initiatives with a new project, known as the "Iraq Sustainable Democracy Project", headed by Michael Youash and receiving support from several USA institutions and politicians, including Congressman Mark Kirk.

Within the field of Middle Eastern studies, AAS cooperated with the Middle East Studies Association of North America (MESA), participating in activities and programs that received acknowledgment by scholars working in the field.

== Modern activities ==
Since 2014, collective efforts in the fields of organization and promotion of academic and educational activities among Assyrian Americans were regrouped and restructured, and in 2019, the ASA was established. The group continued traditional cooperation with the Middle Eastern Studies Association (MESA) through the form of an official partner organization, previously established and conducted by AAS over the course of two decades.

The Board of Directors of ASA include many prominent academics who have written on Assyrian issues and history, including Sargon Donabed, Önver Cetrez, and Nahrain Bet Younadam. The Executive Director since 2019 is Alexandra Lazar.

=== Preserving Assyria ===
One of the main tasks of the Assyrian Studies Association is the Preserving Assyria Program, which is divided into four distinct initiatives: Heritage Archive, Oral History, Giving Back, and Educational Initiative.

The Heritage Archive is a collection of historical Assyrian materials such as books, photographs, and poems to display for exhibitions. Several examples of the successful work of the archive have been presented in prior exhibits, such as at the California State University, Stanislaus in 2022.

Giving Back is an initiative to provide grants to upcoming scholars of Assyrian history to pursue their work. Different grants are given to scholars for pursuing Academic and Culture research, as well as those who are working to publish a children's or popular book on Assyrian culture or history.

=== Assyrians in Motion ===
Oral History revolves around Assyrians in Motion, a biographic film divided into two reels that chronicle the experience of the Assyrian American diaspora in the early 20th century. The first reel covers the Chicago area, while the second shows footage from the East Coast of the United States. The film serves as an exhibit with the intention of allowing Assyrians to not only experience the film, but add any contributions they see fit.

The film was conceived by John (Aghajan) Baba, who had immigrated from Sir, West Azerbaijan and established a publication, Kitavona. In an effort to raise money for the publication, Baba had traveled across the United States, photographing and filming Assyrian picnics, businesses, family gatherings, funerals, and other events that were compiled into a film. As the film was rediscovered in 2000, Dr. Joel Elias of the Assyrian Foundation of America made VHS copies of the film to show to his family. The film was then digitized in 2017 by the Elias family, and donated to the Library of Congress with the help of the AFA. Through the work of Assyrian Studies Association, the film is now available for public viewing on their website, and have continued to incorporate extra research into studying the early Assyrian American community.

=== Events ===
ASA hosts many educational events, book talks, and webinars with Assyrian academics that focus on discussing and preserving Assyrian history and heritage. Additionally, the ASA also hosted a symposium in 2023, discussing the challenges of studying and preserving Assyrian history and identity, while simultaneously searching for new avenues of scholarship.

== See also ==
- Assyrian Americans
- Chicago, Illinois
- Assyrian Policy Institute
- Donny George Youkhanna

== Sources ==
- Boháč, Artur (2019). "Middle Eastern Christians in Diaspora and their Political Activism towards Their Countries of Origin". Political Sciences. 22 (4): 57–80. doi:10.24040/politickevedy.2019.22.4.57-80.
- Donabed, Sargon G.; Donabed, Ninos (2006). Assyrians of Eastern Massachusetts. Charleston: Arcadia Publishing. ISBN 9780738544809.
- Donabed, Sargon G. (2015). Reforging a Forgotten History: Iraq and the Assyrians in the Twentieth Century. Edinburgh: Edinburgh University Press. ISBN 9780748686056.
- Joseph, Nadia E. (1998). "The Journal of the Assyrian Academic Society - Revisited". Zenda Magazine. 4 (1).
- Odisho, Edward Y. (1988). "Why the Assyrian Academic Society?" (PDF). Journal of the Assyrian Academic Society. 2: 2–7. Archived from the original (PDF) on 2005-02-17.
- Travis, Hannibal (2010). Genocide in the Middle East: The Ottoman Empire, Iraq, and Sudan (PDF). Durham, NC: Carolina Academic Press.
